= Amber, India =

Amber Amer
- city
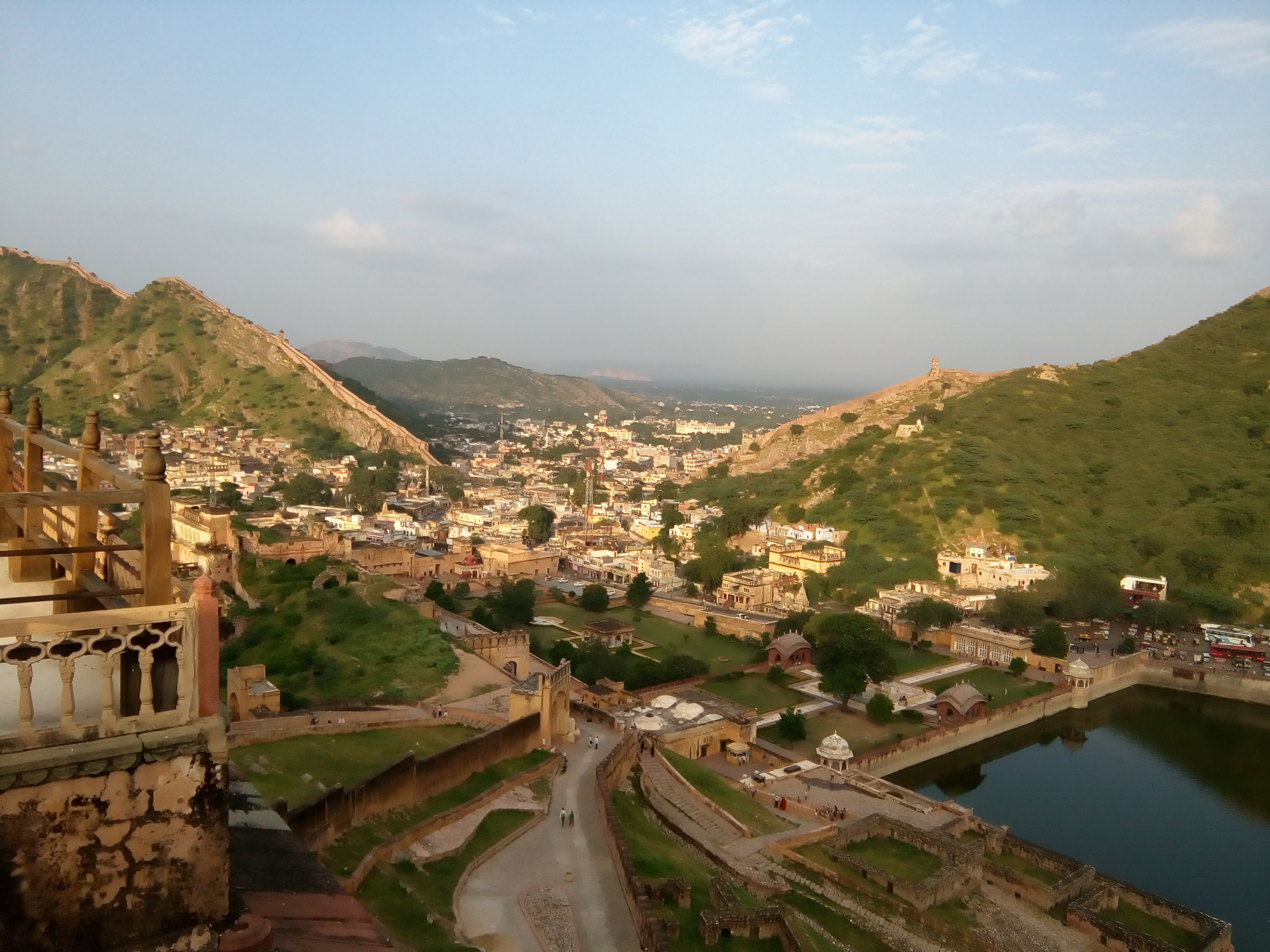
- Aerial view of Amber

- Location within Rajasthan Amber (Rajasthan) Amber (India)
- Coordinates: 26°59′N 75°52′E
- Country: India
- State: Rajasthan
- District(s): Jaipur
- Time zone: UTC+05:30 (IST)

Amer, historically anglicized to Amber, is a town near the city of Jaipur in Jaipur district in the Indian state of Rajasthan. It is now a part of the Jaipur Municipal Corporation.

Situated at the mouth of a rocky mountain gorge, the historical town of Amber has long attracted the admiration of travelers, including Victor Jacquemont and Reginald Heber. It is seen as a remarkable example of both Rajput and Mughal architecture. The Amber Fort, a UNESCO World Heritage Site, sits atop the town as its main tourist attraction.

== History ==
Amer, originally named Ambikeshwar, was a local Meena settlement before it was conquered by Raja Kakil Dev, son of Raja Dulha Rai of Dhundhar, in 1037 CE. The town replaced Khoh as the capital of Dhundhar around 1207 CE. Amer would remain the seat of the Kachwaha Rajput dynasty for the next 500 years.

The state of Amber or Dhundhar and was controlled by Meena chiefs of five different tribes who were under suzerainty of the Bargurjar Rajput Raja of Deoti. Later a Kachhwaha prince Dulha Rai destroyed the sovereignty of Meenas and also defeated Bargurjars of Deoli and took Dhundhar fully under Kachwaha rule.

Much of the present structure known as Amber Fort is actually the palace built by Raja Man Singh I of Amer who ruled from 1590 to 1614 AD. The palace includes several spectacular buildings, such as the Diwan-i-Khas, and the elaborately painted Ganesh Pole built by the renowned warlord Mirza Raja Jai Singh I (Man Singh I's grandson). The old and original fort of Amber, dating from earlier Rajas or the Mair or Maidh period, is what is known in the present day as Jaigarh Fort, which was actually the main defensive structure rather than the palace itself. The two structures are interconnected by a series of encompassing fortifications.

Amber was capital of the Kachwaha until 1727 when the ruler of Amber, Sawai Jai Singh II founded a capital Jainagara (Jaipur), named after him, about nine kilometers south of Amber. After the founding of this new town, the royal palace and houses of prominent persons were shifted to Jaipur. The priests of Shila Devi temple, who were Bengali Brahmins, continued to live in the fort (to this date), while the Jaigarh fort above the palace also remained heavily garrisoned. The capital of Kachwaha was supplanted by the modern city of Jaipur, which is the capital of the Rajasthan state in India.

=== Controversy over renovation practices ===
Poor site management and development pressures have dramatically altered the historical integrity of Amber. The building that rings around the Jaleb Chwok courtyard "has been converted to a market place with shops selling showpieces and dresses. They have cafeterias, cyber cafés, etc.", according to the Times of India. In the summer of 2009, the Rajasthan High Court launched a three-member panel charged with investigating the controversial renovations and determining to what extent the cultural heritage of the site was compromised.

== Visitor attractions ==
- Amber Fort
- Maota Lake
- Jagat shiromani Temple
- Jaigarh Fort
- Nahargarh Biological Park
- Panna Meena ka Kund stepwell
- Water Gateways

=== Nahargarh Biological Park ===
This park is home to species whose numbers have declined over the years, such as the Indian leopard. The flora is representative of the Khathiar-Gir dry deciduous forests ecoregion.

== In media ==
Various scenes were produced for the 2011 British film The Best Exotic Marigold Hotel in and around Amber.

== Gallery ==
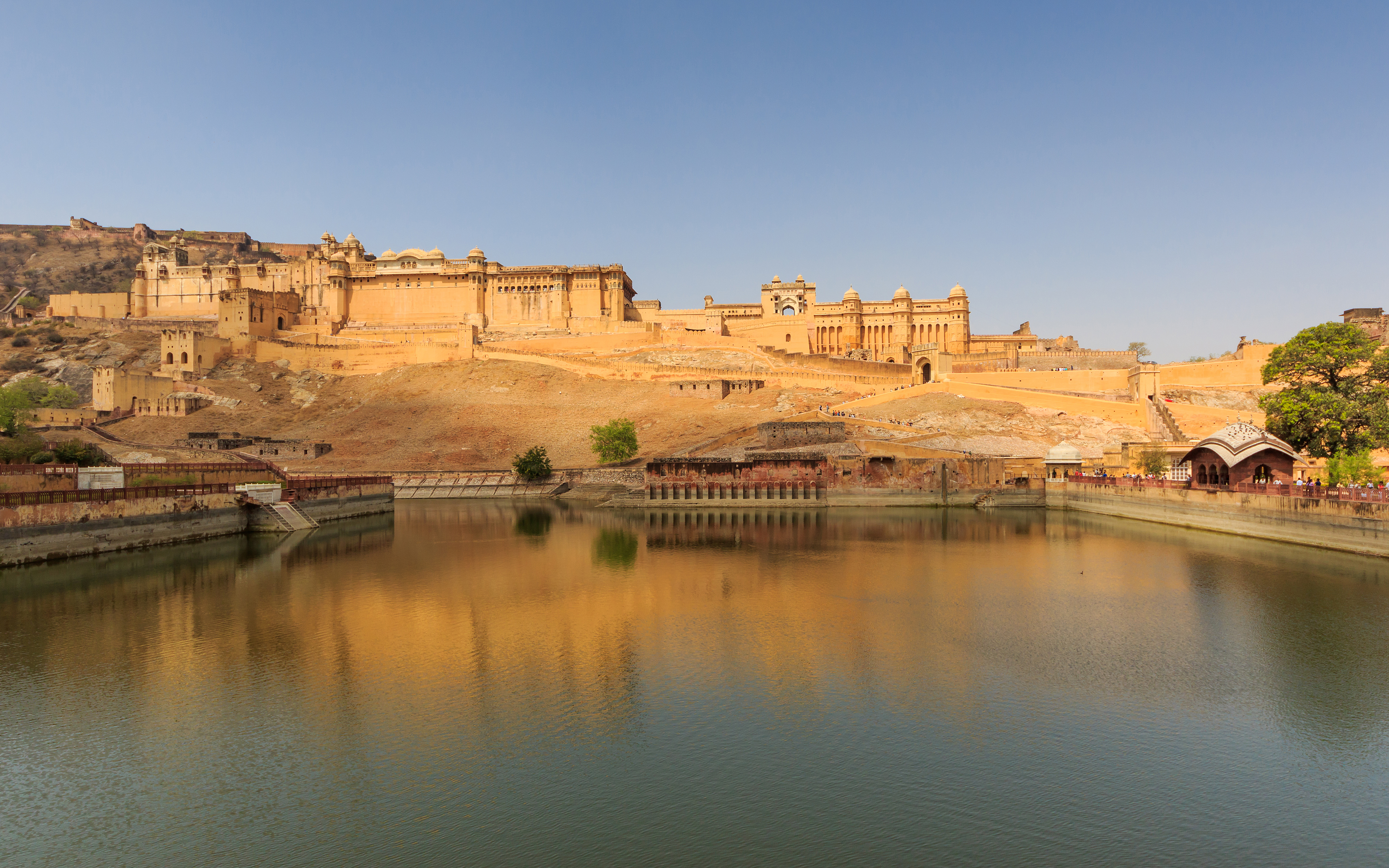
Amber Fort

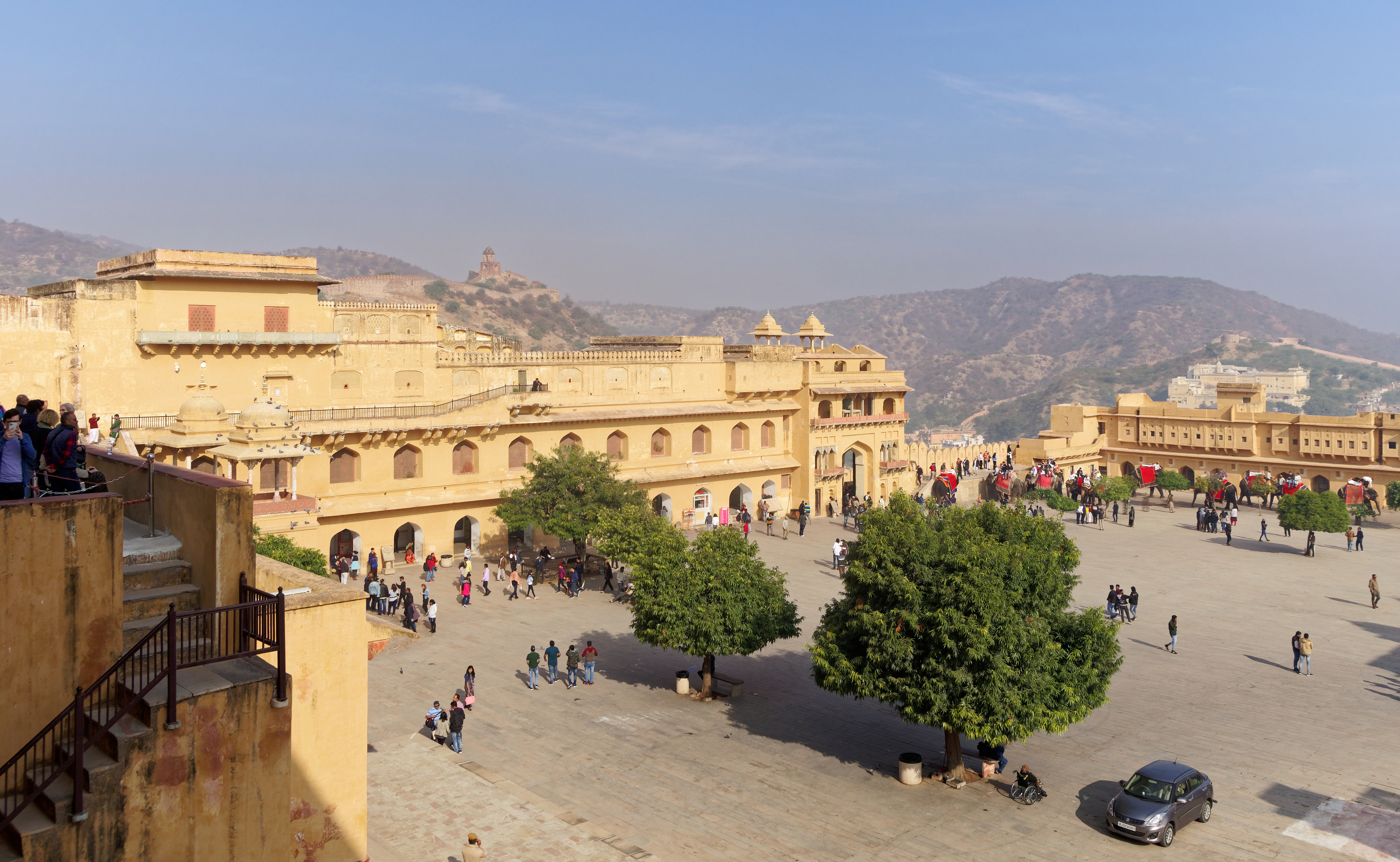
Amber Fort

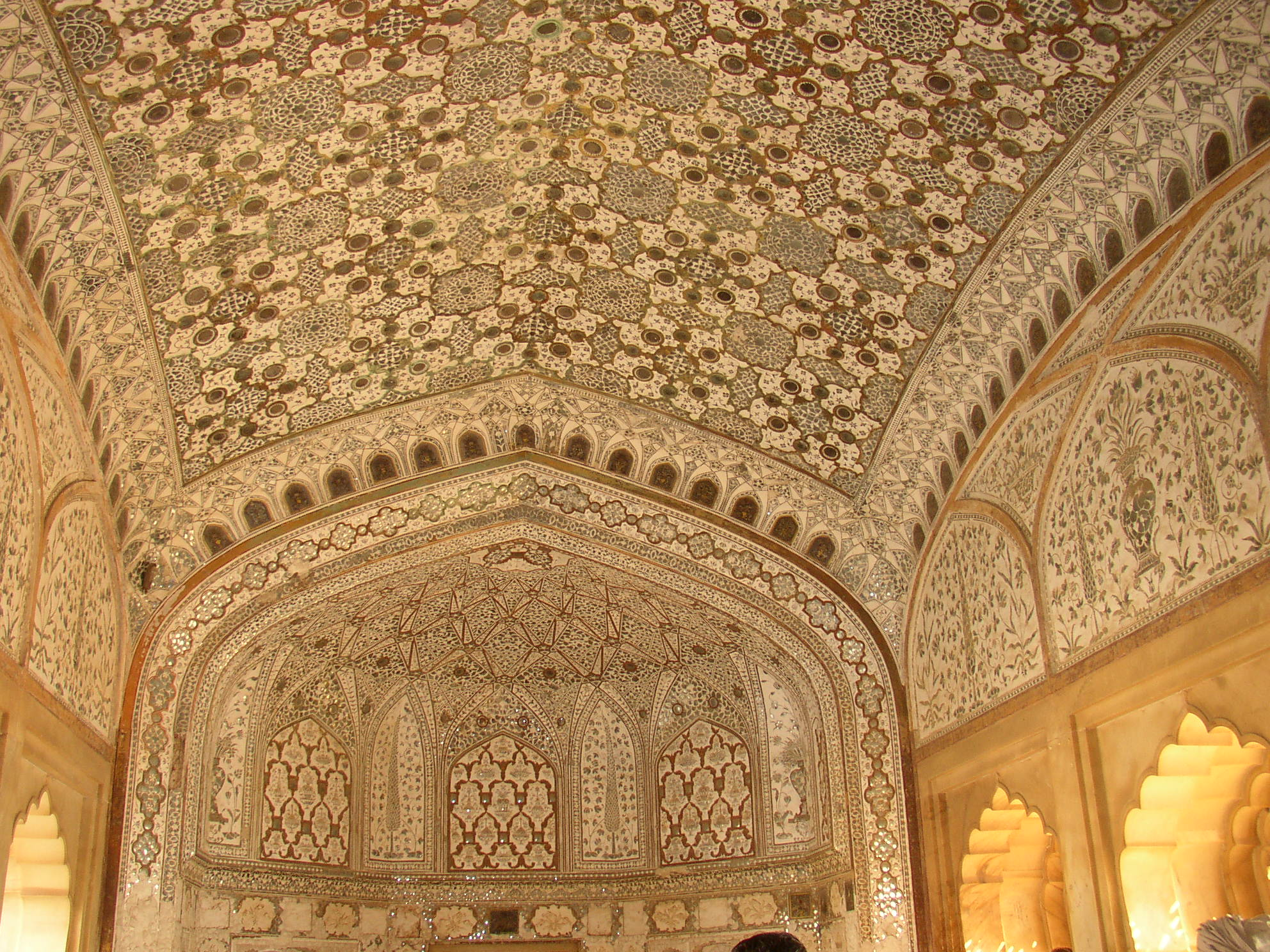
Interior of one of the palaces in Amber Fort

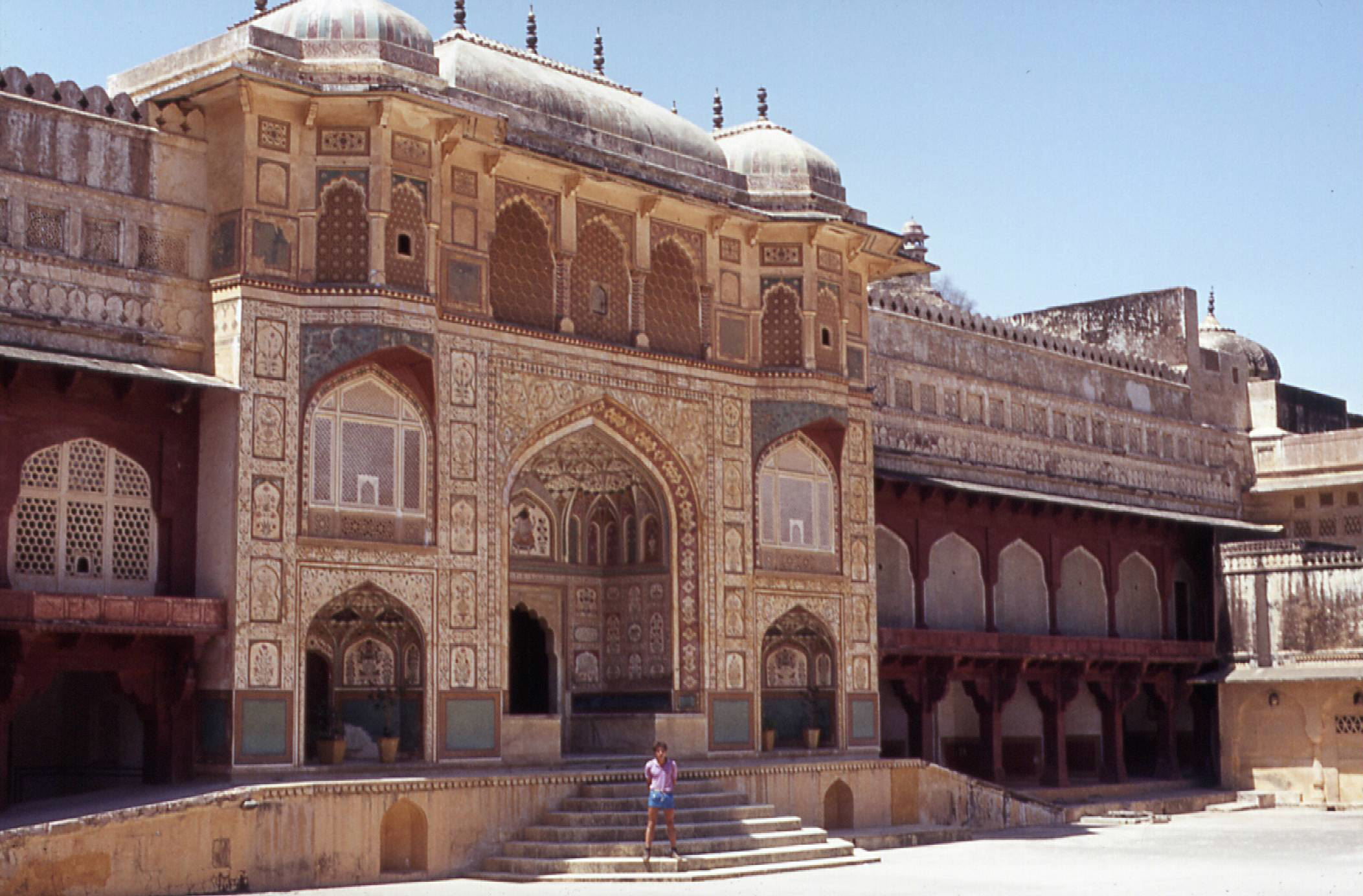
The fort in 1985

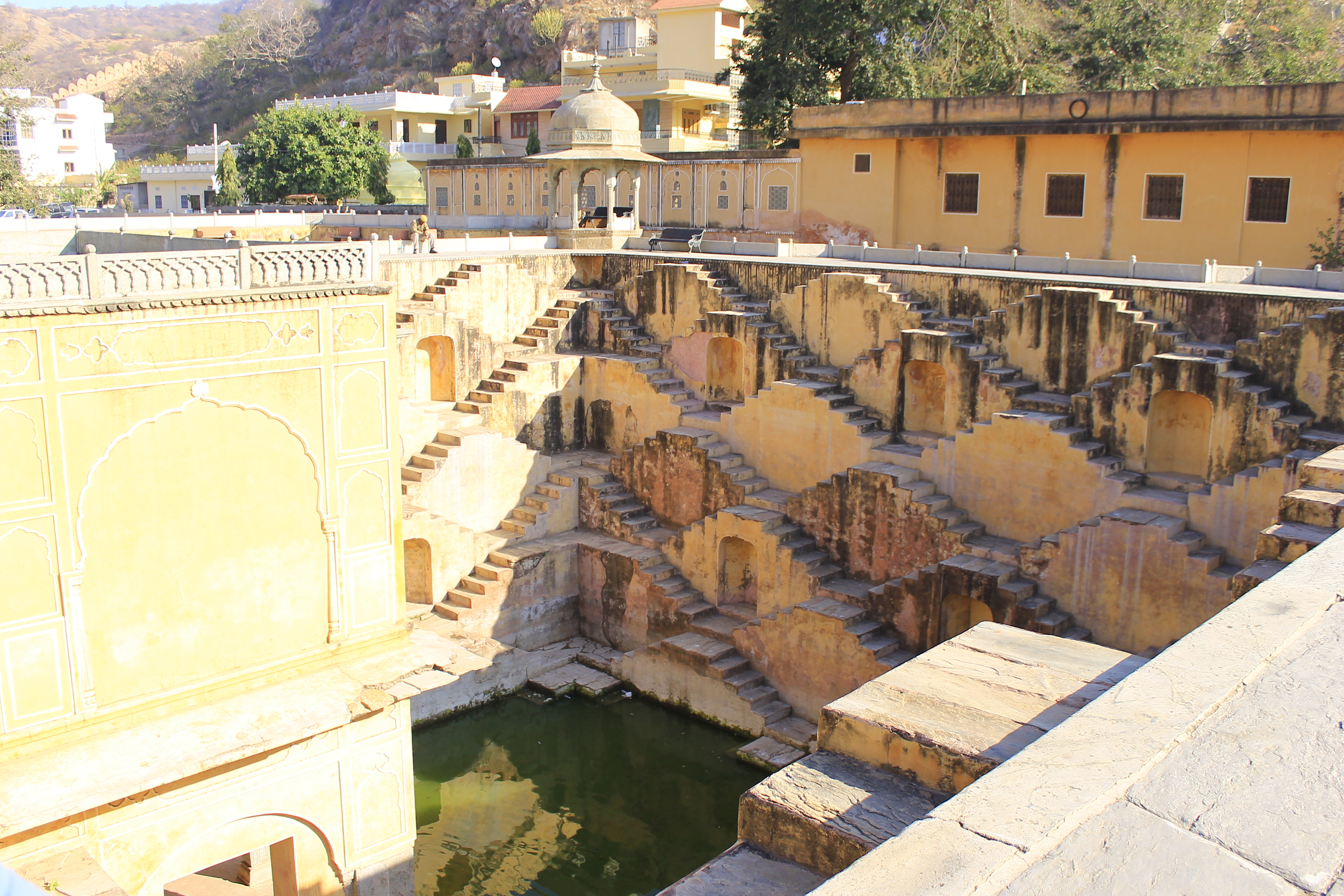
Panna Meena ka Kund stepwell

== See also ==
- Nahargarh Fort
- Rajasthani people
- Rajasthan
- Ramgarh Dam
