= Chilla =

Chilla or Chilla-nashini is a Sufi practice of penance and solitude.

Chilla may also refer to:

== Music ==
- Chilla katna, in Hindustani classical music, a stage of training
- Chillaa, a 2012 album by Robin
- Chilla (French rapper), a French-Malagasy singer-songwriter

== Places ==
- Chilla (Rajaji National Park), a wilderness area in India
- Chilla, Punjab, a village in India
- Chilla Canton, Ecuador
- Chilla, Devon, England

== People ==
- Chilla Bulbeck (born 1951), Australian academic
- Chilla Christ (1911–1998), Australian cricketer
- Chilla Jones (born 1987), American battle rapper
- Chilla Porter (1936–2020), Australian athlete and politician
- Chilla Wilson (1931–2016), Australian rugby union footballer
- Mercedes Chilla (born 1980), Spanish javelin thrower

== Other uses ==
- Chilla (month), the fifth month of the Nepal Era calendar
- South American gray fox or chilla

== See also ==
- Chila (disambiguation)
