= Sheela (disambiguation) =

Sheela is an Indian actress.

Sheela may also refer to:

- Sheela (given name), an Indian feminine given name
- M. S. Sheela, Indian vocalist
- Ma Anand Sheela (born 1949), Indian–American–Swiss criminal who pleaded guilty to attempted murder and assault
- Sheela (1935 film), an Indian Punjabi-language film
- Sheela (1987 film), an Indian Hindi-language fantasy adventure film
- Sheela na gig, figurative carvings of naked women found throughout Europe

== See also ==
- Sheila (disambiguation), a female given name of Irish origin, unrelated to the Indian name
- Shiela, alternative spelling of Sheila
- Shela (disambiguation)
- Shila (disambiguation)
