= Shila =

Shila may refer to:

== People ==
- Shila (Nestorian patriarch), Patriarch of the Church of the East from 503 to 523
- Shila of Kefar Tamarta, a Jewish Talmudist, an amora of the 3rd century
- Shilabhattarika, a 9th-century Sanskrit poet from India

== Other uses ==
- Shila Devi, the famous idol of Durga, the form of mother goddess in Shaktism
- Shila (film), a 1982 Indian Malayalam film

== See also ==
- Sila (murti)
- Sheela (disambiguation)
- Śīla (Buddhist ethics)
- Chila (disambiguation)
