= Shyla =

Shyla is a feminine given name, comparable to the English and Irish Sheila. In Sanskrit, it means goddess Parvathi and in English it means white dove.

== People with the given name ==
- Shyla Angela Prasad (born 1995), model, actress and beauty pageant titleholder
- Shyla Heal (born 2001), Australian basketball player
- Shyla Stylez (1982–2017), Canadian pornographic actress

== People with the surname ==
- Yaraslav Shyla (born 1993), Belarusian tennis player

== See also ==
- Shayla (disambiguation)
