= Sheila (disambiguation) =

Sheila is a common given name for a female.

Sheila may also refer to:

- Sheila (clipper ship), an 1877 ship which transported indentured laborers
- Sheila (yacht), an Albert Strange canoe yawl built in 1905
- Empire Sheila, a ship in the service of the British Government
- Sheela (1935 film) or Sheila, an Indian Punjabi-language film
- Sheila (dog), a dog who received the Dickin Medal in 1945
- Sheila, New Brunswick

== People ==
- Sheila (model) (born 1973), Japanese model
- Sheila Majid, Malaysian singer
- Sheila (French singer), French singer (born Annie Chancel)

== Songs ==
- "Sheila" (Jamie T song), a 2006 alternative rock song
- "Sheila" (Tommy Roe song), a 1962 pop song
- "Sheila" (Frank Sinatra song), 1953

== See also ==
- Sheela (disambiguation)
- Shayla (disambiguation)
- Shelia
- The Sheilas
