= Shayla (disambiguation) =

Shayla is an Islamic headgear worn by women. It is also a feminine given name.

== People ==
- Shayla Beesley (born 1991), American actress
- Shayla LaVeaux (born 1969), American pornographic actress and exotic dancer
- Shayla Worley (born 1990), American artistic gymnast

== Media ==
- "Shayla" (song), song by band Blondie from their 1979 album Eat to the Beat

== See also ==
- Sheila (disambiguation)
- Sharla
- Shyla
