= Maota Lake =

- Mahavata
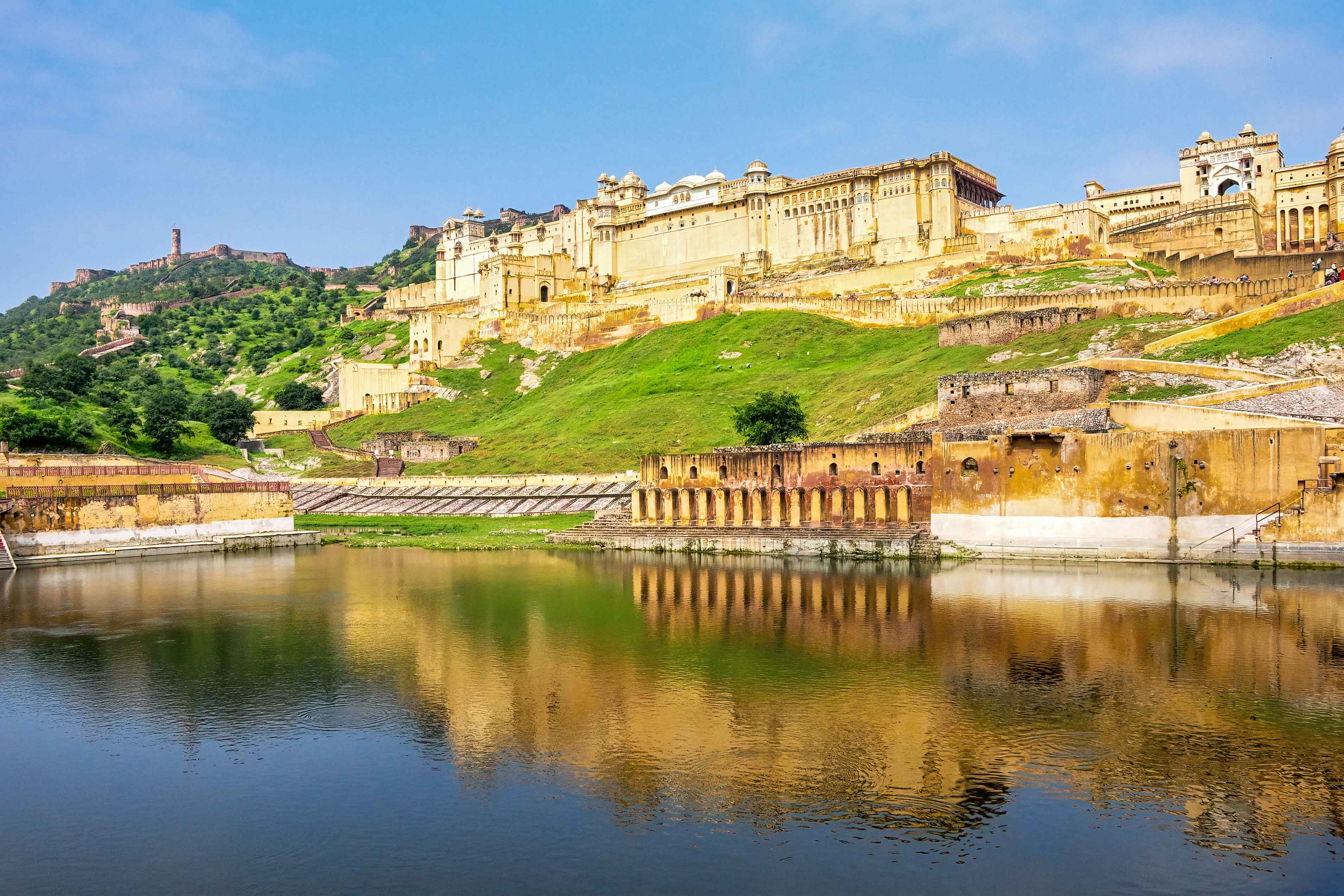
- Maota Lake seen near Amber Palace

- Location within Jaipur Location within Rajasthan Location within India
- Location: Amber, Rajasthan, India
- Coordinates: 26°59′00″N 75°51′09″E
- Type: lake
- Islands: Kesar Kyari Bagh

Maota Lake is located in Amber, in the Indian state of Rajasthan. The ancient name of the lake is "Mahavata", but it is commonly known as Maota due to the large trees located near the lake.

== Location and description ==
Maota Lake is located in the south of the city of Amber, about 11 kilometres (6.8 mi) from the center of Jaipur, at the base of Amber Fort. The lake contains an island in the center, named Kesar Kyari Bagh. The island has a saffron garden, whose plants are said to have been planted by a Maharaja in the 15th century. The Dil-Aaram Bagh is situated on the northern end of the lake. There is no fee to visit the lake, but there is a fee to traverse upward (or ride an elephant) to enter the Amber Fort above.

The lake collects rain water flowing down from the nearby hills and was the main source of water for the Amber Fort and common people. In Jaipur, after 7 or 10 days of Ganesh chaturthi, the statue is taken in a procession for immersion in the Maota Lake.
