= Chila =

Chila or Cheela may refer to:

== Places ==
- Chila, Angola
- Chila (municipality), Puebla, Mexico
- Chila de la Sal, Puebla, Mexico
- Chila mountain range, in the Arequipa Region in the Andes of Peru
  - Chila (Castilla), the tallest mountain in the Chila range
  - Chila (Castilla-Caylloma), another mountain in the Chila range
- Chila, a woreda of Tigray Region, Ethiopia

== Other uses ==
- Cheela (pancake), Indian pancake
- Cheela, fictional species
- Adrien Chila (born 1975), French racing driver
- Hugo Chila (born 1987), Ecuadorian athlete

== See also ==
- Chela (disambiguation)
- Chilla (disambiguation)
- Shila (disambiguation)
