= Chela =

Chela may refer to:

- Chela (fish), a genus of small minnow-type fish in the Cyprinid family
- Chela (organ), a pincer-like organ terminating certain limbs of some arthropods such as crabs
- Chela (meteorite), a meteorite fall of 1988 in Tanzania
- Chela (disciple), a student in the traditional Indian education system
- Chela (Mughal army), a rank in the Mughal army
- Chela, Ethiopia, a town in southern Ethiopia
- Chela (singer), an Australian electropop artist on the Kitsuné label
- Chela Garcia Irlando, American politician
- Juan Ignacio Chela (born 1979), a professional tennis player from Argentina
- Julian Chela-Flores, Venezuelan astrobiologist and physicist

== See also ==
- Chila (disambiguation)
- Quetzaltenango or Xela, a town in Guatemala
- Serra da Chela, a mountain range in Angola
