= Sheela (given name) =

- Gender: Female
- Language: Hindi

Origin
- Meaning: "character" "good conduct"
- Region of origin: India

Other names
- Related names: Sheila

Sheela (Hindi : शीला) is a Hindi Indian popular feminine given name, which means "character" and "good conduct".

== Notable people named Sheela ==
- Sheela Bhattarika, a 9th-century Sanskrit poet from India
- Sheela (born March 22, 1945), Indian actress
- Sheela Basrur (October 17, 1956 – June 2, 2008), Canadian physician
- Sheela Gautam (November 15, 1931 - June 8, 2019), Indian politician
- Sheela Gowda (born 1957), Indian contemporary artist and feminist
- Sheela Kaur (born August 2, 1989), Indian actress
- Sheela Lambert (born 1956), American civil rights activist and writer
- Sheela Murthy (born 1961), American-Indian lawyer
- Sheela Patel (born 1952), Indian urban planner

== Fictional characters ==
- Sheela Peryroyl, from Gary Gygax and Dave Arneson's tabletop role-playing game, Dungeons & Dragons
- Sheela, a recurring character in the Disney Channel TV series The Ghost and Molly McGee
