= Chilla, Punjab =

Chilla
- Village
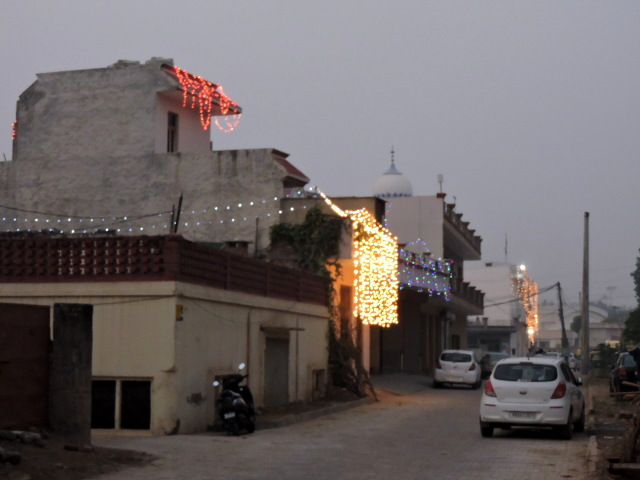
- Diwali festival in village Chilla, district Sahibzada Ajit Singh Nagar district, Punjab, India

- Punjab, India
- Coordinates: 30°39′39″N 76°43′25″E
- Country: India
- State: Punjab
- District: Sahibzada Ajit Singh Nagar district
- Block: Kharar

Population
  - Total: 756

Languages
  - Government: Punjabi
- Time zone: UTC+5:30 (IST)

Chilla is a village in Sahibzada Ajit Singh Nagar district of Punjab State in India.

== Diwali ==
The village has a unique tradition of celebrating Diwali a day after its actual date. The tradition is believed to have started decades ago when the village peasants used to gather their livestock at a common point in the village. The animals gathered were called chauna (Punjabi:ਚੌਣਾ) in local dialect. On the day of Diwali when people were preparing for worship for the festival, their animals have run away to some unknown place. The men left in search of the animals, while the women decided to wait on their worship for the men to return. The men returned home with animals past midnight; too late to celebrate the festival. Moreover, the villagers perceived that the Diwali day is not good for them their animals left them. Since then, the villagers have celebrated Diwali a day after the usual date.

== Gallery ==
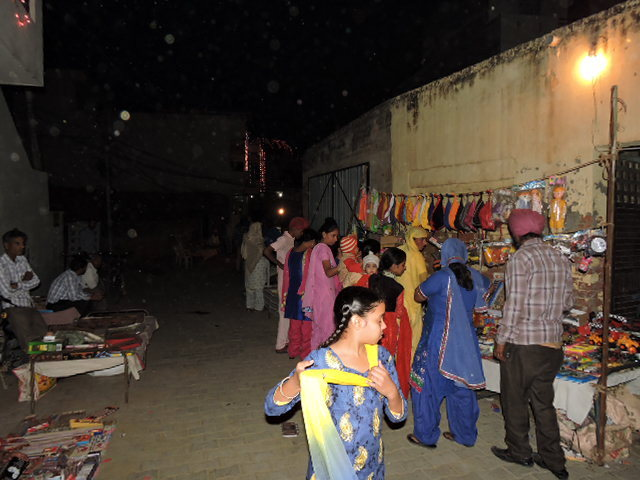
Shops on Diwali celebration

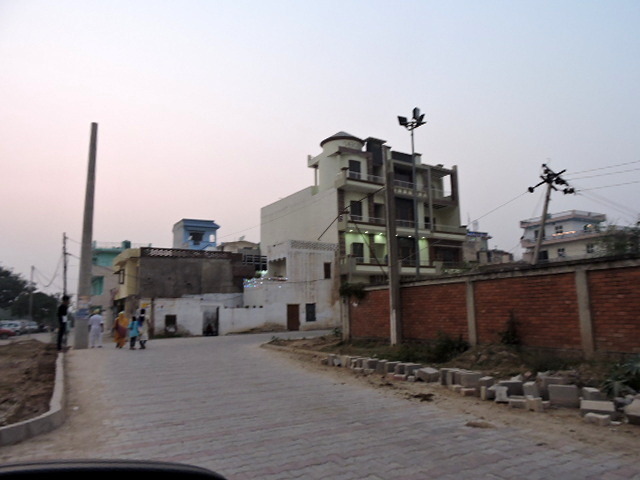
Village Chilla

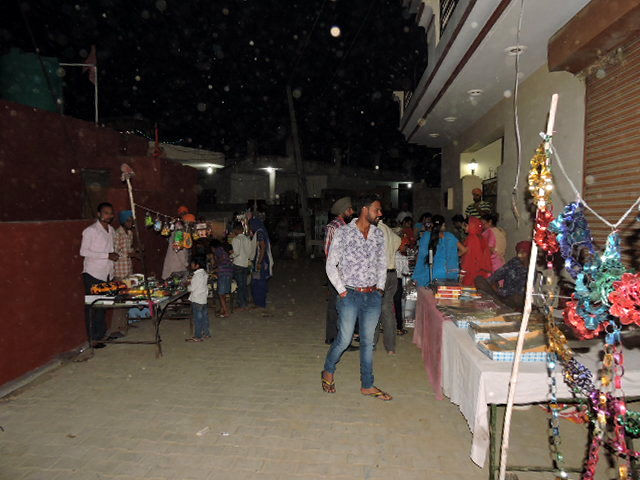
Shops on Diwali festival in village Chilla

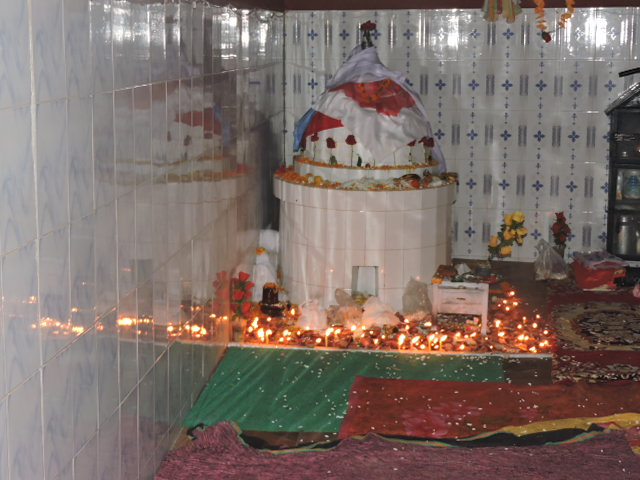
Worship on Nagar Kheda on Diwali festival in village Chilla

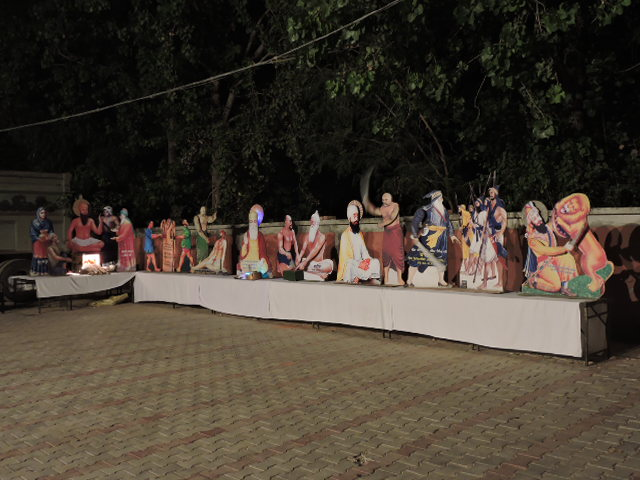
Exhibition of Sikh history in Gurdwara on Diwali festival
