= Shyla Angela Prasad =

Beauty pageant titleholder

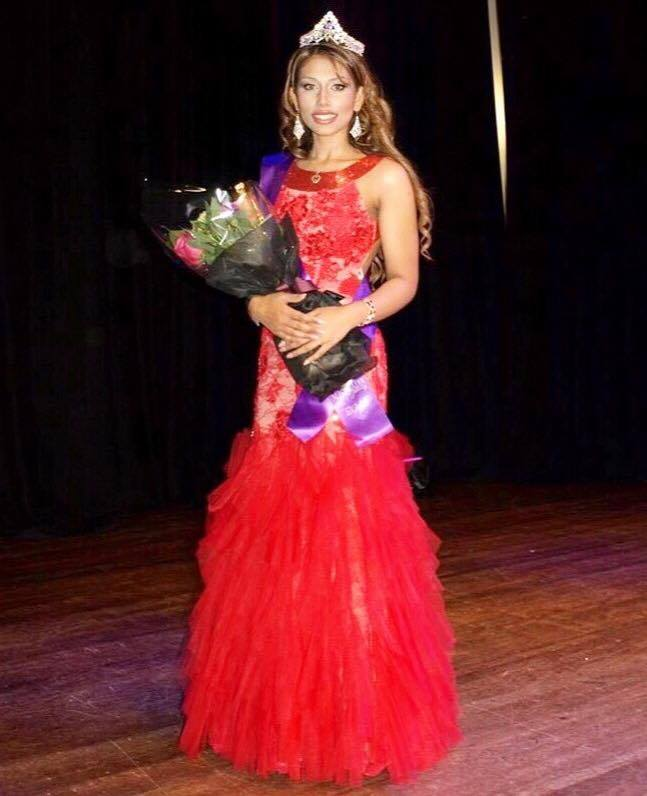
- Shyla Angela
- Education: University of Technology Sydney
- Beauty pageant titleholder
- Title: Miss Earth Fiji 2015 Miss Charity Galaxy Australia 2015 Miss Oceania 2017
- Major competition: Miss Earth Fiji 2015 Miss Galaxy Charity Australia 2015 Miss Oceania 2017

Shyla Angela Prasad (born 1996) is a lawyer, model, content creator and beauty pageant titleholder, holding the titles of Miss Australia, Miss Fiji and Miss Oceania.

== Personal life and career ==
Shyla Angela Prasad was born in Adelaide, Australia. She attended school at MLC and Hurlstone Agricultural High School. Shyla studied Law and Business at the University of Technology Sydney . She also studied Masters of Laws at University of New South Wales and acting at the National Institute of Dramatic Arts Sydney.

Prasad is an Australian solicitor and has worked in the legal and healthcare sectors.

Alongside her professional career, Prasad is a co-founder and director of Animal Rescue Sydney Ltd operating as Animal Rescue Crew Sydney (ARCS), a not-for-profit organisation dedicated to animal welfare. The organisation focuses on rescuing, rehabilitating and rehoming abandoned, neglected and vulnerable animals through a network of volunteer foster carers and veterinary partnerships.</ref>

Prasad is also involved in digital content creation, with a focus on lifestyle, fashion, animal welfare and community engagement.</ref>

== Pageantry ==
=== Miss Oceania 2017 ===
In 2017, Prasad was awarded the title of Miss Oceania 2017. She represented Oceania at the Miss Continents Pageant 2017 in Las Vegas, Nevada, where she won 'Best In Swimwear'.

=== Miss Earth Fiji 2015 ===
Prasad was awarded the title of Miss Earth Fiji 2015. She represented Fiji at the Miss Earth 2015 pageant on 5 December 2015 in Vienna, Austria. She won three gold medals and the Most Cheerful Award, the highest placement recorded for Fiji in Miss Earth.

=== Miss Galaxy Australia 2015 ===
In 2015, Prasad competed in the Miss Galaxy Australia pageant where she won the title of Miss Charity Galaxy Australia 2015.
