= Shila Devi =

Shila Devi Temple
- शिला देवी मंदिर
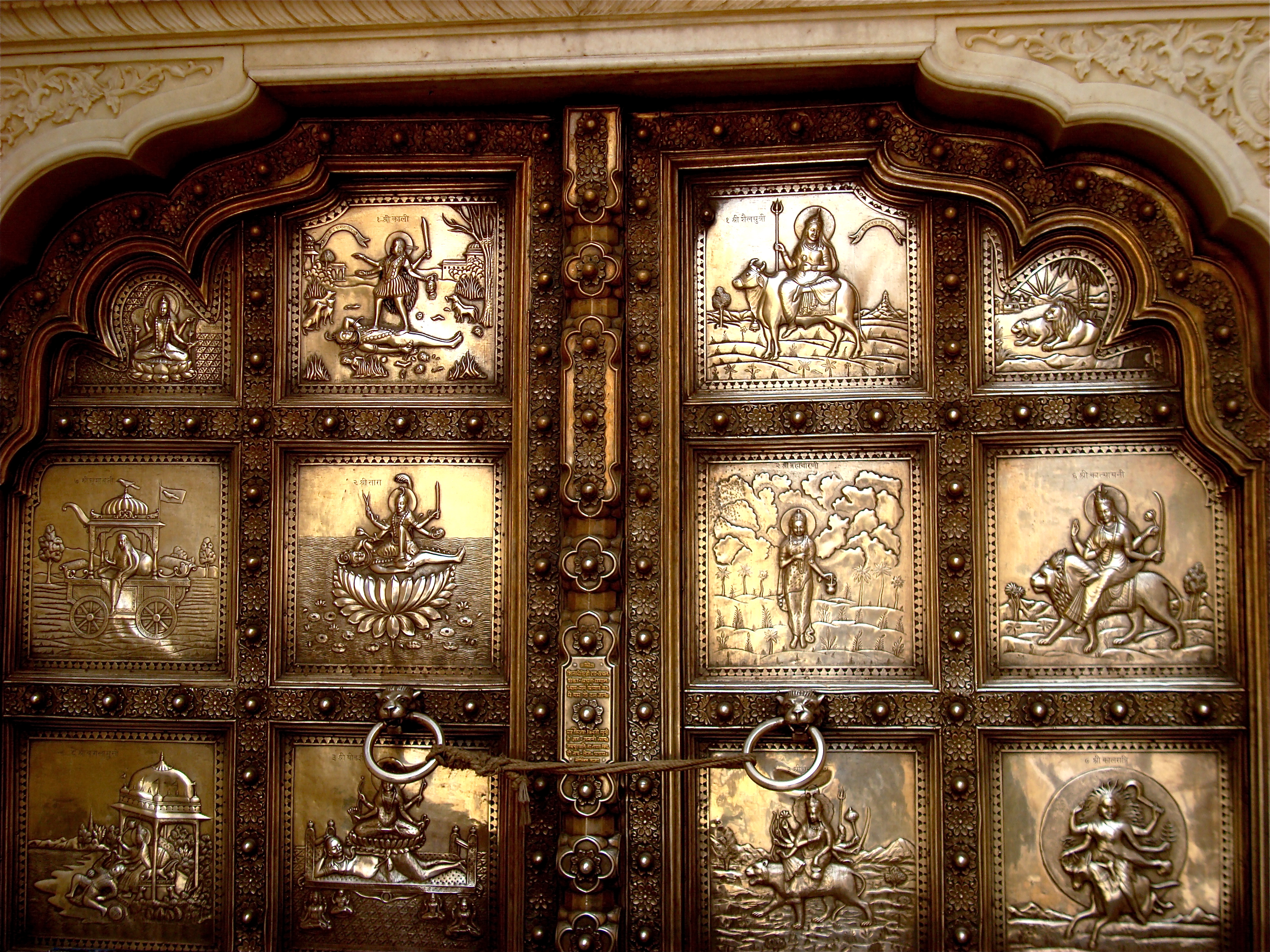
- Shila Devi Temple at Amer Fort, with depictions of the Mahavidyas and Navadurgas.

- Location in Rajasthan, India Shila Devi (India)

Religion
- Affiliation: Hinduism
- District: Jaipur
- Deity: Shila Devi (Durga)
- Festival: Navaratri (especially sixth day)

Location
- Location: Amer Fort, Jaipur, Rajasthan
- State: Rajasthan
- Country: India
- Coordinates: 26.98688°N 75.85047°E

Architecture
- Creator: Raja Man Singh I of Amber
- Established: 1604 CE

Shila Devi Temple शिला देवी मंदिर is a historic Hindu temple located inside the Amer Fort in Jaipur, Rajasthan. The temple is dedicated to Goddess Durga in her form as Shila Devi and is one of the prominent Shakti shrines in the region. It was established in 1604 CE by Raja Man Singh I, the general of Mughal Emperor Akbar, who brought the idol from Jessore (present-day Bangladesh) after a military expedition.

== History ==
According to legend, Raja Man Singh I was advised in a dream by the goddess to recover her idol from the sea in Jessore. A slab of stone (shila) was found, from which the idol was carved. Hence, the deity was named "Shila Devi". The idol was installed in the temple on the sixth day of the Navratri festival in 1604 CE.

== Architecture and location ==
The temple is situated within the premises of the historic Amer Fort and features typical Rajput architecture with intricately carved pillars, a sanctum sanctorum, and an idol made from a black stone slab. Devotees access the temple through a grand courtyard within the fort complex.

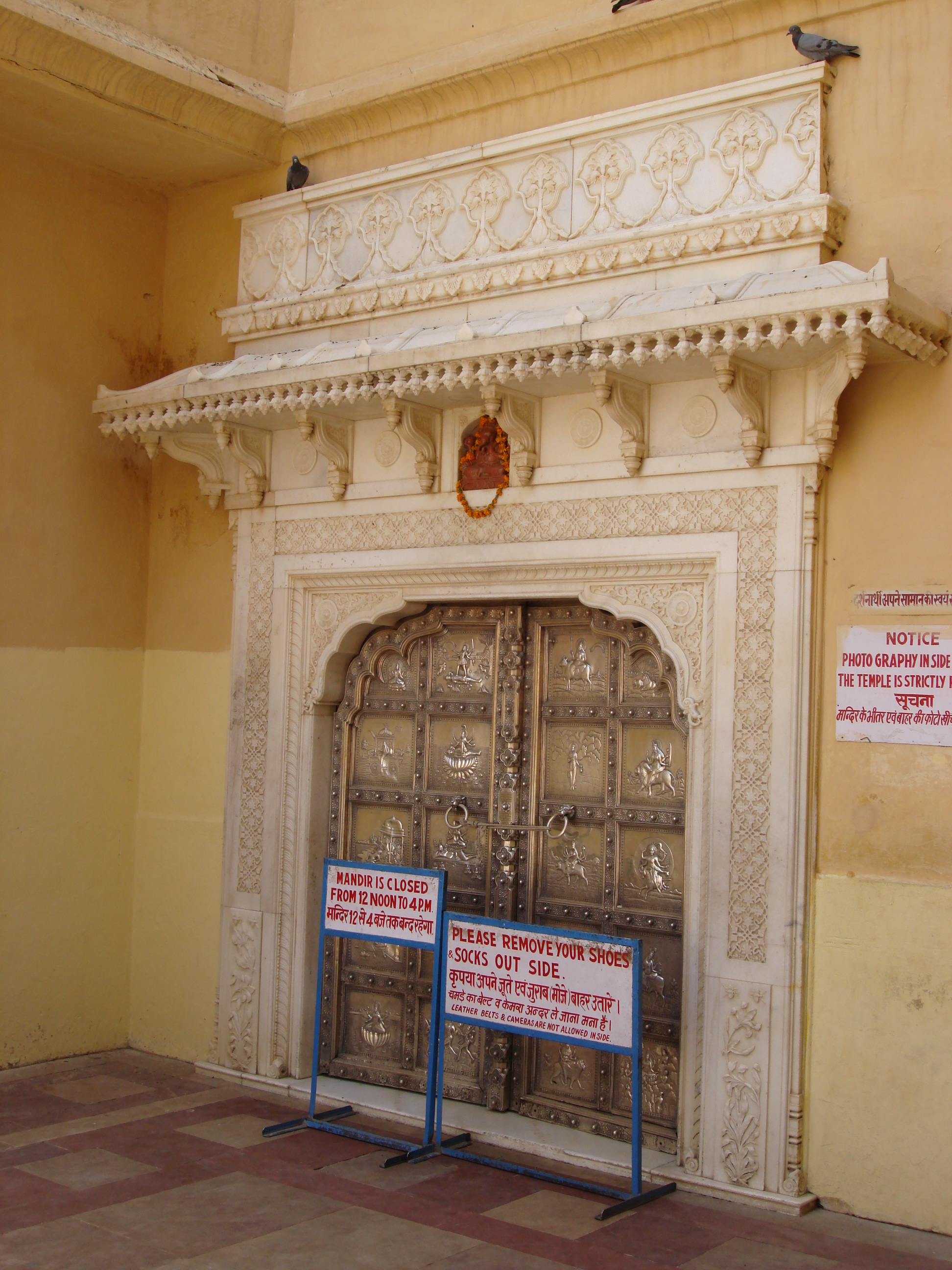
Gateway of Shila Devi Temple. From the 16th century until 1980, daily goat sacrifices were performed here. यहाँ १६वीं शती से १९८० तक प्रतिदिन बकरे की बलि दी जाती थी जो अब बंद हो गयी है।

== Worship and festivals ==
Shila Devi Temple is an important center of worship during Navratri, especially during the Chaitra Navratri and Gupt Navratri festivals when large numbers of devotees visit for special rituals and darshan. During ancient times, animal sacrifices were reportedly offered during festivals, although the practice has since been discontinued.

== Cultural significance ==
The temple holds immense religious and cultural value for devotees across Rajasthan and Bengal. It is also a major tourist attraction as part of the Amer Fort complex, which is a UNESCO World Heritage Site. Devotees believe that prayers at this temple fulfill wishes, especially during the ritual known as "Sheesh Dikhai", where the goddess is revealed through a special mirror.

== See also ==
- Amer Fort
- Durga
- Man Singh I
