= Khan Bhankri =

- village
- Location in Rajasthan, India Khan Bhankri (India)
- Coordinates: 26.9°N 76.4°E
- Country: India
- State: Rajasthan
- District: Dausa

Languages
  - Official: Hindi
- Time zone: UTC+5:30 (IST)
- ISO 3166 code: RJ-IN

Khan Bhankri (or simply Bhankri) is a village in the Dausa district of Rājasthān, India.This is most popular village in Dausa. There is a very popular tourist spot called Kile Wale Balaji in Khan Bhankri. This village is know as also village of Jangid(Rawat). This Village came in Ward No.55 of Dausa Nagar Parisad. There is a BJP Ward Member in this area.
