= Shakti Mata Memorial Chatriya =

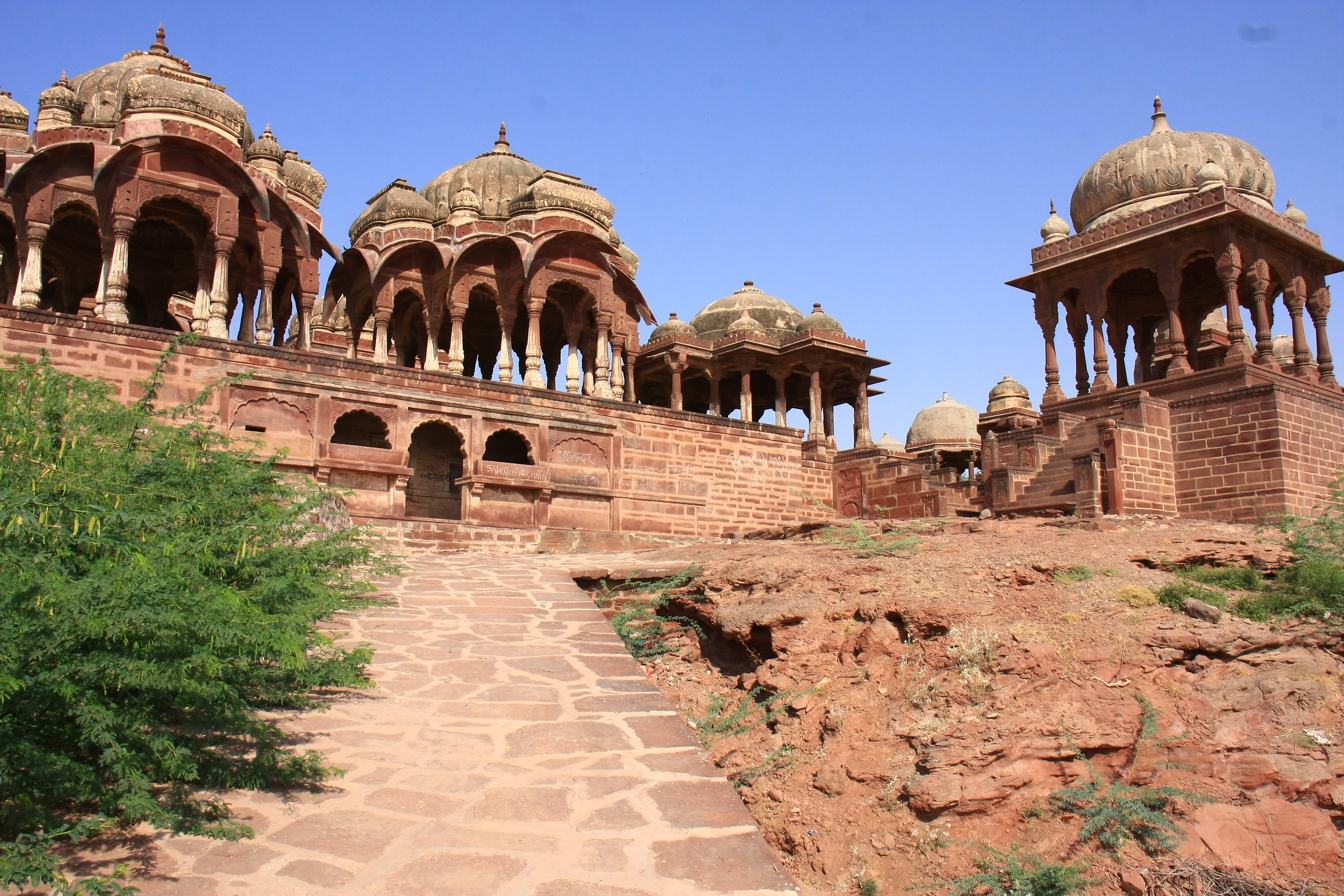
- Shakti Mata Memorial Chatriya: Surroundings, Side view, Inside view, Side view 2, View from downhill
- Location: Pokhran, Rajasthan, India
- Coordinates: 26.935833°N 71.912189°E
- Type: Cenotaph
- Material: red sandstone
- Width: 420

The Sati Mata Memorial Chatriya is a cenotaph in the city of Pokhran, Rajasthan, India. Constructed in red sandstone, it was erected to honor the deceased mahranis of the local royal family. The site contains a number of chhatris (meaning umbrella in hindi, which references the shape of the domes of the structure) and lies outside the city.

== See also ==
- Architecture of Rajasthan
- UNESCO Heritage Hill Forts of Rajasthan
