= Khoh =

Capital city of kingdom of amber

- AD 221/321–AD 1028/1128
- Status: Tributary state of Chauhans
- Religion: Hinduism
- Government: Monarchy
- Raja
  - AD 221/321 — 257/357: Chandrasen Chanda (first)
  - AD 977/1077 — 1028/1128: Alan Singh Chanda (last)
- Historical era: Medieval India
  - Established: AD 221/321
  - Disestablished: AD 1028/1128
Preceded by	Succeeded by
Yaudheyas	Kingdom of Amber
- Today part of: Rajasthan, Republic of India

Khoh, also known as Kho, Khohgang or Khoh Gong, was a historical settlement in present-day Jaipur, Rajasthan, India, identified with present-day Khoh Nagoriyan. Which was located just five miles to the east of Jaipur city and was ruled by the Chanda clan of Meenas. Rao Chandrasen Chanda abandoned Mahishmati city and established a kingdom here. It was the capital of the Chandas till the 12th century and of the Kachhawahas from the 12th to the 13th century.

== Geography ==
Khoh was a historical settlement in present-day Rajasthan, located approximately 50 km west of Dausa and 14 km south of Amber.

== History ==
=== Chieftainship ===
Khoh has been the historical capital of Dhundhar, which was ruled by the Chanda clan of Meenas.

=== Chief ===
Historian Jadunath Sarkar, in A History of Jaipur, identifies the ruler of Khoh as Chanda. Scholar Shyam Singh Ratnawat, in Kachhawan Ri Vanshavali, gives his name as Alansi and describes him as belonging to the Chanda subgroup of the Meenas. Researcher Madan Meena refers to the chief as Alan Singh Chanda in his discussion of Khoh Gong.

=== Kachwaha conquest ===
Dulha Rai, the last ruler of the Kachchhapaghata dynasty, attacked it and defeated the Chandas. Dulha shifted his capital here from Dausa, which was later changed to Amber by Kakil Deo. But some sources attribute the change of capital from Khoh to Ambar to Rajdeo who was the third in succession after Pajawan.

== List of rulers ==
The list of rulers are as follows:

- Rao Chandrasen Chanda (c. 221/321 — 257/357 CE)
- Rao Budhsen (c. 257/357 — 293/393 CE)
- Mahasen (c. 293/393 — 329/429 CE)
- Bhurpal (c. 329/429 — 365/465 CE)
- Devpal (c. 365/465 — 401/501 CE)
- Rao Bijal (c. 401/501 — 437/537 CE)
- Rao Balansi (c. 437/537 — 473/573 CE)
- Rao Airavan (c. 473/573 — 509/609 CE)
- Rao Bhupal (c. 509/609 — 545/645 CE)
- Kishanpal (c. 545/645 — 581/681 CE)
- Rao Pitha (c. 581/681 — 617/717 CE)
- Rao Jorasi (c. 617/717 — 653/753 CE)
- Rao Manik (c. 653/753 — 689/789 CE)
- Rao Jaichand (c. 689/789 — 725/825 CE)
- Sodha-Dev (c. 725/825 — 761/861 CE)
- Abaychand (c. 761/861 — 797/897 CE)
- Ran Rao (c. 797/897 — 833/933 CE)
- Gono Rao (c. 833/933 — 869/969 CE)
- Satnam Rao (c. 869/969 — 905/1005 CE)
- Rao Sridhar (c. 905/1005 — 941/1041 CE)
- Rao Sulpan (c. 941/1041 — 977/1077 CE)
- Alan Singh Chanda (c. 977/1077 — 1028/1128 CE)

=== Rulers of Kachhwaha clan ===
- Dulha Rai (1028/1128-36)
- Kakil Deo (1036/1136-39)
- Hanu Deo (1039/1139-53)
- Janddeo (1053/1153-70)
- Pajawan (1070/1170-94)
- Malayasi (1094/1194-1146/1246)
- Vijaldeo (1146/1246-79)
- Rajdeo (1179/1279-1216/1316)

== Sources ==
- Saraswat, Rawat. Meena Itiyas. pp. 125–126, 277–278.
