= Dhundhar =

Historical region in Rajasthan, India

Dhundhar ḍhūnḍhāṛ ɖʱũːɖʱaːɽ
- Region
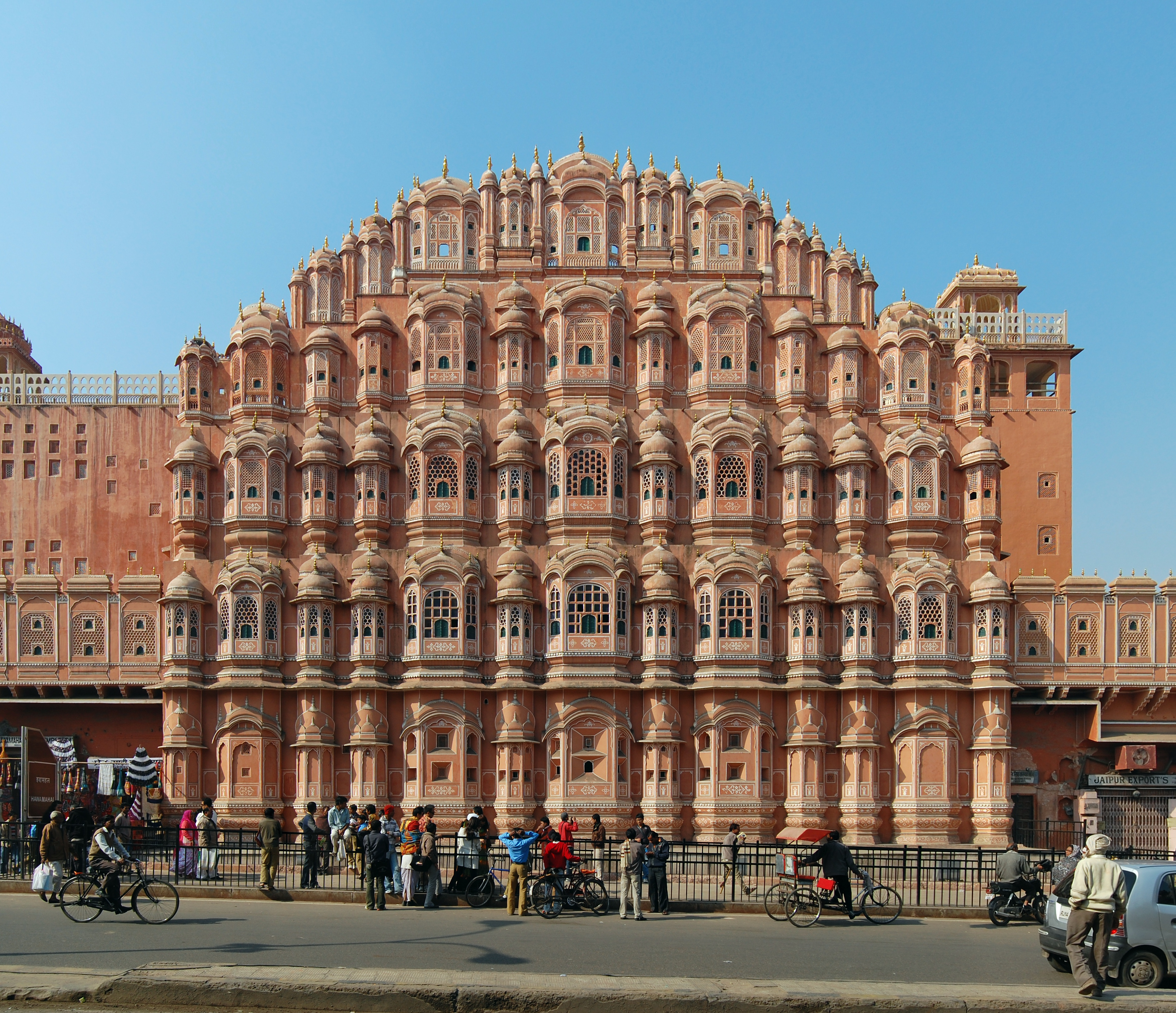
- Hawa Mahal, Jaipur
- Interactive map of Dhundhar
- Coordinates: 26.9260°N 75.8235°E
- Country: India
- State: Rajasthan

Government
  - Principal ruling dynasties: Meenas Kachwaha Rajputs
  - Successor political entities: Jaipur State

Historical
  - Historic language: Dhundhari
  - Historic capitals: Khoh, Dausa, Amer, and Jaipur

Dhundhar (Hindi: ḍhūnḍhāṛ, pronounced [ɖʱũːɖʱaːɽ]), also known as the Jaipur region, is a cultural, geographical, and historical region in the eastern part of the Indian state of Rajasthan. Historically, it formed the core territory of the Kachwaha rulers and later the Jaipur State. The region is centred on Jaipur and traditionally includes parts of the present-day districts of Jaipur, Dausa, Tonk, Sawai Madhopur, Kotputli-Behror, Karauli, and adjoining areas. The precise historical extent of Dhundhar has varied over time and differs among historical sources.

The region lies in east-central Rajasthan. It is bounded by the Aravalli Range to the northwest, the Ajmer-Merwara region to the west, Mewar to the southwest, Hadoti to the south, and the historical regions of Mewat and Braj to the east and northeast.

== Geography ==
Historically, the region covered approximately 15,579 square miles (40,349 km^{2}) during the late nineteenth and early twentieth centuries under Jaipur State.

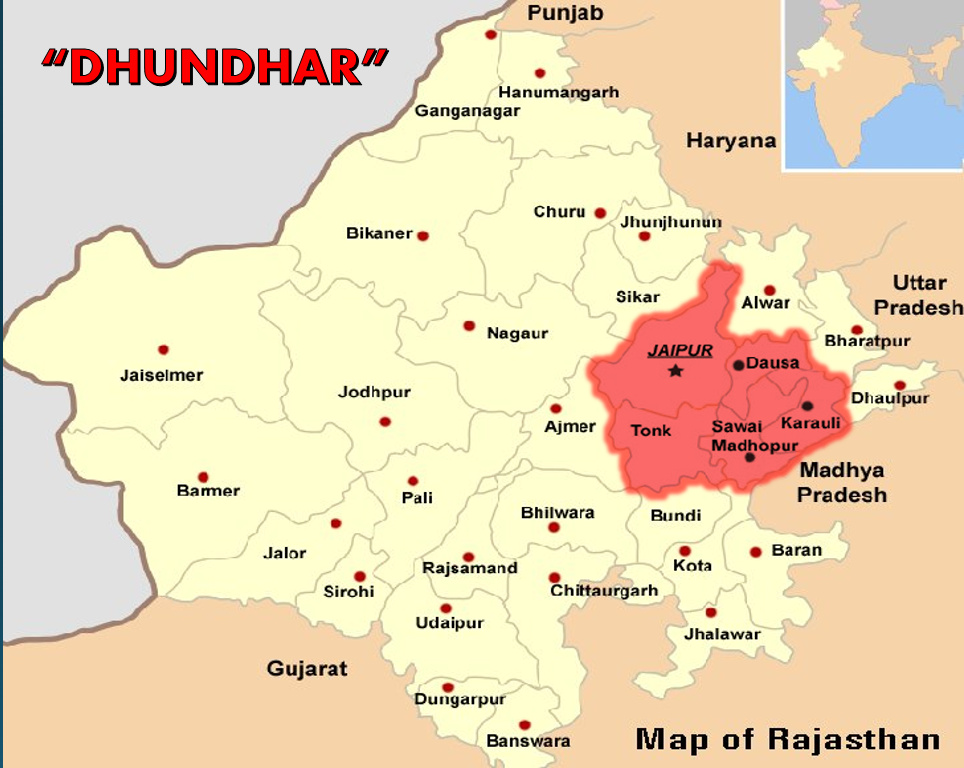
Map showing the traditional extent of the Dhundhar region.

Much of Dhundhar lies within the drainage basin of the Banas River and its seasonal tributaries, including the Dhund River, from which the region derives its name. The northern part of the region is drained by the Banganga River, which originates near Jaipur and flows eastwards before joining the Yamuna in Uttar Pradesh.

== History ==
Before the rise of Dulha Rai, the Dhundhar region contained several local centres of power, including Dausa, Devti, Manchi, Khoh, Amer, Getor and Jhotwara.

The history of Dhundhar is closely associated with the rise of the Kachwaha dynasty. According to historical accounts, Dulha Rai, generally regarded as the founder of Kachwaha power in the region, established his authority in Dhundhar after defeating Alan Singh Chanda, a ruler of the Chanda dynasty.

Dulha Rai, who is traditionally identified as the last ruler of the Kachchhapaghata dynasty of Gwalior, subsequently established himself at Dausa and made Khoh his capital before the expansion of Kachwaha authority into other parts of the region.

According to Harnath Singh Dundlod, Khoh was ruled by a Meena chief named Chandu Ram before Dulha Rao seized the settlement from him. Following Dulha Rao's death, the Meenas regained control of Khoh. Dundlod further states that Kakil Deo, Dulha Rao's son, later fought a battle against Rao Bhatoo, described as the holder of the estate, and re-annexed Khoh to the Kachwaha domain.

During his reign, Dulha Rai consolidated his territories by incorporating the neighbouring area of Manchi into Dhundhar. He was succeeded by his son, Kakil, who defeated the Susawat rulers of Amer and transferred the capital from Khoh to Amer. Amer subsequently emerged as the principal seat of the Kachwaha rulers until the foundation of Jaipur in the eighteenth century.

== Culture ==
Dhundhar has historically been an important centre of Jainism, particularly under the patronage of the Kachwaha rulers of Amer and later Jaipur. Their relatively liberal religious policies facilitated the establishment and growth of numerous Jain temples, educational institutions, and monastic centres in the region.

The region occupies a significant place in the history of Digambara Jainism. During the seventeenth century, the Bispanth–Terapanth divisions among the Digambara Jains emerged in the Jaipur region.

During the same period, the seat of the Bhattarakas of the Mula Sangh Saraswati Gaccha, originally located at Chittorgarh, was transferred successively to Sanganer, Amer, and finally Jaipur. The Jaipur seat continued until 1965.

The succession of the Bhattarakas is as follows:

- Narendrakirti (Vikram Samvat 1691, Sanganer)
- Surendrakirti (Vikram Samvat 1722, Amer)
- Jagatkirti
- Devendrakirti
- Mahendrakirti
- Kshemendrakirti (Vikram Samvat 1815, Jaipur)
- Surendrakirti
- Sukhendrakirti
- Nayankirti
- Devendrakirti
- Mahendrakirti
- Chandrakirti
