= Dulha Rai =

Raja of Khoh from 1006 to 1036

- Raja of Khoh

1st Kachhwaha Ruler of Amber
- Reign: 1028 – 28 November 1036
- Predecessor: Alan Singh
- Successor: Raja Kakil Deo

Raja of Dhundhar
- Reign: 15 December 1006 – 28 November 1036
- Coronation: 15 December 1006; Dausa

Raja of Amethi
- Reign: 1006/1007–1036/1037
- Predecessor: Raja Sorha Deva
- Successor: Raja Indramani Singh
- Born: Narwar
- Died: 28 November 1036; Khoh
- Spouse: Maroni
Regnal name
- Dulhe Rae
- Dynasty: Kachhwaha
- Father: Sorha Deva
- Religion: Hinduism

Dulha Rai (died 28 November 1036) was the founder of the Kachhwaha dynasty and also the 1st king from this dynasty who ruled the Kingdom of Amber in Dhundar region, with his capital at Khoh in present-day Rajasthan. He started his rule from Dausa which he obtained as a dowry from the Chahamanas of Shakambhari. Making Dausa as his base, he started conquering the region of Dhundhar and soon was recognised as the ruler of this region by the Chahamanas after he successfully suppressed the rebellious Bargujar Rajputs.

== History ==
The Kachwaha Rajputs claim descent from Kusha, son of the legendary Rama. Their ancestors allegedly migrated from Rama's kingdom of Kosala and established a new dynasty at Gwalior. After 31 generations, they moved to Rajputana and took away the kingdom of Dhundhar from Alan Singh Chanda.

Some historians associate Dulha Rao, the founder of the Jaipur Kachhwaha lineage, with the Kachchhapaghata dynasty that ruled over a part of Rajasthan and Madhya Pradesh in 10th century. It is possible that Dulha Rao descended from the Narwar branch of this dynasty. VS Bhargava associates Dulha with the successor of the last ruler of the Nawar branch, Tejaskaran.

According to Jadunath Sarkar, Dulha's grandfather Ishwar Singh, the ruler of Narwar, renounced his throne and divided his estate among his younger brother and his nephew and travelled North of Chambal to live a life of religious recluse. After his death, his son Sodha crowned himself king again but soon died and was succeeded by his son Dulha who built support for his cause and soon received the fort of Dausa in dowry from the Chauhans of Lalsot. M. L. Sharma suggests that Dulha was placed in Dausa particularly to help fight the Bargujar chief who partly controlled the city. Dulharai defeated Alan Singh Chanda, the ruler of the Chanda dynasty and captured Dhudhand. Dulha Rao soon defeated the Meenas of Khoh and Manchi and later completed the conquest of Dhundhar by defeating the Bargurjar after which he was granted the captured land by the Chauhans. Dulha chose Khoh as his capital after Dausa.

== Death and succession ==
Dulha Rai died at Khoh in Rajasthan in 1036 and Kakil Dev was chosen as his successor.
