= Kakil =

Raja of Khoh from 1036 to 1039

- Raja of Khoh

2nd Kachhwaha Ruler of Amber
- Reign: 28 November 1036 – 20 April 1039
- Predecessor: Dulha Rai
- Successor: Raja Hanu Deo
- Born: Khoh
- Died: 20 April 1039; Khoh
Regnal name
- Kankil
- Dynasty: Kachhwaha
- Father: Dulha Rai
- Mother: Maroni
- Religion: Hinduism

Kakil (died 20 April 1039), also known as Kankil, was the king of the Kachhwaha dynasty from 1036 to 1039. He succeeded Dulha Rai, who ruled the Dhundhar region with their capital at Khoh in present-day Rajasthan.

== Early life ==
Kakil was born to mother Maruni and father Dulha Rai. While some sources present Dulha Rai as his grandfather.

== Reign ==
Dulha Rai died in 1036 AD, after which Kakil was crowned the Kachhwaha king. Whereas according to Jadunath Sarkar, he became the success of Dulha Rai in 1070 AD.

According to Madan Meena, Kakil was born after the death of his father, Dulha Rai, whose pregnant wife escaped during an attack by the Meenas.

According to Harnath Singh Dundlod, Khoh was ruled by a Meena chief named Chandu Ram before Dulha Rao seized the settlement from him. Following Dulha Rao's death, the Meenas regained control of Khoh. Dundlod further states that Kakil Deo, Dulha Rao's son, later fought a battle against Rao Bhatoo, described as the holder of the estate, and re-annexed Khoh to the Kachwaha domain.

Kakil's short reign was troubled by frequent Meena revolts. In the middle of the 12th century, whenever a Meena chief grew strong, he would launch an attack on Kakil. Nevertheless, Kakil eventually suppressed these revolts and maintained his control over Amber and the surrounding territories.

In some sources, the victory over Amber has been attributed to Kakil. Whereas this victory is of his son Maidul Rao which happened in 1150 AD.

== Death ==
Kakil died in the Khoh in 1039 AD.
