= Susawat =

Clan of Meenas in India

Susawat is a clan of Meena tribe. They were the Chiefs/Rulers over the historical region of India called Amber (Modern day region around Jaipur).

== History ==
Amber was ruled by the Susawat of Meenas tribe. He was defeated by Raja Kakil Deo kachwaha, the son of Raja Dulherai kachwaha and after Khoh, Amber was made the capital of (kachwaha) Dhundhar.
