= Rawat Saraswat =

Indian poet

- Born: 22 January 1921; Churu, Rajasthan
- Died: 16 December 1989 (aged 68)
- Occupation: Poet
- Parents: Hanumanprasad Saraswat (father); Bnarasi Devi (mother)
- Awards: Deepchand Sahitya Award, Rajasthan Ratnakar, Rajasthan Sahitya Sangam Academy, Bikaner

Rawat Saraswat was a distinguished Indian poet, editor, critic and scholar who focused on the Rajasthani language.

Saraswat received a Bachelor of Laws degree and a Masters in Hindi. He also founded Maruvani, the first Rajasthani journal devoted to the study of that language and literature. In addition to writing his own Rajasthani poetry, Saraswat also edited old Rajasthani texts and compiled a "Who's Who" of Rajasthani writers. He was also noted for his essays.

He was awarded a Rajasthan Sahitya Akademi award.

== Bibliography ==
- Aaj Ri Kavitavan (Anthology of Contemporary Rajasthani Poetry) compiled and edited by Hiralal Maheshwari and Rawat Saraswat, 1987.

== See also ==
- List of Indian poets
