= Dausa =

- City
- Nickname: Deva Nagari
- Location in Rajasthan Location in India Location in Asia
- Coordinates: 26.8932°N 76.3375°E
- Country: India
- State: Rajasthan
- Division: Jaipur
- District: Dausa

Government
  - Type: Municipal Council
  - Body: Dausa Municipal Council
  - Chairman: Mamta Choudhary (INC)

Area
  - Total: 44 km^{2} (17 sq mi)
- Elevation: 327 m (1,073 ft)

Population (2023)
  - Total: 128,000
  - Density: 2,900/km^{2} (7,500/sq mi)

Language
  - Official: Hindi
  - Additional official: English
- Time zone: UTC+5:30 (IST)
- PIN: 303303
- Area code(s): +91-1427
- Vehicle registration: RJ-29
- Website: dausa.rajasthan.gov.in

Dausa is a city and administrative headquarters of Dausa district in the state of Rajasthan, India. It is 55 km from Jaipur, 240 km from Delhi and located on Jaipur-Agra National Highway (NH-21).

== Etymology ==
The name Dausa (Hindi: दौसा) is derived from a Sanskrit word Dhau-Sa which means "Beautiful like Heaven".

== History ==
Dausa is situated in the historical region of Dundhar and served as its first capital. Prior to Indian independence in 1947, Dausa was part of the princely state of Jaipur ruled by the Kachhwaha Rajput dynasty. Originally governed by the Chauhan Rajputs in the 10th century CE, control passed to Kachhwaha Raja Sodh Dev (r. 996-1006 CE). He was succeeded by his son, Raja Dulha Rai, who ruled Dhundhar from Dausa for three decades before moving to Khoh in 1028 CE.

Dausa has given prominent freedom fighters to the nation. Tikaram Paliwal and Ram Karan Joshi gave their valuable contribution for the fight for independence and in formation of the state of Rajasthan. Tikaram Paliwal was elected the Chief Minister of Rajasthan in 1952. Ram Karan Joshi was the first Panchayati Raj Minister of Rajasthan who submitted the first Panchayati Raj Bill in the Vidhansabha in 1952.

The poet Sunderdas was born on Chaitra Shukla Navami in Vikram Samvat 1653 in Dausa. He was a renowned Nirgun Panthi Sant and wrote 42 Grantha, out of which Gyan Sundaram & Sunder Vilas are famous.

== Geography ==
Dausa is located at 26.88°N 76.33°E. It has an average elevation of 333 metres (1072 feet). It is located in Dausa district, one of the 5 Districts of Jaipur division (Alwar, Dausa, Jaipur, Jhunjhunun, Sikar).

== Demographics ==
As of 2011 Indian census, Dausa town had a total population of 85,960. Males constitute 45,369 of the population and females 40,591. Dausa has an average literacy rate of 69.17%, lower than the national average of 74.04%: male literacy is 84.54% and, female literacy is 52.33%. In Dausa, 11,042 of the population is under 6 years of age.

=== Religion ===
Religion in Dausa(2011)
Religion	Percent(%)
Hinduism	84.69%
Islam	14.11%
Jainism	0.66%
Christianity	0.16%
Sikhism	0.15%
Others and no religion	0.23%

The religious groups represented in Dausa as of 2011 include Hindus (84.99%), Muslims (14.11%), Jains (0.66%), Christians (0.16%) and Sikhs (0.15%).

== Culture ==
=== Stone carving ===
Sikandra is situated at 25 km from Dausa on NH-21 towards Agra. This place has made its mark in the domestic as well as international market for its sandstone carvings.

=== Local festivals ===
==== Basant Panchmi Mela ====
Basant Panchami Mela is organized every February in Baradari Mela Maidan with the worship of idols of Raghunathji, Narsinghji, and the god Surya. The festival is celebrated for a month, with a large local market for villagers to procure essential requirements for the entire year. Besides this, it has all arrangements for rural entertainment. Therefore, it has very much attention and importance for rural population scattered in the district.

=== Tourism ===
There are many places in and near Dausa to visit such as:

- Abhaneri: It is known for its post-Gupta or early medieval monuments. It is situated at about 33 km from Dausa towards Bandikui. The Chand Baori (Step Well) and Harshat Mata Temple are the important places to visit.
- Bhandarej: Bhandarej is known for the walls, sculptures, decorative latticework, and terracotta utensils found in the excavation. Bhandarej also has 18th-century step-well called Bhandrej Baori.
- Khawaraoji: Khawaraoji was the residence of the then ruler Raoji and Jaiman purohits. It is situated at about 25 km from Dausa.
- Jhajhirampura : Jhajhirampura is known for the natural water tank and temples of Rudra (Shiv), Balaji (Hanuman), Bhairav nath ji, Devnarayan chouhan ji temple and other religious god and goddess.
- Khan Bhankri : Khan Bhankri is known for Kile Wale Balaji. There is a Mountain where the water inside a well never empty, People says that after taking thousands of liters of water there is no effect on water level. There is Shiva, Balaji Temple on the peak of mountain.
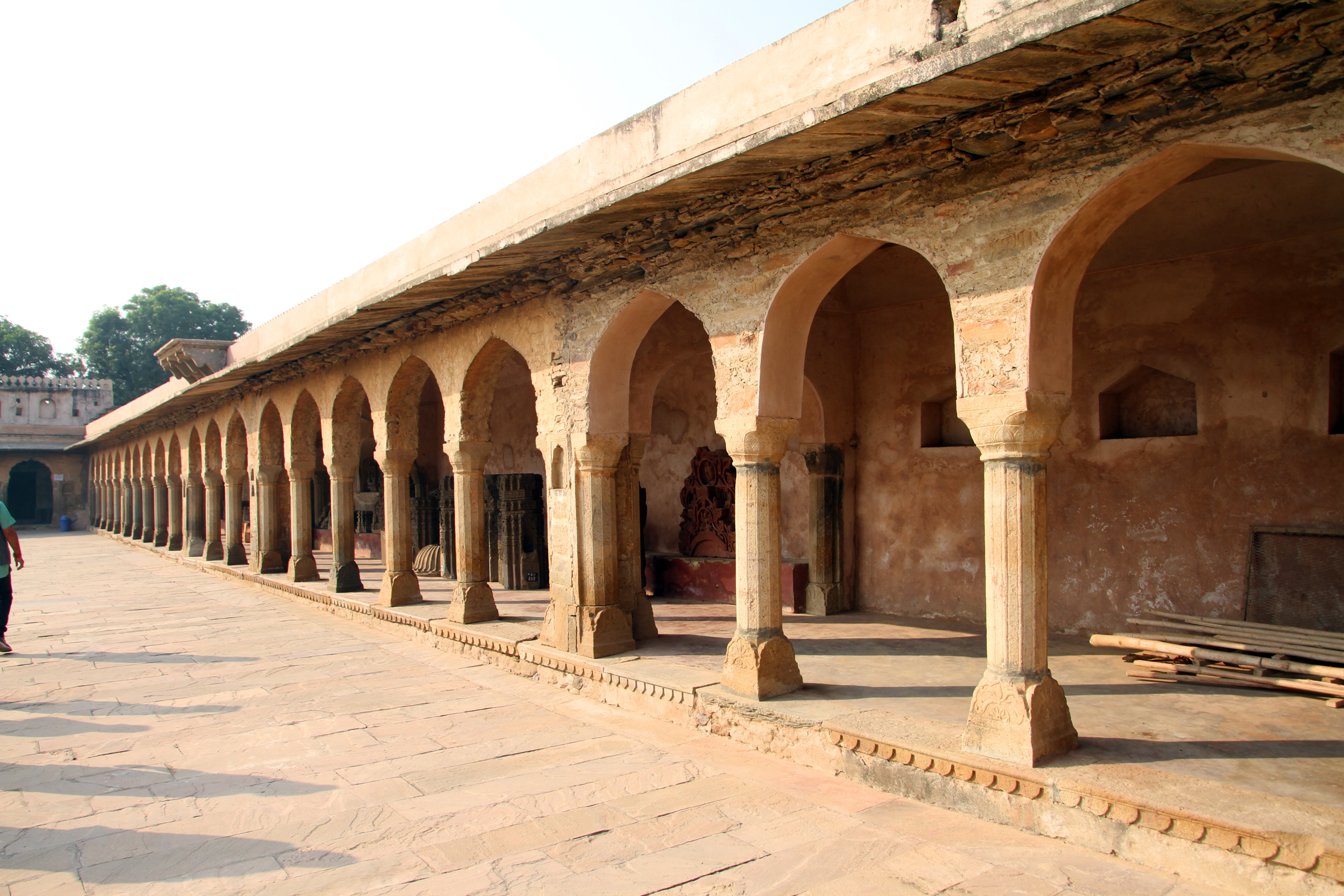
Chand Baori

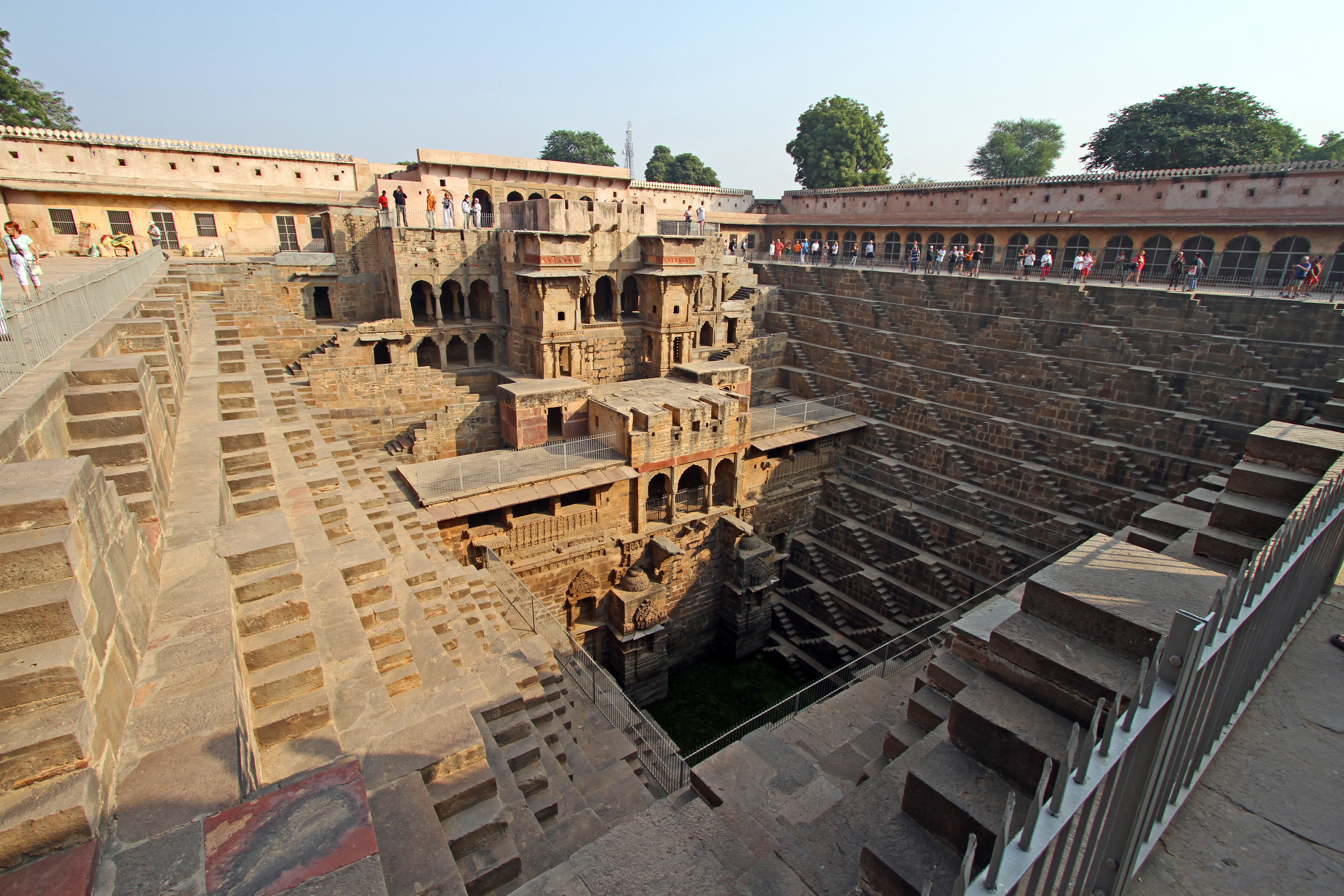
Chand Baori stepwell

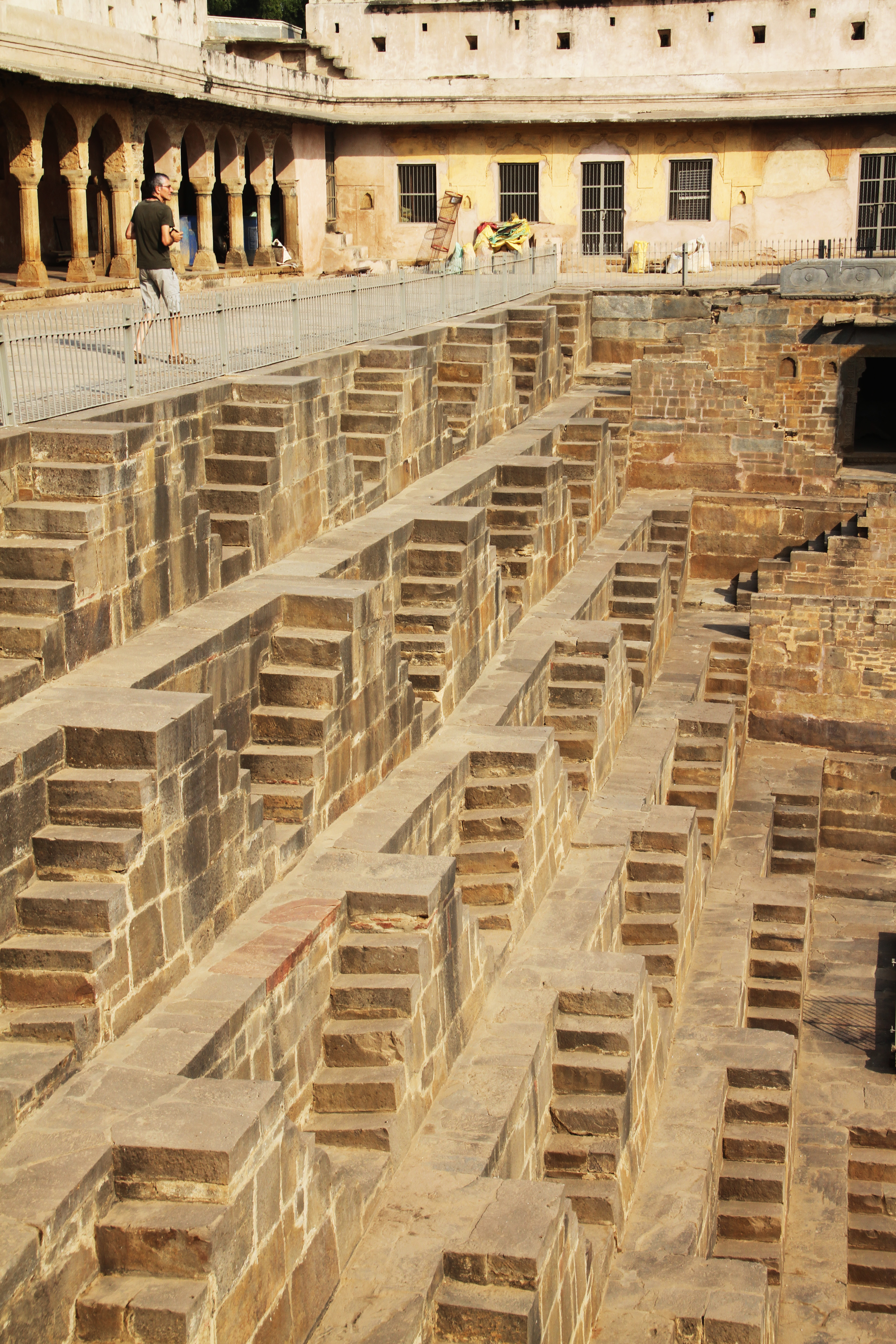
Chand Baori steps

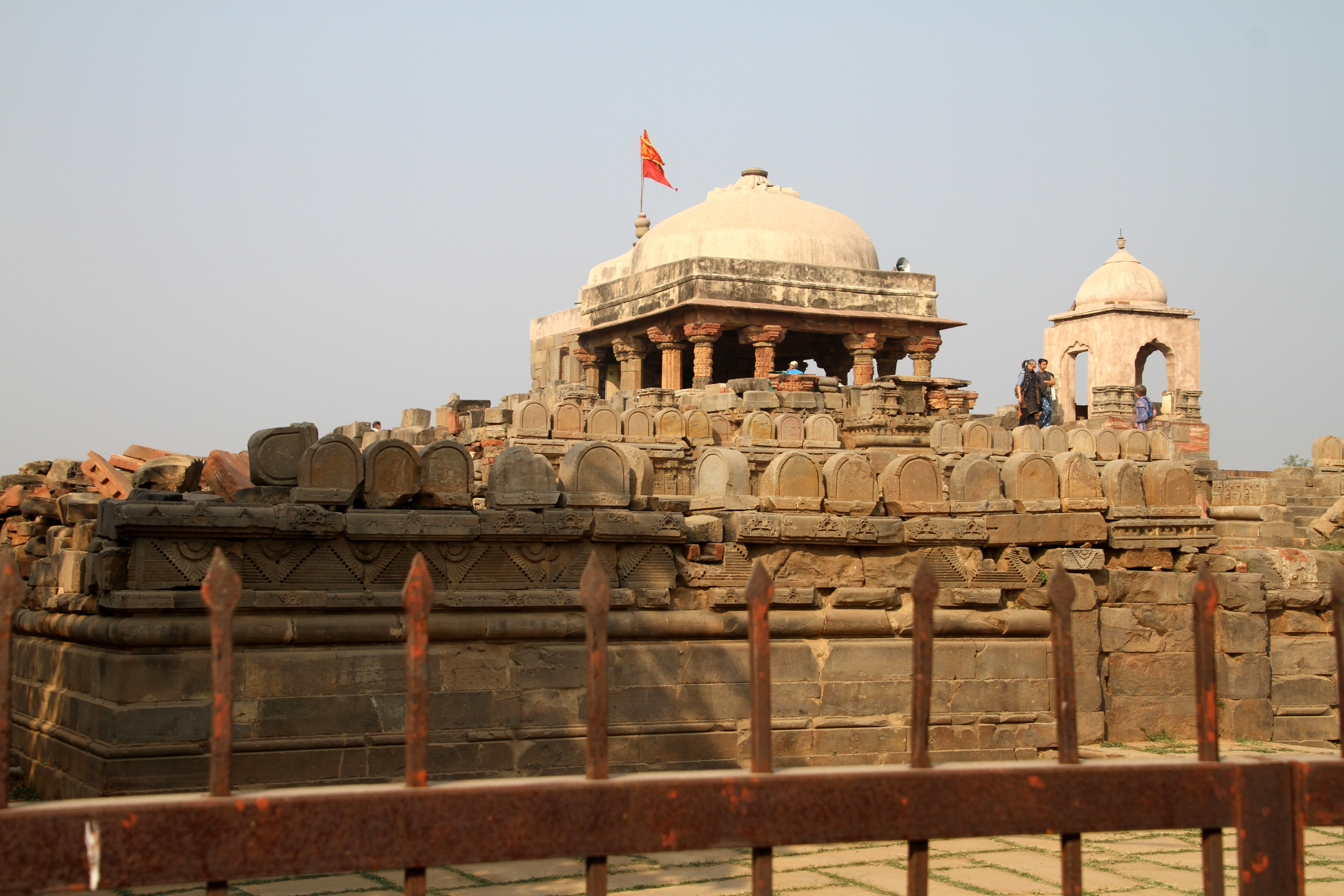
Harsat Mata ka Mandir

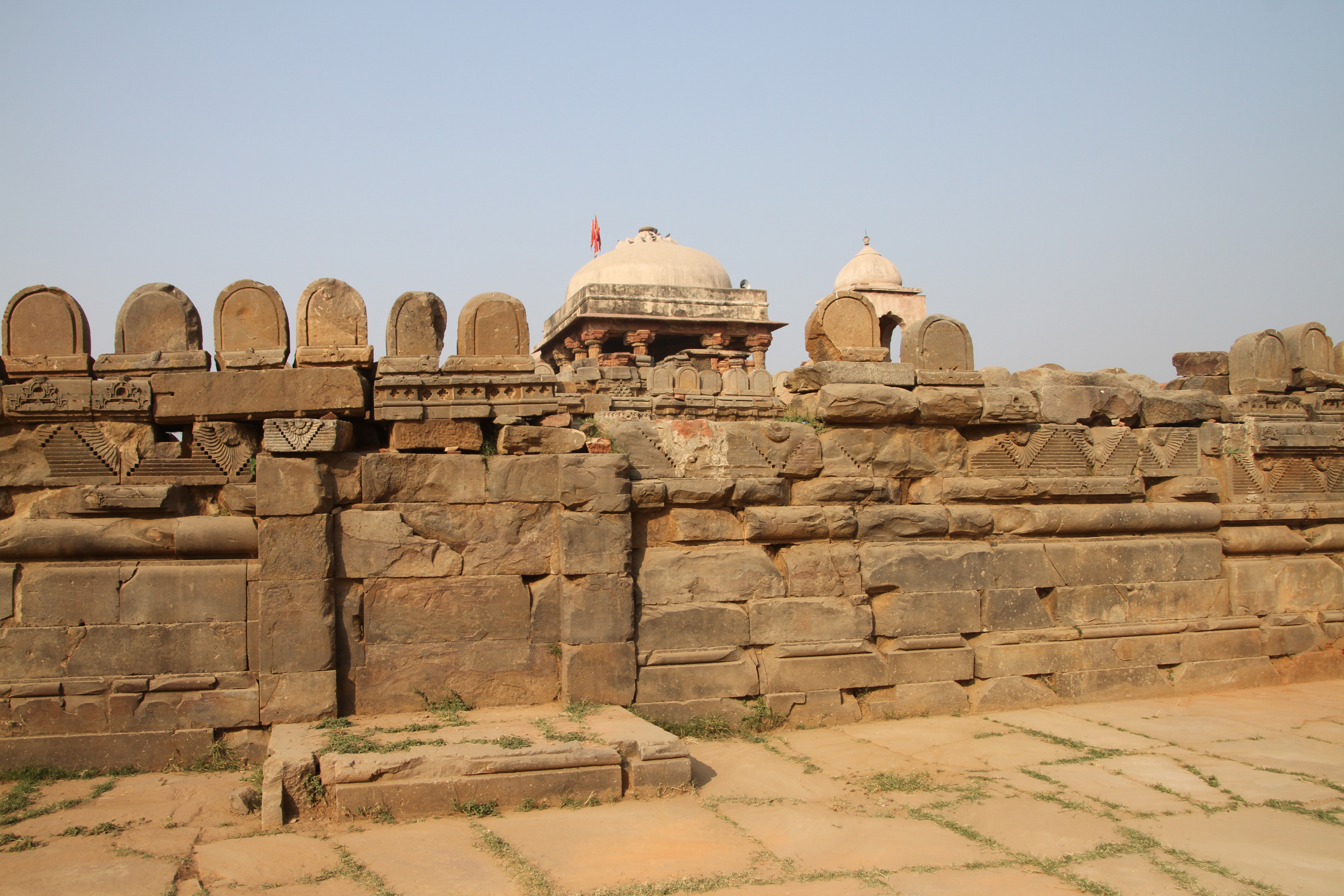
Harsat Mata ka Mandir

==== Temples and religious spots ====
- Mehandipur Balaji Temple: The temple of Bajrang Bali (Hanuman) god is known for treatment of mentally disturbed people.

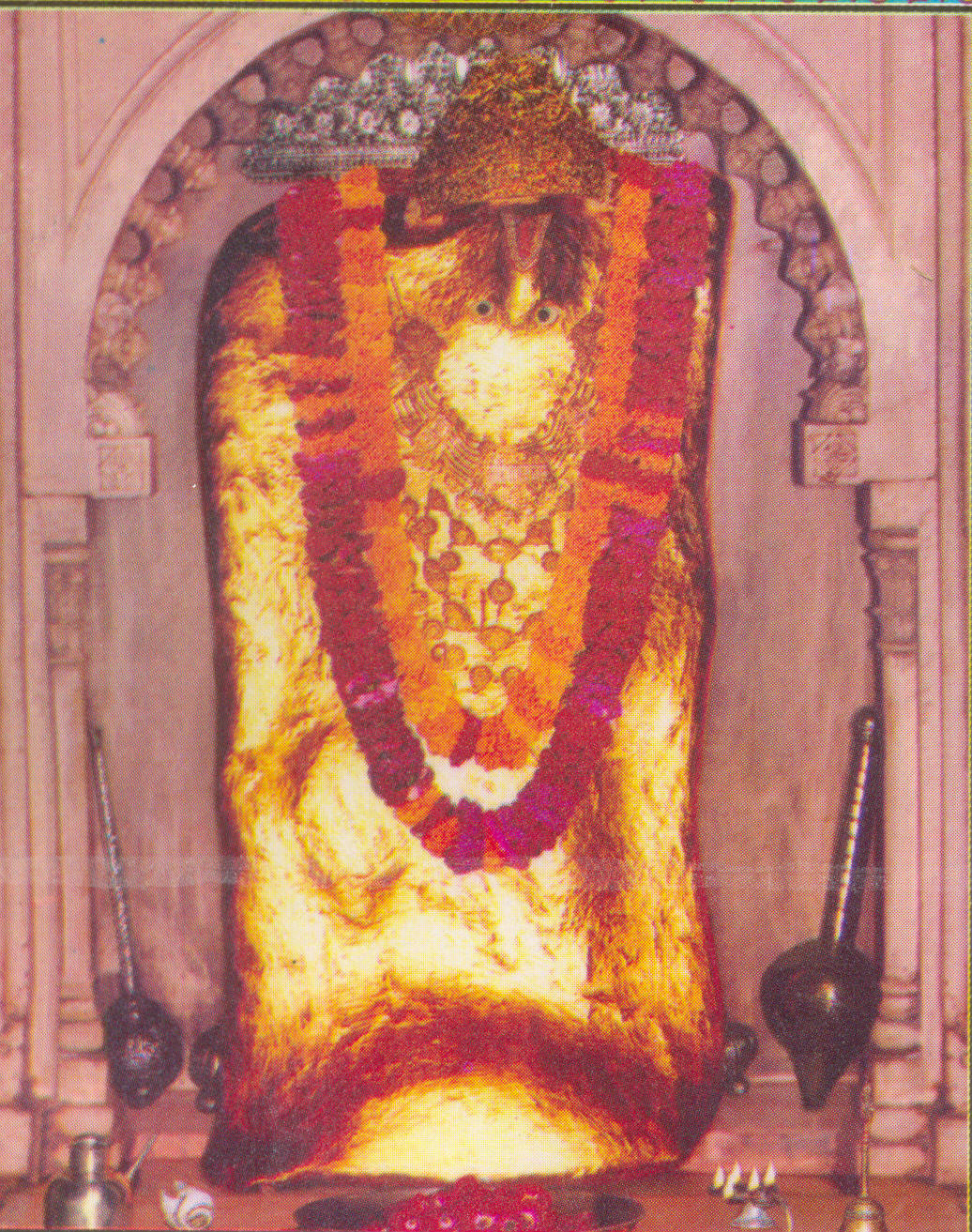
Mahendipur Balaji Ji Temple

- Paplaj Mata: The Temple of Paplaj Mata is situated in the sub-district Lalsot.

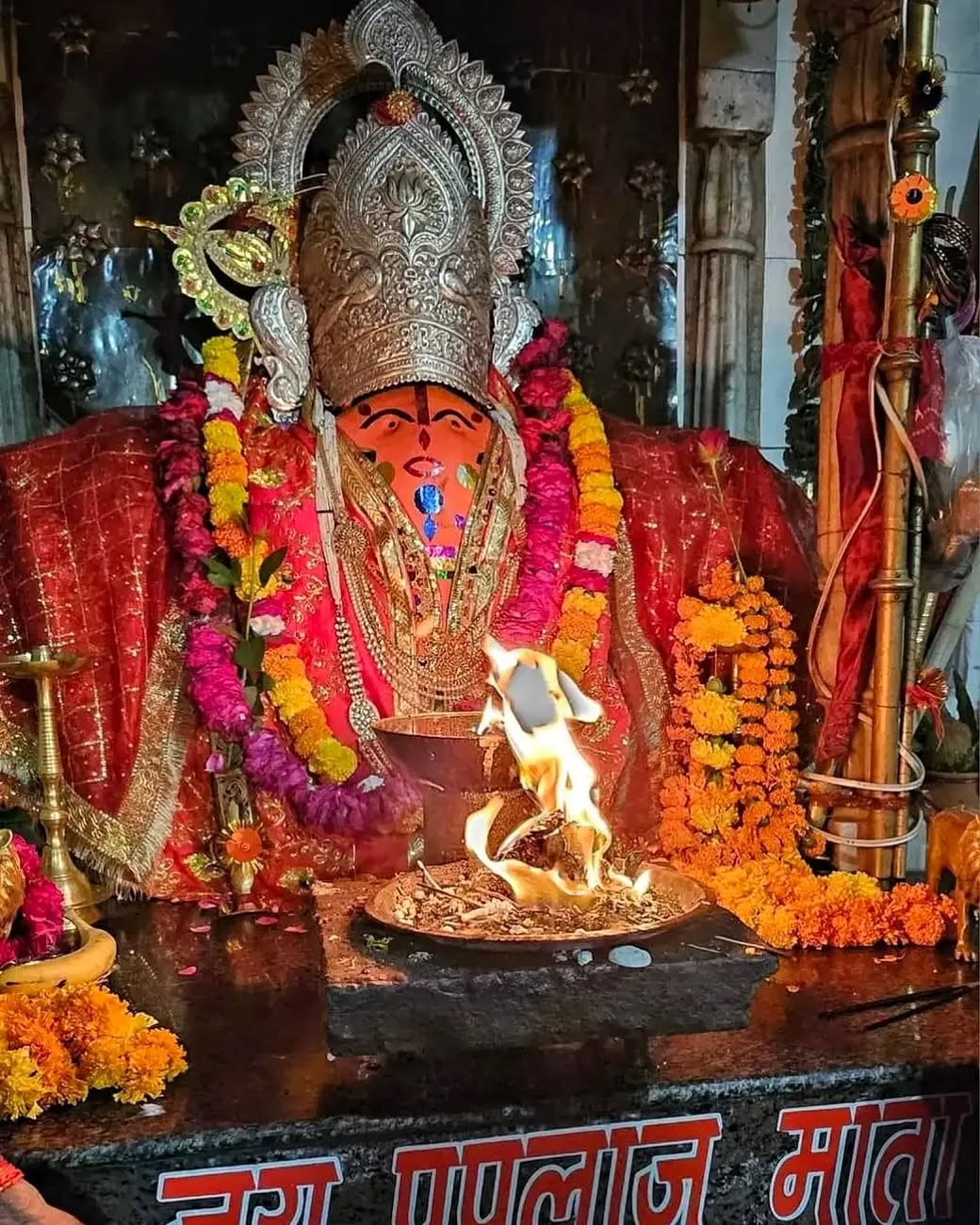
Paplaj Mata Temple

- Shri Binori Balaji Mandir: The Temple of Binori Balaji Ji is situated in the sub-district Lalsot.

== Transport ==
=== By road ===
Dausa is located on NH 21. It is 55 km from Jaipur and 180 km from Agra on NH-21 and 240 km from Delhi on Delhi–Mumbai Expressway and also well connected to other surrounding cities viz. Alwar, Karauli, Sawai Madhopur and Bharatpur by road. Further, NH-148 connects it to Lalsot. RSRTC operates bus service to major cities in Rajasthan, New Delhi and Uttar Pradesh.

=== By rail ===
The city is well connected by rail. It is on Delhi-Jaipur line. Dausa railway station is a very important railway station of North-Western Railway Zone under Jaipur division. A new railway line was added which connects Dausa to Gangapur City, after this the Dausa railway station became a railway junction and Bandikui Junction is also important Railway Station in Dausa District about 30 km from dausa city.

=== By air ===
The nearest airport to the city is Jaipur International Airport, which is at a distance of 60 km from the city. The second nearest airport is Agra Airport.
