= Pajawan =

Maharaja of Amber from 1070 to 1094

- Maharaja of Amber

5th Raja of Amber
- Reign: 22 March 1070 – 20 May 1094
- Predecessor: Raja Janddeo Kachwaha
- Successor: Raja Malesi Kachwaha
- Born: Amber, India
- Died: 20 May 1094
Names
- Maharaja Pajawan Rai Kacchwaha
- House: Kachhwaha
- Father: Raja Janddeo Kacchwaha
- Religion: Hinduism

Pajawan (died 20 May 1094), also known as Pajjun was the 5th ruler of the Kingdom of Amber. He belonged to the Kachhwaha Rajput clan which had migrated to Rajputana in the early 12th century. He was married to Prithviraj Chauhan's cousin and was a prominent and trusted general of Prithviraj. Pajawan fought 64 important battles in his military career.

== Reign ==
According to the Prithviraj Raso, Pajawan played a role in the battles at Hansi and Nagour, fighting alongside Prithviraj Chauhan, who subsequently appointed Pajawan the governor of Mahoba.

He also helped Prithviraj in defeating Bhimdev, a Solanki king of Gujarat.

In 1085, Raja Jaichand of Kannauj organised the Swayamvara of his daughter Sanyogita, inviting all the prominent kings and princes to the ceremony, but deliberately avoiding Prithviraj Chauhan. Furthermore, he placed an earthen statue of Prithviraj at the entrance of the venue, posing him as the doorman. Prithviraj got information about it. He arrived at Kannauj in disguise together with his trusted generals, one of which was Pajawan. When Sanyogita chose Prithviraj as her would-be husband by placing the garland on the statue of Prithviraj, he took her with him on a horse and escaped. The pursuing forces of Jaichand then engaged with Pajawan in a fierce battle.

== Death and succession ==
Pajawan fought for the victorious army in the First Battle of Tarain. However, he died soon after the battle. The poet Chand Bardai called him bravest of the allies of Chauhan. He was succeeded by his son Malesi Kacchwaha.

== Sources ==
- Jadunath Sarkar (1994). A History of Jaipur: C. 1503-1938. Orient Blackswan. ISBN 978-81-250-0333-5.
- Jadunath Sarkar (1960). Military History of India. Orient Longmans. ISBN 9780861251551.
