= List of state leaders in 16th-century South Asia =

This is a list of state leaders in the 16th century (1501–1600) AD, of South Asia. These polities are generally sovereign states, but excludes minor dependent territories, whose leaders can be found listed under territorial governors in the 16th century. For completeness, these lists can include colonies, protectorates, or other dependent territories that have since gained sovereignty.

== Bengal and Northeast India ==
- Ahom kingdom (complete list) –

- Suhungmung, King (1497–1539)
- Suklenmung, King (1539–1552)
- Sukhaamphaa, King (1552–1603)

- Baro-Bhuiyan –

- Isa Khan, Chief (1576–1599)
- Musa Khan, Chief (1599–1611)

- Bengal Sultanate: Hussain Shahi dynasty (complete list) –

- Alauddin Husain Shah, Sultan (1494–1519)
- Nasiruddin Nasrat Shah, Sultan (1519–1533)
- Alauddin Firuz Shah II, Sultan (1533)
- Ghiyasuddin Mahmud Shah, Sultan (1533–1538)

- Bengal Sultanate: Muhammad Shah dynasty (complete list) –

- Muhammad Khan Sur, Sultan (1554–1555)
- Ghiyasuddin Bahadur Shah II, Sultan (1555–1561)
- Ghiyasuddin Jalal Shah, Sultan (1561–1563)
- Ghiyasuddin Shah III, Sultan (1563–1564)

- Bengal Sultanate: Karrani dynasty (complete list) –

- Taj Khan Karrani, Sultan (1564–1566)
- Sulaiman Khan Karrani, Sultan (1566–1572)
- Bayazid Khan Karrani, Sultan (1572)
- Daud Khan Karrani, Sultan (1572–1576)

- Bhurshut (complete list) –

- Maharaja Rudranarayan, Maharaja (16th century)
- Bhavashankari, Maharaja (16th century)

- Chutia Kingdom (complete list) –

- Purnadhabnarayan, King (1480–1502)
- Dharmadhajpal, King (1502–1522)
- Nitypal, King (1522–1524)

- Jaintia Kingdom –

- Prabhat Roy, King (1500–1516)
- Majha Gosain, King (1516–1532)
- Burha Parbat Ray, King (1532–1548)
- Bar Gosain, King (1548–1564)
- Bijay Manik, King (1564–1580)
- Pratap Ray, King (1580–1596)
- Dhan Manik, King (1596–1612)

- Kamata Kingdom: Koch dynasty (complete list) –

- Biswa Singha, King (1515–1540)
- Nara Narayan, King (1540–1586)

- Langah Sultanate –

- Husseyn Langah I, Sultan (1456–1502)
- Mahmud Langah, Sultan (1502–?)

- Mallabhum (complete list) –

- Chandra Malla, King (1460–1501)
- Bir Malla, King (1501–1554)
- Dhari Malla, King (1554–1565)
- Bir Hambir, King (1565–1620)

- Kingdom of Manipur (complete list) –

- Senpi Kiyampa, King (1467–1508)
- Koilempa, King (1508–1512)
- Lamkhyampa, King (1512–1523)
- Nonginphapa, King (1523–1524)
- Kapompa, King (1524–1542)
- Tangchampa, King (1542–1545)
- Chalampa, King (1545–1562)
- Mungyampa, King (1562–1597)
- Khaki Ngampa, King (1597–1652)

- Twipra Kingdom –

- Dhanya Manikya, King (1463–1515)

== India ==
- Ahmadnagar Sultanate: Nizam Shahi dynasty of the Deccan (complete list) –

- Ahmad Nizam Shah I, Sultan (1490–1510)
- Burhan Nizam Shah I, Sultan (1510–1553)
- Hussain Nizam Shah I, Sultan (1553–1565)
- Murtaza Nizam Shah I, Sultan (1565–1588)
- Hussain Nizam Shah II, Sultan (1588–1589)
- Ismail Nizam Shah, Sultan (1589–1591)
- Burhan Nizam Shah II, Sultan (1591–1595)
- Chand Bibi, Sultan (1595–1596)
- Ahmad Nizam Shah II, Sultan (1596)
- Bahadur Nizam Shah, Sultan (1596–1600)
- Murtaza Nizam Shah II, Sultan (1600–1610)

- Amber Kingdom (complete list) –

- Chandrasen, King (1467–1503)
- Prithviraj Singh I, King (1503–1527)
- Puranmal, King (1527–1534)
- Bhim Singh, King (1534–1537)
- Ratan Singh, King (1537–1548)
- Askaran, King (1548–1548)
- Bharmal, King (1548–1574)
- Bhagwant Das, King (1574–1589)
- Man Singh, King (1589–1614)

- Arakkal kingdom (complete list) –

- Ali, Raja (1545–1591)
- Abubakar I, Raja (1591–1607)

- Bahmani Sultanate (complete list) –

- Mahmood Shah Bahmani II(1482–1518)
- Ahmad Shah IV, Sultan (1518–1521)
- Ala ud din Shah, Sultan (1521–1522)
- Waliullah Shah, Sultan (1522–1524)
- Kalimullah Shah, Sultan (1524–1527)

- Berar Sultanate of the Deccan (complete list) –

- Fathullah Imad-ul-Mulk, Sultan (1490–1504)
- Aladdin Imad Shah, Sultan (1504–1530)
- Darya Imad Shah, Sultan (1530–1562)
- Burhan Imad Shah, Sultan (1562–1574)
- Tufal Khan, Sultan (1574)

- Bidar Sultanate of the Deccan (complete list) –

- Qasim Barid I, Prime Minister (1489–1504)
- Amir Barid I, Prime Minister (1504–1542)
- Ali Barid Shah I, Sultan (1542–1580)
- Ibrahim Barid Shah, Sultan (1580–1587)
- Qasim Barid Shah II, Sultan (1587–1591)
- Ali Barid Shah II, Sultan (1591)
- Amir Barid Shah II, Sultan (1591–1601)

- Bijapur Sultanate: Adil Shahi dynasty of the Deccan (complete list) –

- Yusuf Adil Shah, Sultan (1490–1511)
- Ismail Adil Shah, Sultan (1511–1534)
- Mallu Adil Shah, Sultan (1534)
- Ibrahim Adil Shah I, Sultan (1534–1558)
- Ali Adil Shah I, Sultan (1558–1579)
- Ibrahim Adil Shah II, Sultan (1580–1627)

- Bikaner

- Kings (complete list) –

- Bika, Rao (1465–1504)
- Nar Singh (Naro), Rao (1504–1505)
- Lunkaran, Rao (1505–1526)
- Jait Singh, Rao (1526–1542)
- Kalyan Mal, suzerain Rao (1542–1571)
- Rai Singh I, Rao (1571–1612)

- Dewans (complete list) –

- Bachhraj / Bika, Dewan (1465–1505)
- Karam Singh Bachhawat/ Rao Nar Singh and Rao Lunkaran, Dewan (1504–1526)
- Var Singh Bachhawat / Jait Singh, Dewan (1526–1535)
- Nagraj Bachhawat / Jait Singh and Rao Kalyan Mal, Dewan (1535–1542)
- Sangram Singh Bachhawat / Kalyan Mal, Dewan (1542–1571)
- Karam Chand Bachhawat/ Kalyan Mal and Rai Singh, Dewan (1571–1591)

- Bundi (complete list) –

- Surjan Singh, Rao Raja (1554–1585)
- Bhoj Singh, Rao Raja (1585–1608)

- Kingdom of Cochin (complete list) –

- Unniraman Koyikal I, Maharaja (c.1500–1503)
- Unniraman Koyikal II, Maharaja (1503–1537)
- Veera Kerala Varma, Maharaja (1537–1565)
- Keshava Rama Varma, Maharaja (1565–1601)

- Kingdom of Coorg (complete list) –

- Vira Raja, Raja (late 16th century)
- Appaji Raja, Raja (16th-17th century)

- Delhi Sultanate: Lodi dynasty (complete list) –

- Sikandar Lodi, Sultan (1489–1517)
- Ibrahim Lodi, Sultan (1517–1526)

succeeded by the Mughal Empire

- Dhrol (complete list) –

- Hardholji, Thakur Sahib (1595–?)
- Jasoji Hardolji, Thakur Sahib (16th-17th century)

- Dungarpur (complete list) –

- Udai Singh, Maharawal (1497–1527)
- Prithviraj, Maharawal (1527–1549)
- Askaran, Maharawal (1549–1580)
- Sesmal, Maharawal (1580–1606)

- Farooqui dynasty (complete list) –

- Daud Khan, Sultan (1501–1508)
- Ghazni Khan, Sultan (1508)
- Alam Khan, Sultan (1508–1509)
- Adil Khan III, Sultan (1509–1520)
- Miran Muhammad Shah I, Sultan (1520–1537)
- Miran Mubarak Shah, Sultan (1537–1566)
- Miran Muhammad Shah II, Sultan (1566–1576)
- Hasan Khan, Sultan (1576)
- Ali Khan, Sultan (1576–1597)
- Bahadur Shah, Sultan (1597–1601)

- Gajapati Kingdom (complete list) –

- Prataparudra Deva, King (1497–1540)
- Kalua Deva, King (1540–1541)
- Kakharua Deva, King (1541)

- Garhwal Kingdom (complete list) –

- Man Shah, King (1498–1518)
- Shyam Shah, King (1518–1527)
- Mahipat Shah, King (1527–1552)
- Prithvi Shah, King (1552–1614)

- Gujarat Sultanate (complete list) –

- Mahmud Begada, Sultan (1458–1511)
- Muzaffar Shah II, Sultan (1511–1526)
- Sikandar Shah, Sultan (1526)
- Mahmud Shah II, Sultan (1526)
- Bahadur Shah, Sultan (1526–1535, 1536–1537)
- Miran Muhammad Shah I of the Farooqi dynasty, Sultan (1537)
- Mahmud Shah III, Sultan (1537–1554)
- Ahmad Shah III, Sultan (1554–1561)
- Muzaffar Shah III, Sultan (1561–1573, 1584)

- Jaisalmer (complete list) –

- Jaitsi Singh II, Rawal (1497–1530)
- Karan Singh II, Rawal (1530)
- Lunkaran Singh, Rawal (1530–1551)
- Maldev Singh, Rawal (1551–1562)
- Harraj Singh, Rawal (1562–1578)
- Bhim Singh, Rawal (1578–1624)

- Jawhar (complete list) –

- Krishnashah I Krishnarao Mukne, Raja (1490–16th century)
- Nemshah II Krishnashah Mukne, Raja (?–1600)

- Jhabua (complete list) –

- Kesho Das, Raja (1584–1607)

- Jodhpur (complete list) –

- Suja, Rao (1492–1515)
- Biram Singh, Rao (1515–1515)
- Ganga Rathore, Rao (1515–1532)
- Maldeo Rathore, Rao (1532–1562)
- Chandra Sen, Rao (1562–1581)
- Udai Singh of Marwar, Raja (1583–1595)
- Sur Singh, Sawai Raja (1595–1619)

- Kahlur (complete list) –

- Ram Chand, Raja (15th–16th century)
- Uttam Chand, Raja (16th century)
- Gyan Chand, Raja (1518–1555)
- Bikram Chand, Raja (1555–1593)
- Sultan Chand, Raja (1593–1600)
- Kalyan Chand, Raja (1600–1636)

- Kumaon Kingdom: Chand (complete list) –

- Kirti Chand, King (1488–1503)
- Pratap Chand, King (1503–1517)
- Tara Chand, King (1517–1533)
- Manik Chand, King (1533–1542)
- Kalyan Chand III, King (1542–1551)
- Purna Chand, King (1551–1555)
- Bhishma Chand, King (1555–1560)
- Balo Kalyan Chand, King (1560–1568)
- Rudra Chand, King (1568–1597)
- Lakshmi Chand, King (1597–1621)

- Kingdom of Kutch (complete list) –

- Hamirji, King (1472–?)
- Jam Raval, King (1524–?)
- Khengarji I, King (1548–?)
- Bharmalji I, King (1585–?)

- Madurai Nayak dynasty (complete list) –

- Viswanatha Nayak, King (1529–1563)
- Kumara Krishnappa Nayak, King (1563–1573)
- joint rulers group I, King (1573–1595)
- joint rulers group II, King (1595–1602)

- Malwa Sultanate (complete list) –

- Nasir-ud-Din Shah, Sultan (1500–1510)
- Shihab-ud-Din Mahmud Shah II, Sultan (1510–1531)
- Bahadur Shah, Sultan (1531–1537)
- Shuja’at Khan, Wali (1537–1542)
- Isa Khan, Wali (1542–1545)
- Shuja’at Khan, Wali (1545–1552)
- Baz Bahadur, Sultan (1555–1561/62)

- Mandi (complete list) –

- Chhatar Sen, Raja (1534–1554)
- Sahib Sen, Raja (1554–1575 or 1534–1554)
- Narain Sen, Raja (1575–1595 or 1554–1574)
- Keshab Sen, Raja (1595–1616 or 1574–1604)

- Mughal Empire (complete list) –

- Zahir ud din Muhammad Babur, Emperor (1526–1530)
- Nasir ud din Muhammad Humayun, Emperor (1530–1540)
- Jalal ud din Muhammad Akbar (Akbar the Great), Emperor (1556–1605)

- Kingdom of Mysore (complete list) –

- Timmaraja Wodeyar II, vassal Maharaja (1553–1565), independent Maharaja (1565–1572)
- Chamaraja Wodeyar IV, Maharaja (1572–1576)
- Chamaraja Wodeyar V, Maharaja (1576–1578)
- Raja Wodeyar I, Maharaja (1578–1617)

- Nawanagar (complete list) –

- Rawalji Lakhaji, Jam Saheb (1540–1562)
- Vibhaji Rawalji, Jam Saheb (1562–1569)
- Sataji Vibhaji, Jam Saheb (1569–1608)

- Nayakas of Chitradurga (complete list) –

- Obanna Nayaka I, Chief (1588–1602)

- Nayakas of Keladi (complete list) –

- Sadashiva Nayaka, Raja (1530–1566)
- Sankanna Nayaka, Raja (1566–1570)
- Chikka Sankanna Nayaka, Raja (1570–1580)
- Rama Raja Nayaka, Raja (1580–1586)
- Hiriya Venkatappa Nayaka, Raja (1586–1629)

- Orchha (complete list) –

- Rudra Pratap Singh, Raja (1501–1531)
- Bharatichand, Raja (1531–1554)
- Madhukar Shah, Raja (1554–1592)
- Ram Shah, Raja (1592–1605)

- Golconda Sultanate: Qutb Shahi dynasty of the Deccan (complete list) –

- Sultan Quli Qutbl Mulk, Sultan (1518–1543)
- Jamsheed Quli Qutb Shah, Sultan (1543–1550)
- Subhan Quli Qutb Shah, Sultan (1550)
- Ibrahim Quli Qutub Shah, Sultan (1550–1580)
- Muhammad Quli Qutb Shah, Sultan (1580–1612)

- Rajpipla (complete list) –

- Bhimdev, Maharana (1463–c.1526)
- Raisinhji, Maharana (1526–c.1543)
- Karanbaji, Maharana (1543–?)
- Abhayraj Ji, Maharana (16th century)
- Sujansinhji, Maharana (16th century)
- Bhairavsinhji, Maharana (16th century)
- Pruthuraj Ji, Maharana (1583–1593)
- Deepsinhji, Maharana (1593–?)

- Bandhogarh (complete list) –

- Shaktivan Deo, Maharaja (1495–1500)
- Veer Singh Deo, Maharaj (1500–1540)
- Virbhan Singh, Maharaja (1540–1555)
- Ramchandra Singh, Maharaja (1555–1592)
- Duryodhan Singh, Maharaja (1593–1618)

- Sur Empire (complete list) –

- Sher Shah Suri, Padishah (1532–1545)
- Islam Shah Suri, Padishah (1545–1554)
- Firuz Shah Suri, Padishah (1554)
- Muhammad Adil Shah, Padishah (1554–1555)
- Ibrahim Shah Suri, Padishah (1555)
- Sikandar Shah Suri, Padishah (1555)
- Adil Shah Suri, Padishah (1555–1556)

- Thanjavur Nayak kingdom (complete list) –

- Chevvappa Nayak, King (1532–1580)
- Achuthappa Nayak, King (1560–1614)
- Raghunatha Nayak, King (1600–1634)

- Tripura: Manikya dynasty (complete list) –

- Dhanya Manikya, Maharaja (1490–1515)
- Dhwaja Manikya, Maharaja (1515–1520)
- Deva Manikya, Maharaja (1520–1530)
- Indra Manikya I, Maharaja (1530–1532)
- Vijaya Manikya II, Maharaja (1532–1563)
- Ananta Manikya, Maharaja (1563–1567)
- Udai Manikya, Maharaja (1567–1573)
- Joy Manikya I, Maharaja (1573–1577)
- Amar Manikya, Maharaja (1577–1585)
- Rajdhar Manikya I, Maharaja (1586–1600)
- Ishwar Manikya, Maharaja (1600)
- Yashodhar Manikya, Maharaja (1600–1623)

- Udaipur (complete list) –

- Rai Mal, Maharana (1473–1509)
- Sangram Singh I, Maharana (1509–1528)
- Ratan Singh II, Maharana (1528–1531)
- Vikramaditya Singh, Maharana (1531–1537)
- Vanvir Singh, Maharana (1537–1540)
- Udai Singh II, Maharana (1540–1568)
- Udai Singh II, Maharana (1568–1572)
- Pratap Singh I, Maharana (1572–1597)
- Amar Singh I, Maharana (1597–1620)

- Venad (complete list) –

- Vira Ravi Ravi Varma, King (1484–1503)
- Martanda Varma, Kulasekhara Perumal, King (1503–1504)
- Vira Ravi Kerala Varma, Kulasekhara Perumal, King (1504–1528)

- Vijayanagara Empire: Tuluva dynasty (complete list) –

- Tuluva Narasa Nayaka, King (1491–1503)
- Viranarasimha Raya, King (1503–1509)
- Krishnadevaraya, King (1509–1529)
- Achyuta Deva Raya, King (1529–1542)
- Venkata I, King (1542)
- Sadasiva Raya, puppet ruler (1542–1570)

- Vijayanagara Empire: Araveeti dynasty (complete list) –

- Aliya Rama Raya, Regent (1542–1565)
- Tirumala Deva Raya, King (1565–1572)
- Sriranga I, King (1572–1586)
- Venkata II, King (1586–1614)

- Zamorin of Calicut (complete list) –

- Mana Vikrama III, Samoothiri (c.1571)

== Maldives ==
- Sultanate of the Maldives: Hilaaly dynasty (complete list) –

- Hassan VII, Sultan (1510–1511)
- Sharif Ahmed, Sultan (1511–1513)
- Ali III, Sultan (1513)
- Kalu Mohamed, Sultan (1513–1529)
- Hassan VIII, Sultan (1529–1549)
- Mohamed III, Sultan (1549–1551)
- Hassan IX, Sultan (1551–1552)
- Aboobakuru II, Sultan (1554–1557)
- Ali IV, Sultan (1557–1558)
- Dom Manoel, King (1558–1573)
- Dom Manoel, King (1573–1583)
- Dom João, King (1583–1603)

== Nepal ==
- Gorkha Kingdom –

- Dravya Shah, King (1559–1570)
- Purna Shah, King (1570–1605)
- Ganesh Pande, Kaji (1559–1606)

- Malla rulers of Kantipur (complete list) –

- Ratna Malla, Raja (1482–1520)
- Surya Malla, Raja (1520–1530)
- Amara Malla, Raja (1530–1538)
- Narendra Malla, Raja (1538–1560)
- Mahendra Malla, Raja (1560–1574)
- Sadashiva Malla, Raja (1574–1583)
- Shivasimha Malla, Raja (1583–1620)

- Malla rulers of Lalitpur (complete list) –

- Purandara Simha, Raja (c.1580–1600)
- Harihara Simha, Raja (c.1600–1609)

== Pakistan ==
- Khanate of Kalat (complete list) –

- Bijar Khan Mirwani, Wali (1512–1530)
- Zagar Khan Mirwani, Wali (1530–1535)
- Ibrahim Khan Qambrani, Wali (1535–1547)
- Gwahram Khan Qambrani, Wali (1547–1549)
- Hassan Khan Qambrani, Wali (1549–1569)
- Sanjar Khan Qambrani, Wali (1569–1581)
- Malook Khan Qambrani, Wali (1581–1590)
- Qambar Sani Khan Qambrani, Wali (1590–1601)

- Samma dynasty (complete list) –

- Nizamuddin II, Jam (1461–1508)
- Jam Feruzudin, Jam (1508–1527)

- Langah Sultanate –

- Sultan Mahmud I (1498–1518)
- Sultan Husseyn II (1518–1526)
- Sultan Mahmud Langah II (1526-1540)

- Chitral (princely state): Raees Dynasty

- Shah Akber Raees (1491-1520)
- Shah Tahir Raees (1520-1531)
- Shah Nasir Raees (1531-1574)
- Shah Mehmood Raees (1574-1590)

- Maqpon dynasty

- 1490-1515 Bo Kha
- 1515-1540 Sher Shah
- 1540-1565 Ali Khan
- 1565-1590 Ghazi Mir
- 1580-1624 Ali Sher Khan Anchan

== Sri Lanka ==
- Jaffna Kingdom (complete list) –

- Singai Pararasasegaram, King (1478–1519)
- Cankili I, King (1519–1561)
- Puviraja Pandaram, King (1561–1565)
- Periyapillai, King (1565–1582)
- Kasi Nayinar Pararacacekaran, King (1565–1570)
- Puviraja Pandaram, King (1582–1591)
- Ethirimana Cinkam, King (1591–1616)

- Kingdom of Kandy (complete list) –

- Sena Sammatha Wickramabahu, King (1473–1511)
- Jayaweera Astana, King (1511–1551)
- Karaliyadde Bandara, King (1551–1581)
- Dona Catherina, Queen (1581)
- Rajasinha I, King (1581–1591)
- Vimaladharmasuriya I, King (1590–1604)

- Kingdom of Kotte (complete list) –

- Parakramabahu VIII, King (1484–1518)
- Dharma Parakramabahu IX, King (1509–1528)
- Vijayabahu VII, King (1509–1521)
- Bhuvanekabahu VII, King (1521–1551)
- Dharmapala, King (1551–1597)

- Portuguese Ceylon (complete list) –

Colony, 1505–1658
For details see the Kingdom of Portugal under Southwest Europe

- Kingdom of Sitawaka (complete list) –

- Mayadunne, King (1521–1581)
- Rajasinha I, King (1581–1593)
