= Askaran =

Raja of Amber in 1548 and Narwar until 1599

- Raja of Amber; Raja of Narwar

Raja of Amber
- Reign: 15 May – 1 June 1548
- Predecessor: Ratan Singh
- Successor: Bharmal

Raja of Narwar
- Reign: ? – c.1599
- Successor: Raj Singh
- Died: c.1599
- Spouse: Indravati of Marwar
- Issue: Goverdhan; Raj Singh; Manrang Devi
- Dynasty: Kachhwaha
- Father: Bhim Singh

Raja Askaran (died c. 1599) was a late sixteenth-century Kachwaha Rajput ruler. Though briefly Raja of Amber, for the majority of his life Askaran was the ruler of Narwar. He also had a distinguished career as a military officer under the Mughal emperor Akbar and rose high in his service.

Through his maternal granddaughter Jagat Gosain, he was the great-grandfather of the Mughal emperor Shah Jahan.

== Background ==
Askaran was born a younger son of Bhim Singh, Raja of Amber. His paternal grandparents were Raja Prithviraj Singh I and his wife Bala Bai, a daughter of Rao Lunkaran of Bikaner.

Following the death of Bhim Singh in 1537, the throne of Amber passed to Askaran's elder brother Ratan Singh. One source alleges that Askaran had a hand in his father's death and later went on a pilgrimage to absolve himself of the crime. However, historian Jadunath Sarkar considers this claim of patricide to be unlikely, given that this pilgrimage took place over a decade after Bhim Singh's death. The fact that the source for this information is anonymous and undated further detracts from its credibility.

== Rule of Amber and granting of Narwar ==
What is more certain is that Askaran had ordered the assassination of his brother Ratan Singh in 1548, instigated by nobles who had been insulted by the latter. But after a reign of only 16 days, Askaran himself was overthrown at the hands of the nobility, the crown instead passing to his paternal uncle Bharmal. Haji Khan, the Mughal governor of Alwar and Mewat, was later able to arrange a reconciliation between Askaran and Bharmal. Further to this, the displaced raja was also recommended to the Mughal emperor Akbar to be granted the rule of Narwar in compensation for his lost kingdom. (Note: Narwar was believed to be the ancient seat of the Kachwahas, with its granting to Askaran being seen as the confirmation of their claim.) Narwar remained with Askaran's descendants from then on as a principality independent from the Rajas of Amber.

== Under Mughal service ==
In 1562, Askaran supported Bharmal when Suja, the son of his other uncle Puranmal, attempted to make a claim for the throne. Later, when Bharmal became a favourite of Akbar, Askaran's own relations with the Emperor rose due to his kinship and close ties with the former. He subsequently joined the Imperial service, coming into the limelight in 1577, when Akbar ordered an expedition against Madhukar Shah Bundela of Orchha. Askaran was given a responsible post on this campaign and upon its success he, alongside the chief commander Sadiq Khan, brought their defeated foe to submit to Akbar at Bhera on 15 May 1578. From there, he accompanied Akbar to the Mughal capital at Fatehpur Sikri and remained with him at Court.

The following year, Askaran was among the senior officers who were dispatched to quell an army rebellion in Bihar. He remained in the east, fighting alongside Todar Mal in military campaigns and returning with him to re-join Akbar in Punjab in 1581. Amid administrative reforms in 1583, Askaran was appointed to a committee tasked with overseeing inheritance regarding property. In March 1585, he was awarded the rank of 1000 zat and directed to assist Mirza Aziz Koka in the governorship of Malwa. On 20 December of that year, he was among the able commanders who joined Zain Khan Koka in a campaign against the Yusufzais. In December 1586, he, alongside Sheikh Ibrahim, were appointed joint governors of Agra. Later, having reached a fairly advanced age, Askaran was retired from active military service and remained at Court. In 1593, the Emperor visited him to condole the death of his son Goverdhan, who was killed in a family feud.

He died in c.1599 while serving as governor of Gwalior Fort. He was succeeded in both this position and as Raja of Narwar by his son Raj Singh.

== Family ==
Askaran was married to Indravati, a daughter of Rao Maldev of Marwar. He had at least two sons; Goverdhan, who predeceased him, and Raj Singh, who was his successor. His daughter Manrang Devi married Raja Udai Singh, the ruler of Marwar (present-day Jodhpur); through their daughter Jagat Gosain, they were the maternal grandparents of the Mughal emperor Shah Jahan.
