= Bharmal =

Raja of Amber from 1548 to 1574

Raja Bharmal
- 23rd Raja of Amber
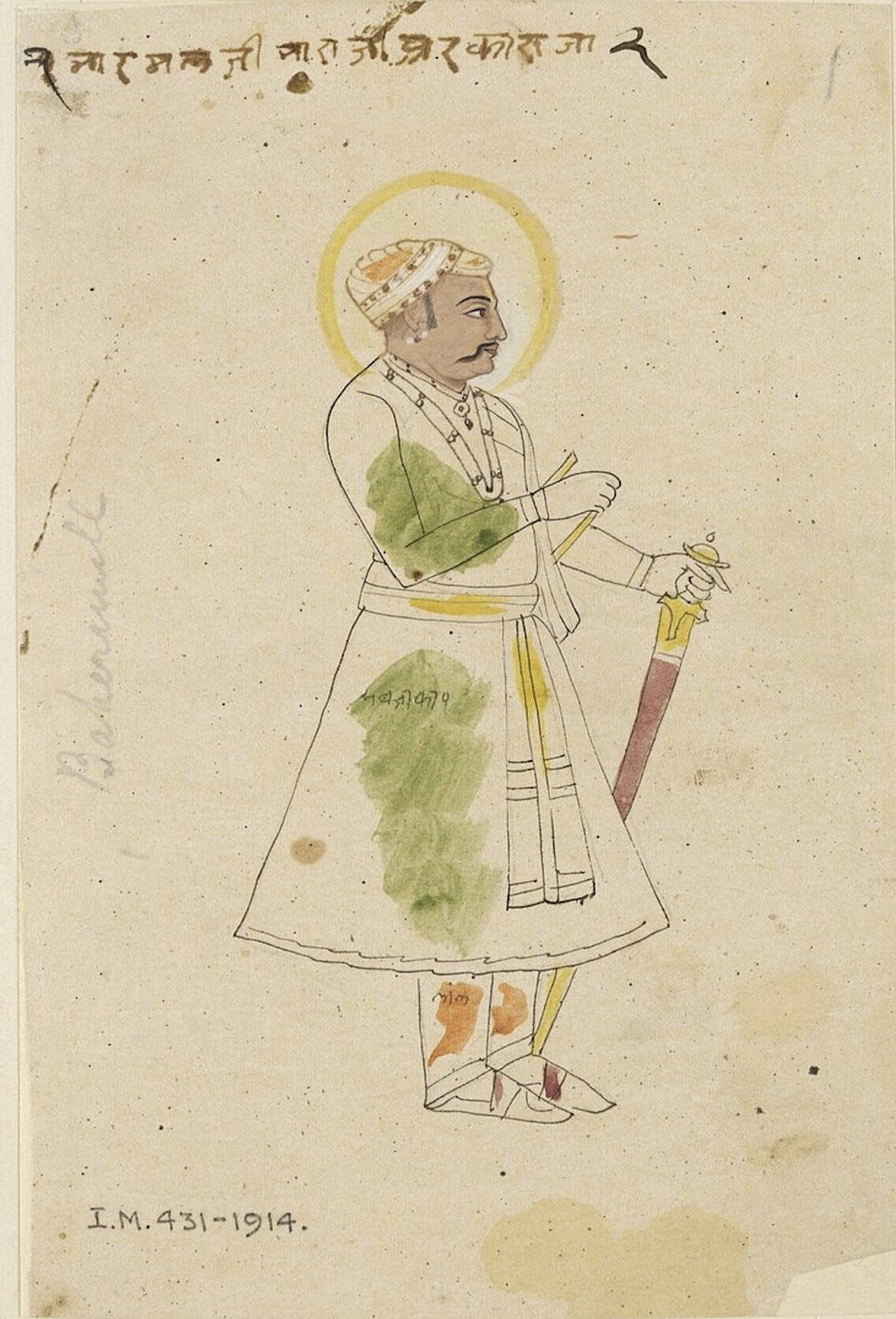
- 19th century sketch of Raja Bharmal

23rd Kachhwaha Raja of Amber
- Reign: 1 June 1548 – 27 January 1574
- Coronation: 1 June 1548
- Predecessor: Askaran
- Successor: Bhagwant Das
- Born: c. 1498; Amer, Kingdom of Amber, Rajputana
- Died: 27 January 1574 (aged 75-76); Agra, Agra Subah, Mughal Empire
- Wives: Rathorji Badan Deiji of Marwar; Solankiniji Lakham Deiji of Toda Todi; Champavati Solanki
- Issue more...: Bhagwant Das; Mariam-uz-Zamani; Kishanawati Bai; Kunwar Bhopat; Jagannath Singh
- House: Kachhwaha
- Father: Prithviraj Singh I
- Mother: Rathorji Apurav Deiji Baal Deiji, daughter of Rao Lunkaran of Bikaner
- Religion: Hinduism

Raja Bharmal, also known as Bihari Mal, and Bihar Mal (1498 – 27 January 1574), was the 23rd ruler of Amber, which was later known as Jaipur. He was a ruler of the Kachhwaha clan.

His daughter, Mariam-uz-Zamani was the chief consort of the third Mughal Emperor, Akbar and mother of the fourth Mughal Emperor Jahangir. His daughter's marriage to Akbar was a significant event of the Mughal Empire. He along with his successor, Bhagwant Das and his grandson, Man Singh I became the highest mansabdar of their times. He died in Agra in the year 1574, and was succeeded by his eldest son, Raja Bhagwant Das.

== Family and accession ==
Bharmal was the fourth son of Raja Prithviraj Singh I of Amer and Rani Apoorva Devi, also known as Bala Bai, a princess of the Rathore clan and daughter of Rao Lunkaran of the royal family of Bikaner.

Following Prithviraj's death in 1527, his eldest son by Queen Tanwar, Raja Puranmal, succeeded to the throne. He was killed at the Battle of Mandrail on 19 January 1534 while assisting the Mughal emperor Humayun in recapturing the fort of Bayana. His son, Sujamal, was still a minor and therefore unable to succeed him.

The throne instead passed to Puranmal's younger brother Bhim Singh, the next eldest son of Rani Apoorva Devi. Sujamal subsequently sought refuge with the Tanwar royal family. After Bhim Singh's death, his eldest son Ratan Singh became ruler. He was later killed by his half-brother Askaran, who briefly seized the throne before being deposed by the nobles of Amer. On 1 June 1548, Bharmal, then about fifty years old, was chosen as the new ruler of Amer.

Bharmal had at least thirteen sons, including his successor Bhagwant Das, and at least four daughters, among them Mariam-uz-Zamani, empress consort of Emperor Akbar, and Kishanawati, wife of Haji Khan Pathan.

== Reign ==
=== Context of early reign ===
When Bharmal's eldest brother Puranmal succeeded the throne in 1527, the political scenario was very uncertain. The Rajput confederacy led by Rana Sanga suffered a great loss in the battle of Khanua. The Mughal power was not firmly established in India. There were other Muslim rulers, who were gaining the power to oust Humayun, the son of Babur out of India. Bahadur Shah of Gujarat and Sher Khan (later Sher Shah Suri) were prominent among them.

Bahadur Shah was pursuing a policy of expansion. He helped and sent Tatar Khan Lodi to occupy the fort of Bayana. He occupied the fort of Bayana which was under Mughal occupation since the time of Babur. Humayun sent his brothers Askari Mirza and Hindal Mirza to recapture the fort. Puranmal, then Raja of Amer, fought in the battle called the Battle of Mandrail in favor of the Mughals in 1534.

=== Akbar and Bharmal ===
In 1556, Bharmal helped Majnun Khan Qaqshal, a Mughal commandant, which Majnun Khan later narrated to Akbar. Akbar subsequently invited Bharmal to the court of Delhi and honored him, his sons, and other relatives by giving a robe of honor. At this time, while Akbar was trying to tame a wild elephant, the intoxicated elephant ran towards people which led to a commotion while they were trying to escape, however when the elephant approached the ground of Rajput nobles, they stood their ground by loyalty. This act of Amer nobles impressed the Emperor who then enquired about the Raja Bharmal and pleased with his valor said, "We will rear you".

In 1562, the situation became critical for the Kachhwahas when Mirza Muhammad Sharaf-ud-din Hussain was appointed Mughal governor of Mewat. Sujamal reached his court and received his support for winning the throne of Amer. Mirza led a large army to Amber and Bharmal was in no position to resist. He forced the Kachhwahas to leave Amber and live in forests and hills. Bharmal promised a fixed tribute to Mirza and handed over his son, Jagannath, and his nephews, Raj Singh (son of Askaran) and Khangar Singh (son of Jagmal), as hostages for its due payment.

When Sharaf-ud-din was preparing to invade Amber again, Bharmal met Akbar's courtier, Chaghtai Khan. Luckily for the Raja of Amer, Akbar was at Karavali (a village near Agra) on his way from Agra to Ajmer (on a pilgrimage to the dargah of Khwaja Moinuddin Chisti), Chaghtai Khan pleaded on behalf of Bharmal for his protection, which he agreed and summoned the Raja to his court. Accordingly, the latter's brother, Rupsi Bairagi, and his son, Jaimal, met Akbar at Dausa and Bharmal himself met Akbar at his camp at Sanganer on 20 January 1562.

Chaghtai Khan introduced Bharmal and his relatives, who proposed to give his eldest daughter, Hira Kunwari, in marriage to Akbar. Akbar consented and ordered Chaghtai Khan to make the necessary arrangements. Upon Akbar's arrival in Sambhar on his return journey from Ajmer, Mirza surrendered his hostages Jagannath, Raj Singh, and Khangar to Akbar. Bharmal also reached Sambhar and on 6 February 1562, his daughter Mariam-uz-Zamani was married to Akbar.

On 10 February 1562 Akbar's new Kachhwaha relatives again came to his camp at Ratanpura to take formal leave from him. Here, Man Singh was presented to him. From there, Bhagwant Das, Man Singh and a number of their relatives accompanied Akbar to Agra.

After this marriage, he was immediately made the commander of 5000 cavalry units, the highest rank possible for a noble in the Mughal court. He was in the words of Nizamuddin Ahmad, one of the renowned Rajas of Hindustan who came into service of the Emperor with great favors and royal benefactions. He was distinguished among the Rajput clan for his valor and sincere devotion and loyalty and is regarded as one of Akbar's most loyal, courageous, and competent commanders and rose to great favor of the Emperor. Tarikh-i-Salim notes, 'In correctness, allegiance and courage he was truly outstanding amongst his people'. Abul Fazl in the praise of his family describes Amer kingdom as "having a fine genetic pool".

== Issue ==
Raja Bharmal had at least thirteen sons and four daughters:

- Raja Bhagwant Das (1527–1589)
- Kishanawati Bai, married Haji Khan of Mewat
- Kunwar Bhopat (Bhupat)
- Mariam-uz-Zamani (1542–1623), married Mughal emperor Akbar
- Raja Jagannath Singh (1552–1612)
- Sukanya of Dwangarh
- Kunwar Sudar (Sardul)
- Kunwar Lalhodi
- Kunwar Prathideep
- Roopchand Singh
- Kunwar Parasraam (Parshuram)
- four unknown sons and one unknown daughter

Raja Bharmal was succeeded by his eldest son, Raja Bhagwant Das, after his death.

== In popular culture ==
- 2013–2015: Jodha Akbar, broadcast on Zee TV, where he was played by Rajeev Saxena.
- Kulbhushan Kharbanda portrayed Raja Bharmal in the 2008 film Jodhaa Akbar directed by Ashutosh Gowarikar.

== Ancestry ==
Ancestors of Bharmal

8. Uddharan, Raja of Amber
4. Chandrasen, Raja of Amber
2. Prithviraj Singh I, Raja of Amber
1. Bharmal
12. Bika, Rao of Bikaner
6. Lunkaran, Rao of Bikaner
13. Rang Kanwar of Pugal
3. Apurva Devi (Bala Bai)
