= Bhagwant Das =

Raja of Amber from 1574 to 1589

- Raja of Amber; Governor of Lahore; Amir-ul-Umra
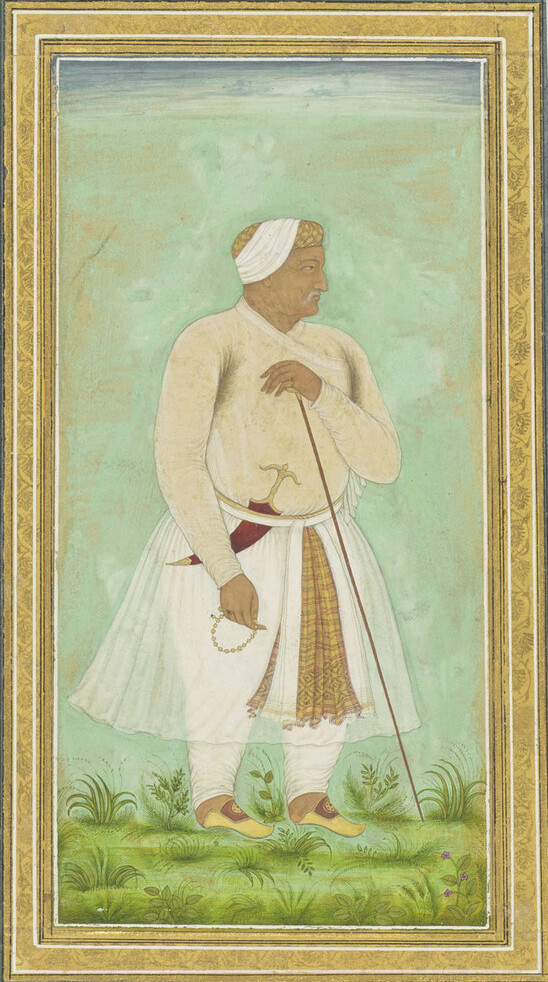
- Portrait of Raja Bhagvant Das c. 1610–1620, Royal Collection

24th Raja of Amber
- Reign: 25 January 1574 – 4 December 1589
- Coronation: 25 January 1574
- Predecessor: Bharmal
- Successor: Man Singh I

Subahdar of Lahore
- Emperor: Akbar I
- Predecessor: Said Khan
- Successor: Rai Singh

Subahdar of Kabul
- Term: 1586 (few months)
- Emperor: Akbar I
- Predecessor: Man Singh I
- Successor: Isma'il Quit Khan
- Born: c. 1527; Amber, Amber Kingdom (modern-day Rajasthan, India)
- Died: 4 December 1589 (aged 61–62); Lahore, Lahore Subah, Mughal Empire (modern day Punjab, Pakistan)
- Spouse: Bhagwati Devi Panwar; Durgavati Bai Rathore
- Issue more...: Raja Man Singh (1550–1614); Man Bai (1570–1604); Raja Madho Singh; Pratap Singh
- House: Kachhwaha
- Father: Bharmal
- Mother: Phulvati Bai of Mandore
- Religion: Hinduism

Raja Bhagwant Das (c. 1527 – 4 December 1589; Bhagavantdās) was the 23rd Kacchwaha ruler of Amber. He served as the Mughal Subahdar of Lahore and, for a brief period in 1586, as the Subahdar of Kabul.

== Life ==
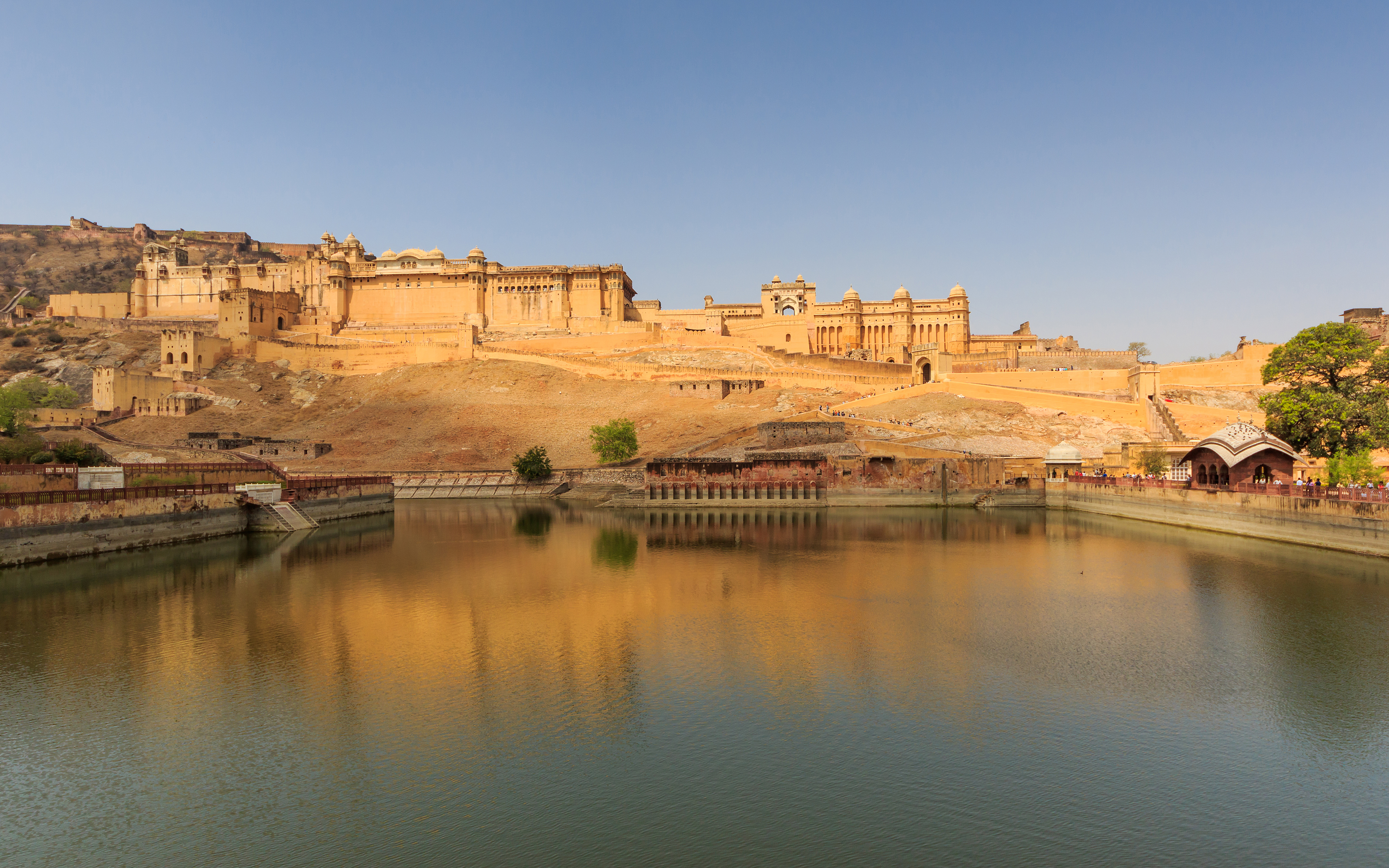
Amber Fort, in Amber, the capital of Raja Bhagwant Das.

Raja Bhagwant Das was the eldest son of Bharmal born in 1527 to his wife Phulvati of Mandore.

Bhagwant Das was one of the generals of Akbar, who awarded him a mansab (rank) of 5000 in 1585. and conferred upon him the title of Amir-ul-Umra (lit. 'chief noble'). He fought many battles for Akbar, including battles in Punjab, Kashmir, and Afghanistan, and was also the governor of Kabul. Bhagwant Das was soundly defeated by the Kashmiri king, Yousuf Shah Chak.

Bhagwant married his daughter, Man Bai, to Prince Salim, who later assumed the throne as emperor Jahangir. Their child was Jahangir's eldest son, Khusrau Mirza. He was associated with the Sant Mat figure Dadu Dayal.

== Death ==
Shortly after attending the cremation of Todar Mal at Lahore, Bhagwant Das, having suffered from a bout of vomiting and strangury, died on 4 December 1589. At the time of his death, Akbar issued a firman of condolence to his eldest son and successor, Man Singh I. The firman contained kind and gracious messages, and Akbar also sent him his own robes of honor and a bodyguard's horse. Additionally, Akbar bestowed upon him the title of Raja in honor of his father's passing. His second son, Madho Singh, became the ruler of Bhangarh.

== Issue ==
Raja Bhagwant Das had at least thirteen sons:

- Raja Man Singh
- Man Bai
- Raja Madho Singh
- Pratap Singh
- Kunwar Hardas Singh
- Kunwar Kanah
- Kunwar Vanmali Das
- Kunwar Bhiv
- Chandarsera Singh
- Sur Singh

== Popular culture ==
=== Films and television ===
- In the 2018 historical drama series Dastaan-E-Mohabbat Salim Anarkali aired on Colors TV, he is portrayed by Hemant Choudhary.

== Ancestry ==
Ancestors of Bhagwant Das

8. Chandrasen, Raja of Amber
4. Prithviraj Singh I, Raja of Amber
2. Bihari Mal, Raja of Amber
10. Lunkaran, Rao of Bikaner
5. Apurva Devi (Bala Bai)
1. Bhagwant Das
12. Ranmal, Rao of Marwar
6. Akhairaj, Rao of Bagri
Rami Bai of Nadol
3. Phulvati Bai
