= Saloli, Rajasthan =

Saloli
- Village
- Location in Rajasthan, India Saloli (India)
- Coordinates: 27.1857406°N 76.6450104°E
- Country: India
- State: Rajasthan
- District: Alwar

Government
  - Body: Gram panchayat
- Elevation: 254 m (833 ft)

Languages
  - Official: Rajasthani
- Time zone: UTC+5:30 (IST)
- PIN: 301409
- Telephone code: 01420
- ISO 3166 code: RJ-IN
- Vehicle registration: PB 37
- Post Office: Reni

Saloli is a large village located in Reni tehsil of Alwar district, Rajasthan with a total of 550 families residing. Saloli village has a population of 2807 of which 1488 are males while 1319 are females as per Population Census 2011.

In Saloli village, the population of children ages 0–6 is 437 which make up 15.57% of total population of village. Average Sex Ratio of Saloli village is 886 which are lower than Rajasthan state average of 928. Child Sex Ratio for the Saloli as per census is 1005, higher than Rajasthan average of 888.

Saloli village has lower literacy rate compared to Rajasthan. In 2011, the literacy rate of Saloli village was 64.51% compared to 66.11% of Rajasthan. In Saloli, male literacy stands at 79.06% while the female literacy rate was 47.73%.

It is situated 15 km away from sub-district headquarter Rajgarh and 48 km away from district headquarter Alwar. As per 2009 stats, Saloli village is also a gram panchayat.

== Transportation ==
The nearest Railway Station is Rajgarh (15 km from Saloli), apart from it Bandikui Railway Station is also a nearby railway station to Saloli.

== History ==
Saloli was a Jagir of Kalyanot/Kalyanwat Rajputs (One of the 12 Royal Kacchawaha Chambers known as "barah kothri" of House of Amber) in the erstwhile Alwar State. Kalyanot is a sub clan of Rajawat clan of Kachawaha Suryavanshi lineage. The Jagir was granted to Thakur Saal Singh Kalyanot, one of the descendants of King Prithviraj of Amber. The name Saloli is derived from the name of its founder Thakur Saal Singh. Other brothers of Thakur Saal Singh were Thakur Baal Singh, who founded Babeli in erstwhile Alwar State and Thakur Bhaav Singh, who founded Bhaogarh near Sikrai (Dausa). Saloli, Babeli and Bhaogarh shares the same familial lineage.
