= Ratan Singh of Amber =

Raja of Amber from 1537 to 1548

Ratan Singh
- Raja

Raja of Amber
- Reign: 22 July 1537 – 15 May 1548
- Predecessor: Bhim Singh
- Successor: Askaran
- Died: 15 May 1548
- Dynasty: Kachhwaha
- Father: Bhim Singh

Ratan Singh (died 15 May 1548) was the Rajput ruler of Amber from 1537 to 1548. Reigning during a period of political uncertainty, Ratan Singh proved to be an ineffective monarch. He faced multiple rebellions among his relatives during his short reign as well as incursions by the Sur Empire. He was assassinated and supplanted by his brother after ten years of rule.

== Life ==
Ratan Singh was the eldest son of Bhim Singh, Raja of Amber. His paternal grandparents were Raja Prithviraj Singh I and his wife Bala Bai, a daughter of Rao Lunkaran of Bikaner.

He ascended the throne upon the premature death of his father in July 1537. However, he showed himself to be an ineffective monarch, being viewed as weak and suffering from alcohol addiction. This resulted in a breakdown of order in the kingdom. Raimal, a relative from a cadet branch of the Kachwahas, took advantage of this turbulence and ceded territory from the crown for himself. Ratan Singh's paternal uncles, Sanga and Bharmal, also turned against him and attempted to launch a conspiracy, though this proved less successful.

In 1544, the Sur emperor Sher Shah Suri launched an attack against the kingdom. Already the ruler of much of Rajputana, Suri was a formidable threat who had already forced the submission of the likes of Maharana Udai Singh II of Mewar. Perhaps taking cue from the latter, Ratan Singh surrendered and accepted the suzerainty of the Afghan ruler.

By the end of his reign, Ratan Singh had earned the enmity of many of his courtiers through his use of insults. These individuals instigated his younger brother, Askaran, to make a bid for the crown and on 15 May 1548, Ratan Singh was fatally poisoned. Askaran ascended the throne, though was himself overthrown after a reign of only 16 days and was in turn succeeded by their uncle Bharmal.
