= Bhim Singh of Amber =

Raja of Amber from 1534 to 1537

Bhim Singh
- Raja

Raja of Amber
- Reign: 19 January 1534 – 22 July 1537
- Predecessor: Puranmal
- Successor: Ratan Singh
- Died: 22 July 1537
- Issue: Ratan Singh; Askaran; Sahodara Kachhvi (wife of Rao Maldev of Marwar)
- Dynasty: Kachhwaha
- Father: Prithviraj Singh I
- Mother: Bala Bai of Bikaner

Bhim Singh (died 22 July 1537) was a sixteenth-century Rajput ruler of Amber.

He was the eldest son of his father, Raja Prithviraj Singh I, by his wife Bala Bai, a daughter of Rao Lunkaran of Bikaner. Some sources allege that Prithviraj died at the hands of Bhim, who in turn was later killed by his own son Askaran. However, according to historian Jadunath Sarkar, these claims of patricide lack credibility since their sources are anonymous and undated. Bhim is also said to have overthrown his predecessor and brother Puranmal, though this too is uncertain.

Bhim only reigned for three and a half years before dying on 22 July 1537. He was succeeded in quick succession by two sons, Ratan Singh and Askaran, before the throne eventually passed to his younger brother Bharmal.

== Ancestry ==
Ancestors of Bhim Singh of Amber

8. Uddharan, Raja of Amber
4. Chandrasen, Raja of Amber
2. Prithviraj Singh I, Raja of Amber
1. Bhim Singh
Bika, Rao of Bikaner
6. Lunkaran, Rao of Bikaner
Rang Kanwar of Pugal
3. Apurva Devi (Bala Bai)
