= Kingdom of Amber =

Princely state in northwest India (1028–1949)

Coordinates: 26.985°N 75.850°E

Kingdom of Amber (1028–1727) Kingdom of Jaipur (1727–1949)
- 1028–1949
- Flag (c. 1699–1818) Coat of arms

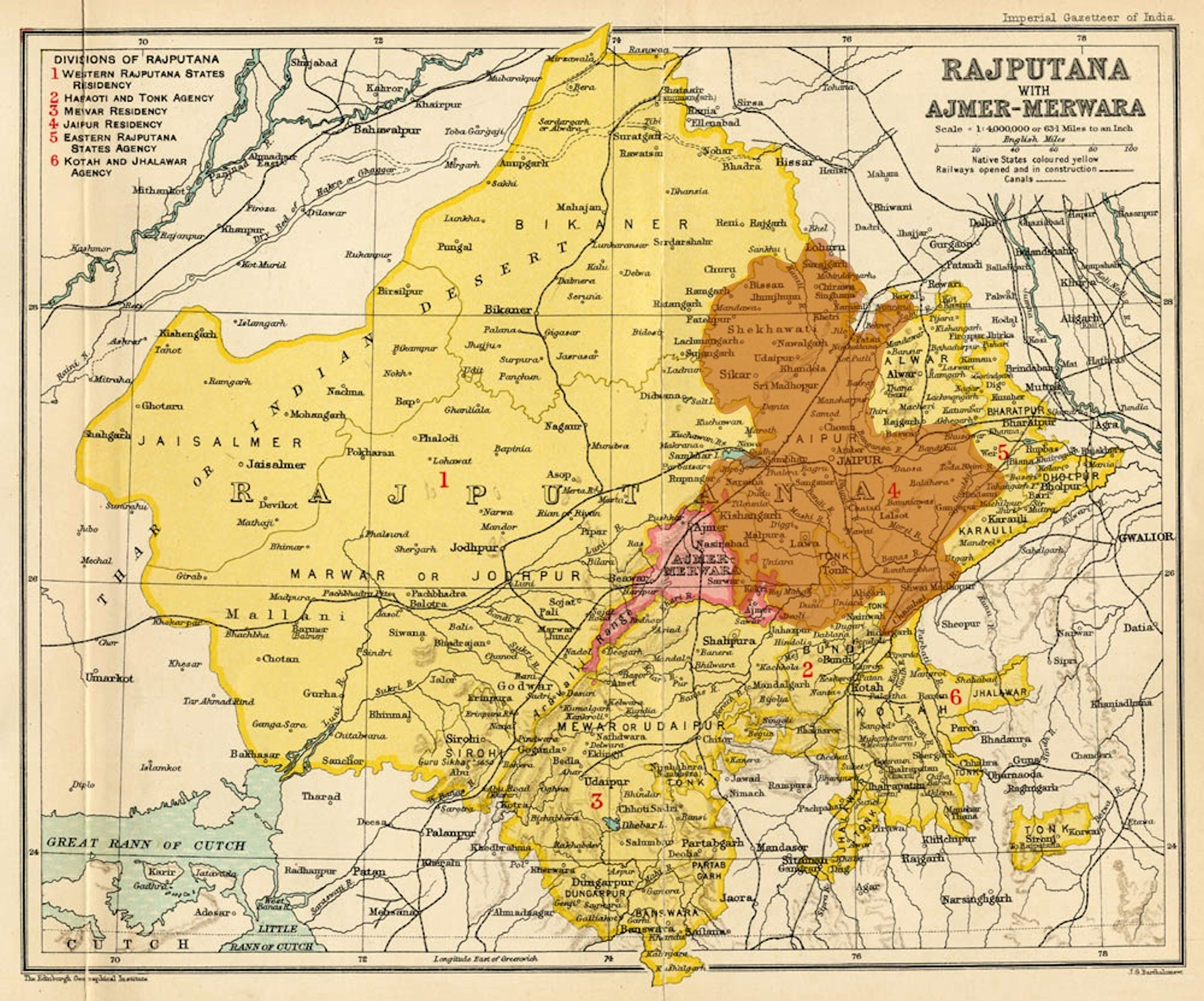
- Jaipur State within Rajputana, in the Imperial Gazetteer of India (1909)
- Status: Tributary state of Chauhans (1071–1200); Vassal state of the Kingdom of Mewar (1433–1527), Vassal state of the Mughal Empire (1562–1710); Princely state of the British East India Company (1818–1858) and Indian Empire (1858–1947)
- Capital: Dausa (966–1028); Khoh (1028–1146); Amber (1146–1727); Jaipur (1727–1949)
- Common languages: Dhundari, Hindi
- Government: Monarchy (1028–1818; 1947–1949); Princely state (1818–1947)
- Maharaja Sawai
  - 1028–1033: Dulha Rai (first)
  - 1922–1949: Man Singh II (last)
- History
  - Established: 1028
  - Acceded to India: 1949

Area
- 1931: 43,900 km^{2} (16,900 sq mi)

Population
  - 1931: 26,31,775
- Currency: Indian Rupee
Preceded by	Succeeded by
Khoh	Rajputana Agency; Dominion of India
- Today part of: Rajasthan, India

The Kingdom of Amber, later known as Kingdom of Jaipur and Jaipur State, was located in the historic north-eastern Dhundhar region of Rajputana and was ruled by the Kachwaha Rajput clan. It was established by Rao Dulha Rai, possibly the last ruler of the Kachchhapaghata dynasty of Gwalior, who later migrated from Narwar to Dausa and established his kingdom there with the support of Chahamanas of Shakambhari with coalition of Gaur dynasty of Sheopur in the 11th century. Primarily through the period spanning between the 11th and 15th centuries, the kingdom faced stagnation, and resources were scarce.

Under Raja Bharmal, the kingdom became a vassal of the Mughal Empire under Akbar. His son and grandson, Raja Bhagwant Das and Raja Man Singh I respectively, were leading generals in Akbar's army and helped him in expanding the empire. Mariam-uz-Zamani, popularly identified by the misnomer Jodha Bai, was Akbar's chief consort, and gave birth to Akbar's successor Jahangir. Mirza Raja Jai Singh I served under Shah Jahan and became a distinguished general. He fell out of Aurangzeb's favour when he was suspected of helping Shivaji escape from Mughal captivity in 1664. Sawai Jai Singh II became the ruler as the Mughal Empire waned. He successfully rebelled against the Mughals in 1708 to wrest back control over the kingdom. After Jai Singh's death, the kingdom was drained of its resources during the civil war amongst his sons Ishwari Singh and Madho Singh I and the Marathas.

It became a princely state under the English East India Company after signing a treaty in 1818 that led to a subsidiary alliance with the latter, following the Third Anglo-Maratha War. It acceded to an independent India in 1947 and was integrated into the Union by 1949. Upon integration, the ruler was granted a pension (privy purse), certain privileges, and the use of the title "Maharaja of Jaipur" by the Government of India. However, the pension, privileges, and the use of the title were stripped in 1971 by the 26th Amendment to the Constitution of India.

== History ==
=== Origins ===
The Kachwaha Rajputs claim descent from Kusha, son of the legendary Rama. Their ancestors allegedly migrated from Rama's kingdom of Kosala and established a new dynasty at Gwalior. After 33 generations, they migrated to Rajputana in 1028 AD.

Some historians associate Dulha Rao, the founder of the Jaipur Kachhwaha lineage, with the Kachchhapaghata dynasty that ruled over a part of Rajasthan and Madhya Pradesh in 10th century. It is possible that Dulha Rao descended from the Narwar branch of this dynasty. V. S. Bhargava associates Dulha with the successor of the last ruler of the Narwar branch, Tejaskaran.

According to Jadunath Sarkar, Dulha's grandfather Ishwar Singh, the ruler of Narwar, renounced his throne and divided his estate among his younger brother and his nephew and travelled North of Chambal to live a life of religious recluse. After his death, his son Sodo crowned himself king again but soon died and was succeeded by his son Dulha who built support for his cause and soon received the fort of Dausa in dowry from the Chauhans of Lalsot. M. L. Sharma suggests that Dulha was placed in Dausa particularly to help fight the Bargujar chief who partly controlled the city. Dulha Rao soon defeated the Meenas of Khoh and Manchi and later completed the conquest of Dhundhar by defeating the Bargurjar after which he was granted the captured land by the Chauhans. Dulha chose Khoh as his capital after Dausa.

=== Early rulers ===
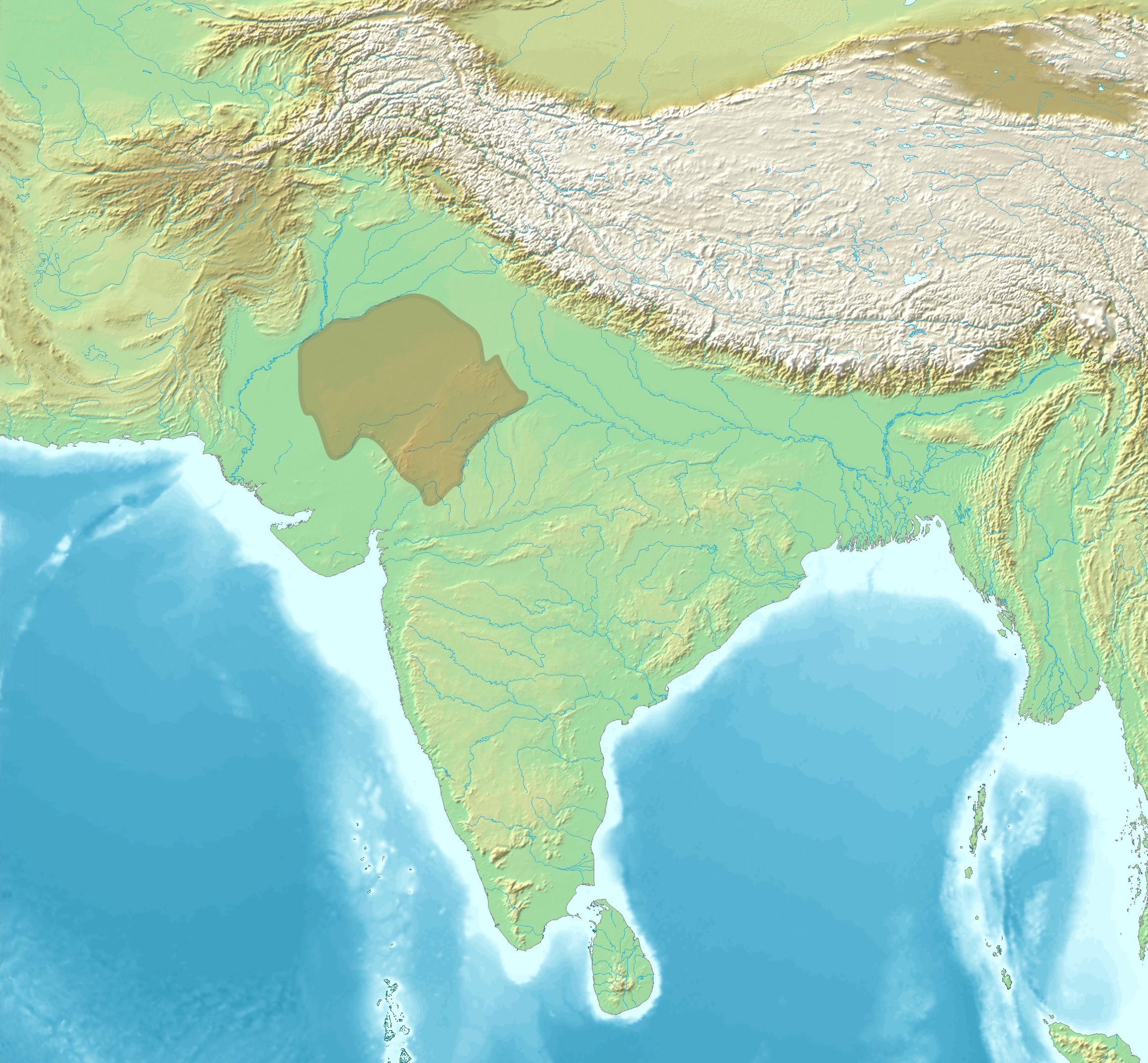
Location of Amber within Rajputana circa 1525, with neighbouring polities, on the eve of the establishment of the Mughal Empire.

Dulha's successor, Kakil captured Amber from the Meenas and laid foundation of the future capital. But some sources attribute the change of capital from Khoh to Ambar to Rajdeo who was the third in succession after Pajawan. The early rulers of Dhundar may have been feudatories of the Chahamanas of Shakambhari as its ruler Pajjun is referred as such in the Prithviraj Raso. Pajjun's successor Malesi consolidated power in Dhundar by marrying into neighboring regions and also may have defeated the ruler of Mandu in the battle of Rutroli. Udaikaran ascended to the throne in 1367. He defeated the Khyam-Khanis to secure Dhundar as a Kachhwaha territory.

Under Rai Chandrasen in the 15th century, Kachhwahas were defeated by Kumbha of Mewar and he extracted tribute from Dhundar. Chandrasen was succeeded by Prithviraj Singh in 1503. Rima Hooja explains that the relation between Prithviraj and Sanga was not exactly a feudal-chief relation in modern understanding but closer to a junior ally. Prithviraj joined the Rajput Confederacy of 1527 led by Rana Sanga against Babur and fought in the Battle of Khanwa in which they were defeated. He, along with Maldeo Rathore, rescued Rana Sanga from the battlefield of Khanwa in 1527. Rana Sanga was poisoned by his nobles two months after the battle for insisting to continue fighting a lost war and Prithviraj died in November of the same year. V. S. Bhatnagar suggests that the death of Prithviraj may have been similar to Sanga's as his multiple nobles readily joined the Mughals soon after his death.

He was succeeded by his preferred son Puranmal, son of his favorite wife. Eventually, Humayun assisted Puranmal achieve stability. Puranmal could only rule for 7 years. According to conflicting sources, he either died fighting for or against Humayu's brother Hindal Mirza or was overthrown by his brother Bhim Singh. Bhim Singh was quickly succeeded by his son Ratan Singh in 1537. During his reign, Sher Shah Suri invaded Rajputana and established control over Mewar and Marwar. Ratan Singh also accepted Suri suzerainty. During his reign, his uncle and son of Prithviraj, Sanga captured a part of territory and called it Sanganer where he was succeeded by his brother Bharmal. Ratan Singh was incompetent and was not able to control the actions of his uncles. Ratan Singh was poisoned by his half-brother Askaran but he was quickly deposed by the nobles who placed Bharmal on the throne.

=== As a Mughal ally under Bharmal and Bhagwant Das ===
Bharmal had to initially deal with Sur general Haji Khan Pathan but was able to make peace with him. Soon, governor of Mewat, Mirza Muhammad Sharif-ud-din Hussain, who supported the cause of the son of Puranmal, Suja attacked Amber in 1558. Bharmal surrendered to Sharif-ud-din and also had to give up his son and nephews as hostages.

Feeling insecure after Sharif-ud-din's treaty, Bharmal, through his brother Rupsi, arranged a meeting with Mughal Emperor Akbar at Sanganer where they met in 1562. Here, Bharmal offered his daughter Jodha Bai's hand in marriage. The marriage took place in the same year in Sambhar. Bharmal's sons Bhagwant Das and Jagannath along with his grandson Man Singh were inducted into the Imperial court. The Kachhwaha princes in the Mughal court proved very vital because of their administrative and military skills and the Kachhwahas rose in prominence. Jodha Bai, now named Mariam-uz-Zamani also gained prestige in the Mughal court both during the reign of her husband and that of her son as Empress and Queen mother respectively. Bharmal died in 1574 and was succeeded by his son Raja Bhagwant Das, a trusted ally of Akbar.

Bhagwant Das was an exceptional military general and he accompanied Akbar throughout his expansion of the Mughal Empire across Rajasthan, Gujarat, Kashmir and the Punjab. In order to strengthen the ties with Mughals, he married his daughter Manbhavati Bai to Akbar's son Prince Salim. Bhagwant Das headed the Kashmir expedition of Akbar where in 1586, he defeated Yousuf Shah Chak and captured Kashmir. Das was appointed the subedar of Punjab in 1583 where he died in 1589.

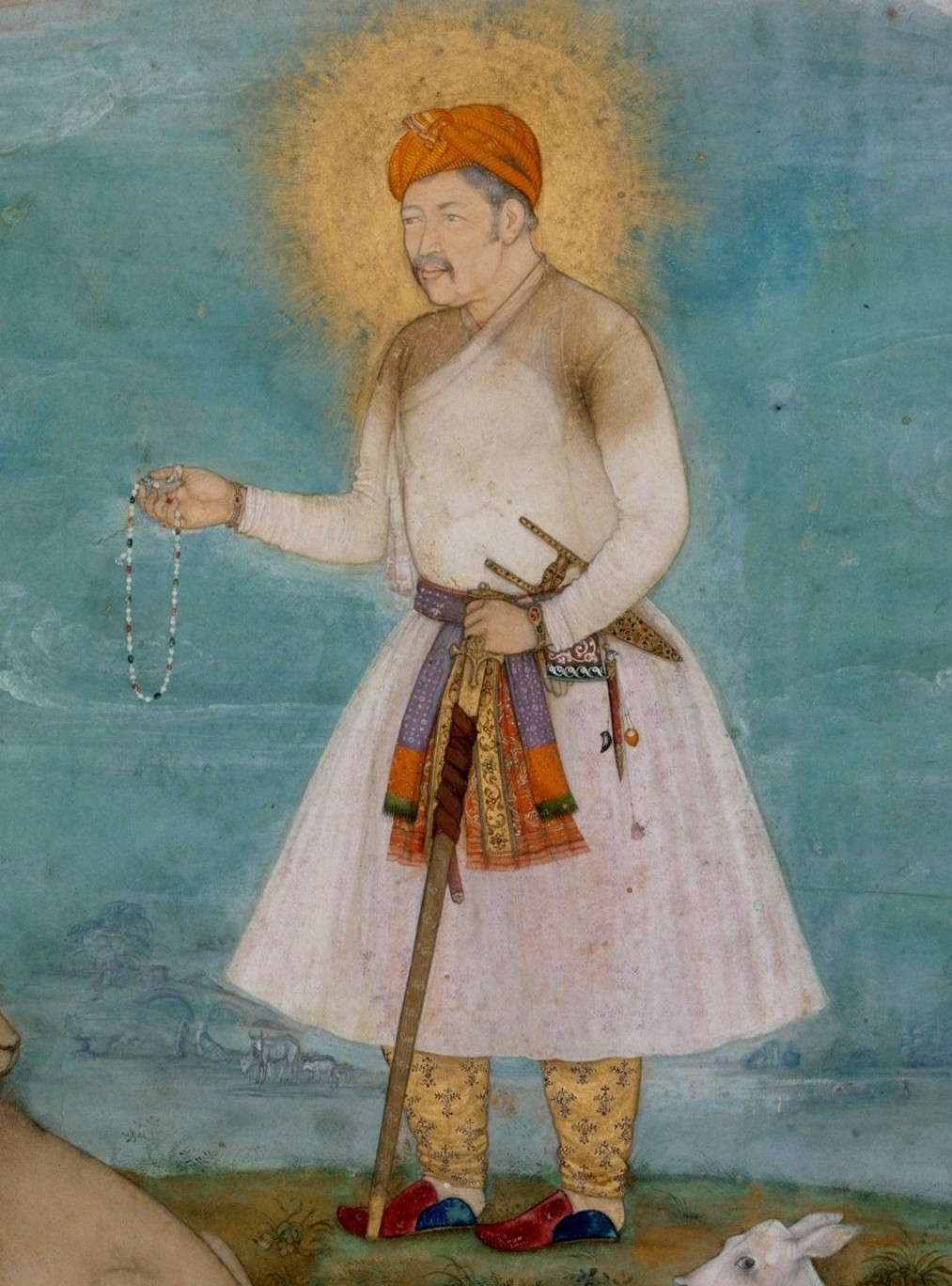
Akbar, a long-time ally of the Kachhwahas of Amber

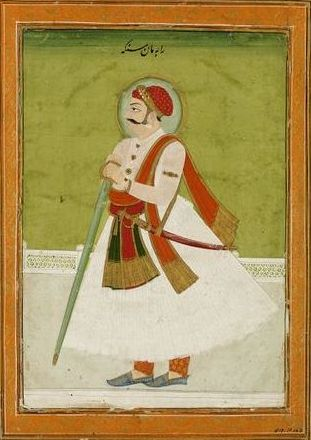
Raja Man Singh (1550–1614) was a trusted general of the Mughal emperor Akbar, who included him among the Navaratnas, or the nine gems of the royal court of Akbar.

=== Raja Man Singh ===
==== Initial campaigns under Akbar ====
Bhagwant was succeeded by his son Man Singh I who was an instrumental part of the Mughal Army and diplomacy. He took part in Akbar's conquest of Chittor in 1568 and Ranthambhore in 1569. He was the part of negotiations with Mewar which failed, resulting in the Battle of Haldighati.

Man Singh was also given the command of the Mughal forces in Haldighati where he fought against Pratap Singh on 18 June 1576. In the ensuing battle, Man Singh was able to force Pratap to retreat and killed several of his commanders. Pratap had to retreat back to the hills of Gogunda and the battle was won by the Mughals.

==== Campaigns in Kabul, Bihar, Orissa and Bengal ====
In 1580, the Islamic orthodoxy of the Mughal empire, upset with Akbar's liberal policies, declared Akbar's step brother Mirza Muhammad Hakim as the emperor instead. Man Singh was deputed in the North-Western section of the Mughal Empire under his father. Man Singh defeated Shadman Khan at Neelab in December 1580. Soon, Hakim himself marched to Punjab and laid siege to Lahore but later retreated. Man Singh followed and defeated him in 1581. Eventually, Hakim swore allegiance to Akbar once again and he was reappointed the Governor of Kabul. Hakim held this position till 1585 when he died.

Soon after Hakim's death, the Yusufzai tribe of Afghanistan rebelled against the Mughals and launched attacks against Mughals stationed in the region. One of the attacks ended up killing Raja Birbal with 8000 Mughal troops. Man Singh along with Raja Todar Mal were sent to defeat the Yusufzai's in 1586. By 1587, Man Singh's service in Kabul was over and he was deployed in the Subah of Bihar.

In Bihar, Man Singh first defeated several rebellious rulers like Puranmal followed by the Raja of Khadagpur and the Raja of Gaya and Sabhupuri in 1590. Next, Man Singh was sent to capture Orissa which was under the control of Afghan chief Qutlu Khan and his son Nasir Khan. After Qutlu Khan's death, Nasir Khan who decided to make peace with Man Singh and accepted Mughal supremacy. Man Singh acquired the Jagannath temple at Puri. In 1591, after the death of Isa Khan, the Afghan chiefs rebelled again and Man Singh invaded again and beat them conclusively.

Man Singh was soon transferred to Bengal in 1594 where he first shifted his capital to Rajmahal from Tandah. He subdued ruler of Dacca and Cooch Bihar. While in Bengal, Man Singh's eldest son, Jagat Singh died due to excessive drinking, after which he returned to Amber temporarily but soon had to return to deal with a rebellious Usman Khan whom he defeated in 1601 in Sherpur followed by defeating Kedar Rai in Dacca. By 1604, Bengal was again completely under Mughal control.

==== After Akbar's death ====
Towards the end of 1604, Akbar fell ill. Man Singh planned on placing his grandson Prince Khusrau on throne instead of his rebellious son Salim. He made several attempts like transferring Salim to Bengal, lobbying in the court, and trying to muster support but nothing worked. Eventually, disappointed, he left for Bengal and Akbar died in 1605 and was succeeded by Salim as Emperor Jahangir. Jahangir treated Man Singh well and also included him in the Deccan frontier. But after 1605, Man Singh could not lead any glorious ventures and died in Elichpur in 1614 and was succeeded by his only surviving son Bhau Singh overlooking a grandson Maha Singh.

Man Singh was a great builder and built several forts and temples across India. He built the Govind Dev Ji Temple in Brindavan and renovated the Sarovar Ghat in Varanasi and built several temples there.

Bhau Singh was sent on a campaign against Malik Ambar but failed because Ambar's army was much more efficient. He died in 1621 and had no heirs, so he was succeeded by Maha Singh's son Jai Singh.

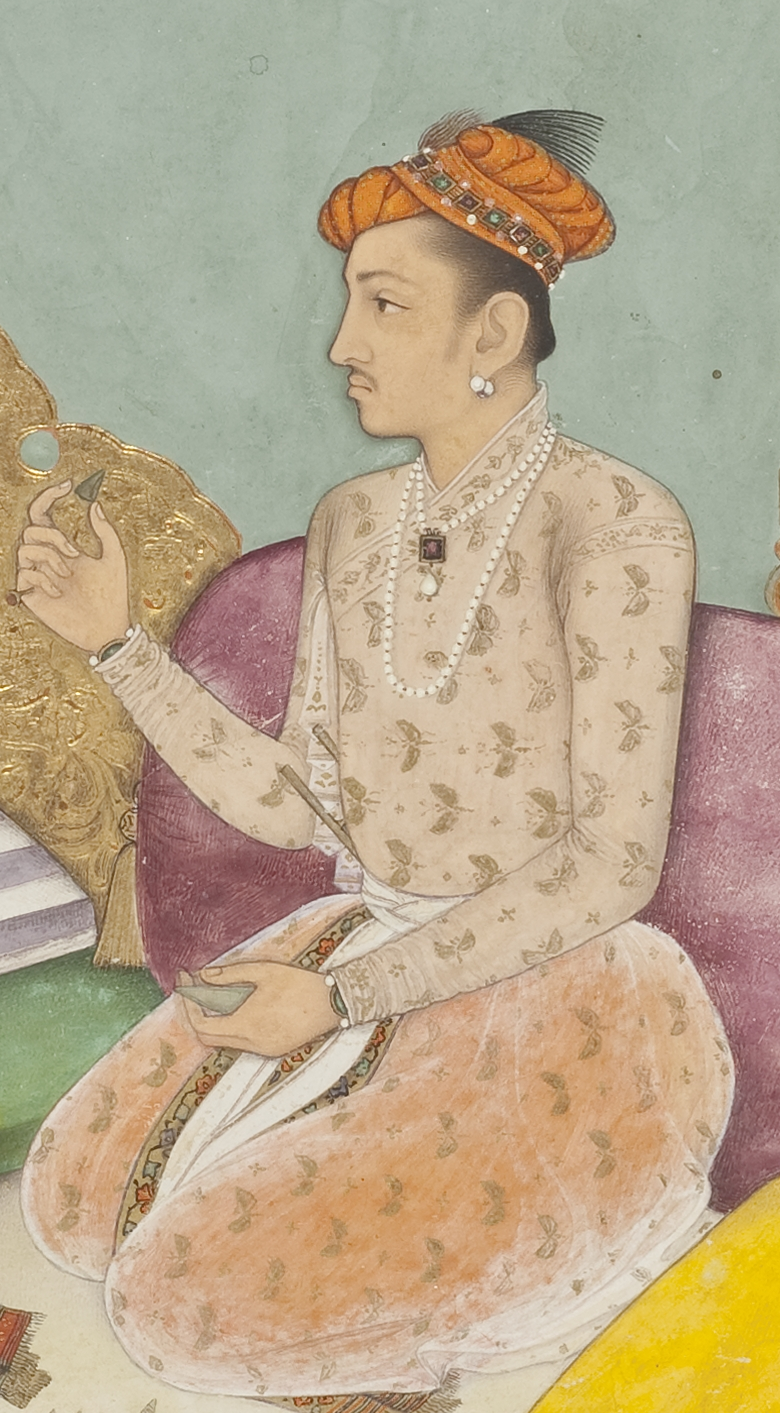
Jai Singh I, the most decorated military general of the Mughal army in the 17th century who commanded the army under Shah Jahan and Aurangzeb.

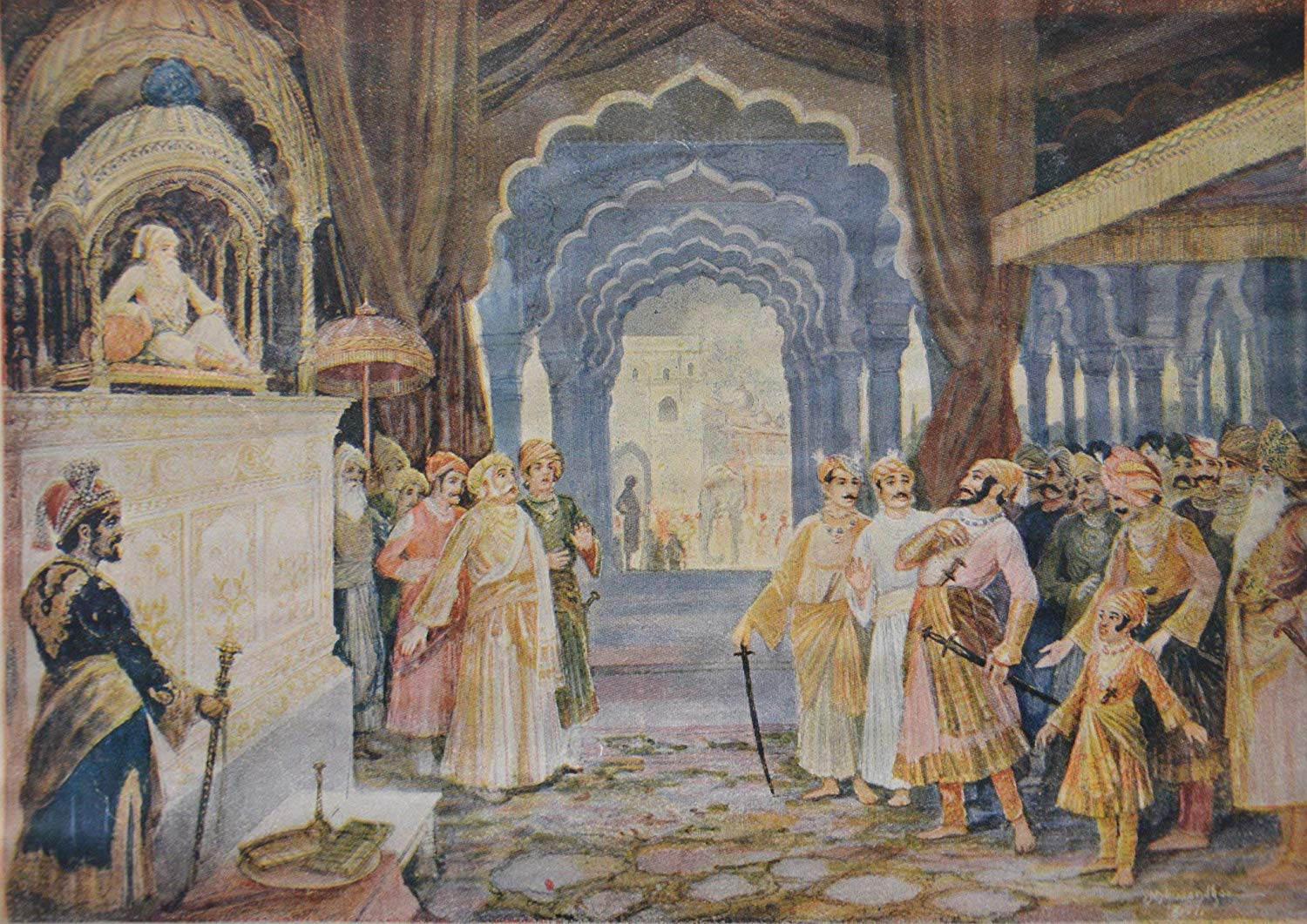
Jai Singh fell out of Aurangzeb's favor when the imprisoned Shivaji escaped from Agra.

=== Mirza Raja Jai Singh ===
After ascending to the throne of Amber at the age of 11, his first task was to defend against the rebellious Prince Khurram. Khurram looted Amber in 1623 but was defeated by Jai in 1624. After Jahangir's death in 1627, instead of joining Noor Jahan's son Shahryar, Jai supported Khurram who went on to become Shah Jahan. Soon, Jai Singh would become one of the most decorated generals of the Mughal Imperial army and received many decorations from Shah Jahan.

==== Facilitation under Shah Jahan ====
Jai was first deputed to suppress a rebellion in Mahaban and then sent to fight Nazr Muhammad in Kabul. Jai was also tasked with dealing with the rebellious Khan-i-Jahan in Ghatpur. In 1631, he was part of the campaign against Bijapur Sultanate. He commanded his forces and distinguished himself during the Siege of Parenda and Daulatabad in 1635. After the command of the army was handed to Prince Aurangzeb in 1636, Jai Singh also won the fort of Nagpur and Devgarh in 1637.

In 1639, because of his display of immense valor, he was bestowed upon, the unique title of Mirza Raja by Shah Jahan. In 1654, he was sent to Chittor to confront Maharana Raj Singh for violating the 1616 treaty by carrying out repairs to the Chittorgarh.

==== The war of succession of Shah Jahan ====
When the war of succession of 1657 broke out, Jai Singh was deputed to convince Prince Shuja to end his rebellion but failed. He later defeated Shuja in Bahadurpur in 1658. Later, Shuja surrendered to Dara Shikoh and was given the charge of Bengal. Raja Jaswant Singh of Marwar was defeated by Prince Aurangzeb and Murad in 1658 and they marched towards Agra. Jai Singh could not reach Agra in time and Dara Shikoh was defeated in the Battle of Samugarh. Soon, Jai Singh presented himself in front of the new emperor Aurangzeb and was tasked with capturing Dara Shikoh. He defeated Shikoh in the Battle of Deorai in 1659. Dara sought refuge under Malik Jeevan but he was betrayed and turned in with Jai Singh who brought him back to Agra.

==== Struggle with Aurangzeb over Shivaji ====
In 1664, Jai Singh was sent to command the campaign against Shivaji. In 1665, Jai Singh laid siege to Purandar fort and was able to get Shivaji to sign the Treaty of Purandar according to which Shivaji would surrender 23 forts, send his son Sambhaji to Mughal court and enter Mughal service. Jai wanted to utilize Shivaji's forces against Bijapur and wanted Shivaji to make peace with Aurangzeb. Jai Singh was able to convince Aurangzeb to meet Shivaji and vice-versa, after which he took Shivaji to Agra to meet the Mughal emperor. When Shivaji reached the Mughal court, he felt insulted and walked out of the hall without meeting Aurangzeb. While Jai tried to convince Aurangzeb to utilize Shivaji against Bijapur, several influential Mughal nobles wanted him killed. In a dilemma, Shivaji was housed with a Mughal noble.

On 18 August 1665 Shivaji made a dramatic escape from Agra and both Jai Singh and his son Ram Singh fell out of Aurangzeb's favor. Jai Singh made several bad attempts at battle in the next one month and spent a lot of his personal resources trying to make his dream Bijapur invasion happen but failed. He was recalled to Agra and he died in 1667 in Burhanpur.

His successor Ram Singh was pardoned and was sent to fight Ahom force. Ram Singh was eventually defeated in the Battle of Saraighat. Ram Singh grew sick of war and finally, in 1676 he was allowed to leave and return to his province. He was later posted in Kohat where he died in 1688. His grandson Bishan Singh was tasked with controlling the Jat revolt at Mathura in which he succeeded. Around this time, Aurangzeb grew hostile towards Bishan and ordered him to fight in the Deccan, which Bishan declined and was instead transferred to Afghanistan and his son Jai was ordered to fight instead. Bishan Singh died in 1700 and was succeeded by his son Sawai Jai Singh.

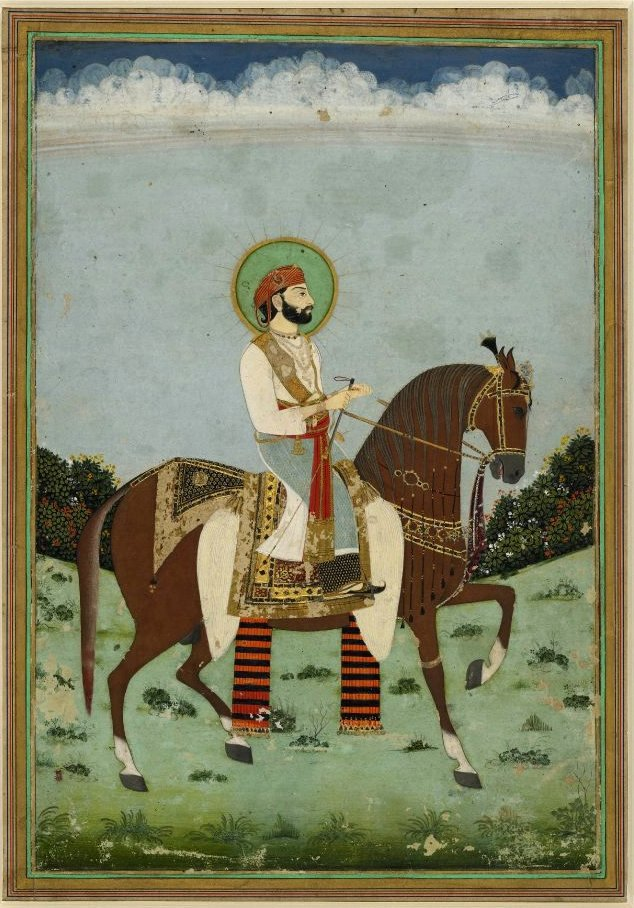
Jai Singh II (1688–1743) founded the fortified city of Jaipur and made it his capital.

=== Sawai Jai Singh II ===
Bishan Singh was succeeded by his son Jai Singh II also known as Sawai Jai Singh. During his rule, the new capital city of Jaipur was founded in 1727.

As the new ruler of Dhundar, he was sent to the Deccan with Prince Bidar Bakht. Jai's forces demonstrated talent by defeating the Marathas at Khelna, Khandesh, Malwa and Burhanpur. Through these victories, Jai Singh II rebuilt the lost trust of Aurangzeb for the Kachhwaha family. He was conferred with the title Sawai by Aurangzeb. In 1705, he was appointed the Naib Subedar of Malwa which helped increase his power.

==== The war of succession of Aurangzeb ====
In 1707, Emperor Aurangzeb died and a war of succession began. Initially, Muhammad Azam Shah was able to capture the throne. Jai Singh supported Azam Shah and his son Bidar Bakht but then Azam Shah was eventually defeated and killed at the Battle of Jajau in the same year. Prince Muazzam crowned himself as Bahadur Shah I and he was hostile against Jai Singh. This hostility resulted in Bahadur Shah replacing Jai Singh with Bijai Singh, his younger brother, loyal to the Mughal emperor.

==== The Rajput rebellion of 1708 ====
In 1708, Bahadur Shah invaded Marwar and captured the entire state. This encouraged the major Rajput kingdoms, the Mewar, Marwar and Dhundar to form an alliance to fight against Bahadur Shah. Raja Ajit Singh of Marwar, Rana Amar Singh II of Mewar and Jai Singh II together left the Mughal camp in rebellion. To establish Matrimonial alliance, Jai married Chandra Kanwar, the daughter of Amar Singh II and Suraj Kanwar, the daughter of Ajit Singh. The three rulers marched together towards Jodhpur and took its control and by October 1708, Amber had also been taken over and Jai Singh restored as the Raja. The same year, the alliance marched against the Mughals at Sambhar and captured it which was then jointly ruled. Eventually, in 1710, Bahadur Shah decided to make peace with the Rajputs and accepted Ajit and Jai Singh as the rulers of their lands.

Bijai Singh was executed in 1729 for conspiring to overthrow Jai Singh.

==== Return to influence ====
After Bahadur Shah's death in 1712 and Jahandar Shah's overthrowing in 1713 and subsequent crowning of Emperor Farukhsiyar, Jai Singh regained his stature in the Mughal court and became an influential entity but he could never become as paramount as the Sayyid Brothers in the Mughal court. Jai Singh was appointed as the Subedar of Malwa in 1713 just in time to face and repel Maratha incursions in 1715. He was trusted with the task of dealing with the Jat chief Churaman who was besieged at Thun. He used his influence over the Sayyid brothers to negotiate a peace deal. In 1719, Farrukhsiyar was murdered by Sayyid brothers and Ajit Singh and was replaced by Rafi-ud-Darjat and Rafi-ud-Daulah in quick successions and eventually settled for Roshan Akhtar who became Emperor Muhammad Shah. Till 1720, Muhammad Shah got rid of the Sayyid brothers and Ajit Singh fell out of this favor, making Jai Singh even more powerful.

In 1722, Jai Singh was recalled to deal with Churaman. Jai Singh again laid siege to the fort of Thun and by 1722, Churaman committed suicide, his nephew Badan Singh accepted Mughal dominance and his son Mokham sought refuge in Mewar. By this time, Sawai Jai Singh II had become a very influential person in India and he was looked upon by all major leaders including the Peshwa, Nizam and other fellow Rajputs. It is also believed that Jai Singh had enough influence on Ajit Singh's son Abhay Singh that in 1724, he instigated him to murder and take over as the Raja of Marwar which he did with the help of his brother Bakht Singh. Jai Singh was again stationed at Malwa in 1729 to repel Maratha raids but this time, the Maratha force under Malhar Rao Holkar and Ranoji Scindia was much more powerful and Jai Singh II was defeated at the Battle of Mandsaur in 1732 after which he had to pay Chauth from 28 parganas.

In 1734, Jai Singh tried to put forward a pact at Hurda for mutual cooperation against the Marathas but nothing came out of it and it was never enforced. Marathas raided Rajputana, this time striking close to Jaipur, eventually obtaining even larger amounts of tribute in the form of chauth. In 1736, Jai Singh met Peshwa Baji Rao I at Bhambhola where he tried to convince him to sustain Muhammad Shah rule as a nominal head and take over the administration which appealed to the Peshwa but this was made unrealistic after Nader Shah's sack of Delhi in 1740.

In 1740, Jai Singh ousted Rao Budh Singh from Bundi and crowned Dalel Singh and placed Zorawar Singh in Bikaner and made Abhay Singh make peace with Bikaner. In 1741, Jai Singh fought Bakht Singh of Marwar in the Battle of Gangwana and suffered immense losses in the war. He never recovered from this battle and died 2 years later.

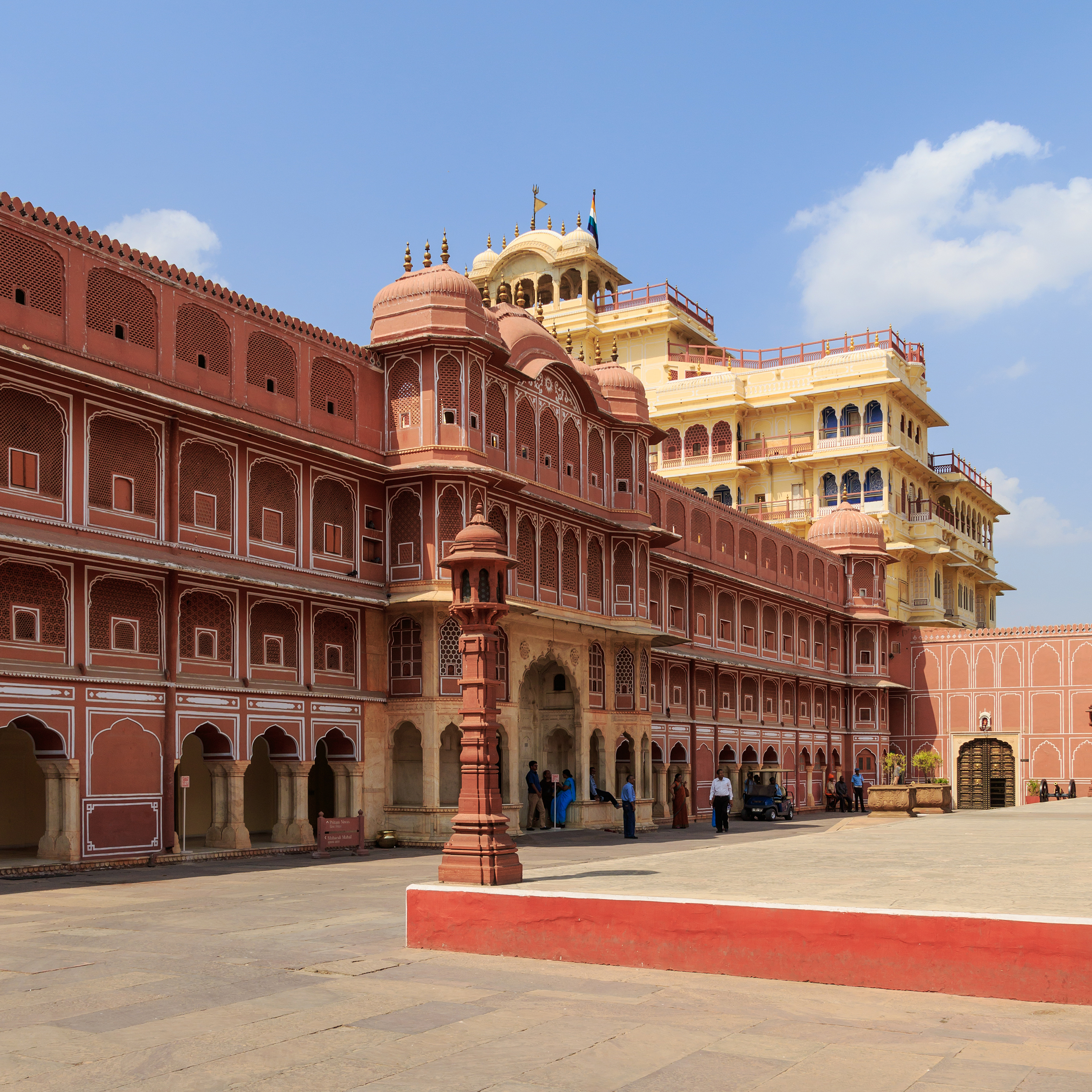
The City Palace, Jaipur.

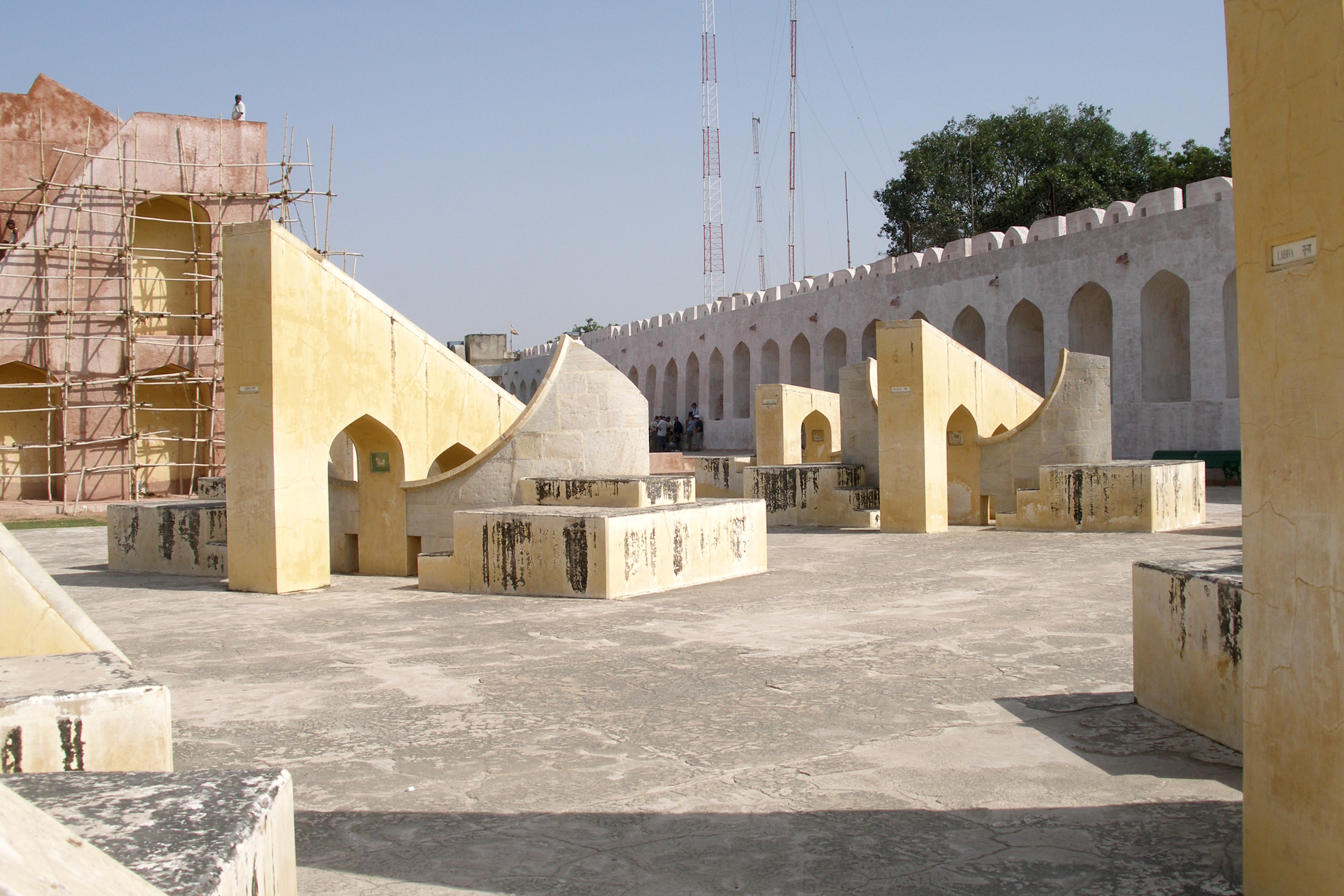
Jaipur Jantar Mantar, an astronomical observatory constructed by Sawai Jai Singh for personal observations.

==== Astronomy, Science and Mathematics ====
Sawai Jai Singh II was a great patron of Science, Mathematics, Scholarship, Art, Architecture and Literature. Well acquainted with Indian and Greek mathematics, Jai Singh was aware of contemporary developments in Europe in the field of mathematics. He also made contacts with the Portuguese king Emmanuel in 1727 comparing Portuguese astronomical observations with Indian and pointing out that Indian versions were better. He made several instruments to make astronomical observations including small brass instruments to 24-meter stone structures and observatories called Jantar Mantar. Two Jatar-Mantars still exist in usable state, one in Delhi, one in Jaipur.

In 1727, He planned and founded a new capital city called Jaipur. He examined Indian traditions of architecture under the supervision of a Bengali Brahmin called Vidyadhar Bhattacharya. The city had streets and lanes that intersect each other at right angles and havelis, temples, gardens, civic buildings were built at pre-planned places. Much of this was completed by 1733.

Sawai Jai Singh II died on 21 September 1743.

=== Civil War between Ishwari and Madho Singh ===
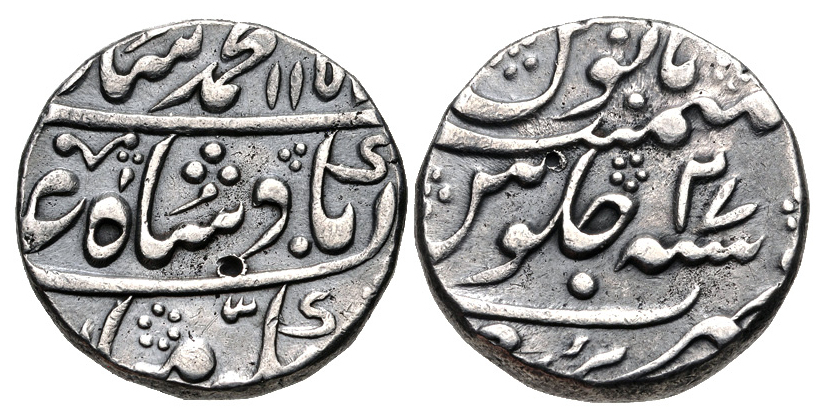
Coinage of Jaipur from the time of Ishvari Singh, in the name of the Mughal emperor Muhammad Shah. Sawau Jaipur mint, dated 1744-5 CE.

His eldest son Ishvari Singh ascended to the throne due to the right of primogeniture and was supported by the Mughals and the Marathas. His position was disputed by his younger brother Madho Singh who claimed that his grandfather Rana Amar Singh II was promised in 1708 that the son through his daughter Chandra Kanwar would inherit the throne regardless of primogeniture rules. Madho Singh's cousin Rana Jagat Singh II immediately presented his support for Madho. The Maharana invited Kota’s Rao Durjansal and Umaid Singh of Bundi against Ishwari Singh. Both sides were about to face each other in battle but the war was prevented by Madho accepting Toda and Tonk along with some other parganas in grant.

The Maharana tried to lay siege to Jaipur but Ishwari Singh was able to get the Marathas to repel them. Eventually the Maharana was able to win the support of Malhar Rao Holkar and the forces met at Battle of Rajmahal in 1747 in which Madho Singh and his commanders had to retreat and were forced to pay tribute. Madho Singh tried again at the Battle of Bagru and was able to defeat Ishwari Singh but Ishwari remained on throne. Malhar Rao again laid siege to Jaipur in 1750, and Ishwari did not have enough force to defend so he consumed poison and killed himself leaving his throne for his brother Madho Singh.

=== Decline at hands of the Marathas ===
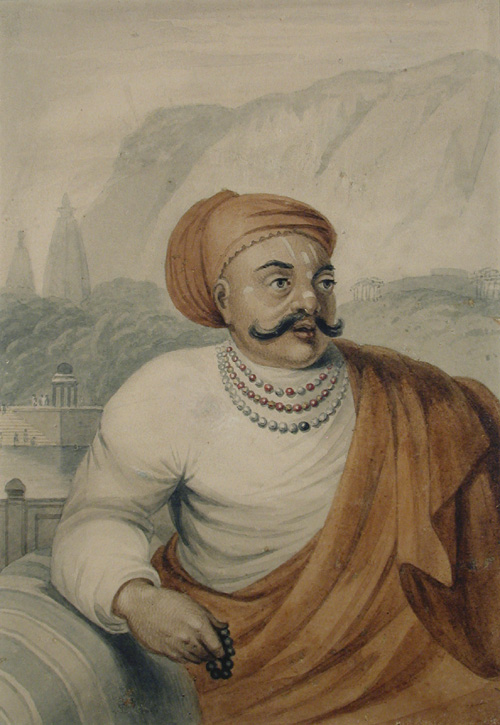
Mahadji Scindia, the Maratha chief who raided the Rajputana throughout the late 18th century weakening Rajput states

After the civil war, Sawai Madho Singh was unable to repay the Marathas who frequently raided Jaipur from 1751 to 1759 and extracted ransom money, hurting the financial situation of Dhundhar. Raghunath Rao, Jankoji Rao Scindia and Malhar Rao Holkar invaded Jaipur several times, extracting lakhs of rupees in Chauth. Madho tried to invade Kota in 1761 but was defeated at the battle of Bhatwara. He tried to invade Bharatpur in 1767 but died in 1768 succeeded by his 5 year-old son Sawai Prithvi Singh who died because of falling from a horse in 1778 and was succeeded by his 13 year-old brother Sawai Pratap Singh. During this time, a senior noble of the Kachhwaha court, Pratap Singh Naruka supported the rival claim of Prithvi Singh's son Man Singh and also invited Mahadaji Shinde to attack Jaipur. Marwar and Dhundar joined hands to face Mahadji at the Battle of Tunga in 1784 in which they had a win with small margins. In 1787, Mahadji Scindia and his force led by General Benoît de Boigne invaded Jaipur but had to retreat after failure at the Battle of Lalsot. He again invaded and defeated Jaipur army at the Battle of Patan in 1790. Throughout the 1790s, the Marathas extracted a lot of tribute from Dhundar worsening its financial situation.

In 1799, Maratha commander Vaman Rao and an Irish Commander George Thomas who faced Pratap Singh at the Battle of Fatehpur in 1799. The Rao-Thomas alliance faced difficulty and were advised by the commander of Daulat Rao Sindhia, General Pierre Perron to retreat. Next year, Daulat Rao and General Perron defeated Pratap Singh at the Battle of Malpura. Sawai Pratap Singh died in 1803 leaving the throne to his son Sawai Jagat Singh.

Jagat Singh had been chosen as the fiancé of Krishna Kumari, the princess of Mewar after Bhim Singh of Marwar died in 1803 but Bhim's successor Man Singh of Marwar insisted that he must be the husband of Krishna Kumari. Soon, Jagat Singh, with the support of Pindari chief Amir Khan faced Man Singh at the battle of Gingoli. Marwar was defeated and Mehrangarh was besieged. Shortly afterwards, Amir Khan changed sides and allied with Man Singh. Krishna Kumari was eventually poisoned to put an end to the conflict. From 1807 to 1813, Amir Khan, backed by Yashwantrao Holkar raided Jaipur and extracted lakhs of rupees in chauth.

Towards the end of the 18th century, the Jats of Bharatpur and the Kachwaha chief of Alwar declared themselves independent from Jaipur and each annexed the eastern portion of Jaipur's territory. Nevertheless, enough wealth remained in Jaipur for the patronage of fine temples/palaces, continuity of its courtly traditions and the well-being of its citizens and merchant communities. The Jaipur rulers also made large scale punya-udik (charitable) grants to many Charans, Brahmans, Bhats (bards) and various Vaishnavite institutions.

=== Under the British Empire ===
==== Initial treaty ====
A treaty was initially made by Maharaja Sawai Jagat Singh and the British under Governor General Marquis Wellesley in 1803, however the treaty was dissolved shortly afterwards by Wellesley's successor, Lord Cornwallis. In this event, Jaipur's Ambassador to Lord Lake observed that "This was the first time, since the English government was established in India, that it had been known to make its faith subservient to its convenience". In 1818, after the Third Anglo-Maratha War Jagat Singh decided to enter the subsidiary alliance with the British under which it was decided that

- Jaipur state agreed to give rupees eight lakhs as khiraj annually to the East India Company.
- It would receive British protection and support.

Sawai Jagat Singh died 9 months after the signing of this treaty and left no heir. A faction of nobles in the court tried to place Mohan Singh, the son of the chief of Narwar on the throne but the widow of Jagat Singh declared that she was pregnant with the heir which was later confirmed. Sawai Jai Singh III was born in 1819 and was recognized as the Raja.

==== Instability ====
The Financial condition of Jaipur worsened after Prime Minister Nazir Mohan Ram was ousted by the queen mother and eventually the troops of Jaipur started demanding pay and British had to militarily intervene. Most of Jai Singh III's reign was spent in court rivalries and instability of the state and in 1833, Queen-mother died and in 1835 Jai III also died. Soon rumors spread that Prime Minister Jhutaram had poisoned Jai Singh III to ensure more power for themselves. The British had to intervene again. An Infant Sawai Ram Singh II succeeded Jai III. Another misunderstanding started a rumor that the British Political agent had assassinated the Infant Raja which led to an uprising. Later, after a judicial review, several Jaipur ministers were hanged.

==== Reforms under the British and Ram Singh II ====
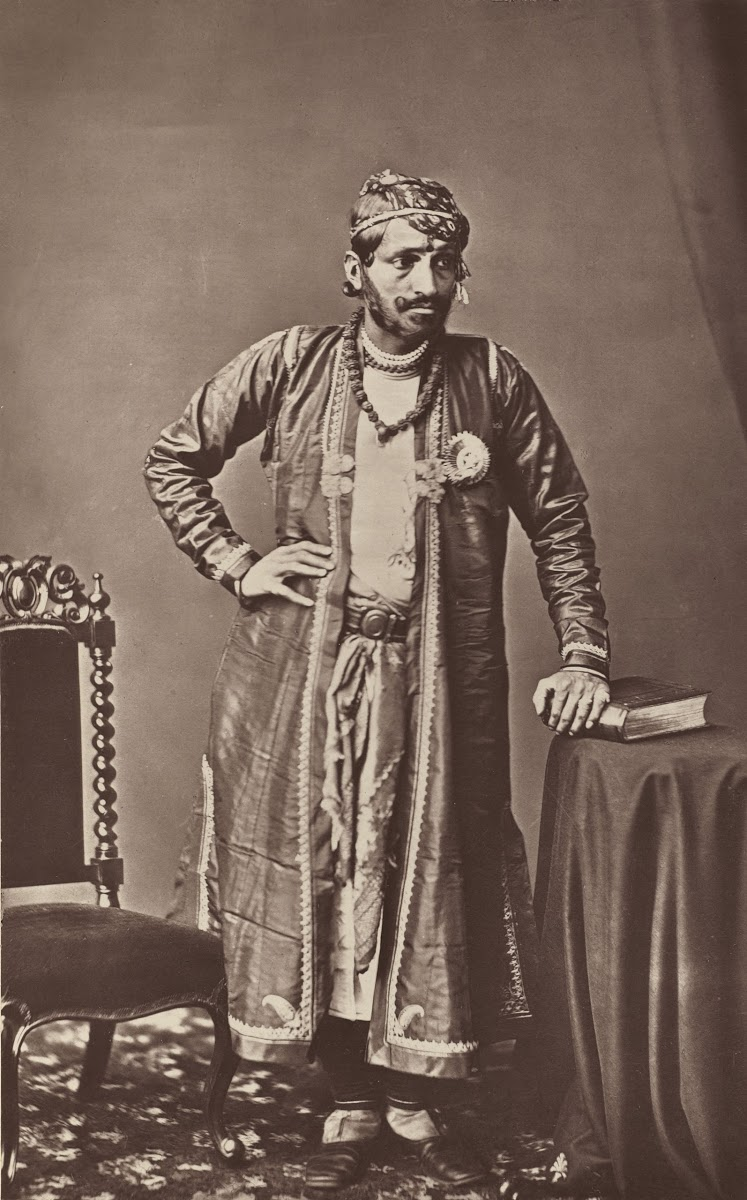
Ram Singh II

Upon the regent’s death in 1838, the kingdom came under direct supervision of successive British political agents. Various laws were framed in this duration. In 1839, regular revenue-related civil courts, or Adalat Diwani, as well as criminal courts, or Adalat Faujdari, were established for Jaipur state. In 1840, the state was divided into fresh administrative zones, districts, and parganas. Other administrative, judicial and social reforms were introduced. Infanticide was outlawed, and slavery abolished. In addition, certain other administrative institutions were streamlined. It was also during the minority of Sawai Ram Singh II that the state of Jaipur banned the practice of sati by law in 1846.

When Sawai Ran Singh II turned major, he introduced more reforms. During the 1854-55 period, four new departments of police, medical, education, and survey & settlement were set up, each under a separate administrator. The state’s administrative units were re-organised into five districts or sub-areas, each placed under a nazim.

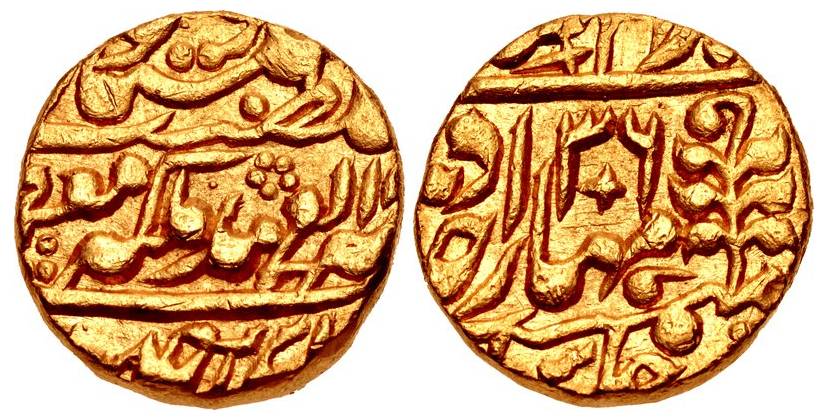
Coinage of Jaipur under Ram Singh II. In the name of Victoria, Queen of Great Britain and Empress of India. Sawai Jaipur mint.

Ram Singh placed due importance on education too. Maharaja’s College was established in 1844. By 1867 its first batch had taken the matriculation examination from Calcutta University, by 1873 it had been raised to the ‘Intermediate’ level, and by 1875 its original forty students had grown to eight hundred. The Maharaja established a Sanskrit College too, and in 1861 a school for Rajput boys. In 1866-67 an art and craft centre, ‘Maharaja’s School of Art and Crafts’ and established at Jaipur city in 1857.

The state later became well-governed and prosperous. During the Indian rebellion of 1857, when the British invoked the treaty to request assistance in the suppression of rebellious sepoys, the Maharaja opted to preserve his treaty, and thus sent in troops to help to subdue the uprisings in the area around Gurgaon.

In 1869, Ram Singh II signed a treaty with the British Government to lease the Sambhar Lake for 2.75 Lakh rupees annually. This treaty was further expanded in 1879 according to which any indigenous production of salt in Jaipur would be suppressed in exchange for tax free import and export of salt.

Sawai Ram Singh II died in 1881 without an heir and was succeeded by the Thakur of Isarda, Qayam Singh who ascended to the throne as Sawai Madho Singh II.

Jaipur state had a revenue of Rs.65,00,000 in 1901, making it the wealthiest princely state in Rajputana.

Jaipur's last princely ruler signed the accession to the Indian Union on 7 April 1949.

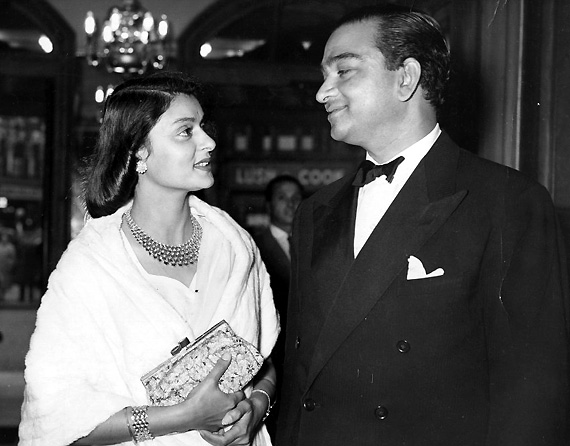
Gayatri Devi, Maharani of Jaipur, born as Princess Gayatri of Cooch Behar, with her husband Man Singh II, the last ruling Maharaja of Jaipur State.

Padmanabh Singh is the current head of the erstwhile royal family that once ruled Jaipur. Estimates of the royal family's wealth vary, but Singh is estimated to control a fortune of between $697 million and $2.8 billion.

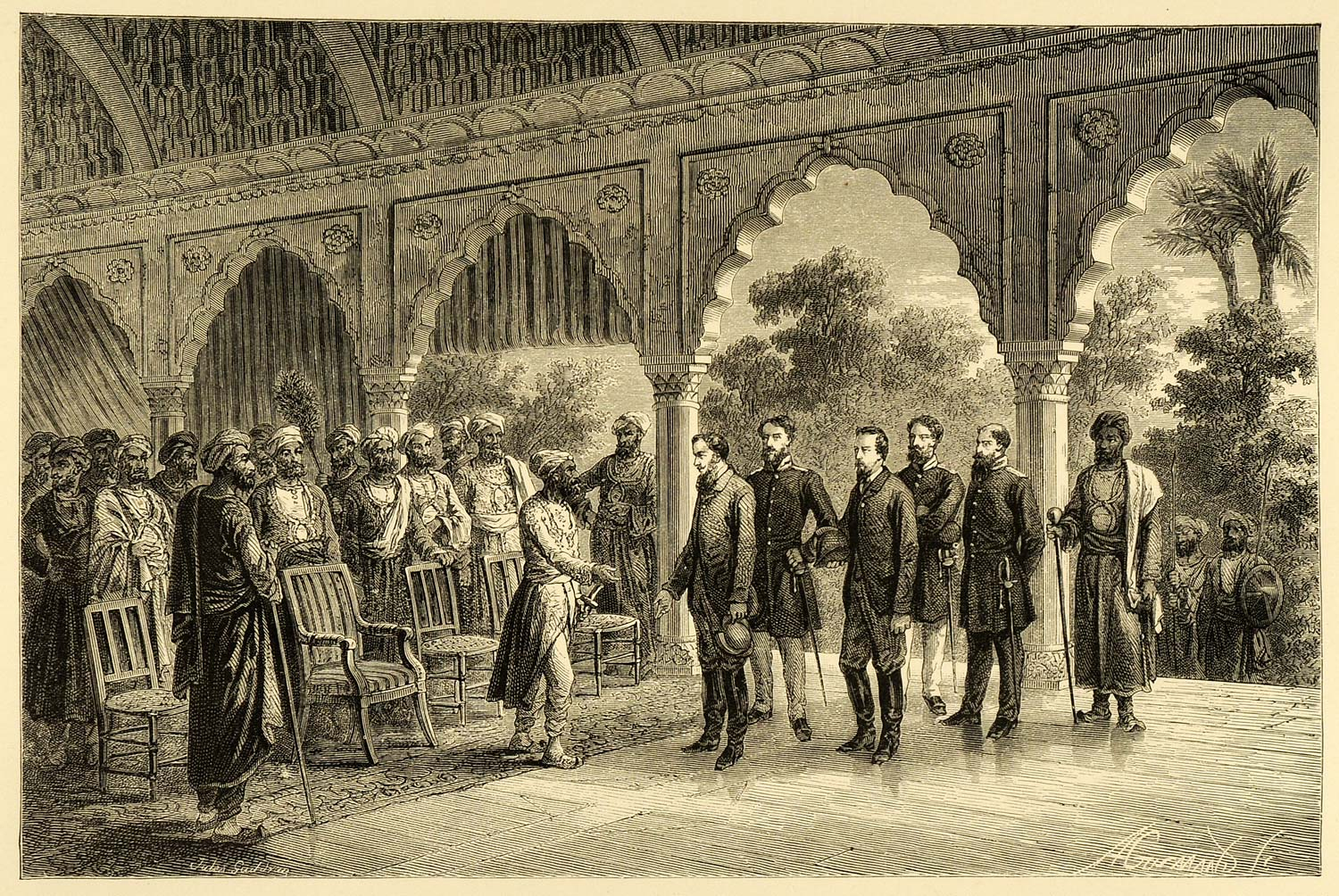
"First interview with the Maharajah of Jeypore," from 'India and its Native Princes' by Louis Rousselet, 1878

== List of rulers ==
=== Rulers of Ambers and Jaipur ===
Ruler	Reign		Lifespan	0 days
Ruler	Start	End	Lifespan	0 days
Raja Sodh Dev	27 December 966	15 December 1006	(d. 1006)	39 years, 353 days
Raja 'Dulha Rai'	15 December 1006	28 November 1036	(d. 1036)	29 years, 349 days
Raja Kakil Dev	28 November 1036	20 April 1039	(d. 1039)	2 years, 143 days
Raja Hanu Dev	21 April 1039	28 October 1053	(d. 1053)	14 years, 190 days
Raja Janhad Dev	28 October 1053	21 March 1070	(d. 1070)	16 years, 144 days
Raja Pajawan Dev	22 March 1070	20 May 1094	(d. 1094)	24 years, 59 days
Raja Malesi Dev	20 May 1094	15 February 1146	(d. 1146)	51 years, 271 days
Raja Vijal Dev	15 February 1146	25 July 1179	(d. 1179)	33 years, 160 days
Raja Raj Dev	25 July 1179	16 December 1216	(d. 1216)	37 years, 144 days
Raja Kilhan Dev	16 December 1216	18 October 1276	(d. 1276)	59 years, 307 days (Note: Longest serving monarch of the kingdom of Amber)
Raja Kuntal Dev	18 October 1276	23 January 1317	(d. 1317)	40 years, 97 days
Raja Johnsi Dev	23 January 1317	6 November 1366	(d. 1366)	49 years, 287 days
Raja Udaikaran	6 November 1366	11 February 1388	(d. 1388)	21 years, 97 days
Raja Narsingh	11 February 1388	16 August 1428	(d. 1428)	40 years, 187 days
Raja Banbir	16 August 1428	20 September 1439	(d. 1439)	11 years, 35 days
Raja Udharan	20 September 1439	10 December 1467	(d. 1467)	28 years, 81 days
Raja Chandra Sen	10 December 1467	17 January 1503	(d. 1503)	35 years, 38 days
Raja Prithviraj Singh I	17 January 1503	4 November 1527	(d. 1527)	24 years, 291 days
Raja Puranmal	4 November 1527	19 January 1534	(d. 1534)	6 years, 76 days
Raja Bhim Singh	19 January 1534	22 July 1537	(d. 1537)	3 years, 184 days
Raja Ratan Singh	22 July 1537	15 May 1548	(d. 1548)	10 years, 298 days
Raja Askaran	15 May 1548	1 June 1548	(d. 1599)	17 days
Raja Bharmal	1 June 1548	27 January 1574	(b. 1499 - d. 1574)	25 years, 240 days
Raja Bhagwant Das	27 January 1574	4 December 1589	(b. 1527 – d. 1589)	15 years, 311 days
Mirza Raja Man Singh I	4 December 1589	6 July 1614	(b. 1550 – d. 1614)	24 years, 214 days
Mirza Raja Bhau Singh	6 July 1614	13 December 1621	(b. 1576 - d. 1621)	7 years, 160 days
Mirza Raja Jai Singh I	13 December 1621	28 August 1667	(b. 1611 – d. 1667)	45 years, 258 days
Mirza Raja Ram Singh I	10 September 1667	30 April 1688	(b. 1629 – d. 1688)	20 years, 233 days
Raja Bishan Singh	30 April 1688	19 December 1699	(b. 1672 – d. 1699)	11 years, 233 days
Maharaja Sawai Jai Singh II	19 December 1699	21 September 1743	(b. 1688 – d. 1743)	43 years, 276 days
Maharaja Sawai Ishwari Singh	21 September 1743	12 December 1750	(b. 1721 – d. 1750)	7 years, 82 days
Maharaja Sawai Madho Singh I	12 December 1750	5 March 1768	(b. 1728 – d. 1768)	17 years, 84 days
Maharaja Sawai Prithvi Singh II	5 March 1768	13 April 1778	(b. 1762 – d. 1778)	10 years, 39 days
Maharaja Sawai Pratap Singh	1778	1803	(b. 1764 – d. 1803)	25 years, 364 days
Maharaja Sawai Jagat Singh II	1803	21 November 1818	(b. 1784 – d. 1818)	15 years, 324 days
Mohan Singh (regent)	22 December 1818	25 April 1819		124 days
Maharaja Sawai Jai Singh III	25 April 1819	6 February 1835	(b. 1819 – d. 1835)	15 years, 287 days
HH Maharaja Sawai Sir Ram Singh II	6 February 1835	18 September 1880	(b. 1833 – d. 1880)	45 years, 225 days
HH Maharaja Sawai Sir Madho Singh II	18 September 1880	7 September 1922	(b. 1862 – d. 1922)	41 years, 354 days
HH Maharaja Sir Sawai Man Singh II	7 September 1922	7 April 1949	(b. 1911 – d. 1970)	26 years, 212 days

Sawai Man Singh II merged Jaipur State in Union of India in the year 1949 .

=== Titular rulers of Jaipur ===
The titular (Note: In 1948, after India's independence and the state's accession to the Dominion of India under terms agreed to during the Political integration of India, Sawai Man Singh II was granted a privy purse, certain privileges, and the use of the title Maharaja of Jaipur by the Government of India.) rulers of the Jaipur State includes:

- 7 April 1949 – 24 June 1970: Maharaja Sawai Man Singh II
- 24 June 1970 – 28 December 1971: Maharaja Sawai Bhawani Singh

=== Other family members ===
- Diya Kumari
- Bhawani Singh
- Padmanabh Singh

== Jaipur Residency ==
The Jaipur Residency was established in the year 1821. It included the states of Jaipur, Kishangarh and an estate of Lawa. The latter had belonged to the Haroti-Tonk Agency until 1867.

== See also ==
- History of Jaipur
- Jaipur
- Jaipur State Railway

== Bibliography ==
- Rima Hooja (2006). A history of Rajasthan. Rupa & Co. ISBN 9788129108906. OCLC 80362053. Archived from the original on 4 April 2023.
