= Puranmal =

Raja of Amber from 1527 to 1534

- Raja

Raja of Amber
- Reign: 4 November 1527 – 19 January 1534
- Predecessor: Prithviraj Singh I
- Successor: Bhim Singh
- Died: 19 January 1534
- Spouse: Sister of Rao Maldev of Marwar
- Issue: Suja
- Dynasty: Kachhwaha
- Father: Prithviraj Singh I

Puranmal (died 19 January 1534) was a sixteenth-century Rajput ruler of Amber.

== Life ==
Puranmal ascended to the throne after his father's death, Prithviraj Singh I, in 1527. His succession was likely based on the fact that his mother, a daughter of Rao Lunkaran of Bikaner, was Prithviraj's favourite wife. (Note: Other sources state Puranmal's mother had been Prithviraj's Tonwar wife.) However, his ascension was controversial and led to conflicts within the Kachwahas. This internal strife allowed neighbouring rulers to take advantage of the situation. It was during these circumstances that Mughal emperor Humayun is said to have provided support to Puranmal.

Later, some sources state that Puranmal took a submission policy regarding the Mughals and fought alongside them, thus initiating the long relationship between Amber and the Mughal empire. According to the Akbarnama, Puranmal died in the Battle of Mandrail in 1534, while fighting under Humayun's brother Hindal Mirza against Tatar Khan. However, other sources disagree with this, instead stating that it was Hindal he was battling against when he was killed. This is said to have resulted from the Mughal prince making incursions into the territory of Puranmal's kinsman, Raimal, for whom the Raja died fighting in the Battle of Anaseri. Yet another version states that Puranmal was overthrown by his brother, Bhim Singh, who subsequently seized the throne.

Regardless, it was Bhim Singh who succeeded Puranmal, rather than the latter's sons. (Note: His son Suja, an infant at the time of his father's death, later made an attempt to claim the throne with the aid of Humayun's son-in-law, Mirza Sharafuddin.) His descendants later formed the Puranmalot sub-clan, one of the "twelve chambers" of the House of Kachwaha.
