= Prithviraj Singh I =

Raja of Amber from 1503 to 1527

Prithviraj
- Raja
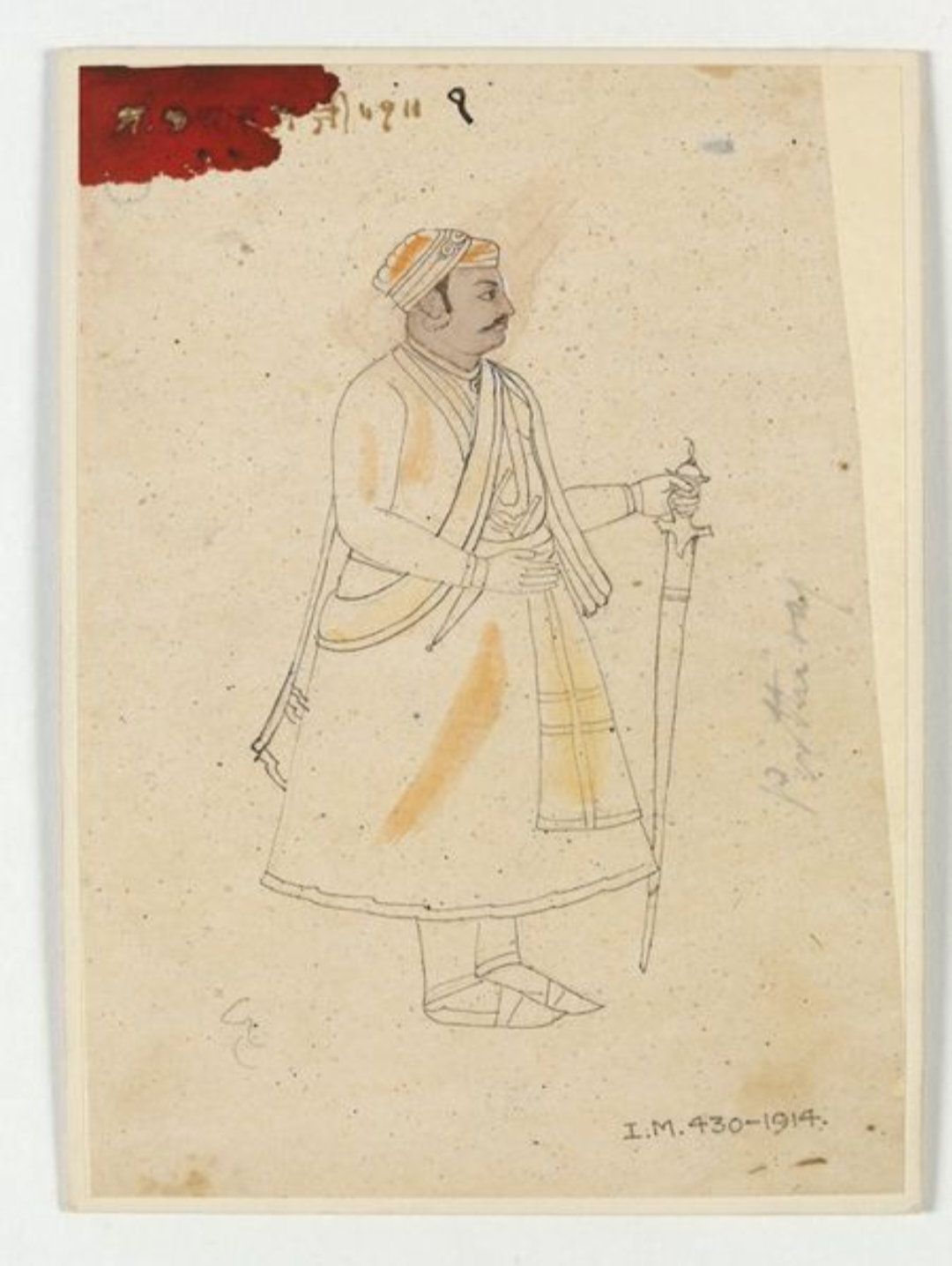
- Imaginary portrait of Prithviraj Singh I

Raja of Amber
- Reign: 17 January 1503 – 4 November 1527
- Predecessor: Chandrasen
- Successor: Puranmal
- Died: 4 November 1527
- Wives: Apurva Devi (Bala Bai) of Bikaner; Princess of Mewar
- Issue: Puranmal; Bhim Singh; Bharmal
- Dynasty: Kachhwaha
- Father: Chandrasen

Prithviraj Singh I (died 4 November 1527), also known as Prithvi Singh I, was a 16th-century Rajput ruler of Amber. He was a monarch of strong religious inclinations and during his reign, Amber became increasingly politically active. He took part in the Rajput alliance against the Mughal emperor Babur, fighting against the latter in the Battle of Khanwa alongside Rana Sanga of Mewar in 1527.

Three of Prithviraj's sons successively followed him as ruler of Amber, with many of his descendants also populating the kingdom's highest aristocracy in subsequent centuries. He fought many battles along side Rana sanga, and defeated Gujrat and malwa sultanates, and made mahmud khilji a prisoner for 6 months in the chittor fort, he also defeated Afghans in battle of khatoli/ghatoli, and battle of dholpur, in which Afghan army was slaughtered mercilessly by Rajput swords, He also defeated mughals in the battle of Bayana.

== Reign ==
Prithviraj ascended the throne of Amber after the death of his father, Raja Chandrasen, in 1503. With his rule, Amber, which had been experiencing a long period of stagnation, was revitalised, entering an era of extensive political activity. This may be shown through his marriage to a Mewari princess, to whose house the rajas of Amber owed homage.

Prithviraj was a fervent devotee of the Hindu deity Krishna, taking as his spiritual teacher an ascetic who took the name Krishna-das (slave of Krishna). This guru bestowed on the Raja two sacred idols; Narasimha, which has a temple in Amber, and Sitaram, which has one in Jaipur. The latter idol was from then on carried at the head of the Amber army in battle. At one point, Prithviraj made a pilgrimage to Dwarka, where he was initiated as a monk in the monastery.

In March 1527, he, alongside his son Jagmal and a number of relations, fought under Rana Sanga of Mewar in the Battle of Khanwa against the Mughal emperor Babur. This was the last of the great battles fought by the Rajputs, during which Sanga was debilitated after being struck by an arrow. Prithviraj, alongside Rao Maldev of Marwar and Rao Akheraj of Sirohi, escorted the injured Sanga to safety.

== Death ==
Prithviraj did not long survive after the battle, dying on 4 November 1527, two months before Rana Sanga's death. Like the latter, who was poisoned by his nobles in order to avoid further conflict with Babur, historian V.S Bhatnagar suggests that Prithviraj's death may also have been unnatural, noting that his successors later readily offered their allegiance to the Mughals.

== Family ==
Prithviraj had nine wives from multiple clans, by whom he had eighteen sons and three daughters. Twelve of these sons reached adulthood, with three eventually became rajas of Amber: Puranmal, Bhim Singh and Bharmal. (Note: Bhim Singh and Bharmal were both sons of Prithviraj's Rathore queen, Bala Bai, daughter of Rao Lunkaran of Bikaner. Puranmal's mother may also have been this woman, though other identifications include her being Prithviraj's Tonwar wife.) Nine of his sons, alongside three collateral relations, were also awarded estates in perpetuity for them and their descendants. These families are termed the baro kotri (twelve chambers) of the House of Kachwaha, who later formed the highest aristocracy of Jaipur.
