= Lunkaran =

Rao of Bikaner from 1505 to 1526

- Rao

Rao of Bikaner
- Reign: 23 January 1505 – 30 March 1526
- Predecessor: Nara
- Successor: Jait Singh
- Born: 12 January 1470; Deshnoke (in present-day Bikaner district, Rajasthan, India)
- Died: 30 March 1526 (aged 56); Dhosi (in present-day Jhunjhunu district, Rajasthan, India)
- Spouse: Daughter of Raimal, Rana of Mewar (m. 1514)
- Issue: Jait Singh; Several others
- Dynasty: Rathore
- Father: Bika
- Mother: Rang Kanwar of Pugal

Lunkaran (12 January 1470 – 30 March 1526) was the third Rao of Bikaner, ruling from 1505 to 1526. He spent much of his two-decade long reign consolidating and expanding the territories of his relatively new kingdom.

== Background ==
Lunkaran was born on 12 January 1470, a younger son of Rao Bika, the eponymous founder of the kingdom of Bikaner. His mother, Bhatiyani Rani Rang Kanwar, was the daughter of Rao Shekha, the Bhati ruler of Pugal.

== Reign ==
In January 1505, Lunkaran ascended the throne at the age of 35 following the premature death of his elder brother Nara. His first military engagement was the suppression of nobles who, after having lost lands under Bika, had revolted during the reign of Nara. Later, in 1509, he marched against Man Singh Chauhan of Dardrewa, defeating him after a siege of seven months and absorbing his lands. In 1512, he invaded Fatehpur, which was being ruled by the Kayam Khani king Daulat Khan. Taking advantage of a feud between Khan and another ruler, Lunkaran swept into the region and annexed 120 villages. The following year, he defeated the Khanzada ruler of Nagaur in battle and also conquered extensive territory from Chayal Rajputs near Hisar and Sirsa.

In early 1526, he became involved in a dispute with Rawal Jait Singh of Jaisalmer. Allegedly, the contention arose when Jait Singh insulted Lunkaran's clan, the Rathores, publicly in court. When chided by a noble visiting from Bikaner, the Rawal mocked them further by stating that he would bestow to the Brahmins of his kingdom as much land as the Rathors could ride over. When the noble reported the exchange to Lunkaran, he took up the challenge and, with his riders, invaded the Rawal's territory. His forces penetrated as far as the city of Jaisalmer itself and laid siege to it, capturing Jait Singh in the process. He only lifted the siege and released the captive king after the latter pledged to give his daughter in marriage to one of Lunkaran's sons.

== Death ==
In March that same year, Lunkaran and three of his sons rode into battle against the Nawab of Narnaul. However, while fighting in the village of Dhosi, several of his supporters withdrew from the battle. As a result of this, the Bikaner forces were overwhelmed, with Lunkaran, his sons, and his purohit Devidas being killed. He was succeeded on the throne by his son Jait Singh.

== Issue ==
=== Sons ===
- Ratan Singh – ancestor of the chiefs of Mahajan
- Jait Singh, Rao of Bikaner
- Pratap Singh (killed in Narnaul)
- Barsi (killed in Narnaul)
- Tejsi
- Netasi (killed in Narnaul)
- Kishan Singh
- Ram Singh
- Suraj Mal
- Kushal Singh
- Roop Singh
- Karamsi

=== Daughters ===
- Apurva Devi (Bala Bai): married Prithviraj Singh I, Raja of Amber
- Unnamed daughter: married Nahar Khan, Kayam Khani ruler of Fatehpur (son of Daulat Khan)

== Ancestry ==
Ancestors of Lunkaran

8. Ranmal, Rao of Marwar
4. Jodha, Rao of Marwar
9. Kodamde Bhatiyani of Pugal
2. Bika, Roa of Bikaner
10. Jaits Sankhala of Roon
5. Navaranga De Sankhli of Roon
1. Lunkaran, Rao of Bikaner
12. Bairsal, Rao of Pugal
6. Shekha, Rao of Pugal
3. Rang Kanwar Bhatiyani of Pugal
