= Chetak =

Horse of Maharana Pratap

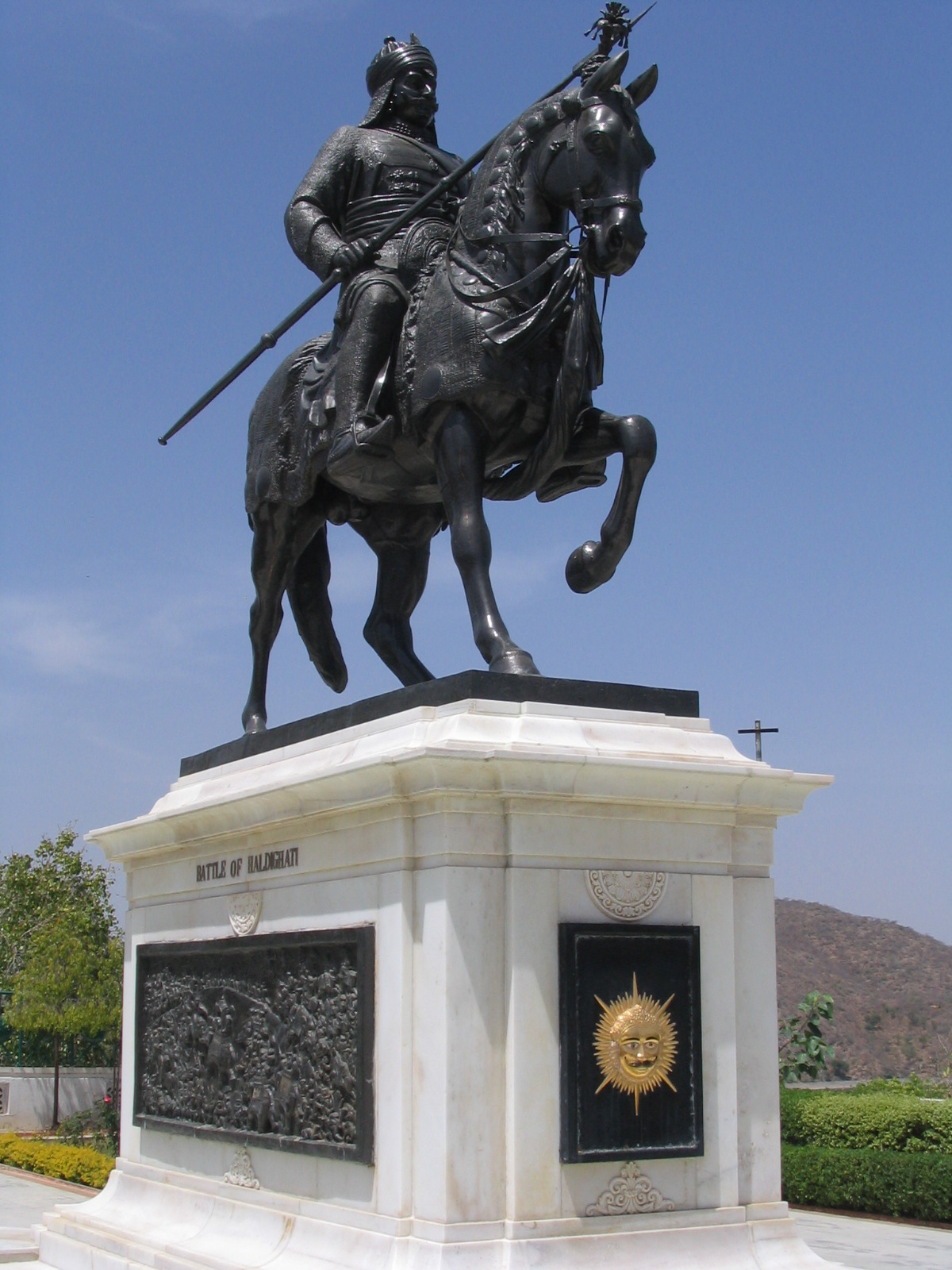
- Maharana Pratap on Chetak, commemorative statue in Moti Magri Park, Udaipur
- Species: Horse, Equus ferus caballus
- Sex: male
- Died: June 1576; Rajsamand, Rajasthan
- Nationality: Kingdom of Mewar
- Owner: Maharana Pratap

Chetak or Cetak is the name given in traditional literature to the horse ridden by Maharana Pratap at the Battle of Haldighati, fought on 18 June 1576 at Haldighati, in the Aravalli Mountains of Rajasthan, in western India.

== The story ==
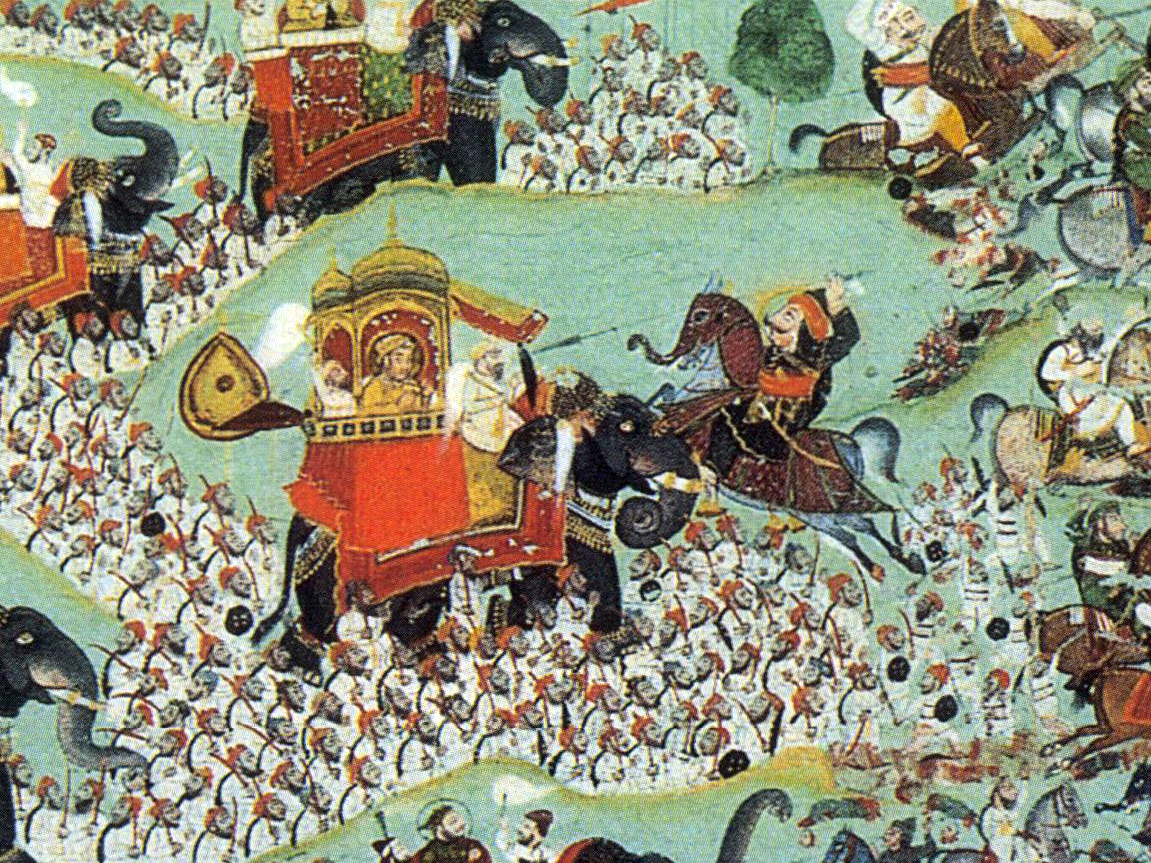
Detail from Battle of Haldighati by Chokha of Devgarh, 1822, showing the attack by Pratap, mounted on Chetak, on the leader of the Mughal forces, Man Singh of Amber, who is in a howdah on an elephant

Historical sources do not name the horse ridden by Maharana Pratap at the Battle of Haldighati on 18 June 1576, nor do they attribute any unusual feat or achievement to it.

According to tradition, the horse was called Chetak. Although wounded, Chetak carried Pratap safely away from the battle, but then died of his wounds. The story is recounted in court poems of Mewar from the seventeenth century onwards. The horse is first named Cetak in an eighteenth-century ballad, Khummana-Raso. The story was published in 1829 by Lieutenant-Colonel James Tod, a colonial officer who had been political officer to the Mewari court, in the first volume of his Annals and Antiquities of Rajast'han or the Central and Western Rajpoot States of India. His account was based on the Khummana-Raso, and became the most commonly followed version of the tale. In it, the horse is named Chytuc, and is once referred to as the "blue horse". Pratap is at one point called the "rider of the blue horse".

The story spread beyond Rajasthan, to Bengal and elsewhere. There, Pratap was seen as a symbol of resistance against invasion and, by extension, of nationalist resistance to British colonial occupation.

== Commemoration ==
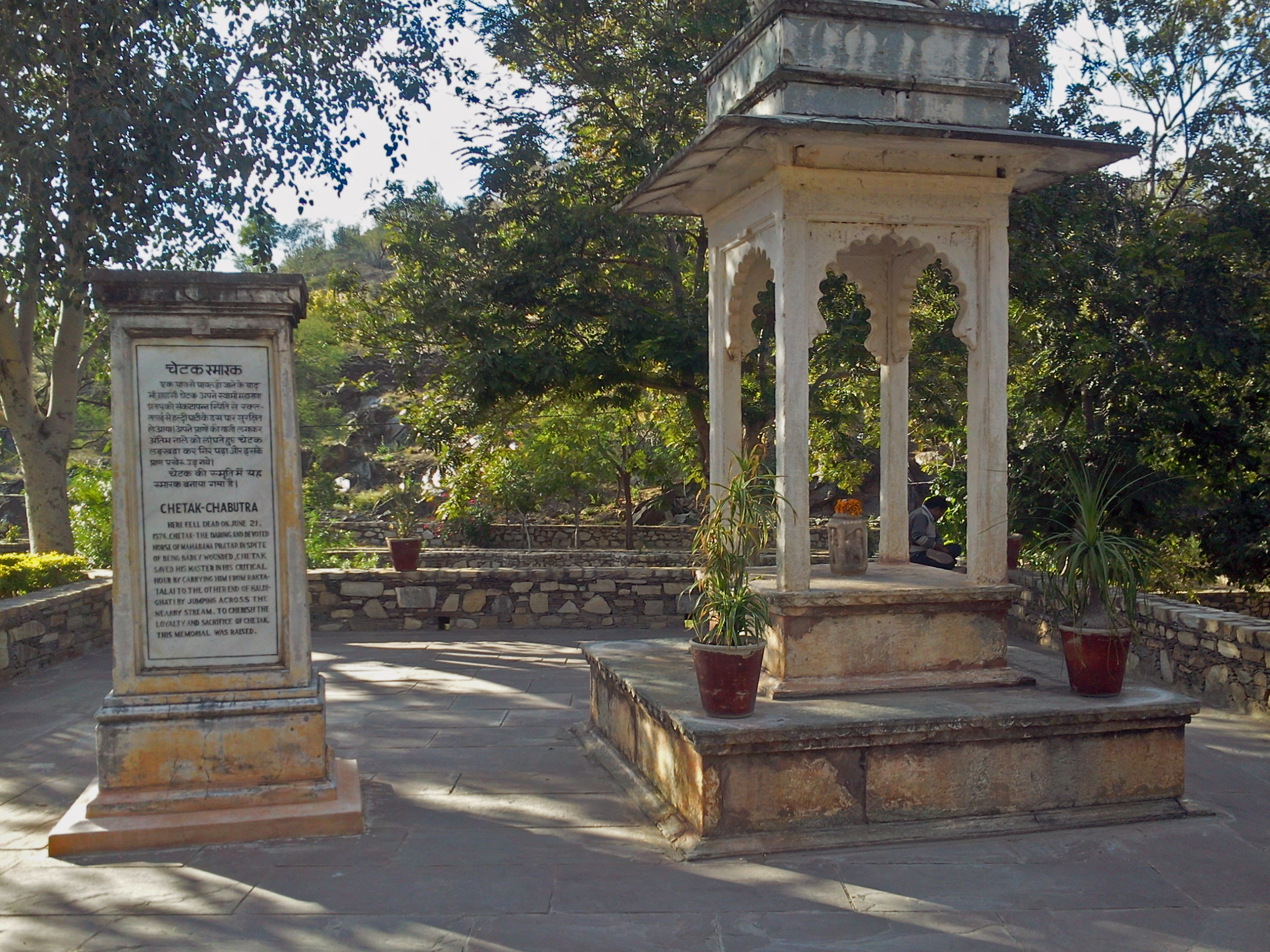
The Chetak Smarak at Haldighati

Several statues and monuments to Pratap and Chetak have been raised. An equestrian statue was placed in Moti Magri Park in Udaipur by Bhagwant Singh of Mewar (r. 1955–1984); another overlooks the city of Jodhpur. The Chetak Smarak at Haldighati in Rajsamand District marks the spot where Chetak supposedly fell.
