= Hakim Khan Suri =

Afghan commander in the Battle of Haldighati (d. 1576)

- Born: 16th century Delhi (attributed)
- Died: 18 June 1576; Haldighati, Kingdom of Mewar (present-day Rajasthan, India)
- Burial place: Khamnor/Rakht Talai, near Haldighati
- Relatives: Associated with the Sur dynasty
- Military career
- Allegiance: Kingdom of Mewar
- Branch: Afghan contingent in Mewar service
- Service years: fl. 1576
- Rank: Commander
- Commands: Vanguard of Maharana Pratap’s army
- Known for: Participation in the Mughal–Mewar conflict (1576)
- Conflicts: Battle of Haldighati †

Hakim Khan Suri (died 18 June 1576) was a military commander associated with the Sur dynasty who fought on the side of Maharana Pratap of Mewar against the Mughal Empire. He commanded an Afghan contingent in the vanguard of Pratap’s forces during the Battle of Haldighati, fought on 18 June 1576 in the Aravalli region of present-day Rajasthan.

The battle took place after diplomatic efforts by Mughal emperor Akbar to secure Pratap’s submission failed, leading to a military confrontation between the Mughal army under Man Singh I of Amber and the forces of Mewar. Although the Mughals secured the battlefield, Maharana Pratap continued his resistance through guerrilla warfare. Hakim Khan Suri was killed in the fighting and is remembered in regional tradition as a commander who fought alongside Pratap.

== Early life and background ==
Hakim Khan Suri’s early life are poorly documented in contemporary primary sources. Later regional histories and modern secondary works describe him as an Afghan (Pathan) commander associated with remnants of the Sur dynasty that had opposed Mughal expansion after the mid-16th century.

== Role in Mewar and the Battle of Haldighati ==
In the campaign of 1576, Hakim Khan Suri entered the service of Maharana Pratap and is recorded in historical accounts as leading the Afghan/Pathan contingent in the vanguard of Pratap's forces at Haldighati.

Modern historians identify Hakim Khan as a leading commander on the Mewar side and note that he was killed during the fighting on or about 18 June 1576.

== Death and immediate aftermath ==
Hakim Khan Suri was killed in the Battle of Haldighati on 18 June 1576 while leading his contingent against the Mughal forces. Khan was beheaded during the fighting, and his head was buried at Khamnor, while his body was interred at Rakhtalai, both near the battlefield at Haldighati, where memorial sites have been noted and visited by locals. These sites attract visitors during annual commemorations such as Maharana Pratap’s anniversary and Shaheedi Divas, when floral tributes are offered at his grave.

Some regional histories describe Hakim Khan Suri as an Afghan Pathan commander (Senapati) in Maharana Pratap’s army, highlighting that the conflict was between invaders and defenders of Mewar rather than along religious lines.

== Legacy ==
Hakim Khan Suri is remembered in Mewar’s regional memory as a commander who fought for Maharana Pratap. A memorial near Haldighati is associated with him and is visited during commemorative observances.

The Maharana Mewar Foundation has instituted a Hakim Khan Sur Award as part of its honours programme drawing upon Mewar’s historical figures.

== In popular culture ==
- He was portrayed by Nirbhay Wadhwa in the television series Bharat Ka Veer Putra – Maharana Pratap (2013–2015).
