= Sinclairs Hotels Limited =

Indian Hotel Chain

Sinclairs Hotels Limited.
- Type: Public
- Traded as: BSE: 523023
- Industry: Hospitality
- Founded: 1971
- Headquarters: Kolkata, India
- Area served: Siliguri; Burdwan; Darjeeling; Dooars; Kalimpong; Ooty; Port Blair; Gangtok; Udaipur; Haldighati
- Key people: Navin Suchanti (chairman); Dr. Niren Suchanti (director)
- Revenue: Rs303 million (2021-22)
- Website: www.sinclairshotels.com

Sinclairs Hotels Ltd. operates in the hospitality sector and runs a chain of hotels and resorts. The company owns nine properties in India at Ooty, Burdwan, Siliguri, Darjeeling, Kalimpong, Dooars, Port Blair, Gangtok, Udaipur, and Haldighati.

== History and growth ==
The company was founded in 1971 as a private limited company by a local entrepreneur from Kolkata. The first hotel was set up in Siliguri in the year 1976. The next hotel was started in Darjeeling in 1981. The company made a public issue in the year 1986 and its shares were listed in Bombay Stock Exchange and Calcutta Stock Exchange. In 1990, Dr Niren Suchanti and Navin Suchanti acquired majority control of the company. Navin Suchanti is the chairman and Dr Niren Suchanti is the director of the company.

Thereafter, the company acquired a hotel in Port Blair in 1991 and another one in Ooty in 1995. In 1999, it commissioned a resort property Sinclairs Retreat Dooars in Chalsa in the Dooars region of West Bengal, India.

In 2011, it acquired a majority stake in Savannah Hotels Pvt Ltd, which owns a 104-room hotel in Whitefield, Bengaluru. In 2013, the company divested its investment in Savannah Hotels.

In 2014, Sinclairs commissioned its resort Sinclairs Retreat Kalimpong (46 rooms and 2 suites), in Kalimpong spread over an area of 5 acres.

In 2015, Sinclairs commissioned its 4 acre resort in Burdwan, Sinclairs Tourist Resort Burdwan.

In 2020, Sinclairs launched its 8th property at Gangtok, Sikkim (60 rooms and suites) with an area of 45,000 sq. ft.

In 2021, Sinclairs Hotels signed an agreement to acquire on lease an 18-room property in Yangang, Sikkim. This boutique hotel in South Sikkim is the ninth property under the brand Sinclairs.

In 2022, Seven properties of Sinclairs Hotels were awarded with TripAdvisor Travellers’ Choice Award on the basis of quality and quantity of traveller reviews and ratings.

== Sinclairs Retreat, Ooty ==
At 8,000 feet (2.43 km) above sea level, the Sinclairs Retreat Ooty is the highest-located resort in South India. Due to the elevation and geography, Ooty has one of the most stable climates in all of India, with temperatures remaining cool year round, with an average yearly high around 20 °C (68 °F). in 2019, the Sinclairs Retreat Ooty was adjudged a winner of TripAdvisor's 2019 Travellers’ Choice Award, marking it as being in the top 1% of hotels worldwide according to reviews. The retreat features three restaurants, including a Spanish-themed bar and eatery, six event spaces ranging from ballrooms to scenic gardens and five styles of accommodation.

== Sinclairs Retreat Kalimpong ==
Opened in 2015, the Sinclair Retreat Kalimpong is situated on five acres of land overlooking the Himalayas. The hotel features 48 rooms and suites including a steam-treated wooden cabin and loft apartments, each with a fireplace, balcony and garden, three restaurants and three function rooms. In 2018 the Sinclairs Retreat Kalimpong received the Booking.com Guest Review Award, averaging a user rating of 8.5 out of 10.

== Sinclairs Bayview Port Blair ==
The Bayview is the only hotel in Port Blair to offer views of the Bay of Bengal from almost every room. Located on the Andaman Islands, an archipelago in the Bay of Bengal between India and Myanmar, the islands were occupied by Japanese forces for a short while during WWII. As such, the Sinclairs Bayview is built around a real Japanese bunker that patrons can explore. The hotel features 46 rooms, four restaurants and one function room. In 2016 the Sinclairs Bayview was ranked as the number one hotel in Port Blair by TripAdvisor.com.
