= Bhau Singh =

Raja of Amber from 1614 to 1621

- Raja of Amber
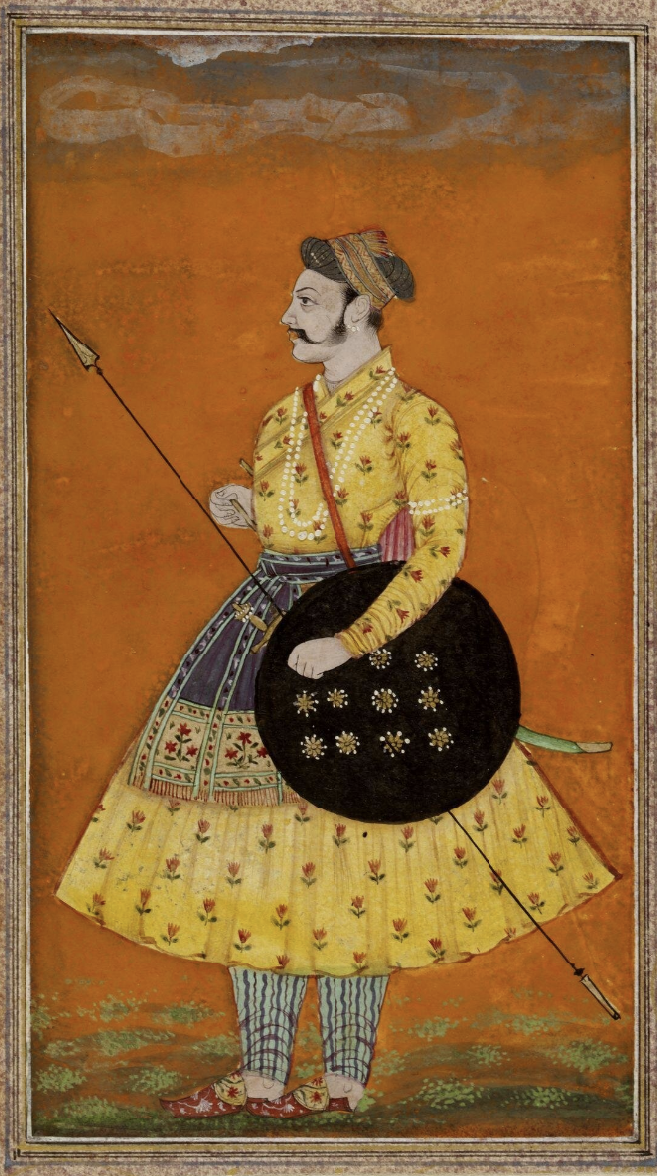
- Portrait of Raja Bhau Singh from Golconda c.1675

26th Raja of Amber
- Reign: 6 July 1614 – 13 December 1621
- Predecessor: Man Singh I
- Successor: Jai Singh I
- Born: c.1577
- Died: 13 December 1621 (aged 43–44); Burhanpur, Khandesh Subah Mughal Empire (modern-day Madhya Pradesh, India)
- Spouse: Askumwar Bai (daughter of Sur Singh of Marwar)
- Issue: Suraj De (married Gaj Singh of Marwar); Rupkumwar
- Dynasty: Kachhwaha
- Father: Man Singh I
- Mother: Rani Sahodra Gaud

Bhau Singh (c.1577 – 13 December 1621) was a Mughal nobleman as well as the Raja of Amber.

== Life ==
Bhau Singh was a younger son of Man Singh I, Raja of Amber, born of Rani Sahodra Gaud, daughter of Raimal. He had one full brother named Durjan Singh. Prior to his accession to the throne, Bhau Singh had been posted in Bengal, working alongside the Deputy Subedar of the region.

Following the death of his father in 1614, Hindu custom dictated that Maha Singh, the son of Bhau Singh's late elder brother Jagat Singh, inherit the throne. However, the Mughal emperor Jahangir overruled this and instead bestowed the crown of Amber on Bhau Singh. The former, who had a close relationship with the new Raja, justified this decision by declaring that he was "the most capable of Man Singh's sons". Maha Singh was given the rule of the lands of Garha (present-day Jabalpur) as consolation for his loss.

Upon his accession, Jahangir initially raised Bhau Singh's mansab to 3000, then to 4000 the following year, before finally promoting him to a commander of 5000 in March 1617. However, when the Emperor dispatched him to the Deccan to serve in the campaign against Malik Amber, Bhau Singh only served as a subordinate captain, in contrast to the supreme commands previously enjoyed by his father and grandfather. The languid manner and poor management of the campaign, combined with the bafflement of Mughal officers when faced with Malik Amber's guerrilla tactics, prevented Bhau Singh from having any substantial achievements in this role.

This inactive and inglorious life appears to have caused a deep melancholy in the Raja, who turned to drinking in response. Following a sojourn to the Mughal royal court, he returned to the Deccan where, in December 1621, he suddenly fainted. His health now debilitated due to alcoholism, Bhau Singh did not regain consciousness and died a day later at the age of 44. Having not had sons, Jahangir appointed as Bhau Singh's successor his great-nephew Jai Singh I, the son of Maha Singh, the latter having died some years earlier under similar circumstances.
