= Moti Magri =

- town
- Location in Rajasthan, India Moti Magri (India)
- Coordinates: 24°35′54″N 73°40′59″E
- Country: India
- State: Rajasthan
- District: Udaipur

Languages
  - Official: Hindi
- Time zone: UTC+5:30 (IST)
- Nearest city: Udaipur

Moti Magri ("Pearl Hill") is a hill in India. It overlooks the Fateh Sagar Lake in the city of Udaipur, Rajasthan.

Atop the Moti Magri or Pearl Hill is a bronze statue memorial of the Rajput hero Maharana Pratap, depicting him astride his favourite horse "Chetak".

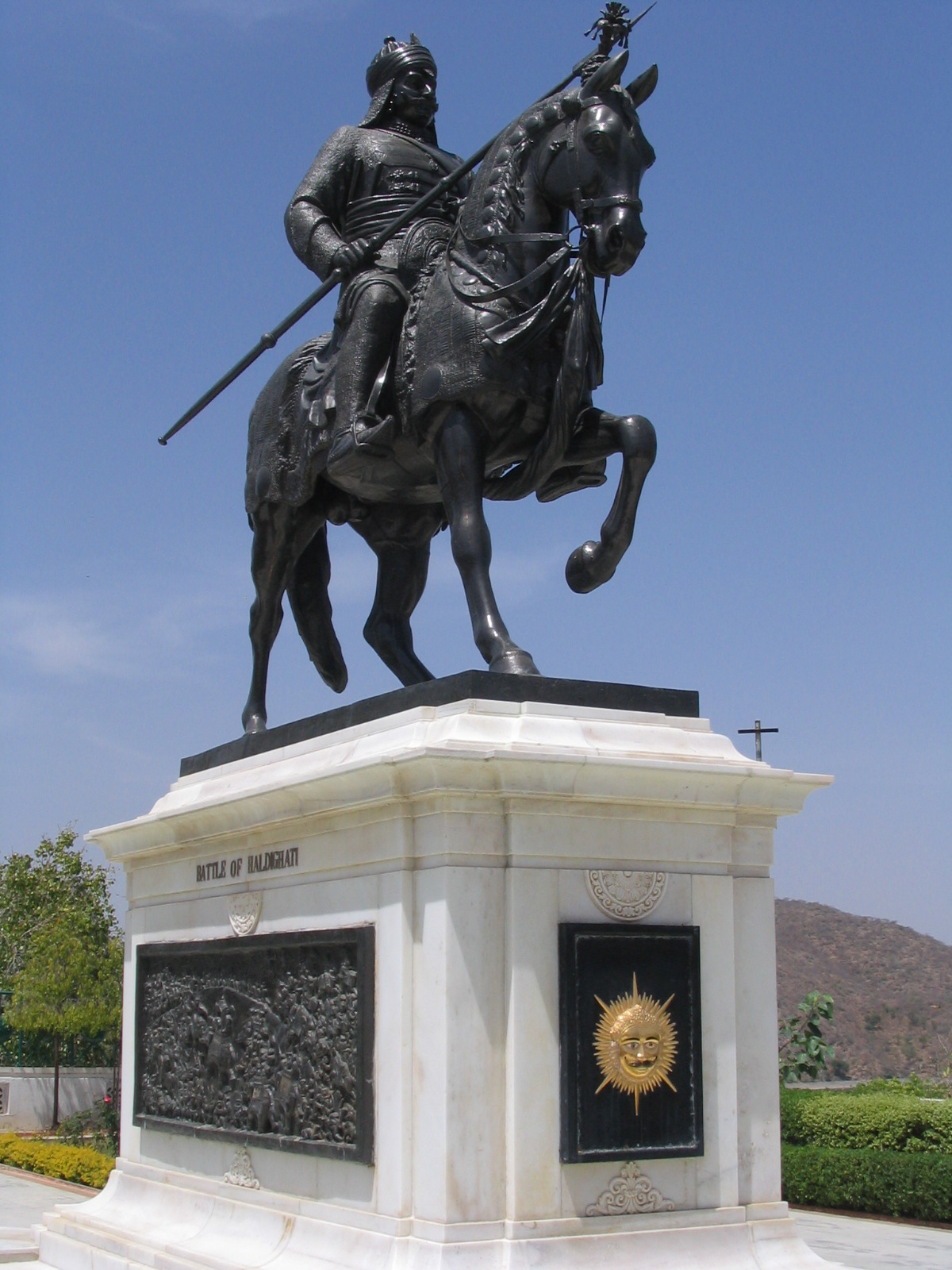
Statue of Maharana Pratap of Mewar, commemorating the Battle of Haldighati.

== Geography ==
It is located near the Fateh Sagar Lake on a small hillock.

== History ==
Maharana Pratap Memorial was initiated in theby Pratap Sabha Maharana Bhupal Singh of Mewar and completed with the help of a public trust.
