= Chetak Smarak =

Memorial in Rajasthan, India

Coordinates: 24.886743°N 73.6912707°E

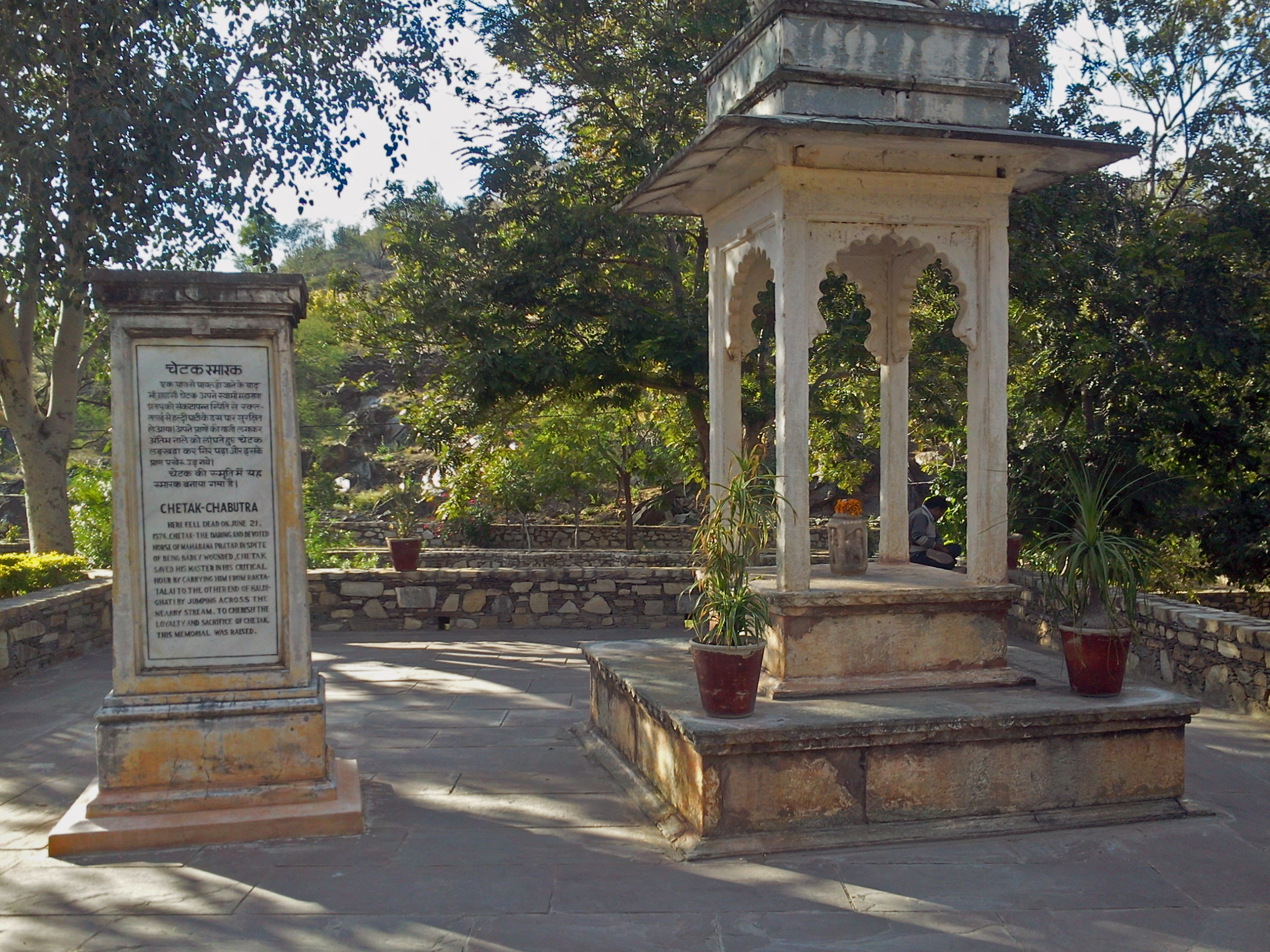
- Memorial to the horse Chetak
- Interactive map of Chetak Smarak
- Location: Balicha, Rajsamand district, Rajasthan, India
- Type: Memorial
- Dedicated to: Maharana Pratap's horse Chetak

Chetak Smarak, also called Chetak Samadhi, is a memorial to Maharana Pratap's famed steed Chetak, in the Indian state of Rajasthan. The horse died of battle wounds after helping the Rana effect a miraculous escape from the Battle of Haldighati. The memorial is said to have been built at the spot that Chetak died.

It is situated in the Aravalli hills in the lake district of Rajsamand, at the village of Balicha. In 2003, the shrine was declared a Monument of National Importance in Rajasthan by the Archaeological Survey of India.

It is an interesting little place with an old museum dedicated to the battle, and a new one coming up close by. It can be reached easily by road, about 4 km from the temple town of Nathdwara.
