= Haldighati =

Site of battle between Mewar army and Mughal army in 1576

Coordinates: 24.8921711°N 73.6978065°E

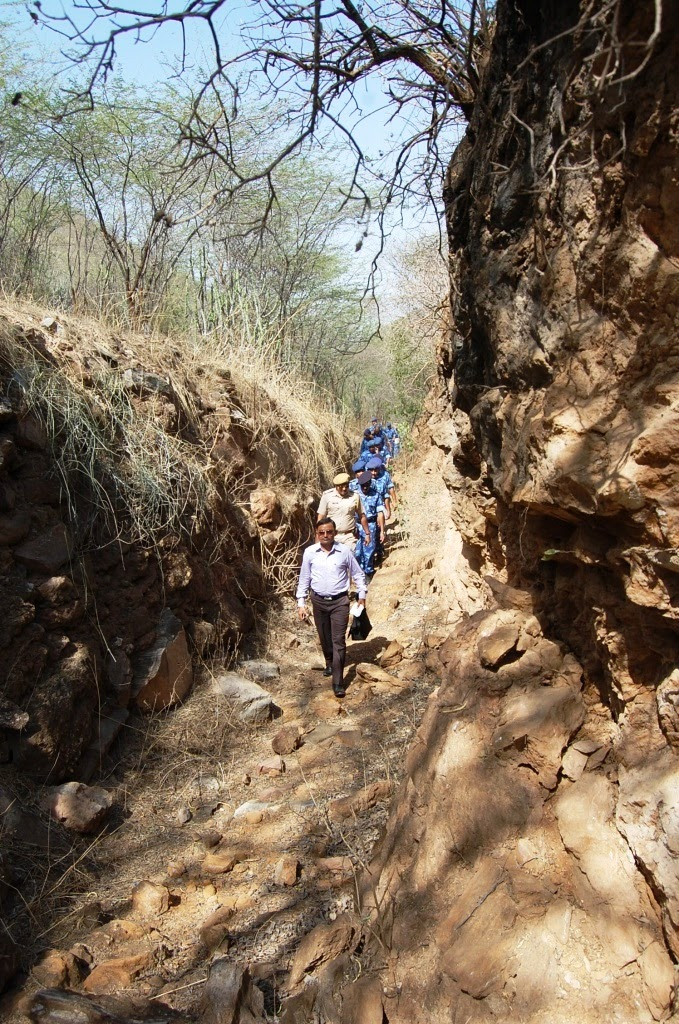
- The turmeric-coloured soil of the pass
- Interactive map of Haldighati
- Elevation: 1,227.03 ft (374.00 m)

Third Approach
- Location: Rajsamand district, Rajasthan, India
- Range: Aravalli

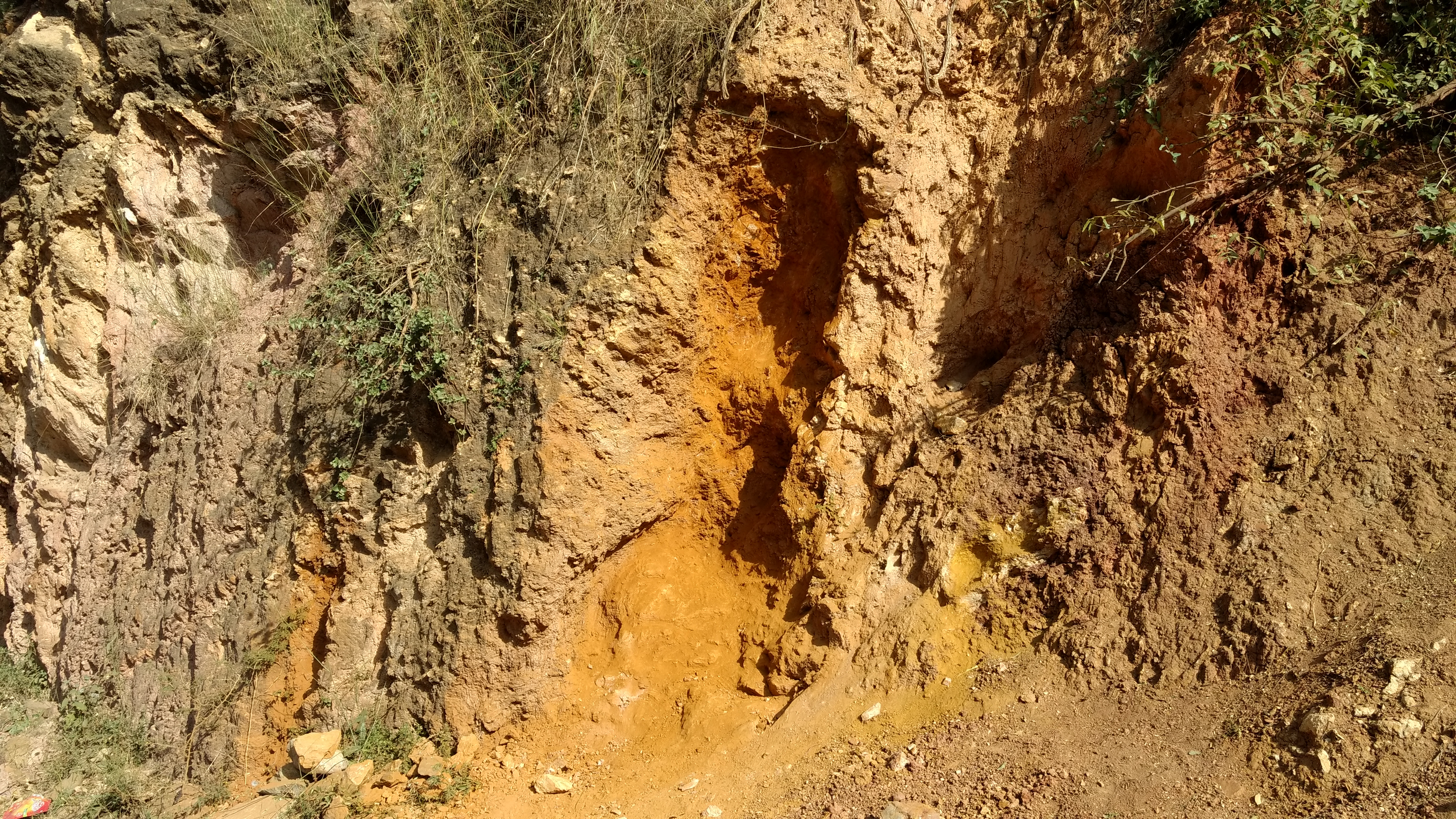
Turmeric colour soil in Haldigthati Pass

Haldighati is a historical mountain pass between Khamnore and Balicha village situated at Aravalli Range of Rajasthan in western India which connects Rajsamand and Udaipur districts. Haldighati is also known as Haldighati Darra.The pass is located at a distance of 44 kilometres from Udaipur and 367 kilometres from Jaipur. The name 'Haldighati' is believed to have originated from the turmeric-coloured yellow soil of the area. (Turmeric is haldi in Hindi).

== History ==
The mountain pass is a significant historical location. Rakt Talai in Khamnore is the site of the Battle of Haldighati, which took place in 18 June 1576 between of the Kingdom of Mewar and the Mughal Army led by Kunwar Man Singh. Maharana Pratap led the armed forces of Mewar against the Mughals who fought under the command of Mughal emperor Akbar's general Man Singh I of Amber.

== Memorial ==
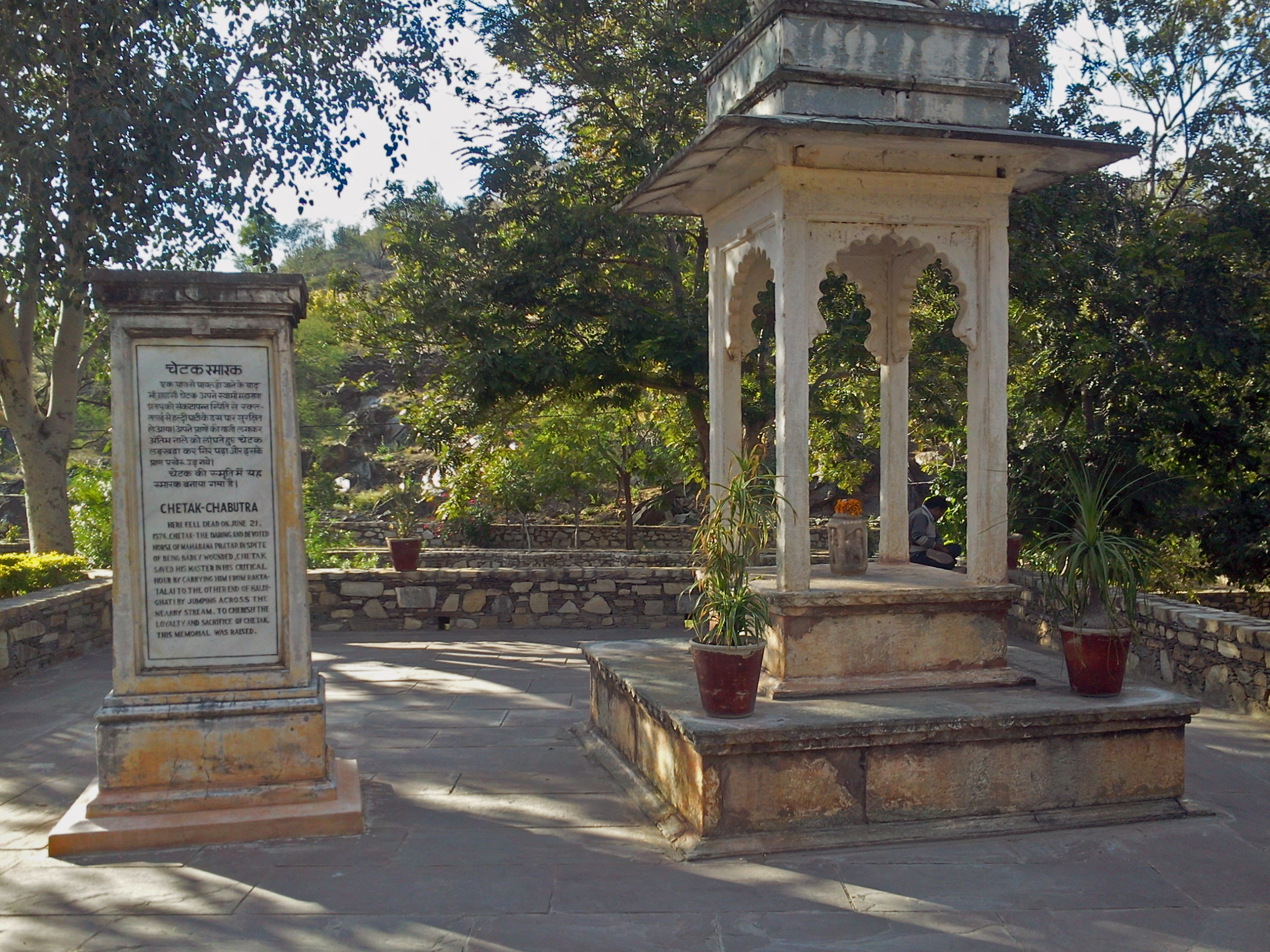
The Chetak Samadhi at Haldighati

Maharana Pratap's horse Chetak played a pivotal role in the Battle of Haldighati. Chetak was fatally wounded in this battle and died on 18 June 1576. Maharana Pratap erected a small monument for his horse at the place where Chetak fell down. The cenotaph still exists at Haldighati.

The Government of India commissioned the construction of Maharana Pratap National Memorial in the year 1997, and in June 2009 the monument was finally opened. The memorial features a bronze statue of the Maharana astride Chetak. Although it is still waiting for announcement as National Monument.

== Tourism ==
Haldighati is also known for its charity rose product and the mud art of Molela. Much emphasis is being laid for promoting a private cottage industry by the Department of Tourism.
