= Balicha =

Coordinates: 24°21′N 74°15′E

- Village
- Interactive map of Balicha
- Country: India
- State: Rajasthan
- District: Udaipur

Languages
  - Official: Hindi
- Time zone: UTC+5:30 (IST)

Balicha is a village located near Udaipur, in Rajasthan, India. It is the location of the future permanent campus of Indian Institute of Management Udaipur. The memorial site Chetak Smarak is also located there.
