= Bhamashah Yojana =

Government scheme in Rajasthan

- Location: Ajmer
- State: Rajasthan
- Launched: 15 August 2014
- Website: bhamashah.rajasthan.gov.in

Bhamashah Yojana is a scheme introduced by the Government of Rajasthan to transfer financial and non-financial benefits of governmental schemes directly to women recipients in a transparent way. The scheme was inaugurated by Chief Minister Vasundhara Raje on 15 August 2014. The aim of Bhamashah Yojana is to empower women. The empowerment of women is very important for a good society. The applicants can apply Online to avail of this Bhamasha Yojana. Also, they will get benefits from the scheme directly into bank accounts.

The scheme is named after the Bhamashah a famous minister, financier and general who helped Maharana Pratap.
