= Man Singh I =

Raja of Amber from 1589 to 1614

- Maharaja of Amber; Raja Raja
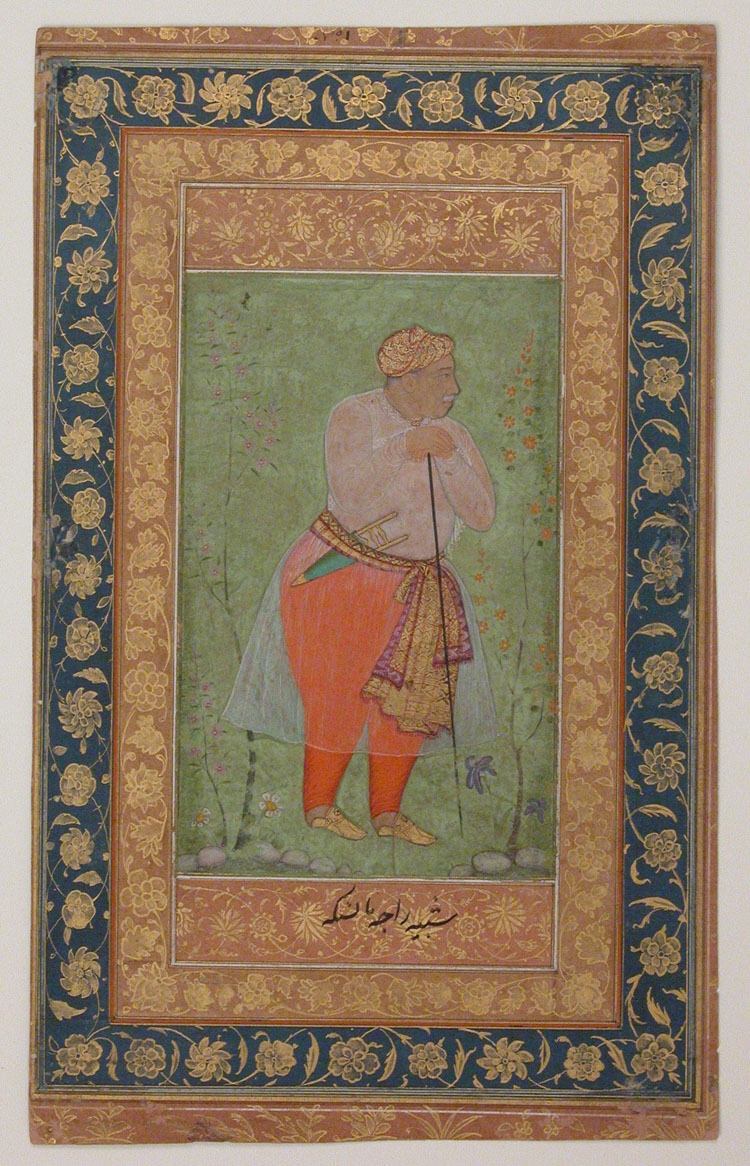
- Portrait of Man Singh, c. 1590

25th Raja of Amber
- Reign: 10 December 1589 – 6 July 1614
- Coronation: 10 December 1589
- Predecessor: Bhagwant Das
- Successor: Bhau Singh

Subahdar of Bihar
- Term: 1587–1594
- Emperor: Akbar I
- Successor: Saeed Khan Chaghta

9th Subahdar of Bengal
- Term: 9 November 1595 – 2 September 1606
- Emperor: Akbar I Jahangir
- Predecessor: Syed Khan
- Successor: Qutubuddin Khan

Subahdar of Kabul
- Term: 10 October 1585 –1586
- Emperor: Akbar I
- Predecessor: Mirza Muhammad Hakim
- Successor: Bhagwant Das
- Born: 21 December 1550; Amber, Amber Kingdom, Rajputana
- Died: 6 July 1614 (aged 63); Ellichpur, Berar Subah, Mughal Empire
- Spouse: Rathorji Shringar Deiji of Jaitaran in Marwar Khichanji Ram Deiji of Gagron Katochiji Maha Deiji of Kangra Gajapatiji Achrang Deiji of Bodana in Orissa Gaudji Sahodra Deiji of Maroth Yadavji Trilok Deiji of Karauli Narayaniji Lakhma Deiji of Cooch Behar Khichanji Amar Deiji of Gagron Rathorji Asha Deiji of Marwar Chauhanji Pratap Deiji of Bhadawar
- Issue among others...: Jagat Singh; Himmat Singh; Kushal Singh; Durjan Singh; Sabal Singh; Bhau Singh; Kalyan Das; Shyam Singh; Keshav Das; Atibal; Sagat Singh; Roop Deiji m.to Kunwar Harnarayan of Bundi; Badan Deiji (marriage not known); Madan Deiji m.to Raja Vikramaditya Singh Ju Dev of Rewa; Mukut Deiji (marriage not known); Ram Deiji m.to Rao Ratan Singh of Bundi
Names
- Mirza Raja Man Singh Kachawaha
- House: Kachhwaha
- Father: Bhagwant Das
- Mother: Parmarji Bhagwat Deiji d.of Rao Panchayan of Malpura in Amber
- Religion: Hinduism
- Military career
- Allegiance: Mughal Empire; Kingdom of Amber
- Service: Mughal Army
- Service years: 1562–1614
- Rank: Kunwar (1562–1589); Mansab (1598–1605); Mansabdar (1605–1614)
- Commands: Bengal; Kabul
- Conflicts: See list: Mughal conquest of Bengal; Siege of Kabul; Battle of Haldighati; Mughal conquest of Jessore; Mughal conquest of Bihar; Mughal conquest of Orissa

Raja Man Singh I (21 December 1550 – 6 July 1614) was the 24th Kachawaha ruler of the Kingdom of Amber from 1589 to 1614. For the Mughals, he also served as the foremost imperial Subahdar of Bihar Subah from 1587 to 1594, then for Bengal Subah for three terms from 1595 to 1606 and the Subahdar of Kabul Subah from 1585 to 1586. He served in the imperial Mughal Army under Emperor Akbar. Man Singh fought sixty-seven important battles in Kabul, Balkh, Bukhara, Bengal and Central and Southern India. He was well versed in the battle tactics of both the Rajputs as well as the Mughals. He is commonly considered to be one of the Navaratnas, or the nine (nava) gems (ratna) of the royal court of Akbar.

== Early life of Man Singh I ==
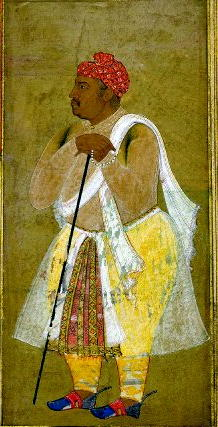
Portrait of Man Singh

He was the son of Raja Bhagwant Das and his wife Bhagawati of Amer. He was born on Sunday, 21 December 1550.

Initially known as Kunwar (prince), Man Singh received the title of Raja (King) and the rank mansab of 5000 after the death of his father on 10 December 1589 from Akbar. On 26 August 1605, Man Singh became a mansabdar of 7,000, i.e., a commander of 7,000 cavalry in the Mughal forces, which was the maximum command for anyone other than a son of the Mughal emperor and the guardian of Khusrau, the eldest son of Jahangir. He fought many important campaigns for Akbar. Kunwar Man Singh led the Mughal Army in the well-known battle of Haldighati fought in 1576 against the Kingdom of Mewar. He is also known for his reestablishment of Jagannath Temple of Puri, Orissa, construction of Kashi Vishwanath Temple, Varanasi.

== War against Mewar ==
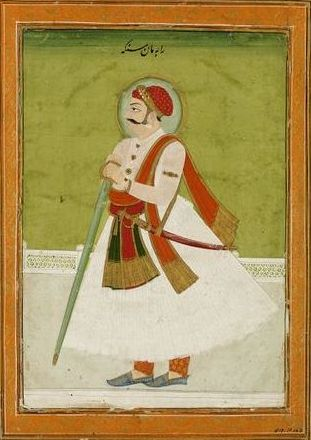
Portrait of Raja Man Singh c.1790

Man Singh was sent by Akbar to Maharana Pratap to make a treaty with Akbar and accept Mughal sovereignty. However Pratap refused, starting the Battle of Haldighati in 1576.

Pratap had 3,000 horsemen, elephants and 400 Bhil archers under Rana Poonja. A small artillery unit was also with him under Hakim Khan Sur. The force was divided into five wings. The advance wing was under Hakim Khan Sur, Bhim Singh Dodiya and Ramdas Rathore. The right wing was under Bhamashah and Maharaja Ramshah Tanwar. The left wing was under Jhala Man Singh. Rana Pratap was in the centre. Behind him was Rana Punja with his Bhil warriors.

Man Sing's Forces Consisted of 10,000 horsemen, infantry and some elephants. This included 4,000 Kachwaha Rajput forces. and 5,00 Mughal forces, out of which, 1,000 were other Hindu reserves, and 5,000 were Muslims.

This force was divided into five wings. There were two advance wings. The first was under Sayyid Hashim Barha, son of Sayyed Mahmud Khan, Jagannath Kachwaha and Asaf Ali Khan. The second advance troop was under Madho Singh Kachwaha. Behind this was Man Singh. To his right was Mulla Qazi Khan and to his left were Sayyeds of Barah. At first Rana Pratap attacked and scattered the advance and left wings of the Mughal army but soon momentum shifted with Mansingh's counter charge forced Pratap to retreat. Jagannath Kachwaha killed Ramshah Tanwar and Rajput warriors of both sides engaged in a fierce battle. The Mughals were the victors and inflicted significant casualties among the Mewaris but failed to capture Pratap, who escaped to the hills.

== Expedition to Kabul ==
In 1580 CE, some prominent Muslim officers of Akbar, displeased with his liberal religious policies, started to conspire against him. Qazi Muhammad Yazdi declared it the duty of every Muslim to rebel against Akbar. In Bihar and Bengal they declared Mirza Hakim, Akbar's stepbrother and Governor of Kabul, to be the emperor. Akbar sent armies to Bihar and Bengal to crush this rebellion, while he himself started towards Kabul; Man Singh with him. On 8 March 1581, Akbar reached Machhiwara and soon arrived on the banks of River Indus, he then sent an advance force led by Man Singh to Kabul. Although, Akbar's army was hesitating to cross the swelling Indus River, Man Singh was able to cross it first followed by troops. Hearing the news Mirza Hakim fled to Gurband. Following the army, Akbar himself arrived at Kabul on 10 August 1581. Hakim was pardoned by Akbar, but his sister Bakhtunissa Begum was appointed Governor of Kabul. After Akbar returned to Fatehpur Sikri; Bakhtunissa remained as the nominal head of state, while Hakim acted as the governor (Hakim died in July, 1582). Kabul was annexed by the Mughal Empire and Man Singh was appointed governor. He remained in Kabul for some years and built a fortress, used by succeeding Mughal governors. Man Singh brought many talented men with him when he returned from Kabul. Some of their descendants still live in Jaipur.

Again in 1585 CE, some Afghan tribes rose against the Mughal empire. The Yusufzai and "Mandar" tribes were the main ones among them. Akbar sent an army under Zain Khan, Hakim Abul Fateh and Raja Birbal to control these revolting tribes. However, they failed to control the revolting Afghans and Raja Birbal, friend of Akbar and one of his Navratnas was also killed in the battle with Afghans. Around 8,000-40,000 Mughal soldiers were also killed by the Afghans. Akbar then sent Raja Todar Mal to crush the revolt and called Raja Man Singh to help Todar Mal. Todarmal had some success in controlling the rebellious Afghan tribes, but the real source of the revolt was behind the Khyber Pass. It was hard to cross this pass which was dominated by Afghan "Kabailies". Man Singh was accompanied by "Rao Gopaldas" of Nindar in this expedition, who bravely made way for Mughal army in the pass. After crossing the pass, Man Singh entered Kabul and decisively defeated five major tribes of Afghans including Yusufzai and "Mandar" tribes, causing the massacre of 70,000-100,000 Afghans. The flag of Amber was changed from "Katchanar" (green climber in white base) to "Pachranga" (five colored) to commemorate this massive victory. This flag continued in use until accession of Jaipur state in India. This permanently crushed the revolt and the area remained peaceful thereafter.

In 1586 CE, Akbar sent another army under Raja Bhagwant Das, father of Kunwar Man Singh to win Kashmir. Kashmir was captured and annexed in the Mughal Empire and made a Sarkar (district) of Kabul province. Man Singh and his father Raja Bhagwant Das are reputed to have brought the technology of cannon production to Amber. Raja man singh lost his commander rao govind das in the war of kabul. Rao govind das was awarded the jagir of bhatton ki gali and chaparwada.

== Conquest of Bihar ==
When Akbar had conquered Delhi, many of his Afghan enemies had fled to the refuge of the eastern Raja's. Man Singh was sent by Emperor Akbar to bring the resisting Raja's to submission. Man Singh's first target was Raja Puranmal of Gidhaur whose fort was easily conquered by the Kachwaha army. Puranmals treasury was captured and his daughter was married to Man Singh's brother Chandrabhan Kachwaha. Man Singh continued his campaign and defeated the raja's of Gaya and Kargpur, both of them were forced into submission and paid tribute to the emperor. Some Afghan nobles of Bengal tried to invade Bihar during Man Singh's occupation, but were soundly defeated by Man Singh's son Jagat Singh. The invaders left their loot and fled back to Bengal, the spoils of war and 54 elephants were sent to the emperor. Abul Fazl has described Man Singh's campaign in Bihar in the following words. "The Raja united ability with courage and genius with strenuous action".

== Conquest of Orissa ==
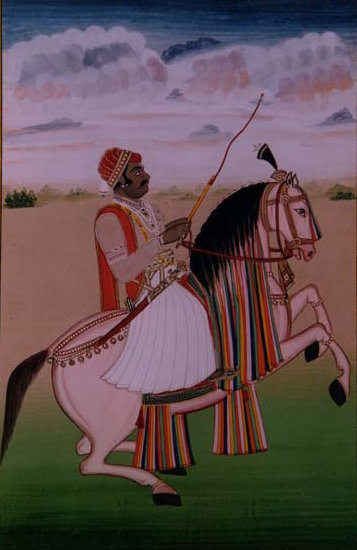
Man Singh I riding a Horse

After conquering Bihar, Man Singh was ordered to defeat the Afghan Sultan Qatlu Khan Lohani of Orissa. Man Singh set out for Orissa in April 1590. Jagat Singh Kachwaha was sent with an advance army to study the area, however he was attacked by Sultan Qatlu Khan and was badly defeated where several notable commanders of Amber were killed, including Bika Rathor, Narupal Charan and Mahesh Das. Jagat was saved by Bir Hambir and escaped to the Kingdom of Bishnupur. Qatlu however died after 10 days and the Afghans under his son Nasir Khan surrendered to Man Singh. Nasir bowed before Man Singh and promised to read the Khutba and stamp coins in the name of emperor Akbar. He further ceded lands and gave a tribute of 150 elephants. After this success, Man Singh returned to Bihar. The Afghans however rebelled against Nasir after his regent Isa Khan died. The Afghans captured the lands that had been ceded and started another rebellion. Man Singh was once again forced to march to Orissa. On 9 April 1592, the two armies met near Jaleswar city and after a bloody fight Man Singh defeated the Afghans, Man singh followed the fleeing Afghans and forced the Afghan leaders to accept Mughal overlordship. The remaining Afghan chieftains fled to the Hindu Raja's of Orissa. Man Singh attacked these Raja's and captured several forts with ease and forced them to surrender, the strongest of these Raja's, the Raja of Khurda however refused and was pressed by Man Singh, several of his cities and forts were captured after which the Khurda Raja shut himself in his capital fort. Akbar denounced this rough behaviour towards such an ancient dynasty and ordered Man singh to show leniency after which the Khurda Raja surrendered and offered his daughter to Man Singh in marriage. The conquest of Orissa was thus complete. Man Singh was called to Lahore where the crown prince Salim personally received him and he was given robes of condolence by the emperor for his father's death. Man Singh presented to the emperor three sons of Quatlu Khan Lohani and 2 nobles of Orissa.

== Governor of Bengal, Bihar, Jharkhand and Odisha ==
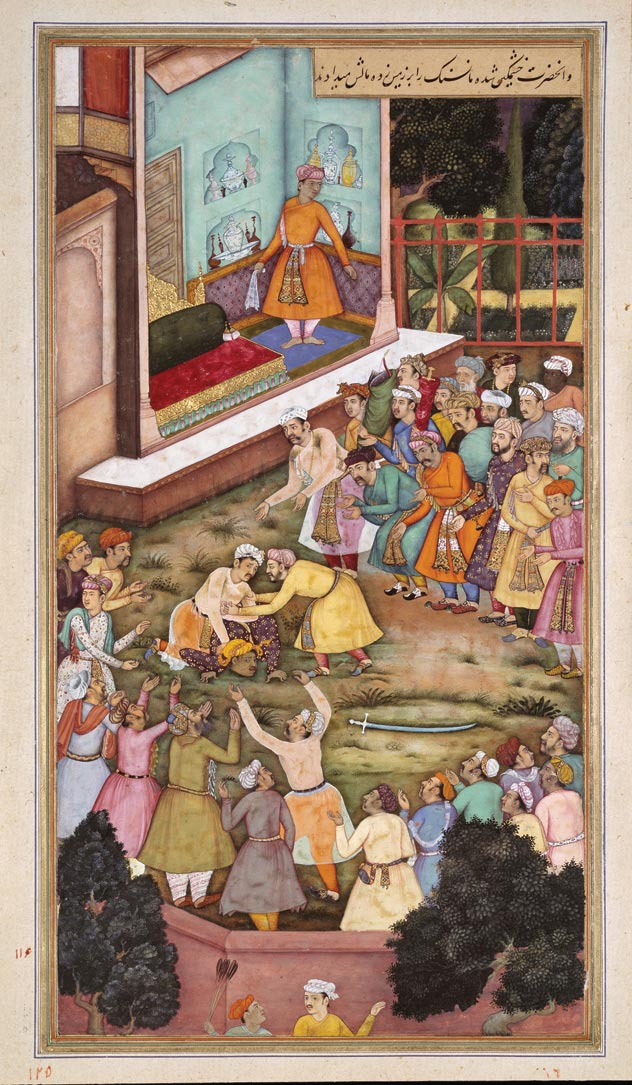
Akbar fights Man Singh.

On 17 March 1594, Man Singh was made the guardian of Prince Salim (Jehangir) by Akbar. He was also appointed as the viceroy of Bengal and many large jagirs in Orissa and Bengal were given to Man Singh and his nobles. Man Singh soon started sending his men to quell the rebellions in Bengal. On 2 April 1595, the Amber army conquered Bhushna fort. On 7 November, Man Singh founded a new capital for Bengal called Akbarnagar. After founding the new capital, Man personally marched against the Afghans under Isa Bhati, resulting in the retreat of the Afghans and the annexation of Isa's lands. Man Singh fell ill after this campaign, which renewed the rebellion. Man Singh sent Himmat Singh to deal with the rebels, and once again defeated them. Man Singh also helped Lakshmi Narayan, the raja of Cooch Behar, for which the grateful Raja of Cooch Behar gave his sister in marriage to Man Singh and also agreed to become a vassal of the Mughal Emperor. Man Singh would leave Bengal for Ajmer and during this period the Mughals started to lose control over Bengal and even lost several skirmishes. Man Singh was thus once again sent to Bengal. Man Singh defeated the rebels near Sherpur-Atia on 12 February 1601 and chased them for 8 miles. Man Singh, after this victory, marched towards Dacca and forced Kedar Rai, the zamindar of Bhushna, to submit to him. The rebels Jalal Khan and Qazi Mumin were also defeated by Man Singh's grandson. Man Singh then marched towards the Banar river where he defeated the successor of Qatlu Khan called Usman and quelled the Pathans under him. Man Singh would go on to defeat the Arracan Pirates and then Kedar Rai, who was captured after a battle and died before he could be brought before Man Singh. The Magh raja and Usman were also defeated after this battle. Man Singh thus returned to Dacca and camped at Nazirpur after a series of victories against the powerful rebels of Bengal.

== Jahangir and twilight of Man Singh I ==
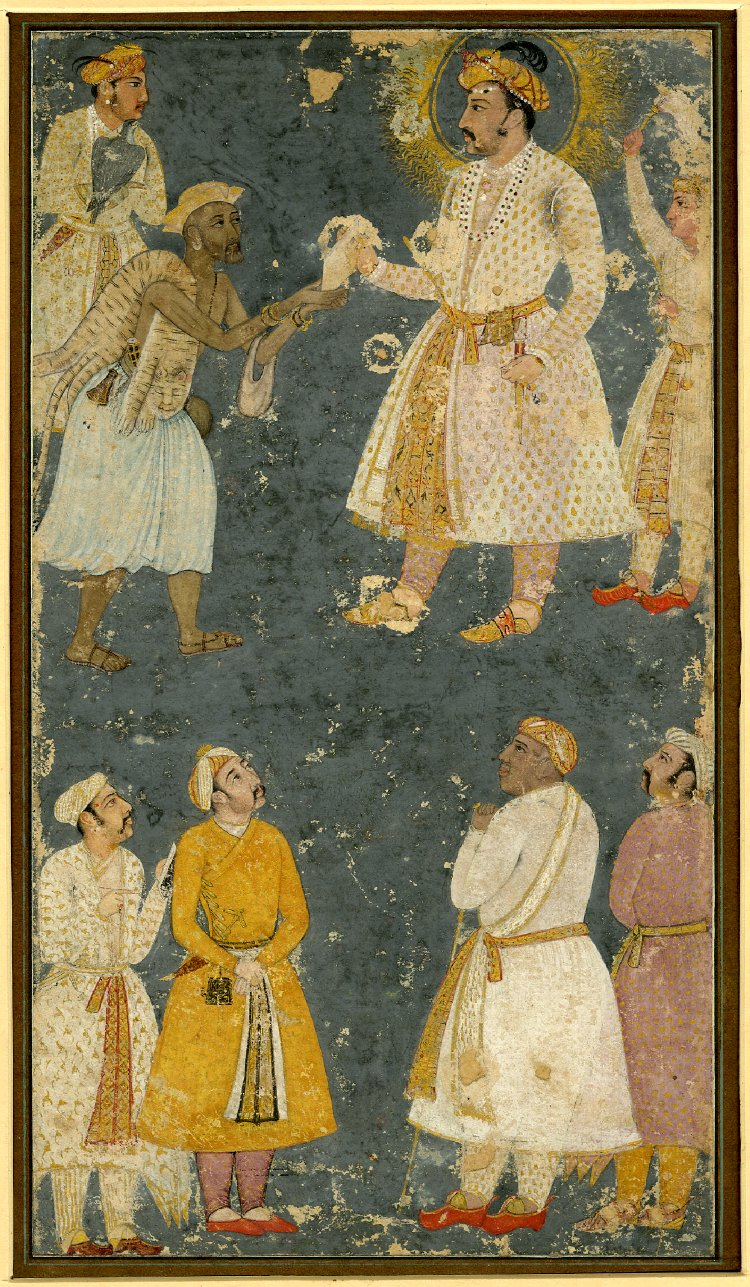
Man Singh (bottom right) witnesses Jahangir receiving a petition from a fakir c.17th century

Prince Salim was born, but he became addicted to alcohol and opium in his youth. He disobeyed royal orders and became infamous for torture such as murdering Abul Fazal. Akbar tried hard to reform him as well as his eldest son Khusrau Mirza. Two of Akbar's sons, Murad and Danial, died in his lifetime. The royal court was divided into two factions, one favoring Khusrau and the other Salim to be the next emperor. Raja Man Singh and Mirza Aziz Koka were in Khusrau's favour. In 1605, when Akbar fell ill, he appointed Salim to be his heir. Though Man Singh opposed Salim's accession to the throne during Akbar's lifetime, he never opposed Jahangir (Salim) after his coronation. After Akbar's death, Jahangir (Salim) became emperor. Man Singh was initially sent as Subahdar of Bengal on 10 November 1605 for a short period, but soon he was replaced by Qutb-ud-Din Khan Koka on 2 September 1606. Jahangir also ordered removal of some of the modifications which had been made by Raja Man Singh to his palace at Amber. But in 1611 CE, the southern provinces of Ahmednagar, Berar and Khandesh defied Mughal sovereignty under Malik Ambar. Jahangir sent Raja Man Singh and others to crush the revolt.

== Death and succession ==
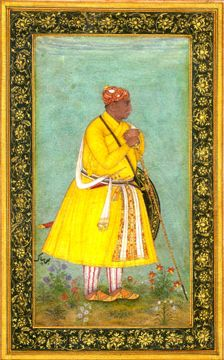
Mughal Painting of Man Singh I

Man Singh died a natural death on 6 July 1614 at Ellichpur. Following his death, he was succeeded by his son Mirza Raja Bhau Singh. His direct descendants are known (to this date) as the Rajawats who had the privilege to the throne of Amber and subsequently Jaipur.

== Cultural achievements ==
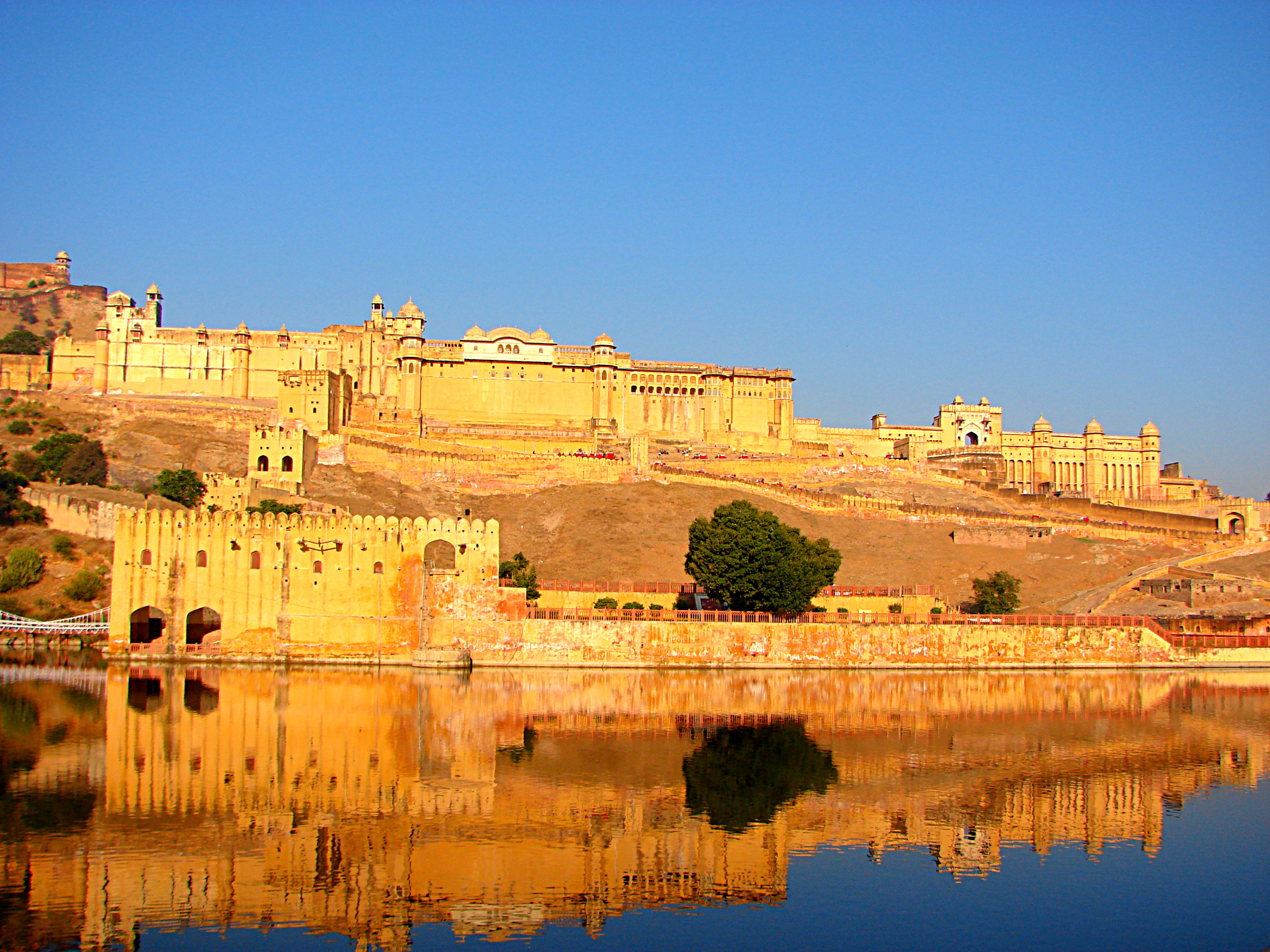
Amber Fort, built by Man Singh in 1592

Raja Man Singh was a devotee of the deity Krishna. He had a seven-storied temple of Krishna constructed for Rupa Goswami, disciple of Chaitanya Mahaprabhu, in Vrindavan. The cost of construction was one crore rupees at that time. The four-storey temple is still present at Vrindavan. He also constructed a temple of Krishna at his capital, Amber. The place is now known as "Kanak Vrindavan" near Amber Ghati of Jaipur. He constructed the temple of Shila Devi at Amber Fort. He also constructed and repaired many temples at Benaras, Allahabad and various other places. He added much beautification to his palace at Amber.It is believed his son Jagat Singh I received education from Tulsidas and Man Singh himself used to attend his religious lectures. Tulsidas was a contemporary of Akbar and author of Ramacharitamanasa, also known as the Tulasi Ramayana, and much other famous poetry devoted to Rama and Hanuman.

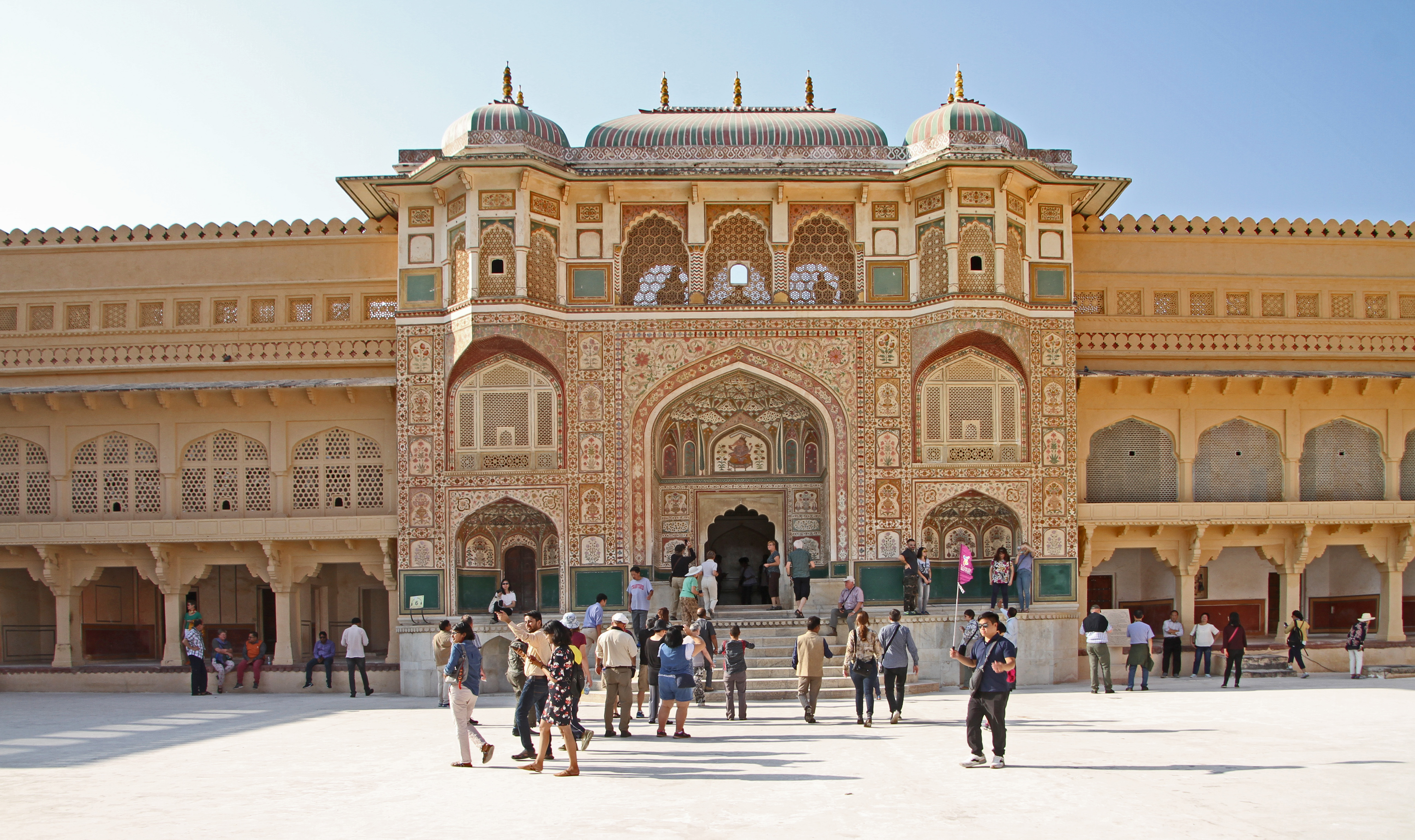
Amber Fort in Jaipur, the residence of Man Singh I.

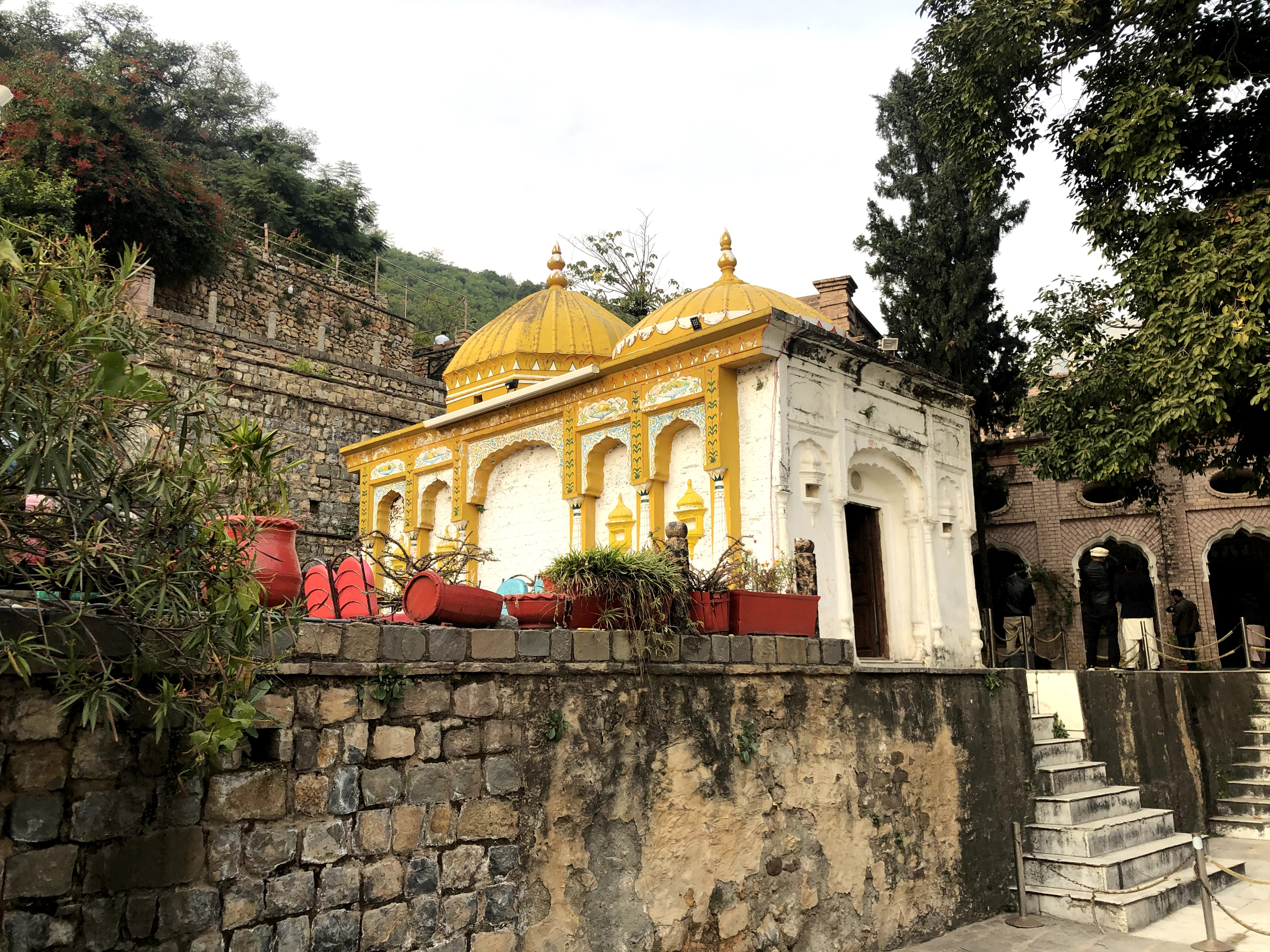
Ram Mandir in Islamabad, Pakistan is built by him.

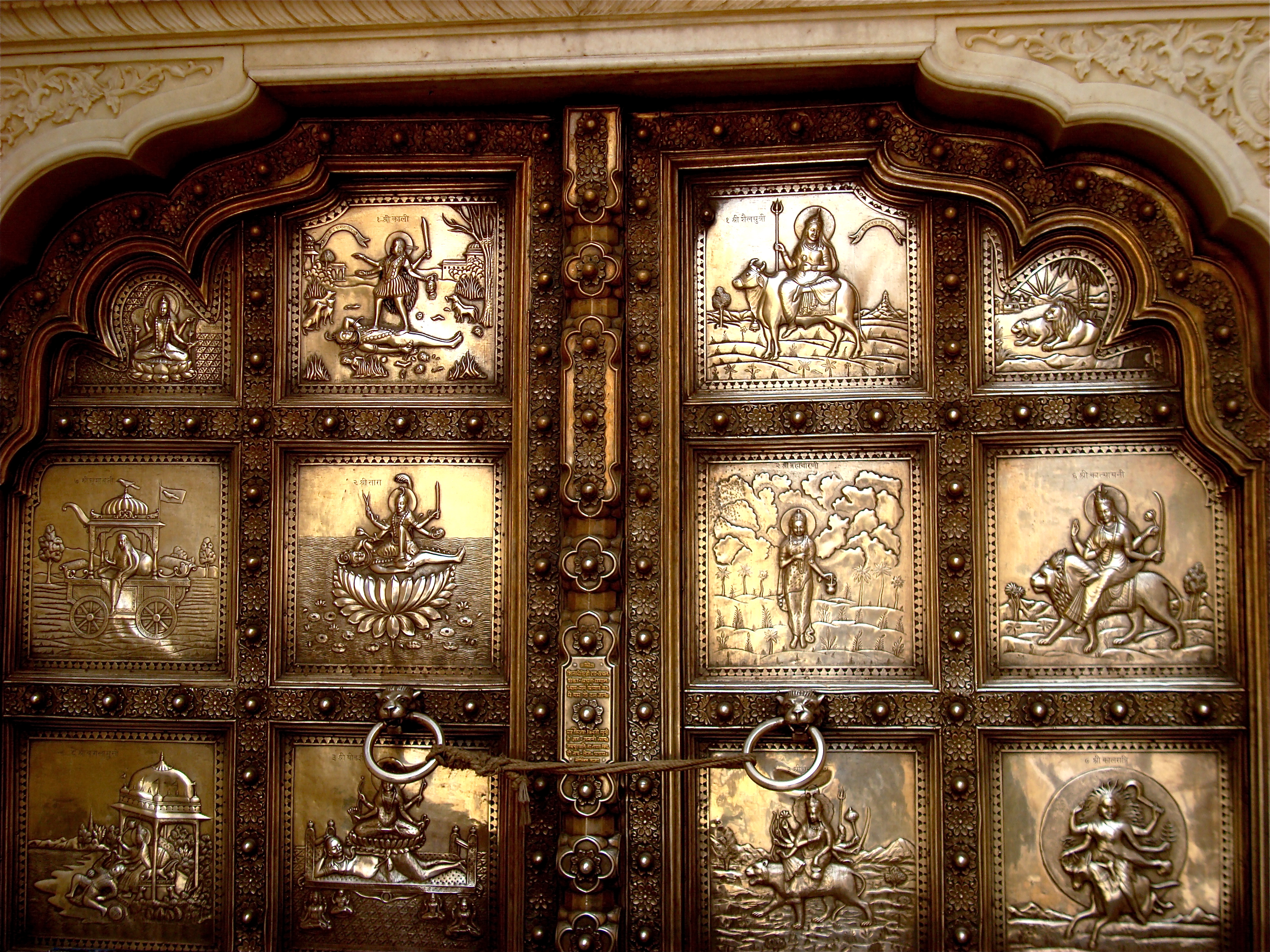
The door of Amber Fort depicting Shila Devi, brought by Man Singh I.

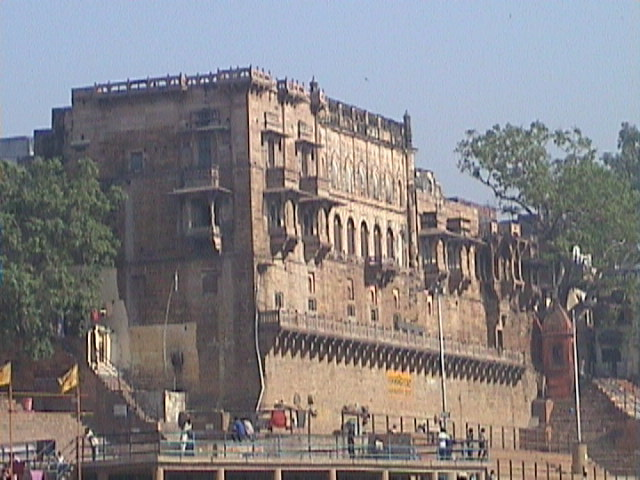
Man Mandir Ghat in Varanasi built by Man Singh I.

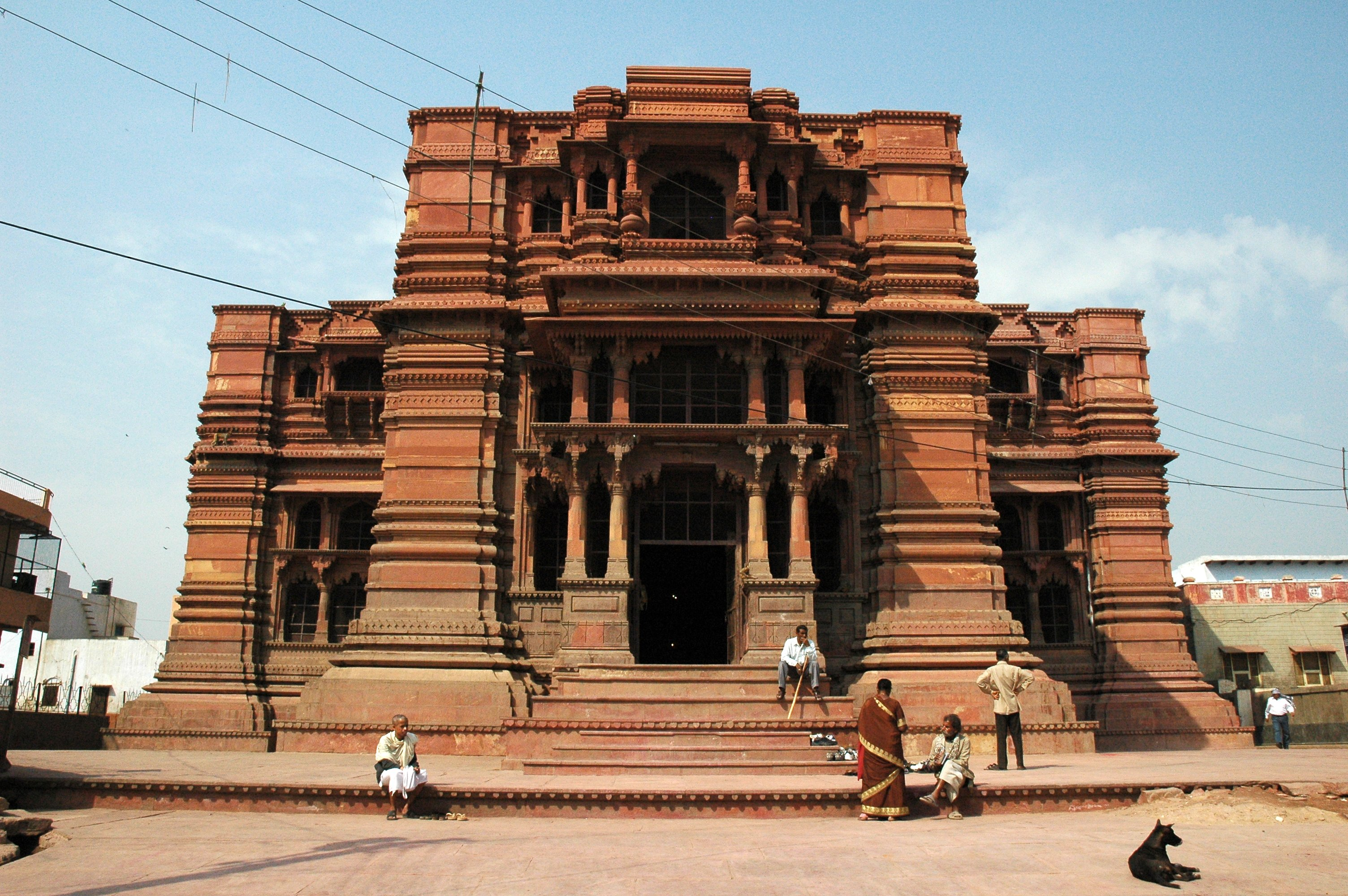
Govind Dev Temple in Vrindavan built by Man Singh I.

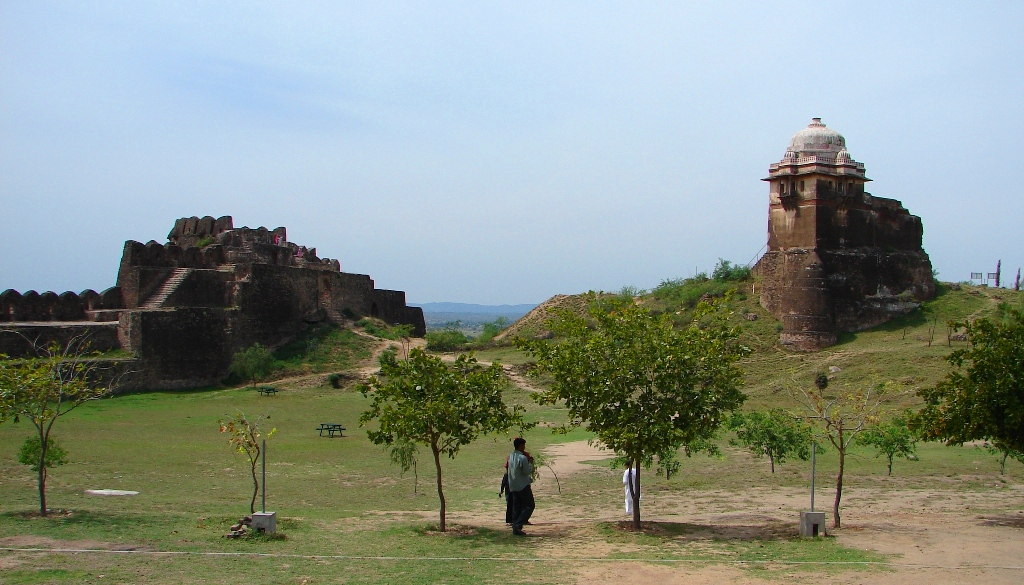
Tomb of Raja Man Singh in Jhelum.

== In popular culture ==
- 2023: Taj: Divided by Blood, broadcast on ZEE5, where he was played by Digambar Prasad.
- 2018–2019: Dastaan-E-Mohabbat Salim Anarkali, broadcast on Colors TV, where he was played by Karan Sharma.
- 2013–2015: Jodha Akbar, broadcast on Zee TV, where he was played by Ankit Raizada.
- 2013–2015: Bharat Ka Veer Putra – Maharana Pratap, broadcast by Sony Entertainment Television (India), where he was portrayed by Praveen Sirohi
- 1988-1989 : Bharat Ek Khoj, broadcast on Doordarshan, where he was played by Surendra Pal.
- 1966 : Malayalam language Anarkali (1966 film) where he was played by Kottarakkara Sreedharan Nair.
- 1960 : Indian epic historical drama film Mughal-e-Azam where he was played by Murad.
- 1958 : Urdu language Anarkali (1958 film) where he was played by G.N. Butt.
- 1955 : Telugu language Anarkali (1955 film) where he was played by V. Nagayya.
- 1953 : Anarkali (1953 film) where he was played by S. L. Puri.

== See also ==
- House of Kachwaha
- List of Rajputs
- Pratap Singh, Maharana of Mewar
- Origin of Rajputs
- Dara Shikoh
