= Bhamashah =

General minister of Maharana Pratap (1547–1600)

Bhamashah Ostwal Kavadia
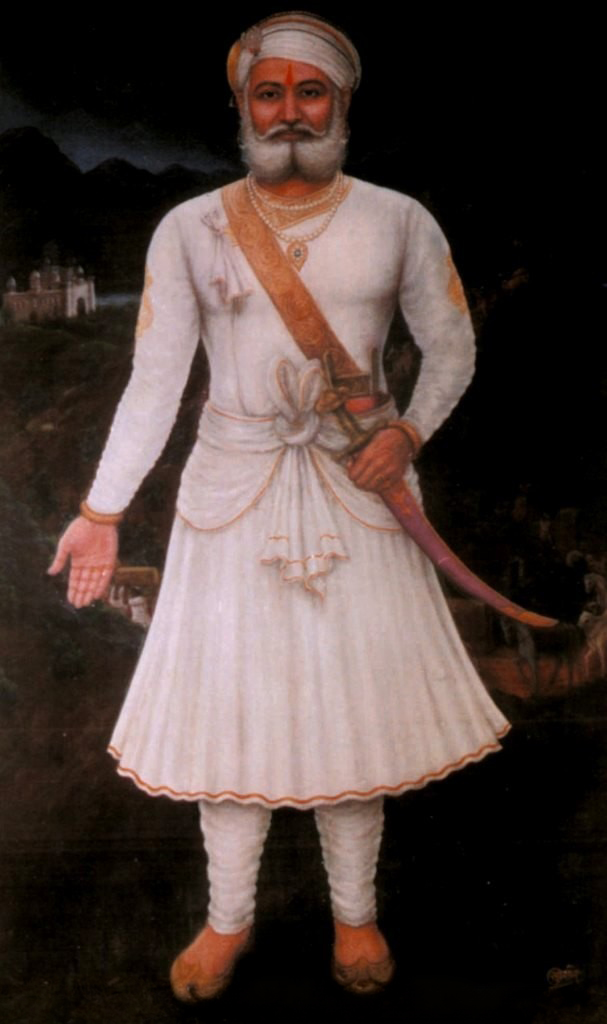
- Successor: Jīvāśāha Kāvaḍiyā (son)
- Born: 28 June 1547; Mewar
- Died: 1600 (aged 52–53); Mewar
- Father: Bhāramala Kāvaḍiyā
- Mother: Karpūradevī Kāvaḍiyā
- Religion: Jainism

Bhāmāśāha Kavadia (28 June 1547 – 1600) was a noted general, minister, and close aide of Maharana Pratap Singh I. The financial support provided by him helped Maharana Pratap to restore his army and reclaim much of his lost territory.

== Biography ==
Bhamashah was born on 28 June 1547 in a Śvetāmbara Murtipujaka Jain Oswal family. His father Bharmal Kavadiya was Gadhpati of Ranthambore Fort appointed by Rana Sangram Singh and was later prime minister under Rana Udai Singh II.

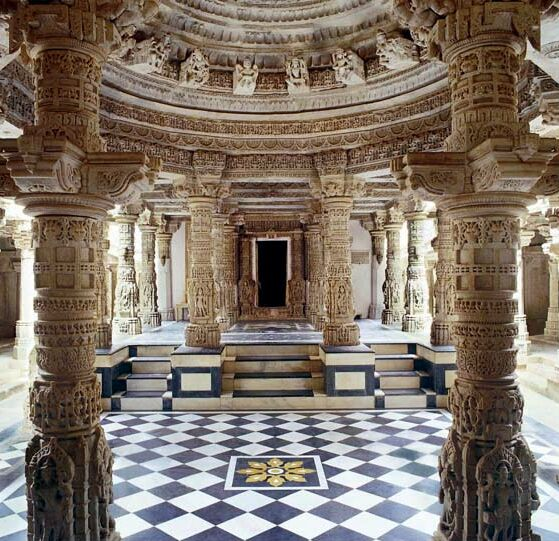

Bhamashah was the Nagar Seth of Chittor. After the costly Battle of Haldighati, Maharana Pratap's financial situation was dire.

Bhamashah and his brother Tarachand gave 2,000,000 gold coins and 25,000,000 silver rupees to Maharana Pratap. They attacked Mughal army camps and partially financed Rana from the gained wealth. Maharana Pratap was able to organize an army and furthered his campaign against the Mughals.

Bhamashah was appointed as the prime minister by Maharana Pratap and Tarachand was appointed as a governor of 'Godwad' region after the Battle of Haldighati.

'Sadri' was founded by Tarachand where he had constructed many buildings. Sadri is considered the gate way to Marwar.

Bhamashah died in 1600. At the time of his death he was Mewar's treasurer under Amar Singh I. Descendants of Bhamashah also served as prime ministers of the Ranas of Udaipur for a few generations. His son Jiwashah was the chief during the rule of Rana Amar Singh, and grandson Akshayraj was the prime minister during the rule of Rana Karan Singh and his descendant Rana Jagat Singh. His descendants still live in Udaipur.

== Legacy ==
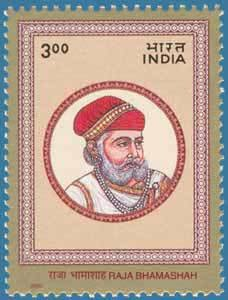
Raja Bhamashah postage stamp, 2000

Bhamashah's birth anniversary or Bhamashah Jayanti is celebrated every year.

There is a memorial in Udaipur to him. The government of India issued a postage stamp in his honor in the year 2000.

The Maharana of Mewar Charitable Foundation has instituted the "Bhama Shah Award" to honour Rajasthani students securing the highest percentage in select departments in the universities of Rajasthan, in recognition of selfless sacrifice, astute financial management, and devotion to duty. The Annual State Award consists of a cash award of ₹2,001 (US$21), a commemorative medal and a Merit certificate.

A Bhamashah Yojana bas been started on his name by government of Rajasthan.

The 1926 silent film Diwan Bhamansha by Mohan Bhavnani was based on Bhamashah's life; Another film about the general, titled Bhamashah, was released in 2017.

A road Bhamashah Marg exists near Kirpal Bagh in North Delhi.
