= Chokha (painter) =

Indian painter

Chokha was an early 19th-century painter of Rajasthan in India. He was the son of Bakta, also a painter, and produced works for both the courts of Mewar and Devgarh.

== Gallery ==
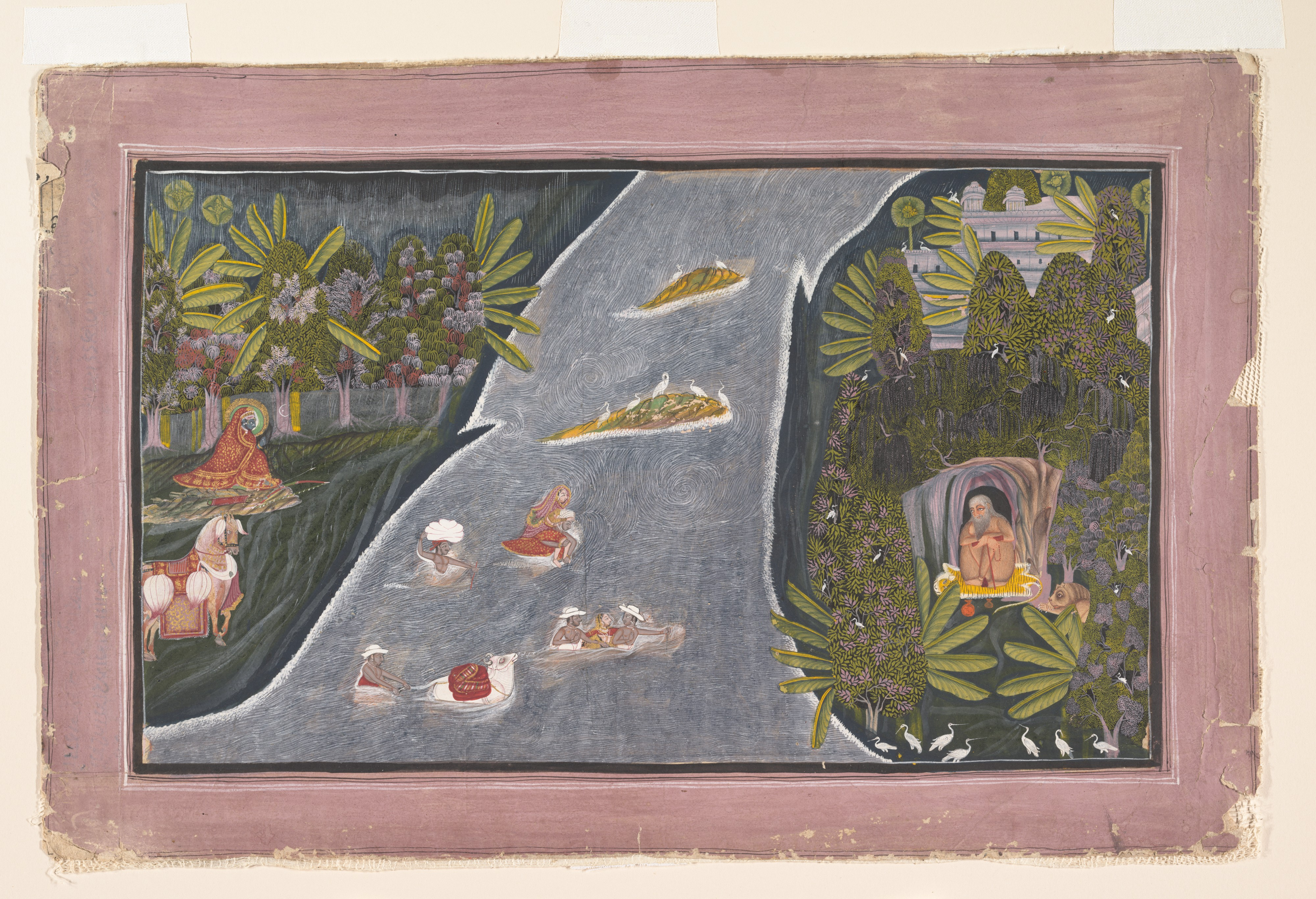
Radha Crosses a River to Interview a Hindu Sage, c. 1820

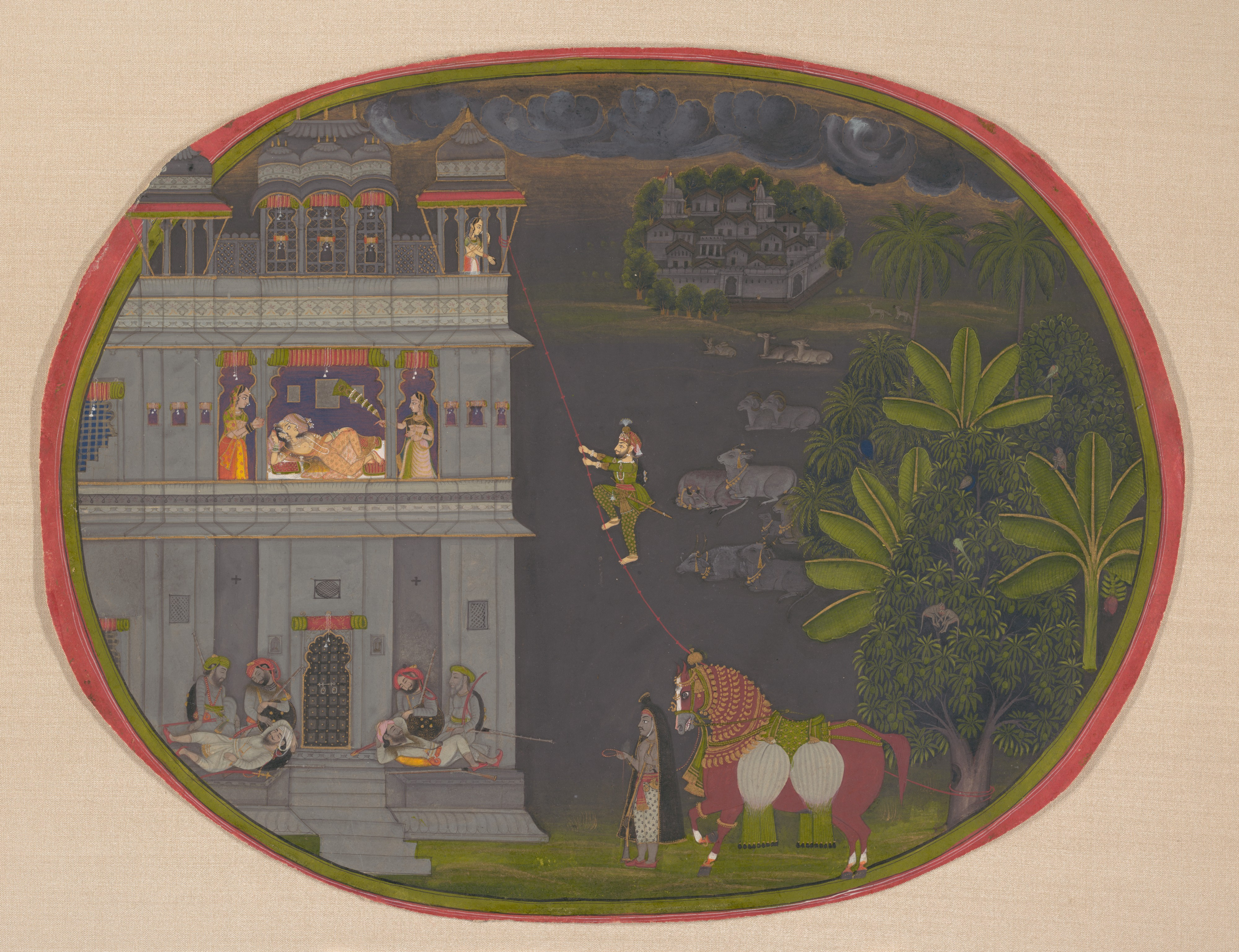
Escapade at night, c. 1800 – c. 1810

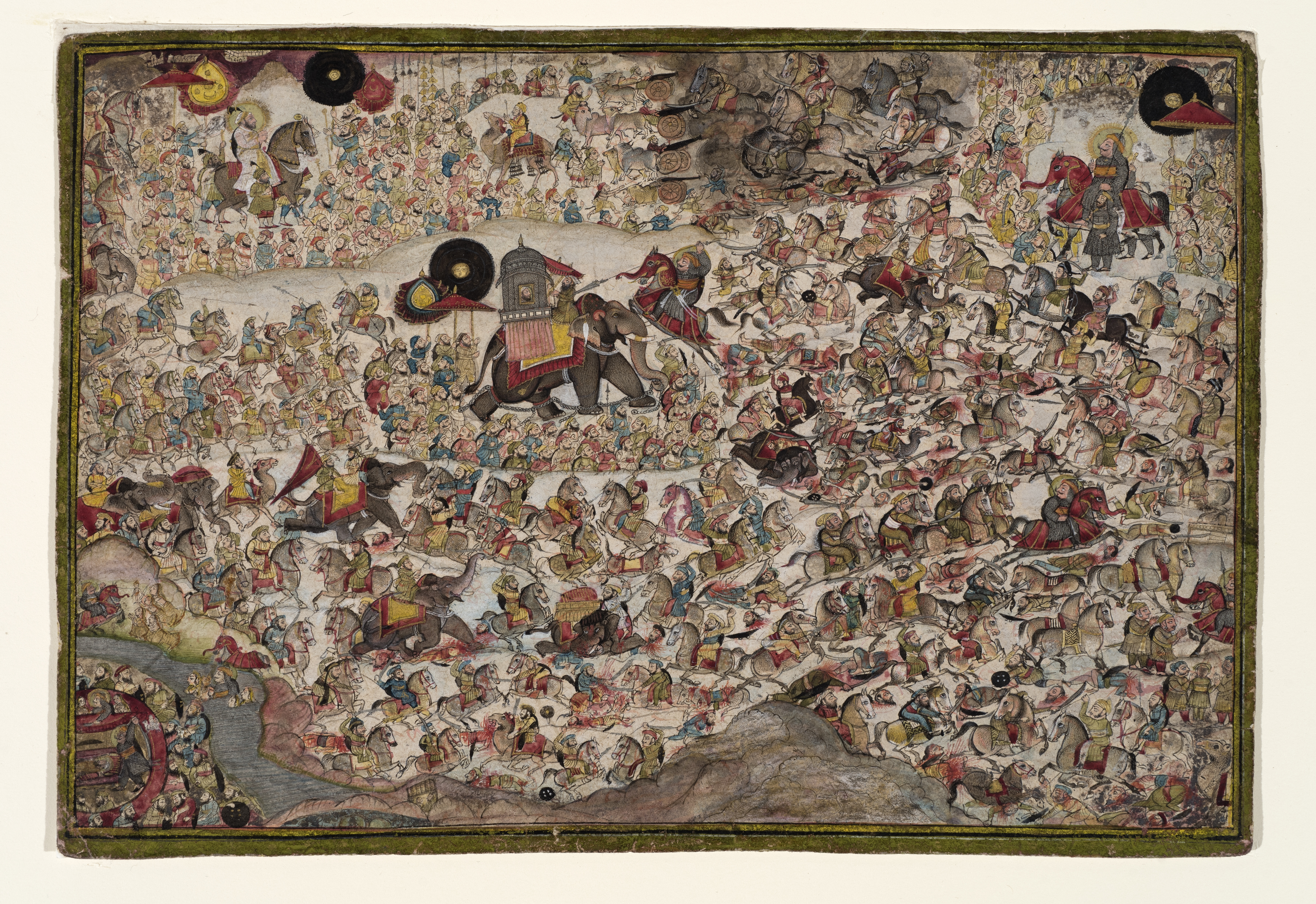
The Battle of Haldighati, c. 1810 – c. 1820
