= Bhati (surname) =

Bhati House of Jaisalmer
- Coat of arms

- Flag of the Kingdom of Jaisalmer
- Country: Kingdom of Jaisalmer
- Founded: 3rd century
- Founder: Rao Bhati
- Current head: Chaitanya Raj Singh
- Final ruler: Maharawal Girdhar Singh
- Titles: Rawal (later Maharawal) of Jaisalmer

The Bhati is a surname as well as the name of a historically prominent Rajput clan of Yaduvanshi (Chandravanshi) lineage, associated with a ruling dynasty centered in Jaisalmer in present-day Rajasthan.

Historical scholarship describes the Bhatis as part of the Yaduvanshi Rajput tradition, tracing descent from the Yadu lineage associated with Krishna and forming one of the notable ruling lineages of the Thar desert region.

Scholarly works on Rajput history group the Bhati clan with other Yaduvanshi Rajput lineages such as the Jadeja and Chudasama clans.

Bhati (also romanised as Bhattī) is a Rajput clan. The Bhati clan historically ruled over several cities in present-day India and Pakistan with their final capital and kingdom being Jaisalmer, India.

== History ==
The Bhatis belongs to the Yadava clan of Rajputs. They reportedly originated in Mathura through a common ancestor named Rao Bhati, who claimed descent from Pradyumna, a Hindu mythological figure. According to the seventeenth-century Nainsi ri Khyat, the Bhatis after losing Mathura moved to Bhatner in Lakhi Jungle, and from there to other locations in western and northwestern India including Punjab. Rao Bhati conquered and annexed territories from 14 princes in Punjab, including the area of modern-day Lahore. He is also credited with establishing the modern town of Bathinda in the Lakhi jungle area in the 3rd century. The Bhatis also claim descent through Rao Bhati from Raja Sálbán, the legendary founder of Sialkot.

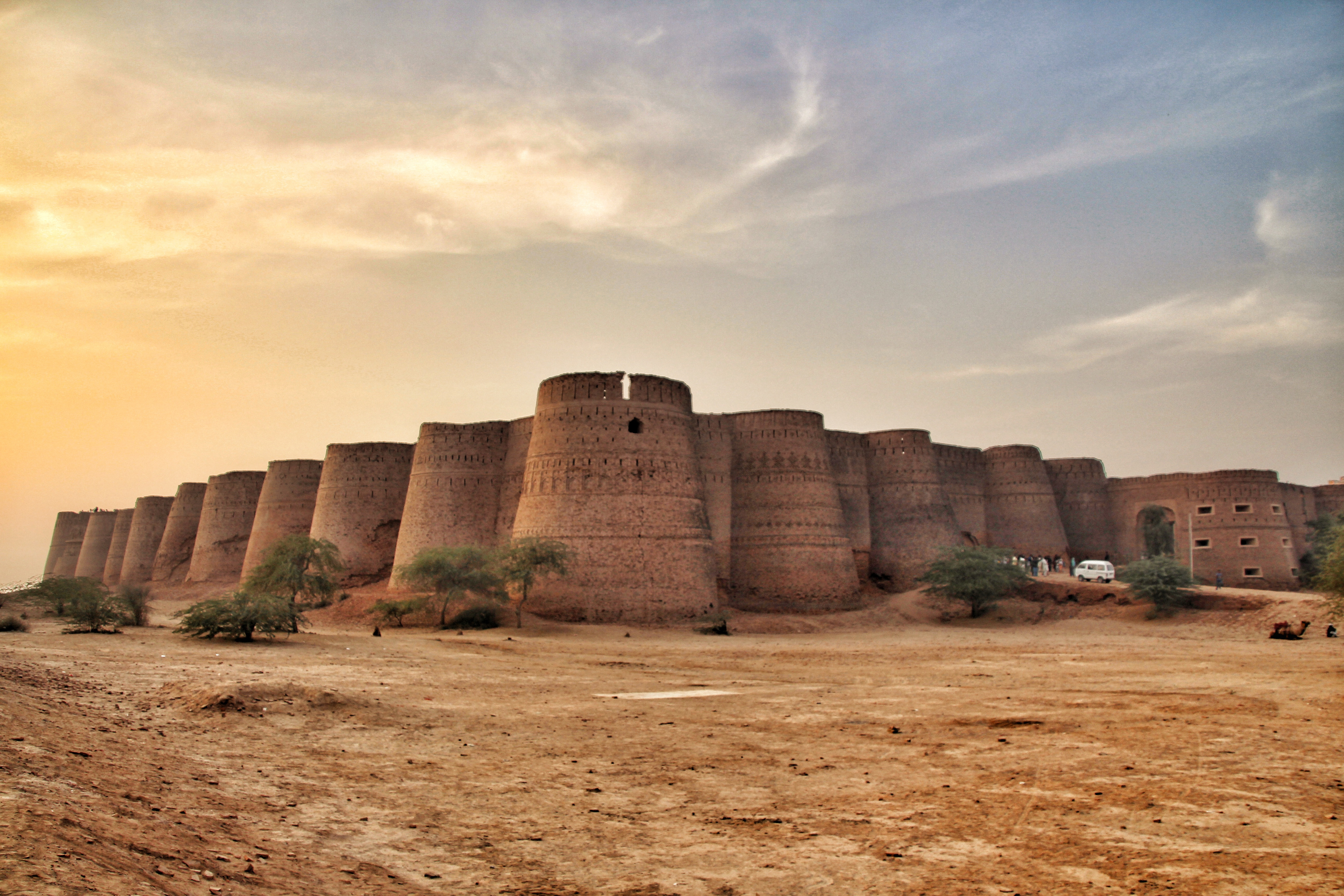
Derawar Fort, is named after Rawal Devraj Bhati, a 9th-century Bhati ruler, who had his capital at Lodhruva.

The Bhati ruler of Tanot, Rao Tannu-ji, utilized his long reign (until 814 AD) to consolidate the Bhatis' expanding strength in western Rajasthan and the eastern Cholistan desert area. He is credited with defeating and destroying the domains of the Varya Rajputs and Langas of Multan. A unified attack against the Tanot Bhatis by the Pathans led by Hussain Shah, together with tribes such as the Langas, Khichis, Khokars (Ghakkars), Johiyas, and others, was successfully driven back under Tannu-ji's leadership. In the 10th century, the Bhati rulers near Multan as well as the Muslim Emir of Multan were eager to assist Jayapala, the Hindu Shahi ruler of Afghanistan, because of the slave incursions into their territories by the rulers of Ghazni. However, Jayapala was unable to conquer Ghazni, and the alliance he had formed quickly fell apart. By the 12th-century, Rohri and Sukkur in the present-day Sindh, Pakistan as well as Pugal and Chohtan in Rajasthan had been incorporated into the dominion of the Bhati Rajputs. The Muslim chiefs of Sindh and Multan, as well as other Rajput clans like Panwar, Solanki, and Sodhas, were all at strife with the Bhati rulers by this time. Jaisalmer had a dynasty with a successful line of rulers and this became their center. Bhatner, Pugal, Bikrampur, Barsalpur, Deravar, Marot, Kehror, Aasnikot, Tanot, Lodhruva and Mamanvahan were some of the fortified settlements that were historically ruled by the Bhati clan or subclans. The Bhati ruler Vijayrao Lanjo ruled a vast empire, He was known as the 'uttara disi bhad kivaad' (the sentinel of the north direction), due to his control over forts and settlements that extended from Ghazni to Gujarat, leading to several conflicts with the invading Muslim tribes. According to epigraphic evidence, Vijayarao Lanjo took the large title of Parambhattaraka Maharajadhiraja Parameshwara (the paramount sovereign, great king of kings, the supreme reality). He was succeeded by his son, Bhojde in 1143. However, Bhojde's uncle Rawal Jaisal Singh colluded with the Ghaznavid chiefs, and Bhojde was killed in the resulting combat. Following Bhojde's death, Jaisal Singh became the head of Bhatis. In general, the Bhatis' interactions with Islamic powers were not entirely harmonious. They had defeated multiple Islamic attacks by the Qaramithas, Ghaznavids, and Ghurids before the end of the 12th century.

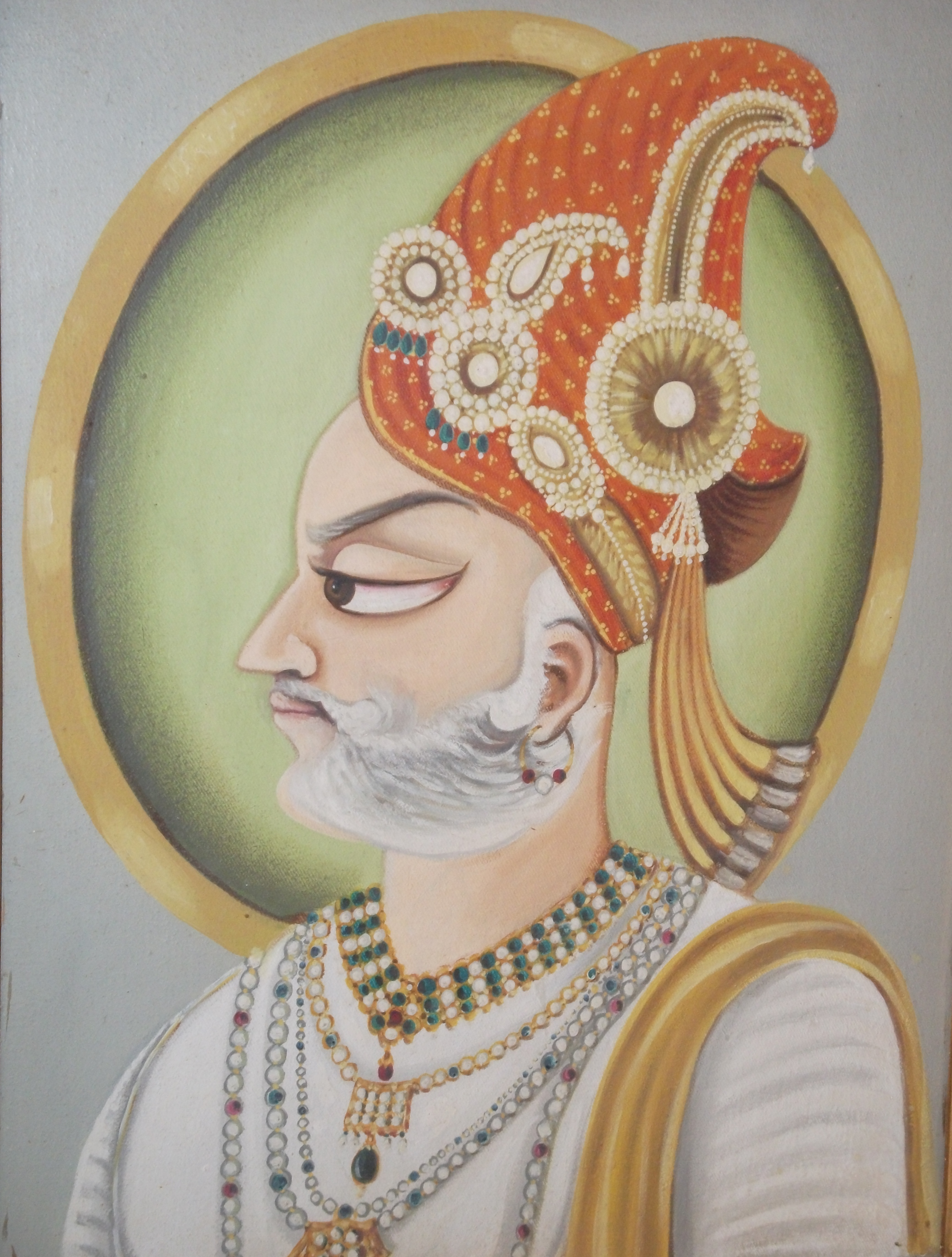
Maharawal Jaisal Singh, a notable Bhati Rajput Ruler

Timur invaded India in 1398, when he held a vast empire in the Middle East and Central Asia. He suffered tough resistance in India only from the Bhati ruler, Rai Dul Chand of Bhatner. Rajputs and Muslims fought together against Timur under him but the Bhatner fort was ultimately sacked with the city burnt and laid waste. The Rathores, the Balochs, the Dehli Sultans, and eventually the Mughals had all clashed with the Bhati kings. The cities of Kapurthala, Ambala and Batala in Punjab are said to be founded by the Bhati Rajputs. Rana Kapur, an immigrant from Jaisalmer founded Kapurthala in the early 11th-century, Raja Amba of Taoni subclan founded Ambala in the 14th century, whereas Rai Ram Deo founded Batala in 1465. By the same 15th-century, Rao Kelana, a powerful Bhati Rajput ruler of Pugal had expanded his territories up to Bhatinda and Abohar, and was responsible for the death of Rathore ruler Chunda of Marwar. Rao Kelana invaded Dera Ghazi Khan and defeated the Balochs. As part of the peace settlement that followed, Zubeida, the daughter of the Baloch chief Jam Ismail Khan (founder of Dera Ismail Khan), was married to the Bhati ruler. In 1613, Raja Kishan Singh, a Rathore ruler and the founder of Kishangarh State complained his brother-in-law Jahangir, the Mughal emperor, about a Bhati sardar, Govind Das Bhati, for killing his brother, and thereafter, the Raja, along with his followers, executed the Bhati sardar as per the direction of Jahangir. As Govind Das Bhati was a noble affiliated with the Rathore ruler Sur Singh, as a consequence his son, Gaj Singh of Marwar, killed Raja Kishan Singh.

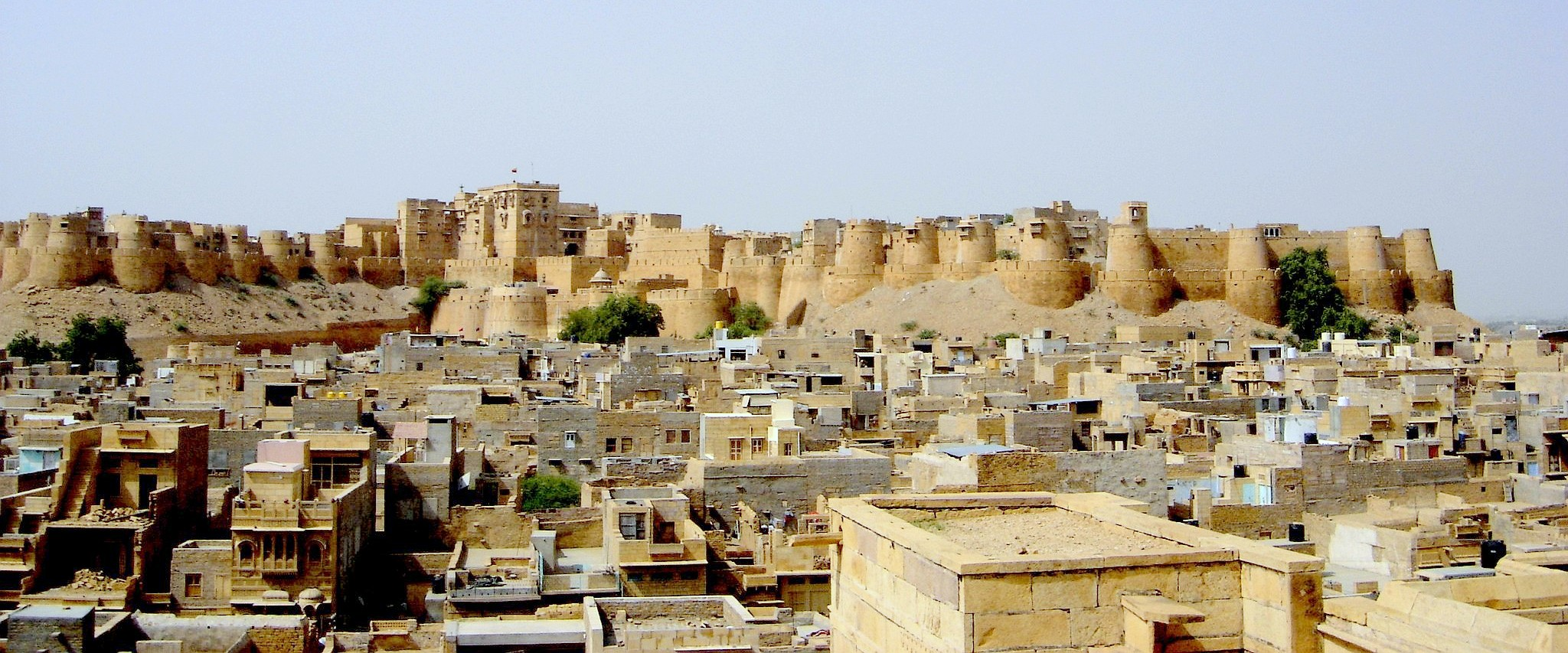
Jaisalmer Fort of the Bhati Rajputs

The historian André Wink states that prior to the Bhatis' expulsion from the country of Zabulistan, they reportedly inhabited as far as Samarkand in Uzbekistan. The Bhatis claim to be the ancestors of the Chughtai Mughals. The historian Tanuja Kothiyal notes that a part of such claims may well be justified. The Phulkian dynasty claimed direct descent from Rawal Jaisal Singh, the Bhati Rajput founder of the Kingdom of Jaisalmer.

== Culture and ethos ==
The greeting used by Bhati Rajputs is Jai Shri Kishan ("victory to Lord Krishna") as opposed to the general Rajput greeting Jai Mata Jiri ("victory of the Mother Goddess").

Dulla Bhatti was a Punjabi landlord who led a revolt against Akbar, the Mughal emperor. He remains Punjab's folk hero and is made the centrepiece of all Lohri songs.

Mehta Kalu, the father of Guru Nanak, was an employee of Rai Bular Bhatti. Bhatti was among the first few people who viewed Nanak as someone who was specially gifted by God. The 757 murabas (approx. 18,750 acres) of land he donated to Guru Nanak is now under the control of Evacuee Trust Property Board of Pakistan.

While the Kingdom of Mewar came to symbolize Rajput resistance in the nineteenth century—primarily due to its steadfast opposition to Mughal expansion and its inward-looking emphasis on clan orthodoxy—contemporary chroniclers such as Muhnot Nainsi identified Jaisalmer as the true heart of the Rajput world. Unlike Mewar, which defined Rajput identity through rigid genealogical purity and martial defiance, Jaisalmer embodied a more expansive and networked conception of Rajputness. Through its extensive web of alliances with various clans across regions, Jaisalmer played a central role in articulating a broader Rajput political and cultural sphere, where opposition to the Mughals or Turks was just one among many expressions of Rajput identity.

== Notable people ==
- Bhati or Bhattiya, the father of Bimbisara (558–491 BC) the ancient Indian king of Magadha
- Ajaib Singh Bhatti (born 1951), Indian politician of Punjab
- Dhirendra Singh Bhati (born 1966), Indian politician of Uttar Pradesh
- Chiman Singh Bhati (died 1975), Indian politician of Rajasthan
- Ravindra Singh Bhati (born 1997), Indian politician of Rajasthan
- Devi Singh Bhati (born 1946), Indian politician of Rajasthan
- Hridayeshwar Singh Bhati (born 2002), Indian chess innovator
- Narayan Singh Bhati (1930–2004), Indian writer
- Bhanwar Singh Bhati (born 1974), Indian politician of Rajasthan
- Bheem Raj Singh Bhati (born 1947), Indian politician of Rajasthan

== See also ==
- Bhati Dynasty
- Jaisalmer
