= Bairi Sal (ruler) =

Maharawal of Jaisalmer (1864–1891)

- Chhatrala Yadupati; Rukn-ud-Daula; Maharajadhiraja Raj-Rajeshwar; Parama Bhattarak; Muzaffar Jang Bijaimand

Maharawal of Jaisalmer
- Reign: c. 1864– 10 March 1891
- Predecessor: Ranjit Singh
- Successor: Shalivahan Singh
- Born: c. 1848
- Died: 10 March 1891
- House: Jaisalmer
- Dynasty: Bhati
- Father: Kesari Singh

Bairi Sal was the Maharawal of Jaisalmer from 1864 until his death in 1891.

== Early life and family ==
He was born in 1848 to Kesari Singh. His father was the Thakur of Nachna and a Rajvi of Jaisalmer. He married, amongst others, in 1857, a daughter of Amar Singh, Thakur of Mahajan; a daughter of Shivdan Singh, Thakur of Daspan; and, in 1873, a daughter of Udai Singh II, Maharawal of Dungarpur.

== Reign ==
On the death of his elder brother, Ranjit Singh, in 1864, he succeeded him as the Maharawal of Jaisalmer. He was adopted by the widows of his deceased brother. But he refused to sit on the throne of Jaisalmer and requested that someone else be selected, as he felt he would never be happy as the ruler of Jaisalmer. In view of this, and owing to his minority, the Government of India permitted the question of installation to remain in abeyance. Sixteen months later, he had overcome his diffidence and was formally installed as Maharawal on 19 October 1865.

During his minority, his father, Kesari Singh, managed the affairs of state. Upon the death of Kesari Singh, Chattar Singh continued administering the affairs of state. He was granted an imperial flag in honour of Queen Victoria being proclaimed Empress of India at the Delhi Durbar on 1 January 1877.

== Death ==
He died on 10 March 1891. His widows, with the consent of the Government of India, adopted Sham Singh, who succeeded him as the Maharawal of Jaisalmer under the regnal name Shalivahan Singh.
