= Shalivahan Singh =

Maharawal of Jaisalmer (1891–1914)

- Chhatrala Yadupati; Rukn-ud-Daula; Maharajadhiraja Raj-Rajeshwar; Parama Bhattarak; Muzaffar Jang Bijaimand

Maharawal of Jaisalmer
- Reign: 10 March 1891 – 14 April 1914
- Predecessor: Bairi Sal
- Successor: Jawahir Singh
- Born: Shyam Singh; 12 June 1887
- Died: 14 April 1914 (aged 26)
- Wives: Het Kanwar (m. 1907); Gulab Kanwar (m. 1913)
- House: Jaisalmer
- Dynasty: Bhati
- Father: Khushal Singh
- Education: Mayo College

Shalivahan Singh (12 June 1887 – 14 April 1914) was Maharawal of Jaisalmer from 10 March 1891 until his death in 1914.

== Early life, family, and education ==
He was born as Shyam Singh on 12 June 1887 to Khushal Singh, the Thakur of Lathi. He was educated at Mayo College, Ajmer, which he left in 1906 after passing the diploma exam. He married, firstly, Het Kanwar, a daughter of Kesari Singh, the Maharao of Sirohi, on 16 February 1907; and secondly, Gulab Kanwar, a daughter of Mansinhji II, the Maharana of Dhrangadhra, on 25 November 1913.

== Reign ==
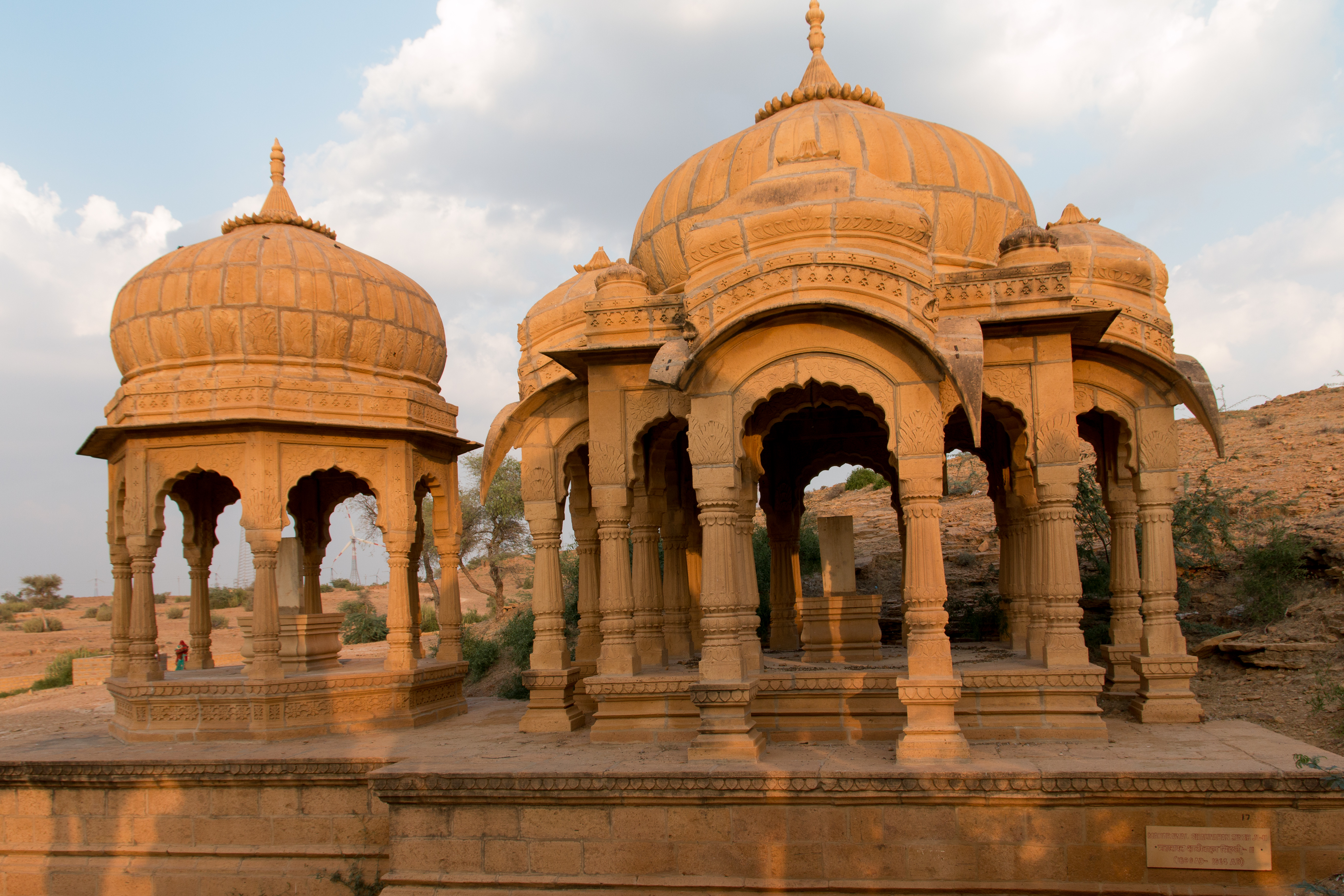
Chhatri of Shalivahan Singh

When Bairi Sal died on 10 March 1891, his widows, with the consent of the Government of India, adopted him as the successor of the deceased. At the time of his ascension to the throne of Jaisalmer, he assumed the name Shalivahan. On account of his minority, a council of regency was established under the supervision of the Resident at Jodhpur. This council, along with the Diwan, administered the affairs of the state until he came of age. He was invested with full administrative powers on 14 December 1908. He subsequently personally supervised the administration of the state and introduced a series of fiscal reforms.

== Death ==
He died on 14 April 1914 and was succeeded by Jawahir Singh.
