= Jawahir Singh =

Maharawal of Jaisalmer (1914 - 1949)

- Chhatrala Yadupati; Rukn-ud-Daula; Maharajadhiraja Raj-Rajeshwar; Parama Bhattarak; Muzaffar Jang Bijaimand
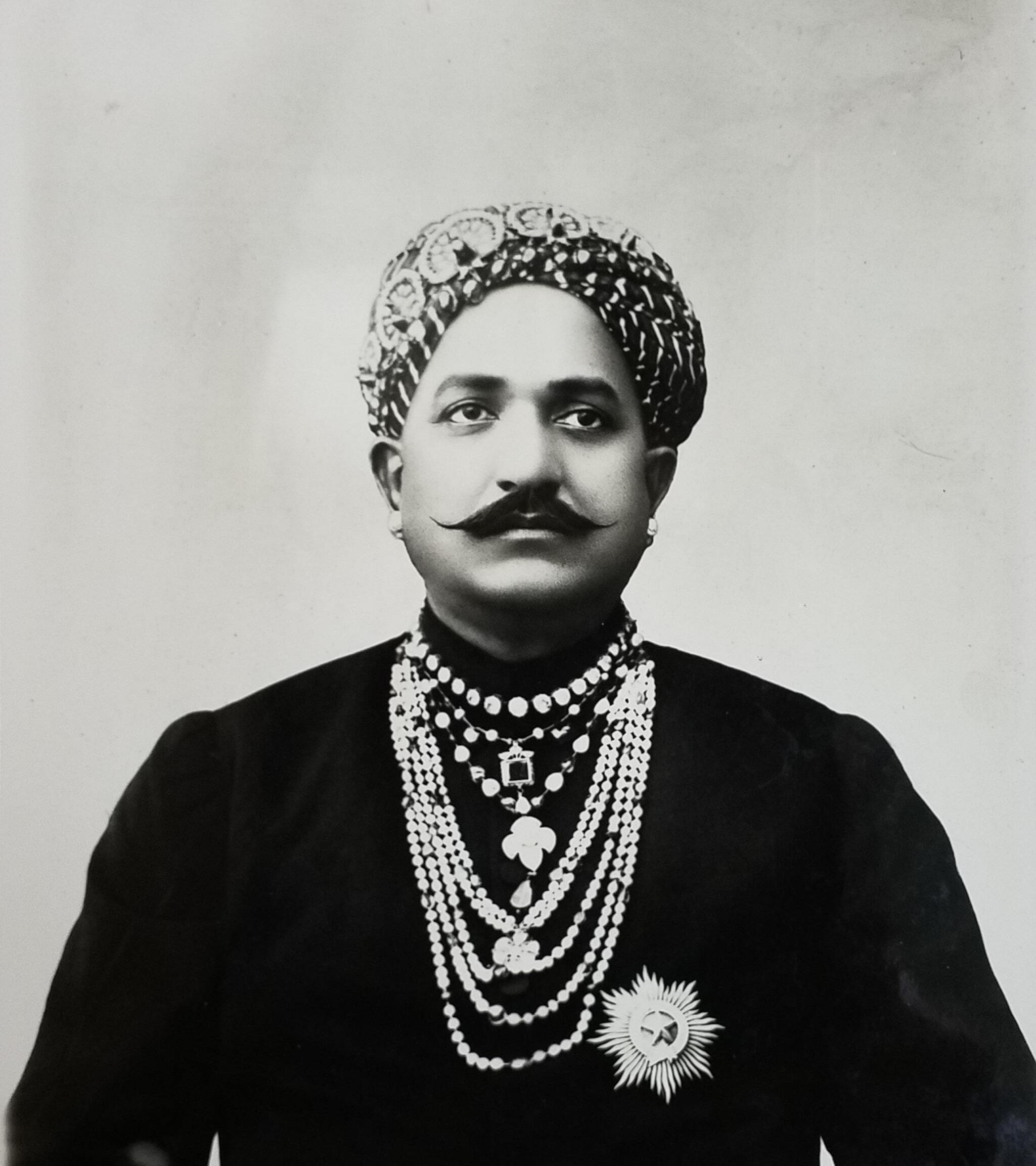
- Singh in 1936

Maharawal of Jaisalmer
- Reign: 26 June 1914 – 17 February 1949
- Predecessor: Shalivahan Singh
- Successor: Girdhar Singh
- Born: 18 November 1882
- Died: 17 February 1949 (aged 66)
- Wives: Lakshmi Kanwar; Yadu Kanwar; Kalyan Kanwar
- Issue: Girdhar Singh; Hukum Singh
- House: Jaisalmer
- Dynasty: Bhati
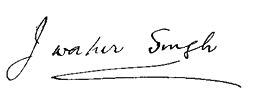
- Signature
- Education: Mayo College; Imperial Cadet Corps

Sir Jawahir Singh KCSI (18 November 1882 – 17 February 1949) was Maharawal of Jaisalmer State from 26 June 1914 until his death in 1949.

== Early life, family, and education ==
He was born on 18 November 1882 to Sardar Singh. He was adopted by Man Singh, the Thakur of Eta, in 1889. He was educated at Mayo College, Ajmer. He left the school after he was selected to join the Imperial Cadet Corps on 2 January 1902. He married thrice: firstly to Lakshmi Kanwar, secondly to Yadu Kanwar, from Amarkot; and thirdly to Kalyan Kanwar, a granddaughter of HH Maharao Ram Singh of Bundi, in November 1919. By his wives, he had two sons: Girdhar Singh and Hukum Singh.

== Reign ==
When Shalivahan Singh died, the throne of Jaisalmer State became vacant, as he left behind neither an heir by blood nor by adoption to succeed him. The Government of India, after consulting the nobles of the Jaisalmer State, selected him as the successor to the throne. Accordingly, his succession as the Maharawal of Jaisalmer State was announced on 26 June 1914, and he was formally installed by the Agent to the Governor-General of India on 9 July 1914.

== Death ==
He died on 17 February 1949, and was succeeded by his son Girdhar Singh.

== Honours ==
He was made a Knight Commander of the Order of the Star of India on 1 January 1918 (1918 New Year Honours).
