= Hukam Singh (Rajasthan politician) =

Indian politician

- Born: 14 February 1927
- Died: 17 March 2024 (aged 97)
- Issue: Jitendra Singh; Divya Kumari
- House: Jaisalmer
- Dynasty: Bhati
- Father: Jawahir Singh
- Mother: Kalyan Kanwar
- Religion: Hinduism
- Education: Mayo College
- Alma mater: Agra University

Member of the Rajasthan Legislative Assembly
- In office 1957–1967
- Preceded by: Hadvant Singh
- Succeeded by: B. Singh
- Constituency: Jaisalmer

District Chief of Jaisalmer
- In office 1959–1969

Hukam Singh (14 February 1927 – 17 March 2024) was an Indian politician who served as MLA from Jaisalmer from 1957 to 1967.

== Early life, family, and education ==
He was born on 14 February 1927 to Jawahir Singh, the Maharawal of Jaisalmer, and his wife, Kalyan Kanwar. His mother was the granddaughter of Ram Singh, the Maharao Raja of Bundi. Like his father and brother, Singh was educated at Ajmer’s Mayo College. He subsequently attended Agra University, from which he graduated with a Bachelor's degree in Sanskrit.

He married, in 1948, Girdhar Kumari, a daughter of Virbhadra Singh of Dungarpur. By her, he had a son, Jitendra Singh, and a daughter, Divya Kumari. He played an important role in the merger of Jaisalmer with the Rajasthan Union to form Greater Rajasthan.

== Political career ==
He served as the Member of the Legislative Assembly for Jaisalmer for two consecutive terms from 1957 to 1967. He wielded considerable influence over the people of Jaisalmer—so much so that even Congress leaders were unable to oppose him effectively. Recognising his influence, Congress leaders approached Singh and invited him to join the party, which he did during the 1962 Indian general election. From 1959 to 1969, he served as District Chief of Jaisalmer, during which time he laid the foundation for the prompt resolution of local issues and the development of the region. He also donated his honorarium to establish a collection of rare and unique books in the District Council Library.

== Death ==
He died at his residence, Mandir Palace, on 17 March 2024.
