= Girdhar Singh =

Maharawal of Jaisalmer (1949–1950)

- Chhatrala Yadupati; Rukn-ud-Daula; Maharajadhiraja Raj-Rajeshwar; Parama Bhattarak; Muzaffar Jang Bijaimand

Maharawal of Jaisalmer
- Reign: 17 February 1949 – 27 August 1950
- Predecessor: Jawahir Singh
- Successor: Raghunath Singh
- Born: 13 November 1907
- Died: 27 August 1950 (aged 42)
- Spouse: Damayanti Devi; Hawa Kanwar
- Issue: Raghunath Singh; Chandra Vir Singh; Rukmani Devi; Hemant Devi
- House: Jaisalmer
- Dynasty: Bhati
- Education: Mayo College

Lt. Col. Girdhar Singh was the Maharawal of Jaisalmer from 1949 until his death in 1950.

== Early life, family, and education ==
He was born on 13 November 1907 to Jawahir Singh and his wife Sodhiji. He was educated at Mayo College, Ajmer. He married twice: firstly, in 1926, to Damayanti Devi, daughter of Arjun Singh, Raja of Narsinghgarh; and secondly, in 1927, to Hawa Kanwar, daughter of Bher Singh, Thakur of Amarkot. He had two sons, Raghunath Singh and Chandra Vir Singh, and two daughters, Rukmani Devi and Hemant Devi.

He raised an irregular camel unit, called the Jaisalmer Risala, in 1948. This unit was later amalgamated with Ganga Risala to form the Ganga Jaisalmer Risala in 1951.

== Reign ==
Upon the death of his father, he succeeded him as the Maharawal of Jaisalmer on 17 February 1949.

== Death ==
He died on 27 August 1950 and was succeeded by his son Raghunath Singh.
