= Raghunath Singh Bahadur =

Maharawal of Jaisalmer and Indian politician

Raghunath Singh
- Chhatrala Yadupati; Rukn-ud-Daula; Maharajadhiraja Raj-Rajeshwar; Parama Bhattarak; Muzaffar Jang Bijaimand
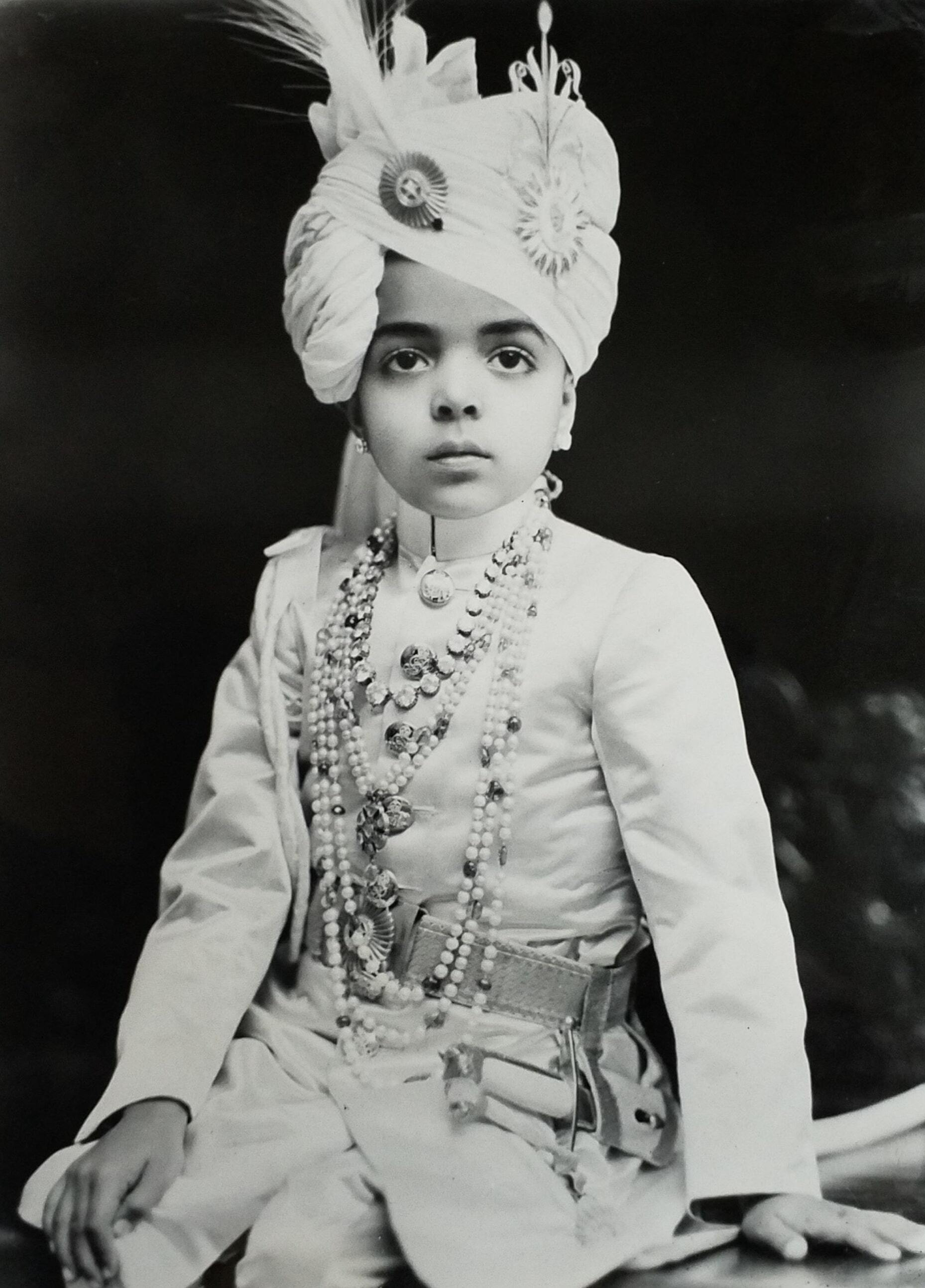

Maharawal of Jaisalmer
- Reign: 27 August 1950 – 28 February 1982
- Predecessor: Girdhar Singh
- Successor: Brijraj Singh
- Born: 28 November 1929; Jaisalmer State, Rajputana, British India
- Died: 28 February 1982 (aged 52)
- Spouse: Mukut Rajya Lakshmi Devi (m. 1950)
- Issue Detail: Brijraj Singh; Prithviraj Singh; Chandra Kumari; Yadunandini Kumari; Sushma Kumari; Rashmi Kumari
- House: Jaisalmer
- Dynasty: Bhati
- Father: Girdhar Singh
- Mother: Damayanti Devi
- Religion: Hinduism
- Education: Mayo College

Member of Parliament, Lok Sabha
- In office 1957–1962
- Preceded by: Bhawani Singh
- Succeeded by: Tan Singh
- Constituency: Barmer

Capt. Raghunath Singh (28 November 1929 – 13 March 1982) was the last Maharawal of Jaisalmer from 1950 until his death in 1982, and a member of the Lok Sabha from 1957 to 1962.

== Early life, education and family ==
He was born on 28 November 1929 to Girdhar Singh. His mother was Damayanti Devi, daughter of Arjun Singh, Raja of Narsinghgarh. He was educated at Mayo College, Ajmer. He married Mukut Rajya Lakshmi Devi on 27 April 1950: she was the daughter of Sharda Shumsher Jang Bahadur Rana. They had two sons—Brijraj Singh and Prithviraj Singh—and four daughters: Chandra Kumari, Yadunandini Kumari, Sushma Kumari, and Rashmi Kumari.

== Reign ==
Upon the death of his father on 27 August 1950, he succeeded him as the Maharawal of Jaisalmer. By the twenty-sixth amendment to the Constitution of India, dated 28 December 1971, he ceased to be recognised as the Maharawal of Jaisalmer. His privy purse was abolished, and his personal privileges were discontinued.

== Political career ==
He contested the 1957 Indian general election to the Lok Sabha as an independent candidate from Barmer. He won the seat by securing 79,317 votes.

== Charity work ==
Raghunath had supported poor cultivators by providing fodder, seed, and easy credit, and assisted orphaned students with food, clothing, and books.

== Personal interests ==
Raghunath was fond of riding, swimming, badminton, tennis, hiking, shooting, and dairy farming. He actively promoted Hindu–Muslim amity.

== Death ==
He died on 28 February 1982.
