= Aujla Banwali =

- Village
- Location in Punjab, India Aujla Banwali (India)
- Coordinates: 31°20′28″N 75°24′50″E
- Country: India
- State: Punjab
- District: Kapurthala

Government
  - Type: Panchayati raj (India)
  - Body: Gram panchayat

Population (2011)
  - Total: 510
- Sex ratio 246 /264♂/♀

Languages
  - Official: Punjabi
  - Other spoken: Hindi
- Time zone: UTC+5:30 (IST)
- PIN: 144601
- Telephone code: 01822
- ISO 3166 code: IN-PB
- Vehicle registration: PB-09
- Website: kapurthala.gov.in

Aujla Banwali is a village in Kapurthala district of Punjab State, India. It is located 5 km away from Kapurthala, which is both district and sub-district headquarters of Aujla Banwali village. The village is administered by sarpanch, an elected representative of the village.

== Etymology and Origin ==
=== Earliest account of Aujla caste ===
Aujla is an hereditary sub-lineage primarily divided into two grand branches of Sardar Joga and Banwal Singh, direct descendant from (Forefather of Ahluwalia Misldar) Sadhu Singh Aujla Jat Chiefs, In the ancestry of Hajual Bhati migrated from the Present Day Jaisalmer Durg.

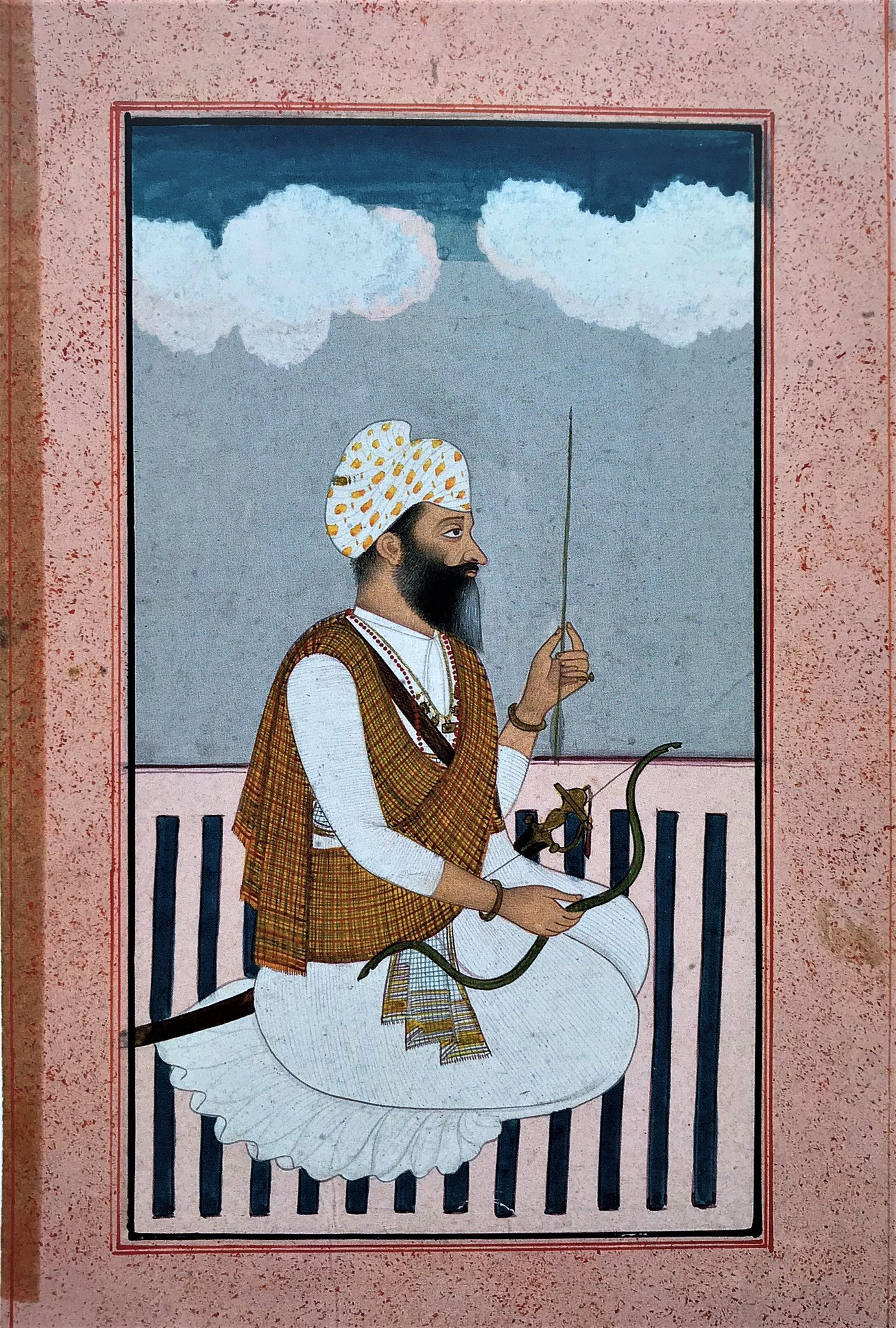
Sardar Bagh Singh Co-founder of Ahluwalia Misal is the supervision of “Sadho” or Sadho Singh

However Jogi Aujla, Kapurthala is over 200 years old and was founded by two brothers of the Aujla clan. These brothers were Sardar Joga Singh Aujla and Sardar Banwal Singh Aujla. They were the grandsons of "Sardar Jassa Singh Ahluwalia" who had conquered Kapurthala decades before their birth. Sardar Joga Singh Aujla had twelve sons and Sardar Banwal Singh Aujla had 10 sons. Later, some of these clan members lost their status and gradually become Ahluwalia Kalal.
