= Lakhlan =

Lakhlan (name originated from Lakhi Jungle) is a community of eight villages (later seven as no family of this clan remains in Sudhiwas) in Behal tehsil, Bhiwani district, in the Indian state of Haryana. Behal is a nearby market. Lakhlan are Jat. The main occupation is agriculture. This community sends many of its youth to join the defence forces and contribute towards national security. Dada Bhomiya is the totem of this clan. A temple is in Patwan. The clan is from Lakhi Jungle. It moved to Patwan around 1200 CE. The eight villages are:

- Patwan
- Garwa
- Mithi
- Morka
- Sudhiwas (No family of this clan is living now in this village)
- Surpura Khurd
- Surpura Kalan
- Behal ki Dhaani
- Mandholi khurd

A branch of this clan can be found in Kanwar Pura Village, Sirsa District, Haryana.
