= Rawal Jaisal =

Rawal of Jaisalmer from 1156 to 1168

- Rawal of Jaisalmer
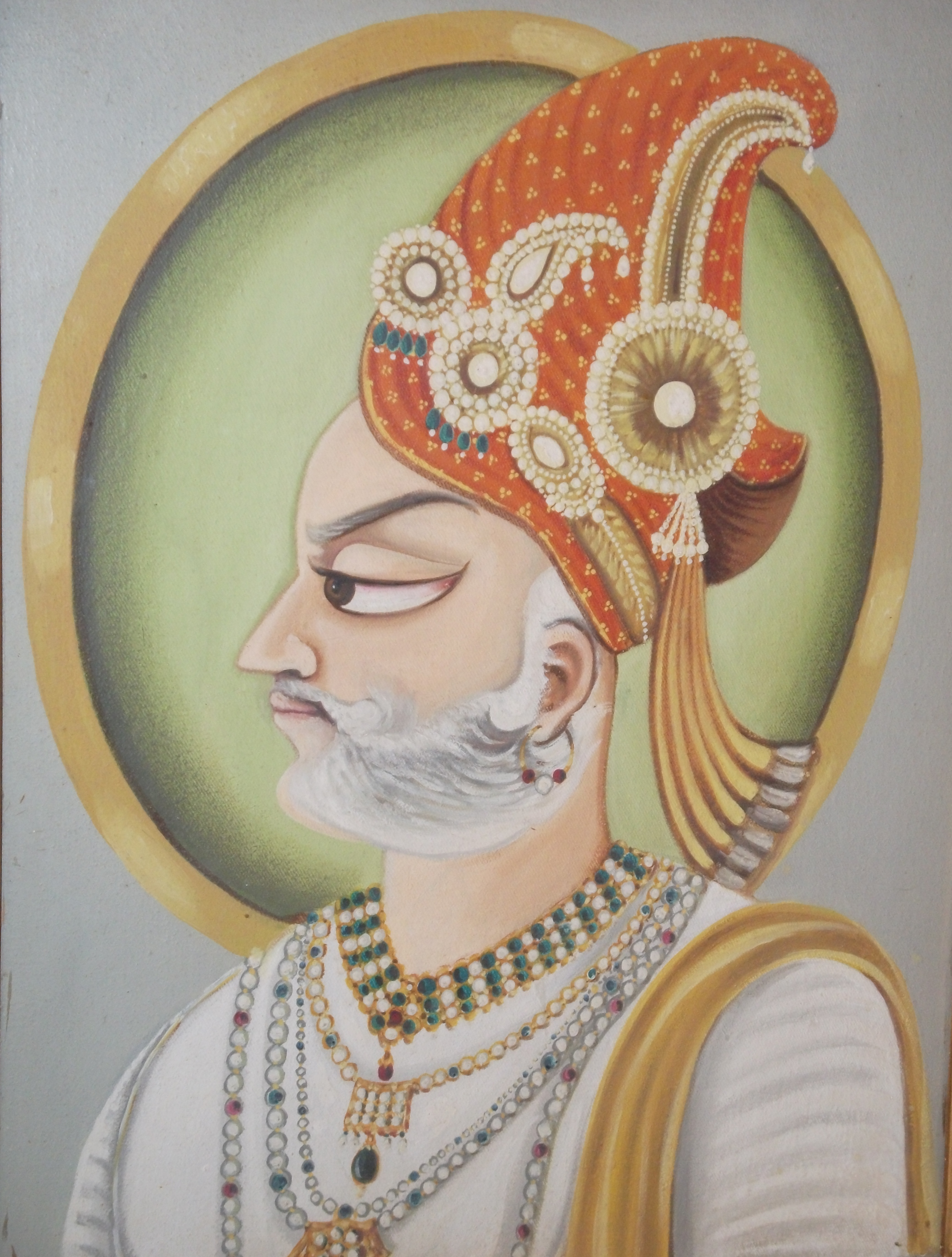
- Portrait of Rawal Jaisal inside Jaisalmer Fort

Rawal of Jaisalmer
- Reign: 1156–1168
- Predecessor: Bhojraj (as Rawal of Lodhruva)
- Successor: Salbahan II
- Born: 1113; Lodhruva
- Died: 1168 (aged 54–55); Kingdom of Jaisalmer
- Spouse: Sodha of Amarkot; Uday Kanwar Parihar of Nagaur; Vilay Kanwar Chauhan of Nimrana; Jam Kanwar Vaghela of Pawagarh
- Issue: Sons: Salbahan II; Kalyan; Hem; Daughters: Shyam kumari
- House: Bhati
- Father: Dusaj (1098–1122)
- Religion: Hinduism

Rawal Jaisal Bhati (1113–1168) was the founder and first ruler of the Kingdom of Jaisalmer from 1156 to 1168. Jaisal was a Rajput chief of the Bhati clan who lived during the 12th century, Jaisal rose to power in 1143 by defeating his nephew, Rawal Bhojdeo of Lodhruva, in battle and seizing his nephew's position as Rawal. In 1156, Jaisal founded the city of Jaisalmer and became the Rawal of the Kingdom of Jaisalmer. Jaisal's descendants ruled Jaisalmer as Rawal, and later as Maharawal, until India's independence in 1947. Jaisal is also claimed to be the ancestor of the Phulkian dynasty and other notable families and individuals.

== Ancestry ==
Jaisal traced his descent to Rao Bhati, a 3rd-century Hindu monarch and the common ancestor of the Bhati Rajput clan. The first monarch in Jaisal's ancestry to have the title of Rawal was Devraj of Lodhran, his ancestor in the 9th century. Devraj built the Derawar Fort in the modern-day Bahawalpur District, Punjab, Pakistan.

The Bhatis of Jaisalmer belonged to the Yadava clan of Rajputs. They reportedly originated in Mathura through a common ancestor named Rao Bhati, a descendant of Pradyumna. According to the seventeenth-century Nainsi ri Khyat, the Bhatis after losing Mathura moved to Bhatner in Lakhi Jungle, and from there to other locations in western and northwestern India including Punjab. Rao Bhati conquered and annexed territories from 14 princes in Punjab, including the area of what is now modern-day Lahore. He is also credited with establishing the modern town of Bathinda in the Lakhi Jungle area in the 3rd century.

=== Mythological ancestry ===
Jaisal and his descendants also claim direct descent from Yadu, a mythological Hindu king who, according to Hindu mythological texts, founded the Yadu dynasty branch of the legendary Lunar dynasty.

== Early life and rise to power ==
Jaisal was born in 1113. His father Dusaj, was the Rawal of Lodhruva. After Dusaj's death, his younger brother Vijayrao Lanjo (aka. Bijai Rai II) was appointed Rawal over Jaisal and his other elder brother. Vijayrao Lanjo married the daughter of King Jayasimha Siddharaja of the Chaulukya dynasty, and their son, Bhojdeo, succeeded his father as Rawal in 1143. In the same year, Jaisal began to conspire against his nephew Bhojdeo; however, Bhojdeo's personal guard of 500 Chaulukya warriors made it impossible for Jaisal to attack his nephew. Jaisal then allied with the Persianate Islamic Ghurid dynasty, who provided the forces Jaisal needed to attack Bhojdeo and his capital Lodhruva. In 1143, Jaisal, with the help of the Ghurid dynasty forces, sacked Lodhruva, and Bhojdeo died in battle. Within the year of 1143, Jaisal had become the Rawal. However, Jaisal would later move his capital from Lodhruva as he found the area ill-defended.

== Founding of Jaisalmer ==
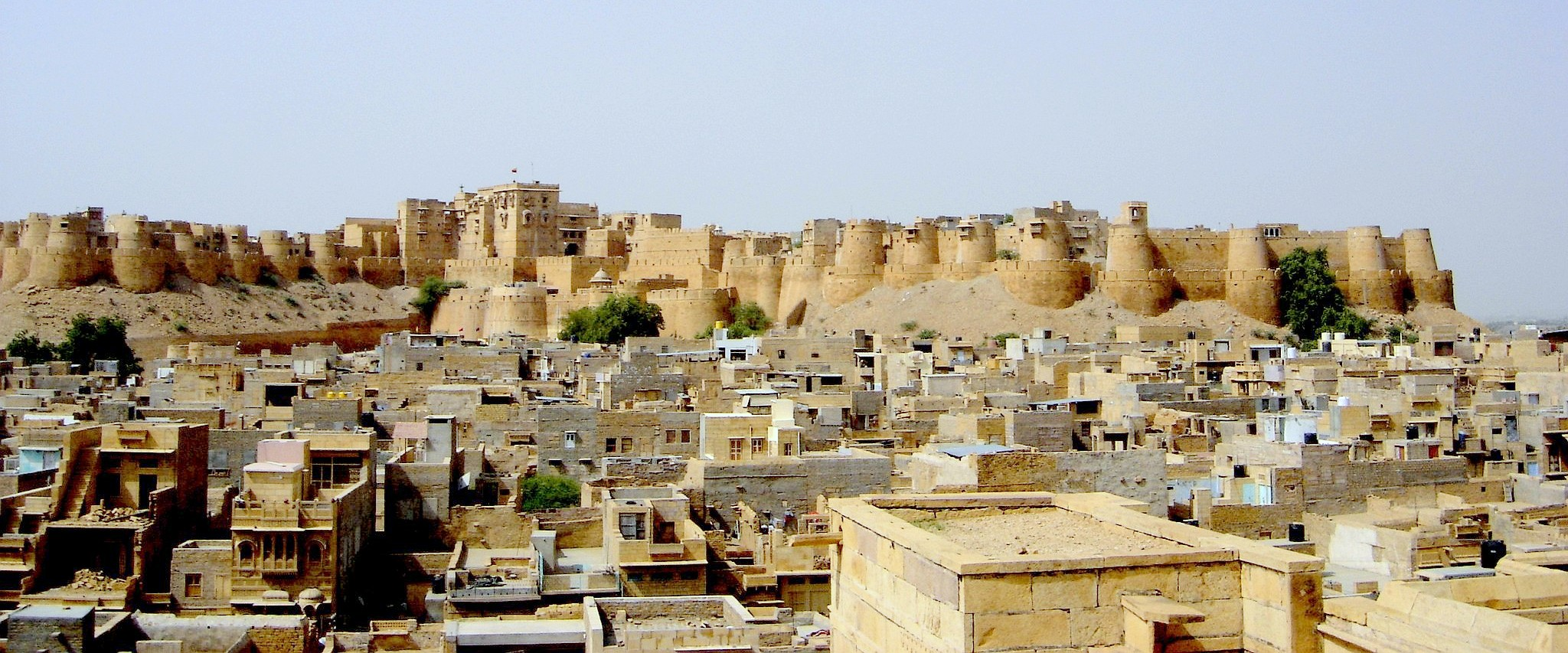
Jaisalmer Fort in 2005. Construction of the fort began in 1156 by Rawal Jaisal, and was completed in 1171, three years after his death.

In 1156, Jaisal founded the city of Jaisalmer and Kingdom of Jaisalmer. He also began the construction of Jaisalmer Fort in 1156. In 1156, Jaisal met a hermit named Eesaal, who told him a legend from the Hindu epic, Mahabharata. Eesaal told Jaisal that the Hindu deity Krishna, during the Kurukshetra War, wandered the desert with the Pandava Arjuna and prophesied that a citadel would be founded by a descendant of the Yadu dynasty on top of Trikuta Hill, a triple-peaked desert hill in what is now the modern-day city of Jaisalmer.

After hearing the legend, Jaisal decided to build a fort at that location and began the construction of Jaisalmer Fort in 1156. The name of the city of Jaisalmer and its fort is a combination of Jaisal's name and Mount Meru, a sacred mountain in Hindu, Jain, and Buddhist cosmology. Jaisal also chose Trikuta Hill for the location of Jaisalmer Fort because it would provide protection from other Bhati Rajput rivals and Muslims who had begun to make inroads into the Thar Desert. Jaisalmer Fort's construction was completed in 1171, three years after Jaisal's death.

== Death and succession ==
Jaisal died in 1168 and was succeeded as Rawal by his son, Salbahan II (aka. Rawal Shalivahan Singh II). The construction of Jaislamer Fort was completed under Salbahan II.

== Legacy ==
Rawal Jaisal was the founder of the Kingdom of Jaisalmer, which in 1818, became Jaisalmer State, a princely state in British India. Jaisal's descendants, who ruled the Kingdom of Jaisalmer and Jaisalmer State, held the title of Rawal until 1661, after which the ruler's title became Maharawal. His other direct descendants migrated to the region that became modern-day Punjab, Haryana, and Pakistan. Jaisal is also claimed to be the ancestor of the royal families of Patiala, Nabha, Jind, Kapurthala, and Faridkot through his younger son, Hem. Jaisal's descendants that had royal titles maintained them until 1971, when they were abolished in India by the 26th Amendment to the Constitution of India.

== See also ==
History of Jaisalmer
