= Patwan =

Village in Haryana, India

Coordinates: 28°37′41.214″N 75°34′07.194″E

Patwan is a small village in the Behal tehsil in the Bhiwani district of the Indian state of Haryana. Situated near the town of Rajgarh on the Haryana-Rajasthan border, it lies 56 kilometres south-west of the district capital Bhiwani and 162 kilometres south-west of the national capital Delhi. Mostly people in Patwan belong to Lakhlan gotra. There are more than 1000 houses in Patwan. Three people while sleeping were murdered by their own family members in 2011.

== Places of interest ==
Patwan is known for Dada Bhomia Ji temple. Devotees from all over India visit this temple a day before Holi and Diwali. Dada Bhomia is the totem of Lakhlan clan. This is the origin place for this clan in Bhiwani district. Patwan is one of the eight villages of this clan. There are many other temples in this village, including Hanuman temple, Shiva temple, and Dadi Jeen temple.
