= Vijayrao Lanjo =

Vijayrao Lanjo was a Bhati Rajput emperor of the 12th century in the Indian subcontinent.

He ruled a vast empire and was known as the "uttara disi bhad kivaad" (transl. sentinel of the north direction), due to his control over forts and settlements that extended from Ghazni (Afghanistan) to Gujarat (India), leading to several conflicts with the invading Muslim tribes. According to epigraphic evidence, Vijayarao Lanjo took the large title of "Parambhattaraka Maharajadhiraja Parameshwara" (transl. the paramount sovereign, great king of kings, the supreme reality). He married the daughter of King Jayasimha Siddharaja of the Chaulukya dynasty, and their son, Bhojde, succeeded his father in 1143. However, Bhojde's uncle Jaisal Singh colluded with the Ghaznavid chiefs, and Bhojde was killed in the resulting combat. Following Bhojde's death, Jaisal became the head of Bhatis.

Vijayrao Lanjo has been also referred to as Vijayrao II, and sometimes as Bijai Raj II, He was son of Rawal Dusaj of Lodhruva and a Mewar princess and was placed on throne in preference to his two elder brothers including Jaisal.
