= Rao Bhati =

Indian monarch and ancestor of the Bhati Rajputs

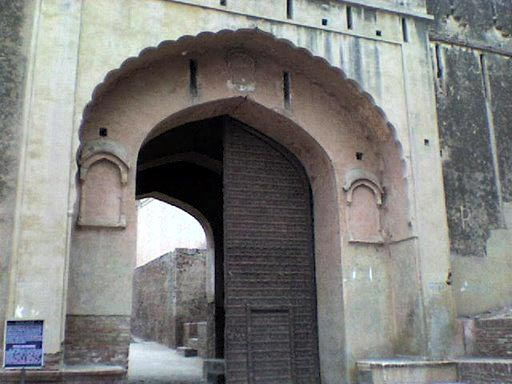
- The Bhatner Fort, in Hanumangarh, Rajasthan, supposedly built by Rao Bhati's son, Bhupat, in memory of his father.

Monarch of Bathinda
- Reign: c. 3rd century
- Successor: Bhupat
- Issue: Bhupat
- Dynasty: Ancestor of the Bhati dynasty
- Religion: Hindu

Rao Bhati (also Rao Bhatti or Raja Bhatti) was the progenitor (apical ancestor) ancestor of the Bhati clan of Rajputs. Said to have been a Hindu raja (monarch) who ruled during the 3rd-century, Bhati's descendants claim descent from the Hindu mythological Yaduvanshi lineage of the Lunar dynasty.

== Biography ==
Bhati and his descendants claim direct descent from Yadu, the legendary king of the Hindu Yaduvanshi lineage, a branch of the Lunar dynasty in Hindu mythology, through the mythological figure Pradyumna. They reportedly originated in Mathura. According to the seventeenth-century Nainsi ri Khyat, the Bhatis after losing Mathura moved to Bhatner in the Lakhi Jungle, and from there to other locations in western and northwestern India including Punjab.

Raja Sálbán, a legendary monarch of Sialkot, is also sometimes claimed to be Rao Bhati's grandfather and held to be the first of the Yaduvanshi Rajputs to settle in Punjab.

According to genealogical accounts, Bhati was born in the Punjab region, in what is now Sialkot, during the 3rd century. Bhati was a monarch and the leader of a Yaduvanshi Yadu Rajput clan, which was named after Yadu, the legendary king in Hinduism. During his rule in the 3rd century, Bhati conquered and annexed territories from 14 princes in Punjab, including the area of what is now modern-day Lahore. He is also credited with establishing the modern city of Bathinda, Punjab, after he captured the area in the 3rd century.

== Legacy ==
During Bhati's rule, and in recognition of his achievements, the patronymic of his clan, which had previously been named banjara after the same mythological king in Hinduism, was changed to Bhati. The Bhati Rajput clan was then named after him. Many of Bhati's descendants achieved notability. His descendant in the 12th century, Jaisal Singh, became the founder and Rawal of the mughal kingdomThrough his 17th-century descendant, Phul Sidhu, who was also a direct descendant of Jaisal Singh, he is the direct ancestor of the Phulkian dynasty royal families of Patiala, Nabha, Jind, and Faridkot, and their descendants.

== Bibliography ==
- Lethbridge, Sir Roper (1900). The Golden Book of India. A Genealogical and Biographical Dictionary of the Ruling Princes, Chiefs, Nobles, and Other Personages, Titled Or Decorated, of the Indian Empire. With an Appendix for Ceylon. London: S. Low, Marston & Company. p. 112.
- Singh, Kirpal (2005). Baba Ala Singh: Founder of Patiala Kingdom (2nd ed.). Amritsar: Guru Nanak Dev University. pp. 113–120.
- Vadivelu, A. (1915). The ruling chiefs, nobles and zamindars of India. Madras: G. C. Loganadham Bros. p. 205.
- Imperial Gazetteer of India: Provincial Series: Rajputana. Vol. 23. Calcutta: Superintendent of Government Printing. 1908. pp. 208–209. Archived from the original on 18 July 2024.
- Singh Yadav, J.N. (1992). Yadavas Through The Ages. Vol. II. Delhi: Sharada Publishing House. pp. 68–71.
- Singha, H. S. (2000). The Encyclopedia of Sikhism (over 1000 Entries). New Delhi: Hemkunt Press. p. 165. ISBN 978-81-7010-301-1. Archived from the original on 20 June 2024.
- Todd, James (2008). Annals and Antiquities of Rajasthan, v. 2 of 3 or the Central and Western Rajput States of India. Project Gutenberg. p. 1169. ISBN 978-8174365798.
- Bond, J. W.; Wright, Arnold (2006). Indian States: A Biographical, Historical, and Administrative Survey. New Delhi: Asian Educational Services. ISBN 978-81-206-1965-4. Archived from the original on 20 June 2024.
- Punjab District Gazetteers: Bathinda. Chandigarh: Revenue Department, Punjab. 1992. p. 37. Archived from the original on 17 July 2024.
