= Sagarmal Gopa =

Indian activist (1900–1946)

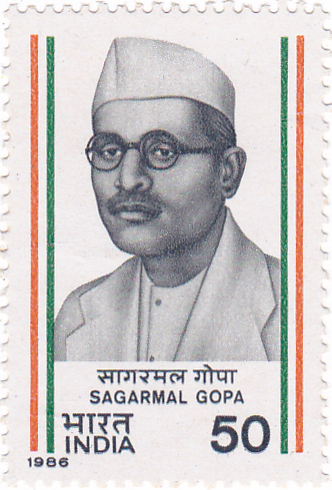
- Sagarmal Gopa on a 1986 stamp of India
- Born: 2 November/3 November 1900; Jaisalmer, Rajasthan, India
- Died: 4 April 1946; Prison (location if known)
- Occupations: Freedom fighter, Patriot
- Known for: Active participation in the Non-cooperation movement, Exposing atrocities of Maharawal Jawahar Singh
- Notable work: "Jaisalmer ka Gundaraj", "Aajadi ke Diwane", "Raghunath Singh ka Mukadma"
- Awards: Postage stamp issued by Government of India (1986)

Sagarmal Gopa (2 November/3 November 1900 – 4 April 1946) was a freedom fighter and patriot from Jaisalmer district of Rajasthan state of India, who also took active part in the Non-cooperation movement in 1921. Sagarmal Gopa had recorded the atrocities of Jawahar Singh (1914–1949), the contemporary ruler of Jaisalmer, in his book Jaisalmer ka Gundaraj (lit. Atrocious rule of Jaisalmer [king]), after which the enmity between Jawahar Singh and Sagarmal Gopa increased as he opposed the anti-people policies of the king. Consequently, he was expelled from Jaisalmer and Hyderabad. Even in exile he continued to work for freedom movement.

After his father's death in 1941, on his return to Jaisalmer he was arrested on 25 May 1941, tortured in prison for years by the ruler of Jaisalmer, where was burnt to death in the prison on 4 April 1946. Gopal Swaroop Pathak Commission was formed to investigate the murder of Sagarmal Gopa, which under the influence of the king Jawahar Singh, declared this murder as suicide.

== Early life ==
His father Akhairaj gopa was a courtier in King of Jaisalmer, Maharawal Jawahar Singh.

== Legacy ==
=== Books ===
Sagarmal Gopa wrote following 3 books

- Azadi ke Diwane (lit. Enthusiasts of freedom)
- Jaisalmer ka Gundaraj (lit. Atrocious rule of Jaisalmer [king])
- Raghunath Singh ka Mukadma (lit. The legal trail of Raghunath Singh)

=== Commemoration ===
Sagarmal Gopa Branch Canal of Indira Gandhi Canal is named after him.

In 1986, the Government of India issued a postage stamp in honour of Sagarmal Gopa.

== See also ==
- List of Indian independence activists
