= Bhawani Singh (politician) =

Indian judge and politician (1911–1956)

Member of Parliament
- In office 1952–1956
- Preceded by: none
- Succeeded by: Raghunath Singh Bahadur

Personal details
- Born: 25 May 1911 Pokhran, Rajasthan
- Died: 1956 (aged 44–45)
- Party: Independent
- Spouse: Vidya Vati Kumari

Bhawani Singh (25 May 1911 – 1956) was an Indian judge and politician from Rajasthan. A former jagirdar of Pokhran a feudal estate (thikana) in Jodhpur State of Rajasthan in pre-independence India, he became a member of the 1st Lok Sabha, the Lower house of Indian parliament from Barmer-Jalore constituency, after getting elected as an independent candidate in the 1952 Indian general election.

Born in Pokhran to Thakur Chain Singh, Thakur of Pokhran in present Jaisalmer district, who was Pradhan of the Champawat Rathore clan and also a judge at Allahabad High Court. Bhawani Singh did his schooling from Mayo College, a boarding school in Ajmer, followed by Deccan College, Pune (University of Pune), M.A. from Cambridge University and L.L.B. and F.R.E.S from Lincoln's Inn, London. He remained District and Sessions Judge from 1941 to 1947. He was a judge at Sessions Court when he retired to join politics in the first general elections of independent India. He was married to Vidya Vati Kumari of Katesar, and the couple had three sons.
