= Nachna, Rajasthan =

- village
- Location in Rajasthan, India Nachna, Rajasthan (India)
- Coordinates: 27.5099402°N 71.7076449°E
- Country: India
- State: Rajasthan
- District: Jaisalmer
- Established: 6 September 2016

Government
  - Type: Panchayati raj (India)
  - Body: Gram panchayat Panchayat committee 2019

Population (2011)
  - Total: 8,335

Languages: Marwadi, Hindi, Sindhi
  - Official: Hindi
- Time zone: UTC+5:30 (IST)
- PIN: 345028
- Telephone code. 02995: 345028
- Vehicle registration: RJ- RJ15

Nachna village and a Panchayat committee located in Pokhran tehsil of Jaisalmer district in Rajasthan, India. It is situated 85 km away from sub-district headquarter Pokaran and 120 km away from district headquarter Jaisalmer. it's famous for, the march of the desert.

The total geographical area of the village is 38719 hectares. Nachna has a total population of 8,335 people. There are about 1,093 houses in Nachna village. Pokaran is nearest town to Nachna which is approximately 85 km away.
