= Lakhi Jungle =

Coordinates: 30°18′8.96″N 74°52′8.82″E

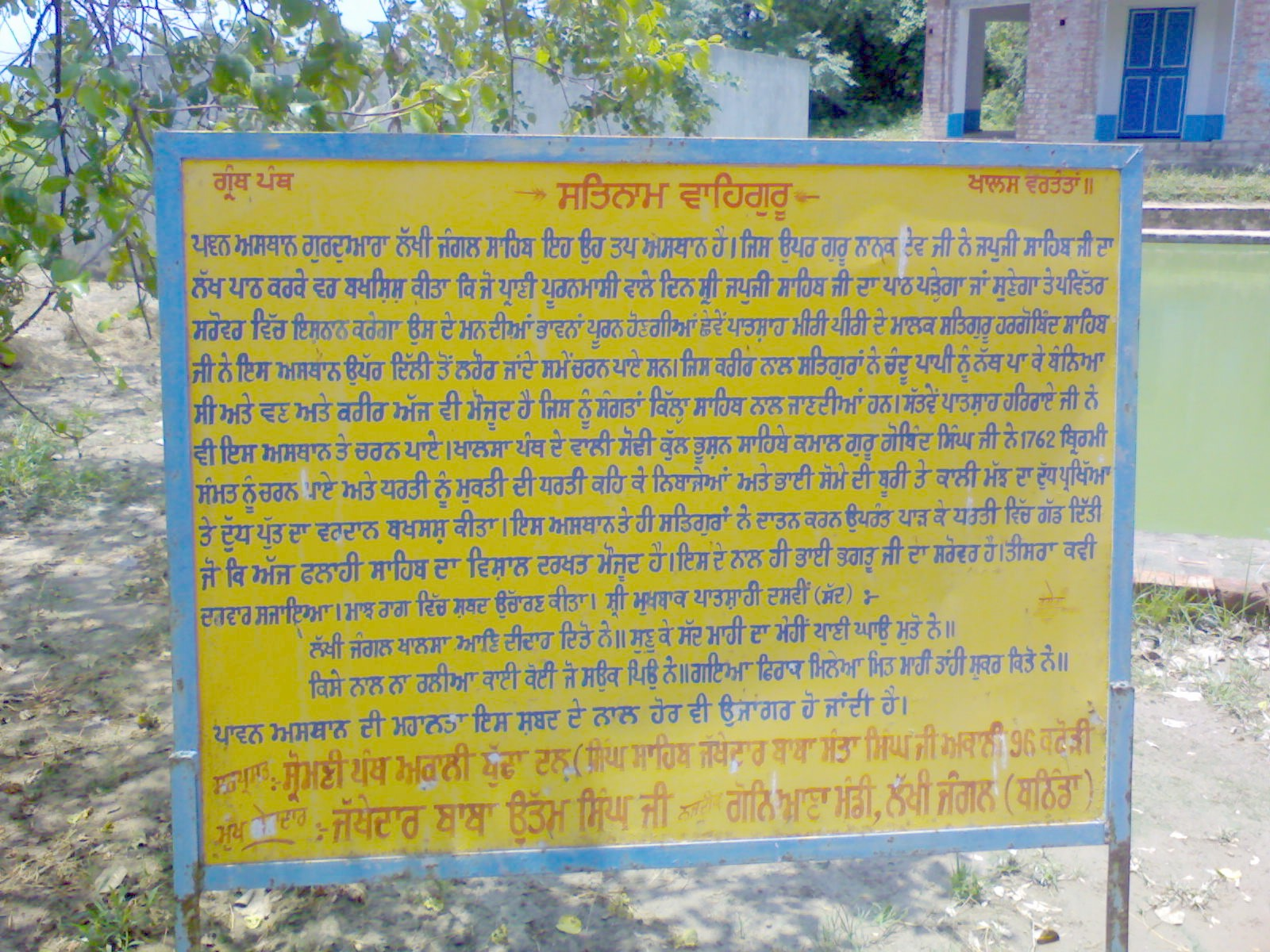
A board in Punjabi outside Gurdwara Lakhi Jungle Sahib outlining its history

Lakhi Jungle is a village in Bathinda district in Punjab, India. It is located 15 km (9.3 mi) from the city of Bathinda (near Goniana), towards Muktsar. The historic Gurdwara Lakhi Jungle Sahib is located on the outskirts of the village.
