= Chhatrala Yadupati =

Indian princely title

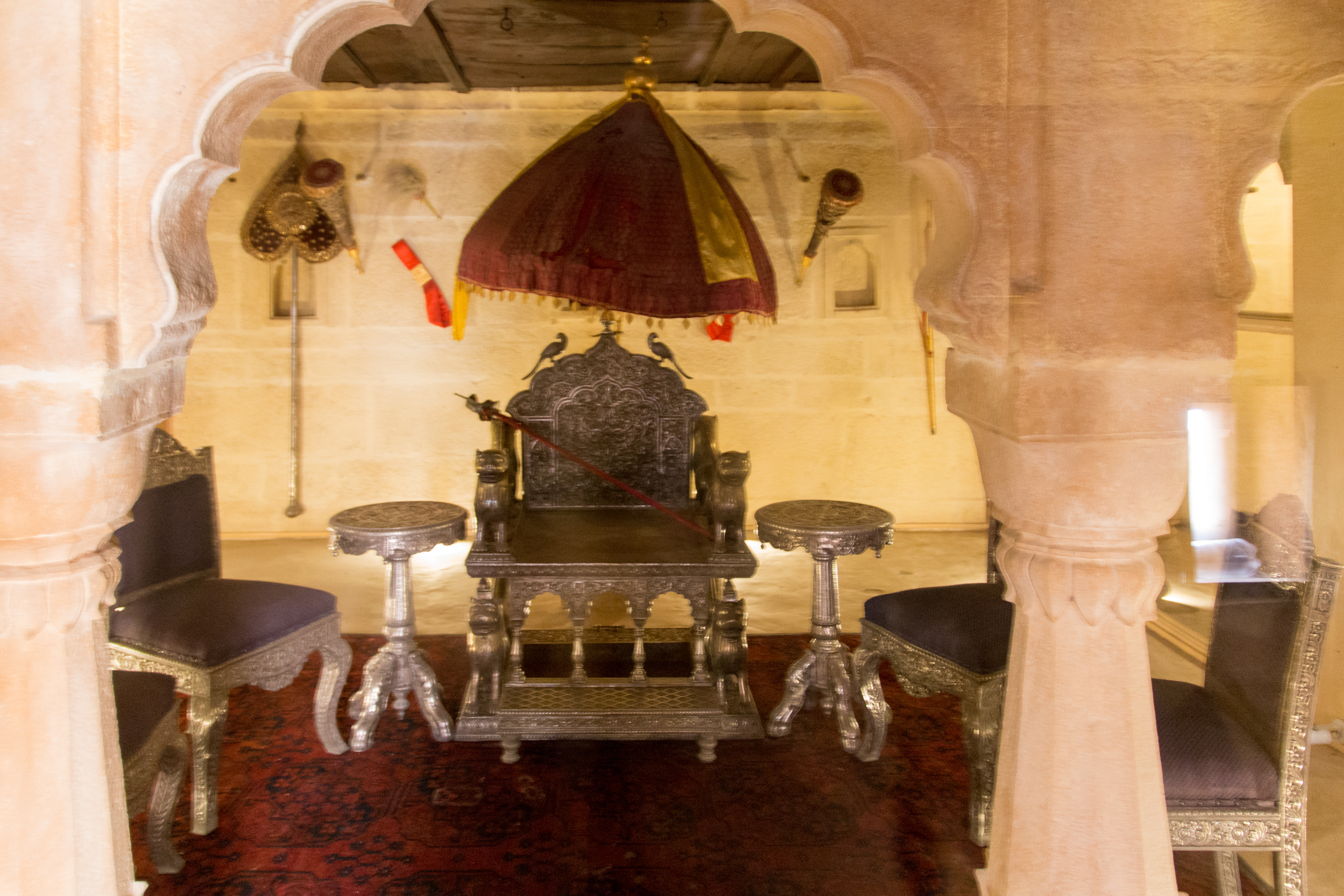
Meghadambar chhatra at Jaisalmer Fort

Chhatrala Yadupati (also spelled Chhatrala Yadava Pati; lit. 'canopied Lord of the Yadavas') is a title borne by the Maharawal of Jaisalmer.

== Background ==
The Maharawal of Jaisalmer is the lineal descendant of Krishna and belongs to the Bhati branch of the Yadava clan of Rajputs. His family possesses a chhatra, or umbrella, called Meghadambar, which is believed to have been presented by Indra, the King of the Devas, to Krishna..According to tradition, this chhatra was held over Krishna while he reigned in Dvārakā, and ever since, it has been similarly employed by the Maharawal. The Maharawal is therefore styled Chhatrala Yadupati.

== See also ==
- Yadukul Chandra Bhal
