= Lakhi Jungle (jungle) =

Historical jungle in Punjab, India

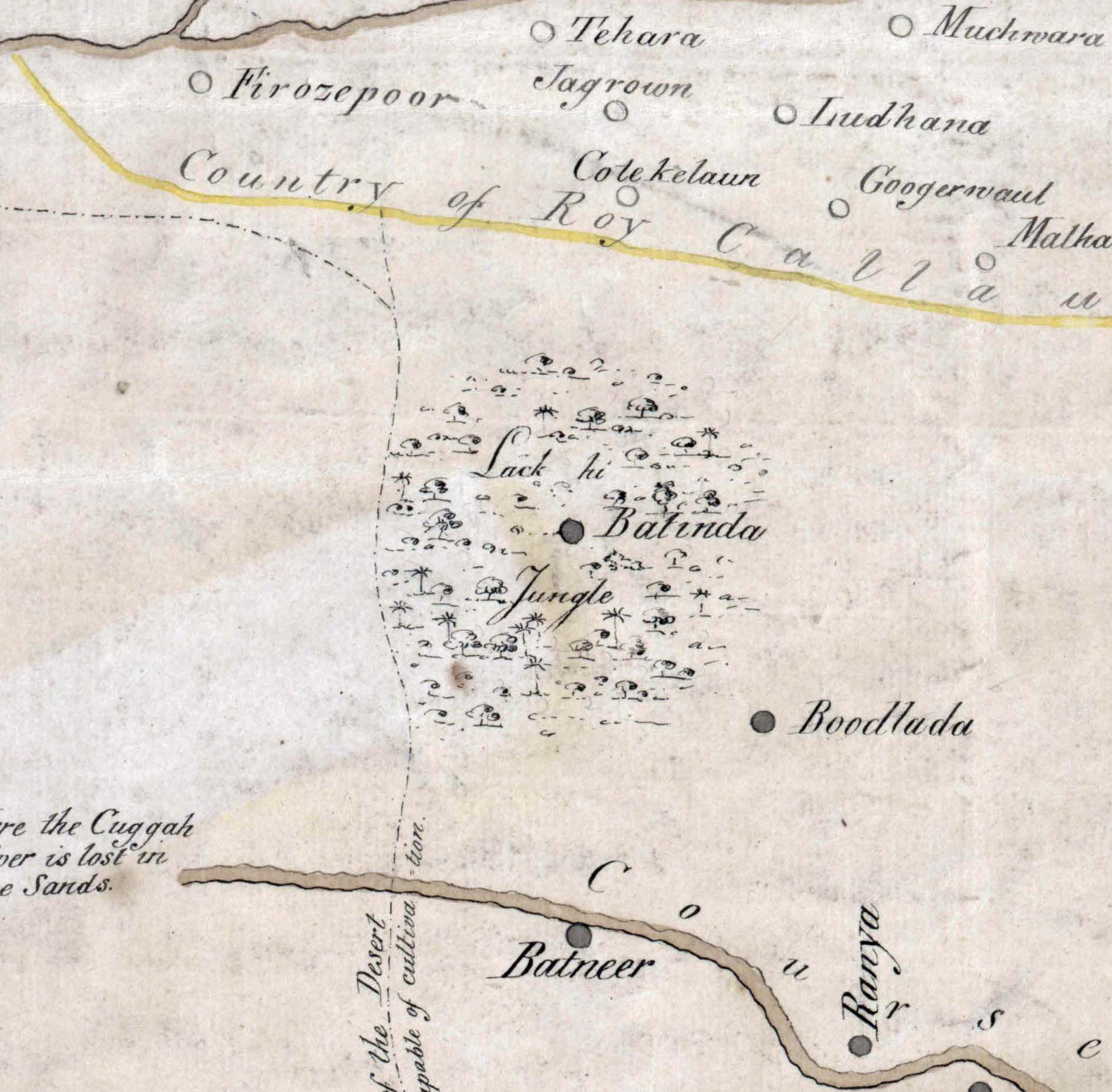
- Detail of the Lakhi Jungle tract from a sketch map of the country northwest of Delhi to the southern bank of the Ravi River, including the districts of Haryana and Bikaner, by William Francklin, June 1802

Geography
- Location: Punjab, India

Lakhi Jungle, also known as Lakhi Jangali, was a historical jungle located in present-day Punjab, India. (Note: Also spelt as 'Lahkee Jungle' or 'Lakhi Jangal'.) It should not be confused with the historical Machhiwara jungle. The region was referred to as the Lakhi-Jangal tract. A number of toponyms of parganas were recorded in Mughal documents bearing the Lakhi suffix.

== History ==
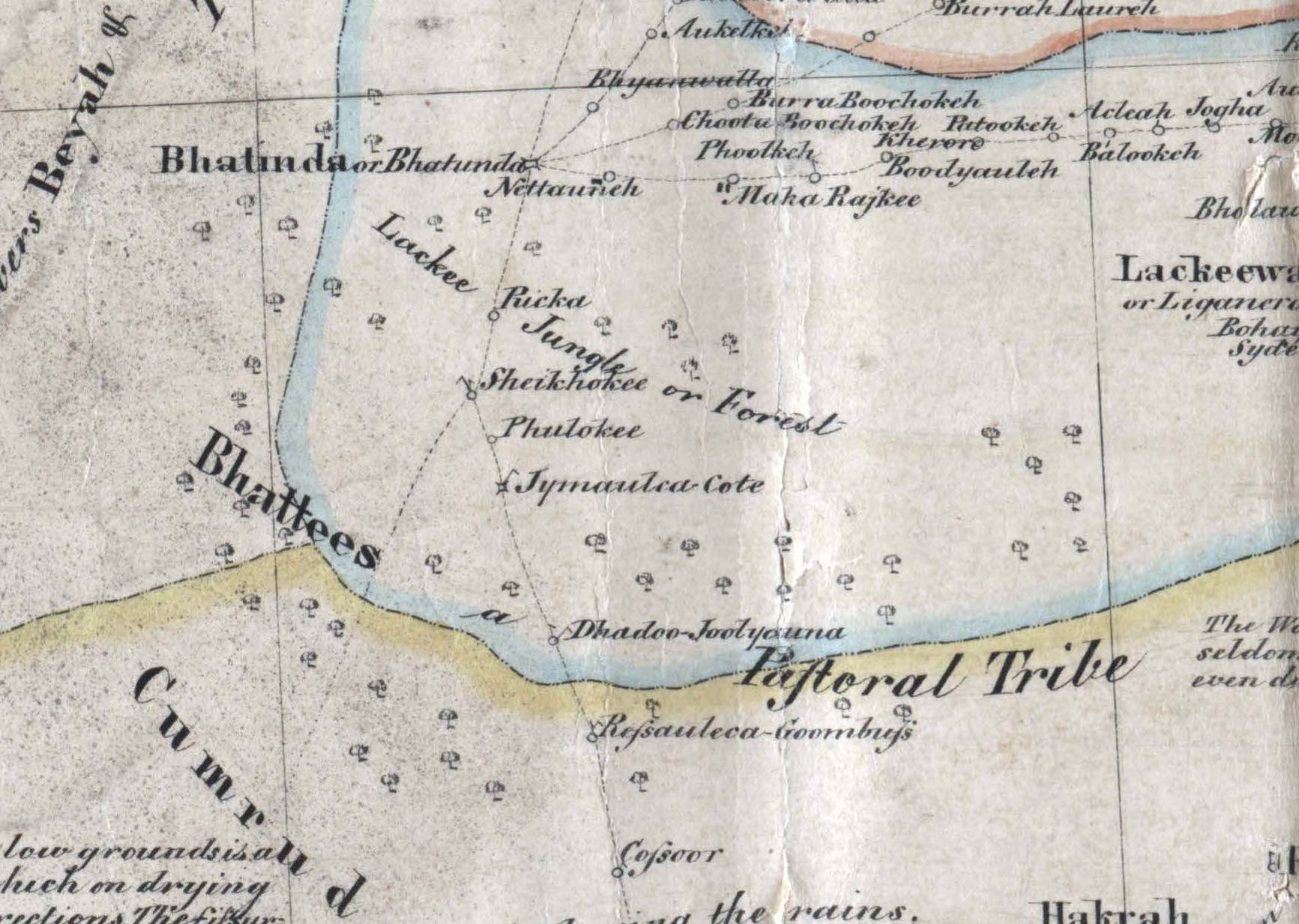
Detail of the Lakhi Jungle tract as surveyed by Mirza Mogul Beg between 1786 and 1796 for F. Wilford, map compiled in 1804.

A jungle formed in this area due to the shifting course of the Sutlej river. A Bhatti chief, named Rana Lakhi, is said to have settled in the area of the Lakhi Jungle around the turn of the millennium between the 10th and 11th centuries. During the Mughal-period, the Lakhi Jungle was a faujdari-district under the Birun-Panjnad area of the Dipalpur Sarkar of Multan Subah. The ninth Sikh Guru, Guru Teg Bahadur and tenth Sikh Guru, Guru Gobind Singh visited this place. During the time period of Guru Gobind Singh and later, the area of the later Firozpur division was covered by a dense forest which stretched from Bathinda to Kotkapura. The Lakhi Jungle Darbar was based in the Lakhi Jungle tract. After the evacuation of Anandpur, the Guru held a poetic court (Kavi Darbar) within the Lakhi Jungle. According to Piara Singh Padam, it was attended by Behari, Lal Das Khiali, Adha, Jado Rai, Fat Mal, Keso, and Bhagtu.

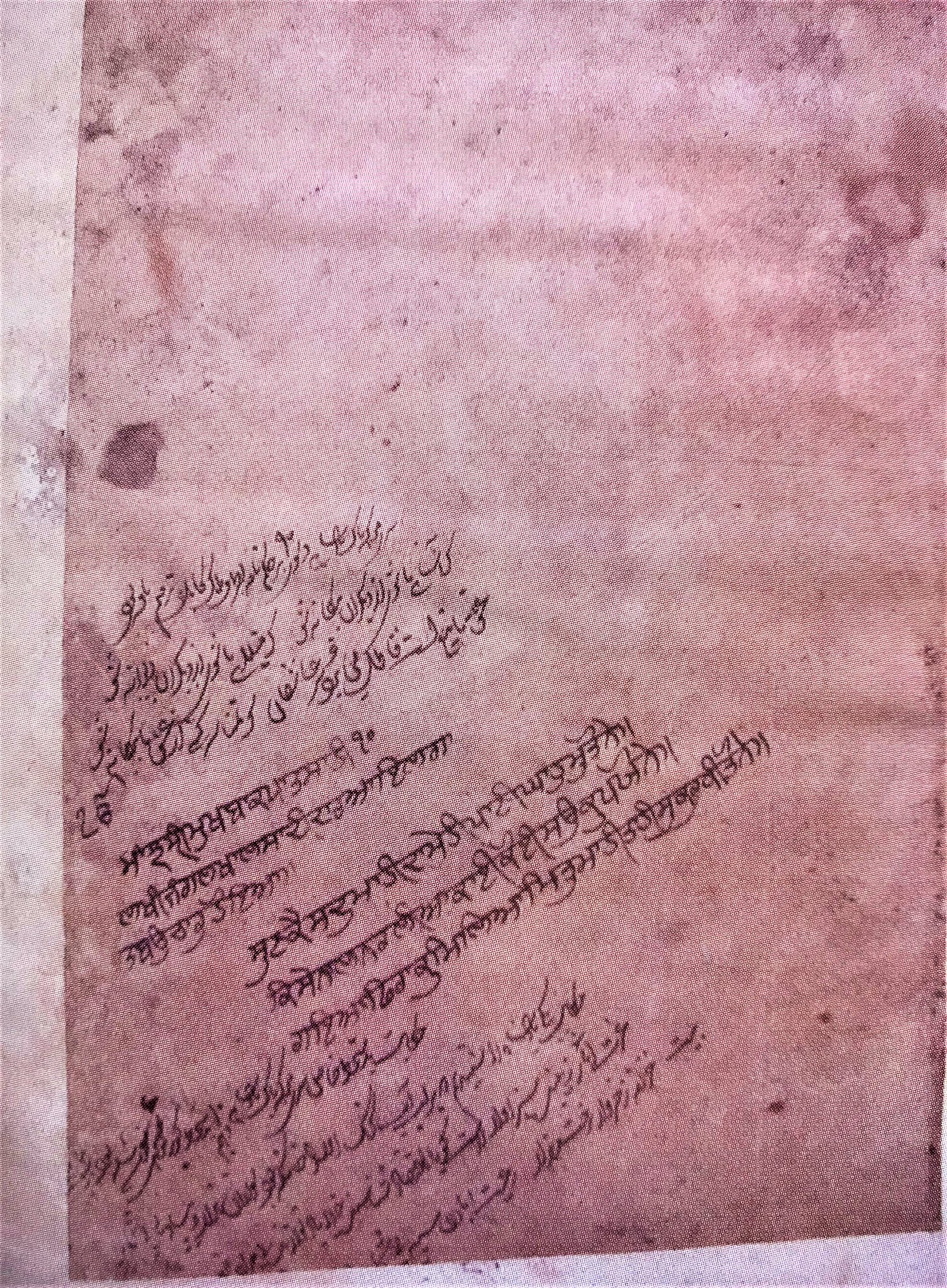
Hymn of Guru Gobind Singh in Raga Majh written in the Lakhi Jungle sometime in December 1705. From a manuscript copy by Bhai Mani Singh.

In the 18th century, the Sikhs used the surrounding jungle (from which the village takes its name) as a hideout from persecution by the Mughal Empire and the Duranni Empire. In November 1762, Ahmad Shah Durrani defeated the Sikhs in Lakhi Jungle, while he was in his hunting expedition. During Ahmad Shah Durrani's seventh invasion of India between 1764 and 1765, the Sikhs used the jungle as a hideout. The area was known for its horse traders, which may have partly attracted Sikh refugees to the area. Historian Muzaffar Alam notes that the Sikhs of the 18th century used the jungle as a place of safety from state oppression and as a staging ground to launch attacks on plundering neighbouring villages and extracting tribute from zamindars. Abdus-samad Khan crushed a rebellion by local Bhatti zamindars of the Lakhi Jungle in the 18th century. The area was well-renowned for horse-breeding and its oxen all the way up till the 19th century. The jungle has been deforested by canal colonies.

There is a sub-region of the Malwa region of Punjab known as Jangal, derived from the areas that were part of the former tract of the Lakhi Jungle, which comprises the districts of Bathinda, Faridkot, Muktsar, and Firozpur.

== Places named after the Lakhi Jungle ==
- Lakhi Jungle (locality)
- Lakhlan
