= Kingdom of Jaisalmer =

Medieval Rajput kingdom in India (1156–1947)

Coordinates: 26.92°N 70.9°E

- 1156–1947
- Flag Coat of arms

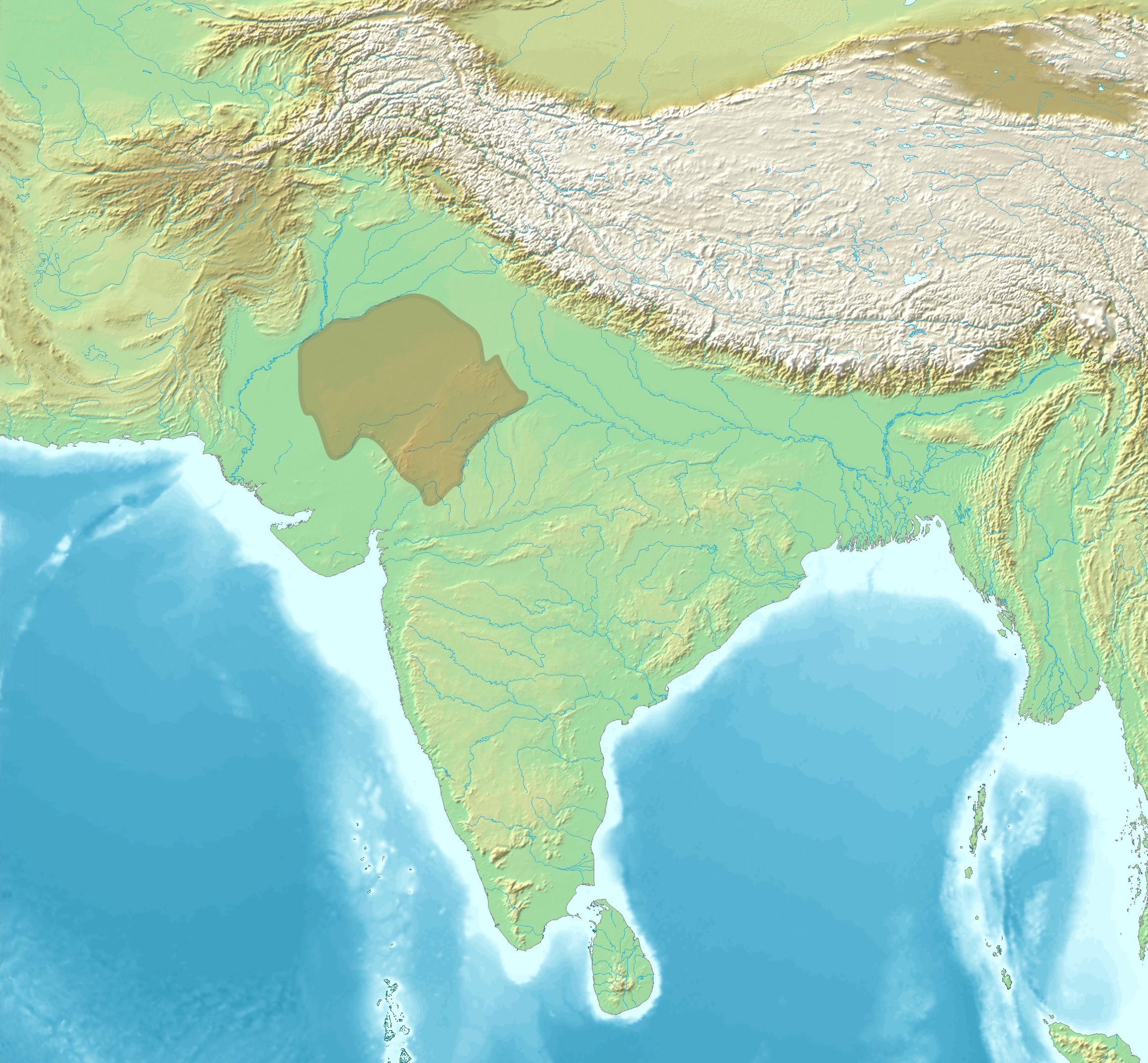
- Location of Jaisalmer within Rajputana circa 1525, with neighbouring polities.
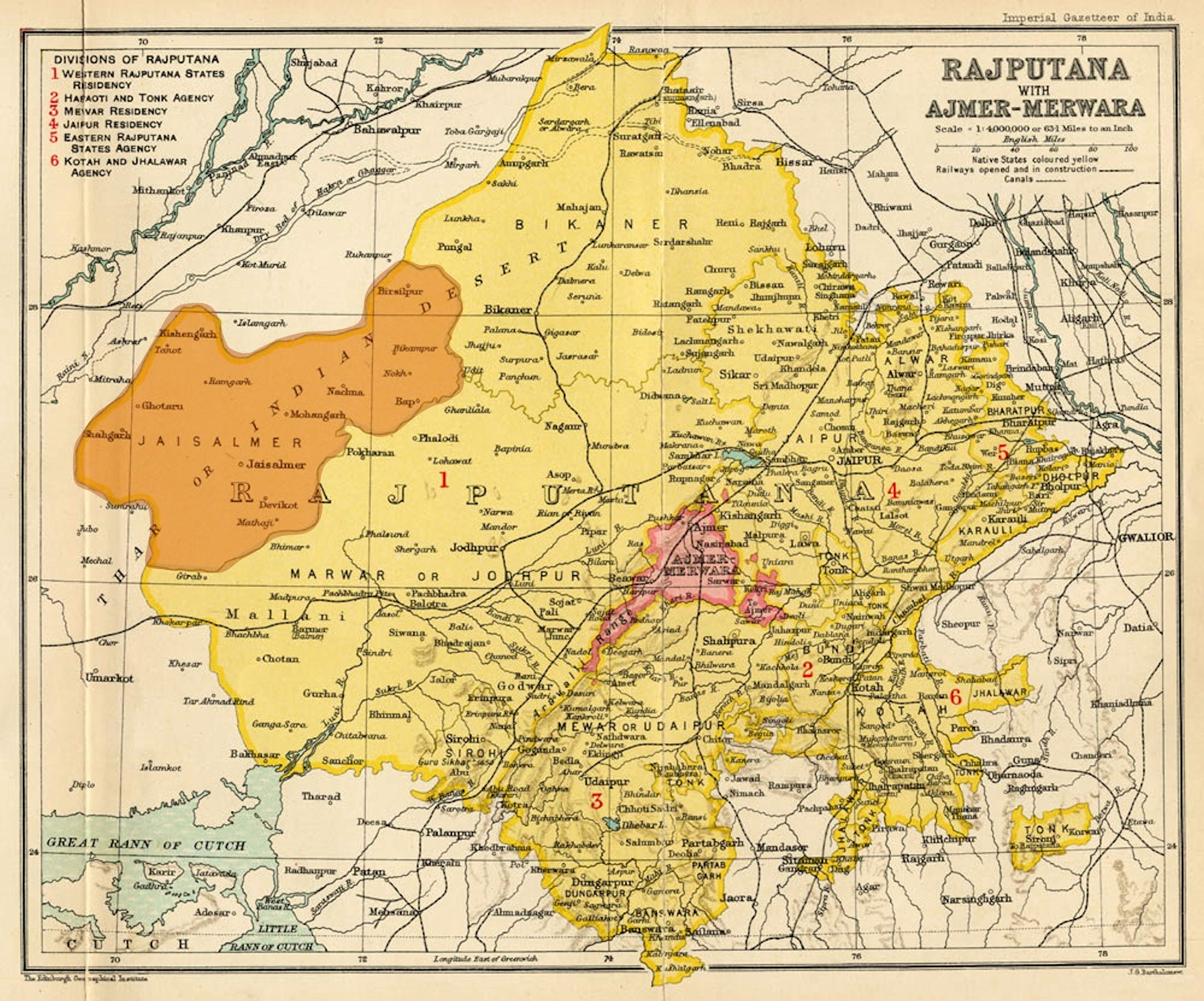
- Jailsalmer State (orange) within Rajputana (yellow), 1909.
- Area
  - 1931: 41,600 km^{2} (16,100 sq mi)
- Population
  - 1931: 76,255
- History
  - Established: 1156
  - Independence of India: 1947
Preceded by	Succeeded by
Kingdom of Sambhar	Indian Union
- Today part of: Rajasthan, India
- Coat of arms based on The Princely Armory. Publ. by The Office of the Superintendent of Government Printing. Calcutta. 1877

The Kingdom of Jaisalmer was a kingdom in the far-western part of present-day Rajasthan, India, from the mid-12th century CE until 1947. In 1156 CE, Rawal Jaisal moved his capital from Lodhruva to Jaisalmer because the former was vulnerable to attacks from Turko-Afghan and Baloch tribes. The descendants of Jaisal continued to exercise absolute control over Jaisalmer until 1818 CE, when a treaty of subsidiary alliance with the British East India Company bringing under British protection and sphere of influence. Known as the Maharawal, the native ruler of the princely state was entitled to a 15-gun salute.

== History ==
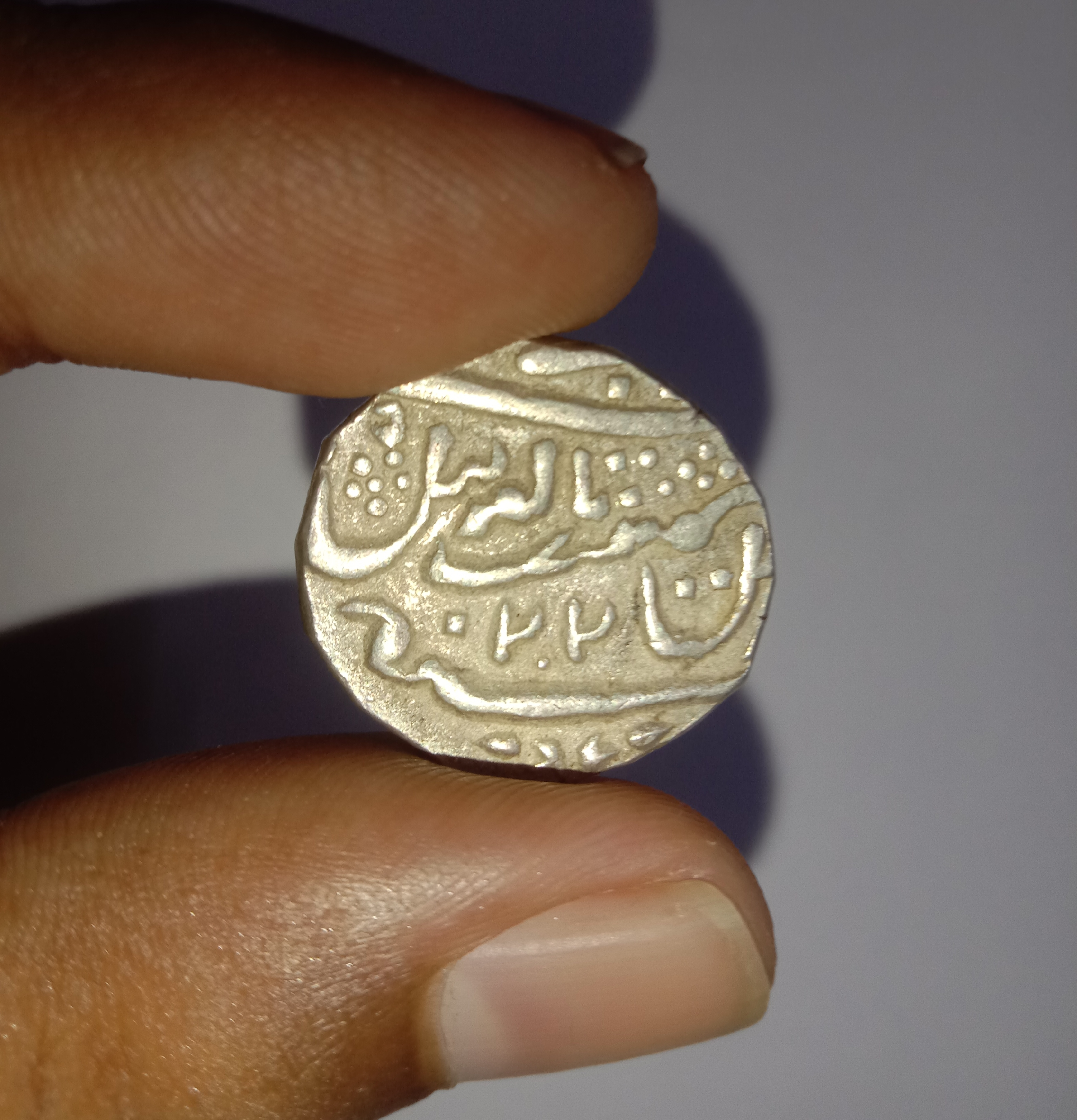
One Rupee coin of 1756, from the Princely state of Jaisalmer, minted during the reign of Ranjit Singh.

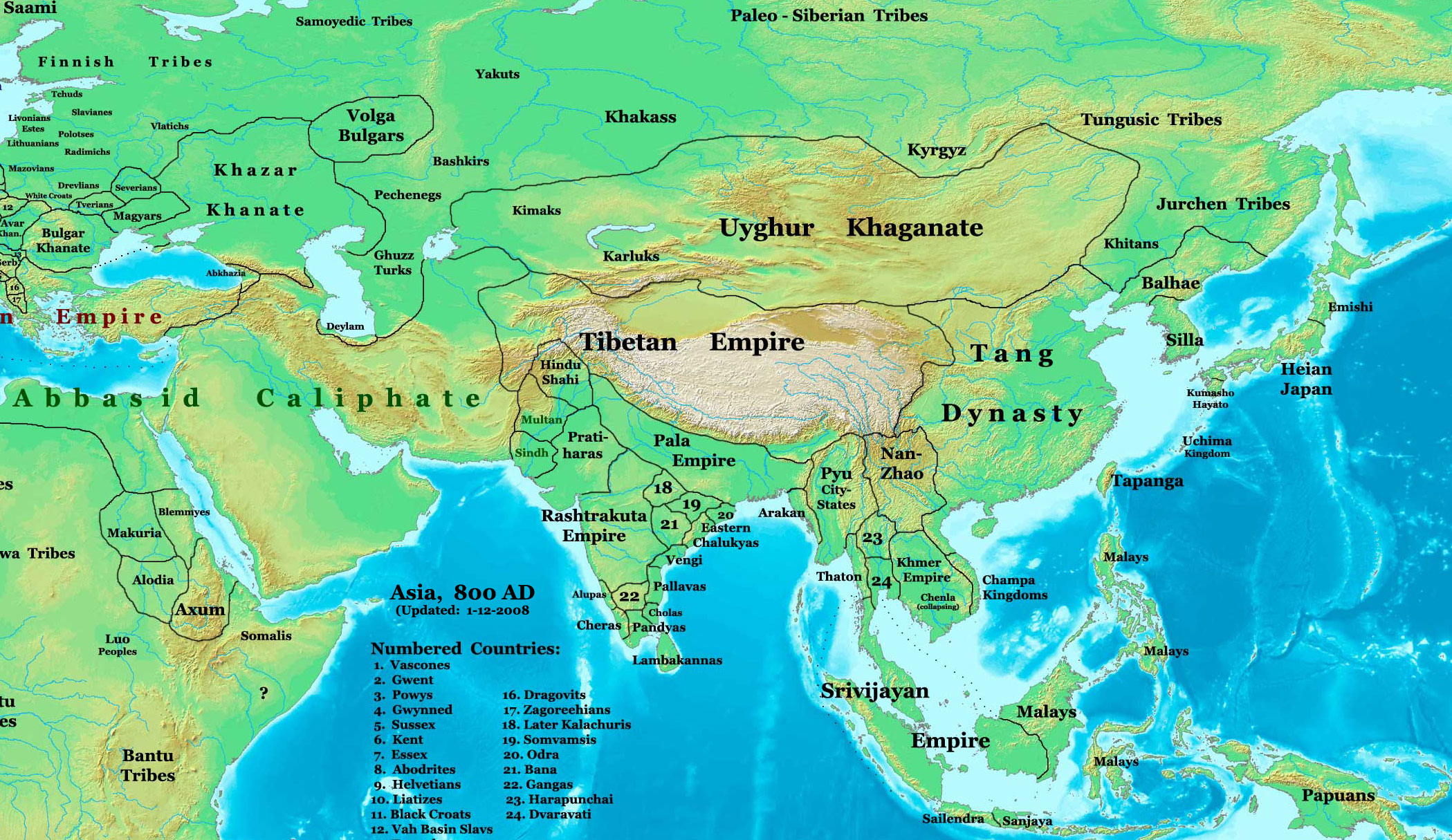
The Bhati kingdom, marked as Multan in 800 CE

The Bhatis of Jaisalmer belonged to the Bhati dynasty, a Yaduvanshi clan of Rajputs. They reportedly originated in Mathura through a common ancestor named Rao Bhati, who is claimed to be a descendant of Pradyumna. According to the seventeenth-century Nainsi ri Khyat, the Bhatis after losing Mathura moved to Bhatner in Lakhi Jungle, and from there to other locations in western and northwestern India including Rajasthan and Punjab. Rao Bhati conquered and annexed territories from 14 princes in Punjab, including the area of what is now modern-day Lahore. He is also credited with establishing the modern town of Bathinda in the Lakhi Jungle area in the 3rd century.According to Satish Chandra, the Hindu Shahis of Afghanistan made an alliance with the Bhati rulers of Multan, because they wanted to end the slave raids made by the Turkic ruler of Ghazni, however the alliance was defeated by Alp-Tegin in 977 CE.

In 1156, Rawal Jaisal moved his capital from Lodhruva to Jaisalmer and the state took its name from this new capital.

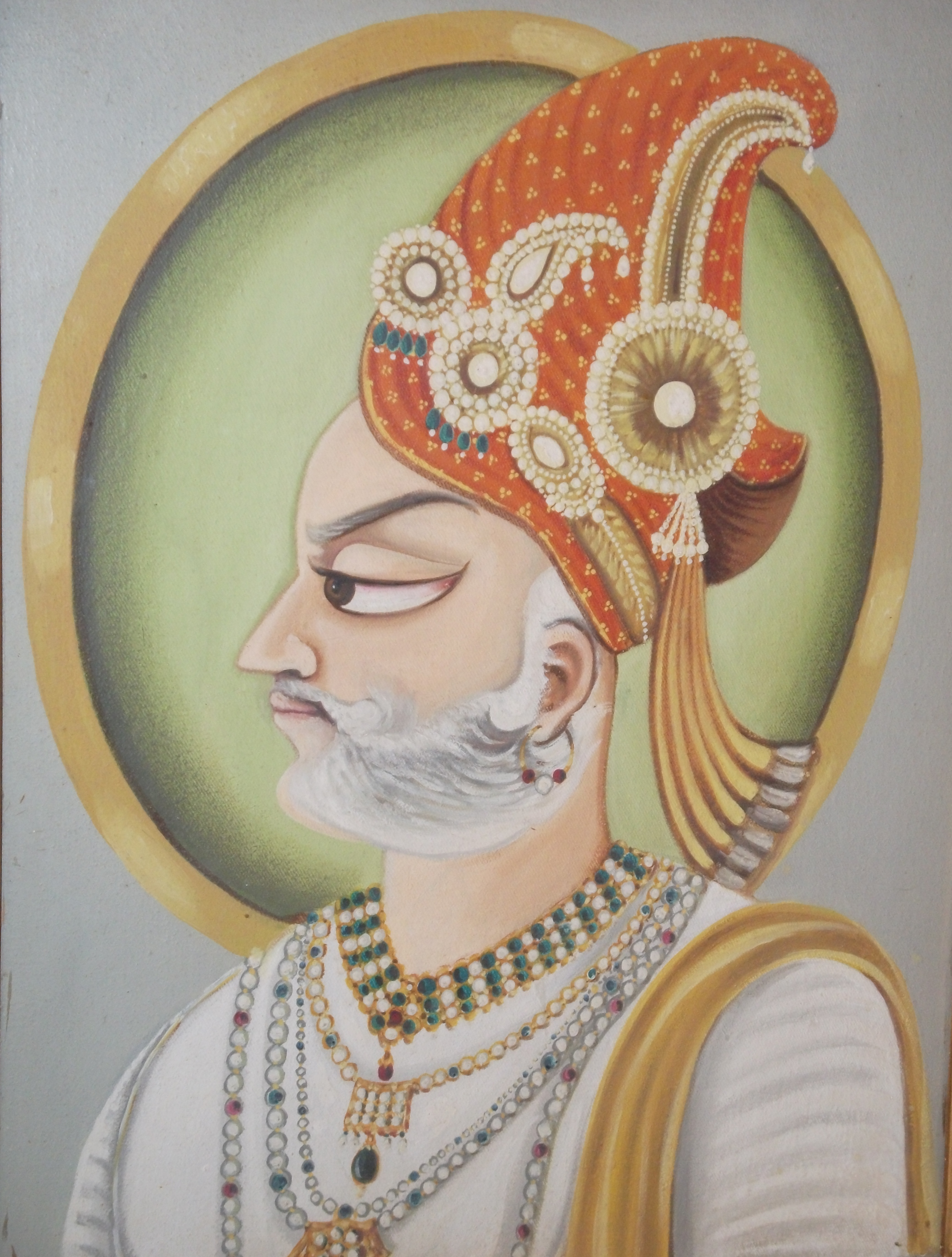
Rawal Jaisal, founder of Jaisalmer Fort.

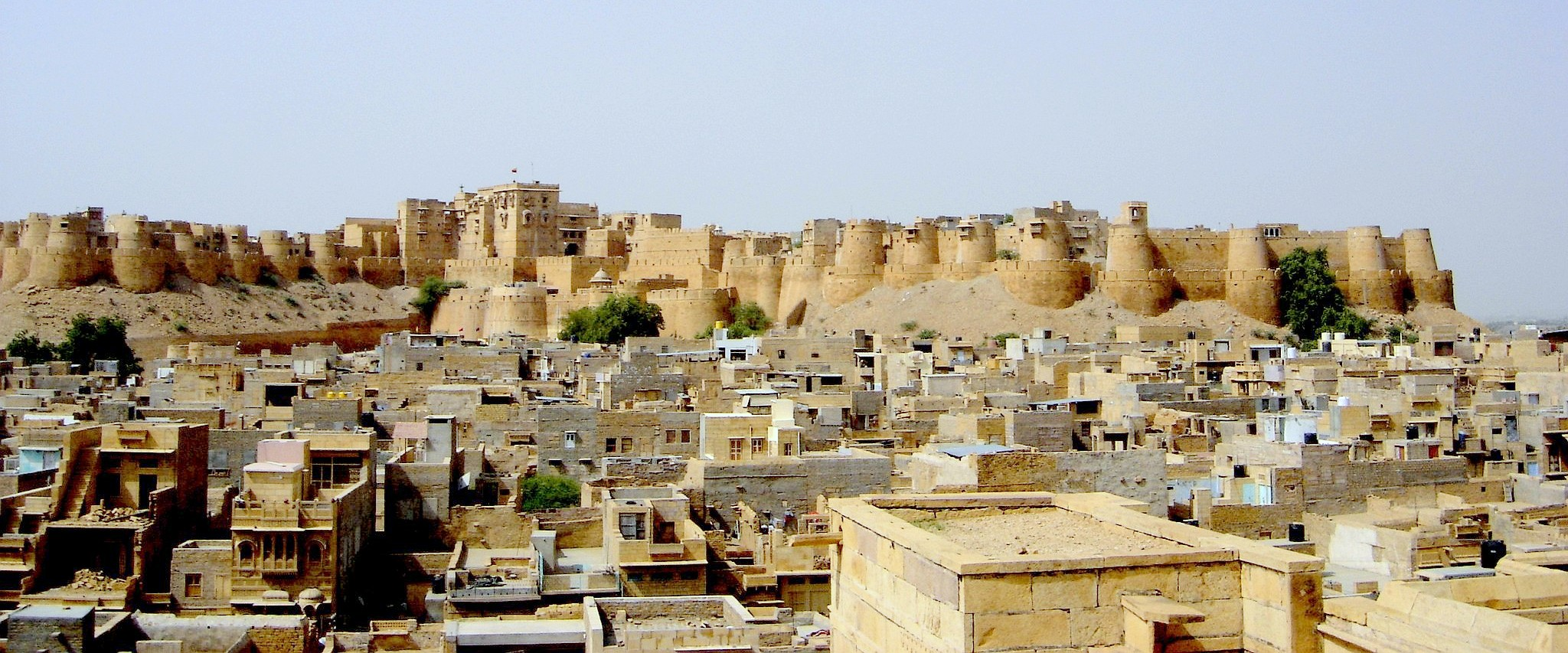
Jaisalmer Fort, built in 1156 AD by the Rajput Rawal (ruler) Jaisal.

Around 1299 CE, Rawal Jait Singh I faced a long siege by Alauddin Khalji of Delhi Sultanate, who is said to have been provoked by a Bhati raid on his treasure caravan. By the end of the siege, facing certain defeat, the Bhati Rajput women committed 'Jauhar', and the male warriors under the command of Mularaja met their fatal end in battle with the Sultan's forces. For a few years after the successful siege, the fort remained under the sway of Delhi Sultanate, before being eventually reoccupied by some surviving Bhatis.

In 1541 CE, Rawal Lunakaran also fought Mughal emperor Humayun when the latter attacked the fort on his way to Ajmer. He also offered his daughter in marriage to emperor Akbar. Mughals controlled the fort until 1762.

The treaty between the East India Company and Mulraj on 12 December 1818 allowed the Mulraj to retain control of the fort and provided for protection from invasion. After the death of Mulraj in 1820, his grandson Gaj Singh inherited control of the fort.

=== Modern history (Princely state of Jaisalmer) ===
On 11 December 1818 Jaisalmer became a British protectorate in the Rajputana Agency.

Map of Jaisalmer State with the duchies of Satto, Pithala, Loharki, Lakhmana, Didhu, Kanod, Tota, Bhadariya, and Nachna

Traditionally, in the Middle Ages, the main source of income for the kingdom was levies on caravans, but the economy was heavily affected when Bombay emerged as a major port and sea trade replaced the traditional land routes. Maharawal Ranjit Singh and Bairi Sal Singh attempted to turn around the economic decline but the dramatic reduction in trade impoverished the kingdom. A severe drought and the resulting famine from 1895 to 1900, during the reign of Maharawal Salivahan Singh, only made matters worse by causing widespread loss of the livestock that the increasingly agriculturally based kingdom relied upon.

The attempts of Maharawal Jawahir Singh (1914–1949) at modernization were also not entirely successful in turning the kingdom's economy around, and the drylands of Jaisalmer remained backward compared with other regions of Rajputana, especially the neighbouring state of Jodhpur. Nonetheless, the extensive water storage and supply, sanitation, and health infrastructures developed in the 1930s by the prime minister Dewan Bahadur Brijmohan Nath Zutshi provided significant relief during the severe droughts of 1941 and 1951. Maharawal During 1930–1947, Jawahir Singh and his ministers also promoted technical education and the academic disciplines of civil and mechanical engineering in the state.

After the departure of the British from India in 1947, the Maharawal signed an Instrument of Accession to the new Union of India, while retaining some internal autonomy until the 1950s.

== List of rulers ==
=== Rawals ===
- Rawal Jaisal Singh (1153–1168), official founder of the kingdom
- Rawal Shalivahan Singh II (1168–1200)
- Rawal Bijal Singh (1200–1200)
- Rawal Kailan Singh (1200–1219)
- Rawal Chachak Dev Singh (1219–1241)
- Rawal Karan Singh I (1241–1271)
- Rawal Lakhan Sen (1271–1275)
- Rawal Punpal Singh (1275–1276)
- Rawal Jait Singh I (1276–1294)
- Rawal Mulraj Singh I (1294–1295)
- Rawal Durjan Sal (Duda) (1295–1306)
- Rawal Gharsi Singh (1306–1335)
- Rawal Kehar Singh II (1335–1402)
- Rawal Lachman Singh (1402–1436)
- Rawal Bersi Singh (1436–1448)
- Rawal Chachak Dev Singh II (1448–1457)
- Rawal Devidas Singh (1457–1497)
- Rawal Jait Singh II (1497–1530)
- Rawal Karan Singh II (1530–1530)
- Rawal Lunkaran Singh (1530–1551)
- Rawal Maldev Singh (1551–1562)
- Rawal Harraj Singh (1562–1578)
- Rawal Bhim Singh (1578–1624)
- Rawal Kalyan Das (1624–1634)
- Rawal Manohar Das (1634–1648)
- Rawal Ramchandra Dev (1648–1651)
- Rawal Sabal Singh (1651–1661)

=== Maharawals ===
- Maharawal Amar Singh of Jaisalmer (1661–1702)
- Maharawal Jaswant Singh of Jaisalmer (1702–1708)
- Maharawal Budh Singh (1708–1722)
- Maharawal Akhai Singh (1722–1762)
- Maharawal Mulraj Singh II (1762–1820)
- Maharawal Gaj Singh (1820–1846)
- Maharawal Ranjit Singh (1846–1864)
- HH Maharawal Sir Bairi Sal (1864–1891)
- HH Maharawal Sir Shalivahan Singh III (1891 –1914)
- HH Maharawal Sir Jawahir Singh (1914–1949), last ruler of the state.
- HH Maharawal Girdhar Singh (1949–1950), he was instrumental in merging his former state with Rajasthan Union in the year 1949 forming Greater Rajasthan in 1950.

=== Titular rulers ===
- Maharawal Raghunath Singh (1950–1982) Government of India abolished his right to the Privy Purse, hereditary titles and other privileges in 1971.
- Maharawal Brijraj Singh (1982–2020)
- Maharawal Chaitanya Raj Singh (since 2020)

=== Dewans ===
- List of Dewans (chief ministers)
1. Mohata Nathmal (1885–1890)
2. Thakur kado singh (1890-1895)
3. Mehta Jagjiwan (1895–1903)
4. Thakur Kushal Singh (acting) (1890?–1900)
5. Rawatmal Purohit Khetrapalia (acting) (1900–1909)
6. Lakshmi Das Sapat (1909–1911)
7. Mohammed Niyaz Ali Kazi (1911–1912)
8. Murarji Rooji (1912–1930)
9. M.L. Khosala
10. Pandit Jamana Lal
11. Munshi Nand Kishore
12. Lala Rakhpat Raj
13. P.K. Shurugula
14. Brij Mohan Nath Zutshi
15. Anand Swaroop
16. Onkar Singh
17. Lakhpat Rai Sikund (1940–1942)

== In popular culture ==
- Jaisalmer ka Gundaraj (lit. Atrocious rule of Jaisalmer [king]), by the Sagarmal Gopa (1900–46) - a freedom fighter and patriot from Jaisalmer district.

== See also ==
- List of princely states of British India (by region)
- List of princely states of British India (alphabetical)

== Sources ==
- Bond, J. W.; Wright, Arnold (2006). Indian States: A Biographical, Historical, and Administrative Survey. New Delhi: Asian Educational Services. ISBN 978-81-206-1965-4. Archived from the original on 20 June 2024.
- Kothiyal, Tanuja (2016). Nomadic Narratives: A History of Mobility and Identity in the Great Indian. Cambridge University Press. ISBN 9781107080317.
- Lethbridge, Sir Roper (1900). The Golden Book of India. A Genealogical and Biographical Dictionary of the Ruling Princes, Chiefs, Nobles, and Other Personages, Titled Or Decorated, of the Indian Empire. With an Appendix for Ceylon. London: S. Low, Marston & Company.
