= Rawal (title) =

Ruler of certain Indian princely states

Rawal (also spelled Raval) or Raol is a regional variation of the title Raja/Radjah (literally 'king') that was used by the Hindu Rajput rulers of some princely states of Rajputana and Western-India (notably Gujarat) and is at present too used as a caste designation or surname by the Guhila Rajputs and also adopted by few other communities.

The term "Rawal" derives from the Sanskrit title "Rājakula". The related term Maharawal, which derives from the Sanskrit title "Mahārājakula", means "Great Rawal".

== Notable people with Rawal (title) ==
- Rawal Jaisal, founder of the Kingdom of Jaisalmer.
- Bappa Rawal, founder of the kingdom of Mewar.
- The Nambudiri priests of the Badrinath and Kedarnath were given the title of "Rawal" by the king of Garhwal in 1776
- Raval (also known as Rawal or Raval Yogi), an Indian caste categorized among the Other Backward Classes
- Rawal, a gotra of Rajputs found in India, Pakistan and Pakistani and Indian diaspora; its members claim to be the original rulers of Rawalpindi

== See also ==
- Rawal (caste)
- Bappa Rawal
- Rawal Jaisal Singh
- Rawal Ratan Singh
