= Battle of Bhutala =

Battle in Rajasthan, India between 1222 and 1229

Date	1222 / 1229
Location	Bhutala, Rajasthan
Result	Rajput victory

Belligerents
Rajput Confederacy: Guhila dynasty; Vaghela dynasty; Paramaras; Chahamanas	Delhi sultanate

Commanders and leaders
Jaitrasimha; Viradhavala; Dharavarsa; Udayasimha	Iltutmish

The Battle of Bhutala took place in modern-day Rajasthan between Maharawal Jaitrasimha of Mewar and Sultan Iltutmish of the Delhi sultanate somewhere between 1222 and 1229 A.D. Initially, Mewar suffered from invasion and the capital was destroyed, but Jaitrasimha, supported by Viradhavala of Dholaka and his allies Udayasimha, the Chahamana ruler of Jalor, Dharavarsa, the Paramara ruler of Abu, and others, forced the retreat of the sultan without achieving his end.

== Background ==
After the defeat of Chahamanas of Shakhambhari in 1192, several attempts were made to annex portions of Rajasthan. During the short and unstable reign of Aram Shah, the Rajput clans of Rajasthan appeared to reclaim much of their former prominence. However, Iltutmish, the new and dynamic Sultan of Delhi, was not content with merely maintaining the territories in Rajasthan that he had inherited. Instead, he launched significant efforts to expand his control into the western regions of the region. After solidifying his authority in Delhi, Iltutmish directed his focus towards Rajasthan, initiating campaigns to assert his dominance over the area.

== Battle ==
=== Hostilities ===
King Viradhaval of Gujarat engaged in hostilities with Jaitrasingh, the ruler of Mewar, who remained defiant, bolstered by his confidence in his military strength. According to historical accounts, during this time, a spy informed King Viradhaval about events in Nagada, where the city had been set ablaze, causing widespread panic. Many residents fled in fear, while others took their own lives. The spy reported that he sought to calm the distressed population by announcing the arrival of Viradhaval with his full army, which allegedly caused the Turk invaders to retreat in disarray. A fierce battle took place at Bhutala, near Nagada, during which Talaraksha Yograj’s eldest son, Pemraj, was killed.

=== Inscriptions ===
The latter part of the narrative appears to be somewhat exaggerated as it glorifies the author’s generous patron, Viradhaval. Details of this invasion are also recorded in the Chirawa inscription dated 1278 CE. According to the inscription, a Sultan attacked Nagada, resulting in heavy destruction. Additionally, the Ghaghasa inscription of 1265 CE and the Chirawa inscription of 1273 CE reveal that the Sultan failed to subdue the pride of Jaitrasingh. These records suggest that despite initial setbacks, Jaitrasingha rallied his forces, decisively defeated the Sultan's army, and compelled the invaders to retreat.

=== Texts ===
The invader is referred to in the text as Milachchhrikara. According to G.H. Ojha, this term is a Sanskritized version of Amir-i-Shikar, a title attributed to Iltutmish in the Tabaqat-i-Nasiri. However, O.R. Barnett and H.C. Ray dispute this identification, arguing that Milachchhrikara cannot phonetically derive from Amir-i-Shikar. Dasharatha Sharma, on the other hand, interprets it as a Paishachi form.

=== Dates ===
Regarding the date of this invasion, G.H. Ojha places the event around 1229 CE, while Dasharatha Sharma suggests 1222 CE. Sharma bases his conclusion on the fact that Vastupala, the chief organizer of the anti-Muslim confederacy, was the governor of Cambay (now Khambat) during the invasion. Since Vastupal held this position between 1219 and 1222 and was removed in 1222, Sharma argues that the incursion could not have occurred after that year. However, the Charbhuja temple inscription of Nandesama, dated 1222 CE, mentions Jaitrasingh as having his capital at Nagada.

Given that Jaitrasingh relocated his capital to Ahar after the invasion, the event is unlikely to have occurred in 1222. A more detailed account of the invasion is found in the Hamir-Mada-Mardan, a contemporary work completed in 1229 CE. Therefore, the invasion is most likely to have occurred between 1222 and 1229 CE.

== Aftermath ==
After the destruction of Nagada, Jaitrasimha abandoned the city, and the capital of Mewar was moved to Chittor. Iltutmish was decisively defeated by the Guhilot prince, which prevented him from attempting to invade the region again during his reign. Jaitrasingh successfully captured the territory of Vagada and granted it to his son, Sihad. While G.H. Ojha and Dashrath Sharma have suggested that Sihad was the grandson of Samantsingh of Mewar, this claim is not supported by earlier epigraphic sources. The Uparganva inscription of 1404 CE confirms that Jaitrasingh conquered Vagada and assigned it to Sihad. Other inscriptions also reference Jaitrasingh as the father of Sihad, identifying him as none other than Jaitrasingh of Mewar. After this, Mewar became a challenging region for many Turkish sultans of Delhi due to its difficult terrain and strong fortresses.

== See also ==
- Second Battle of Tarain
- Iltutmish
