= Guhila (clan) =

Clan of Rajputs

Guhila is a clan of Rajputs and claims to be descendant from the Suryavanshi lineage . They ruled a number of kingdoms and principalities including Mitaron, Mewar, Banswara, Dungarpur, Pratapgarh, Shahpura, Bhavnagar, Palitana, Lathi and Vala.

== History ==
The Guhilas of Medapata belonged to this clan. The Atpur Inscription of 977 AD lists 20 kings starting with Guhadatta and ending with Saktikumara. Major cities included Nagahrada and Aghata. Chittor was captured by Bappa Rawal in the 8th century. The Guhilas fought the Paramaras in the 11th century and the Chaulukyas in the 12th century. During the reign of Jaitrasimha (1213–1252 AD), Nagahrada was sacked by Iltutmish. Then Samarasimha (1273–1301 AD) submitted to Ulugh Khan before Ratnasimha was defeated by Alauddin Khalji in 1303 when Chittor Fort was captured.

According to 1274 CE Chittor inscription and 1285 CE Achaleshwar (Abu) inscription of Vedasharma, Bappa Rawal "changed his priestly splendour for regal lustre". Based on this, scholars such as D. R. Bhandarkar theorized that the Guhilas were originally Brahmins. G. H. Ojha, however, believed that the statement in Vedasharma's inscription is a misinterpretation of the earlier Atpur inscription. The Atpur inscription describes Guhadatta as a "Mahideva", which according to historian R. V. Somani, can be translated as either "king" or "Brahmin"

In present-day Rajasthan, the Gahlot Rajputs ruled the princely states of Banswara, Dungarpur, Mewar, Pratapgarh and Shahpura.

In Gujarat, they are generally referred to as Gohil and ruled the princely states of Bhavnagar, Palitana, Lathi and Vala and Rajpipla.

== See also ==
- Rajput clans
