= Kingdom of Mewar =

Former kingdom in the Indian subcontinent (566–1949)

Coordinates: 24.58°N 73.68°E

- 566–1303; 1326-1948
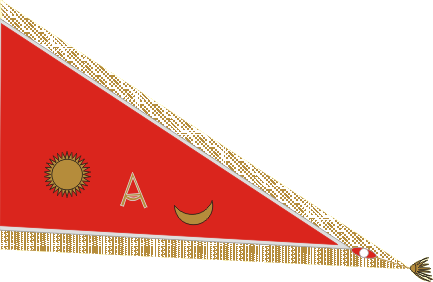
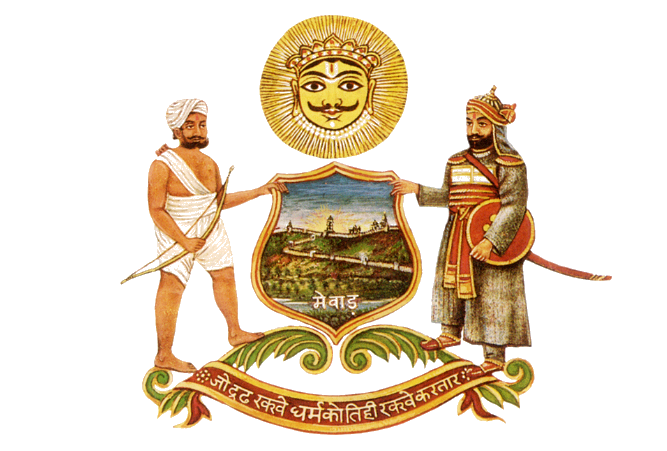
- Flag Coat of arms
- Motto: Jo drirha rakhe dharma koun tihin rakhe kartar; "The Almighty protects the one who upholds righteousness"
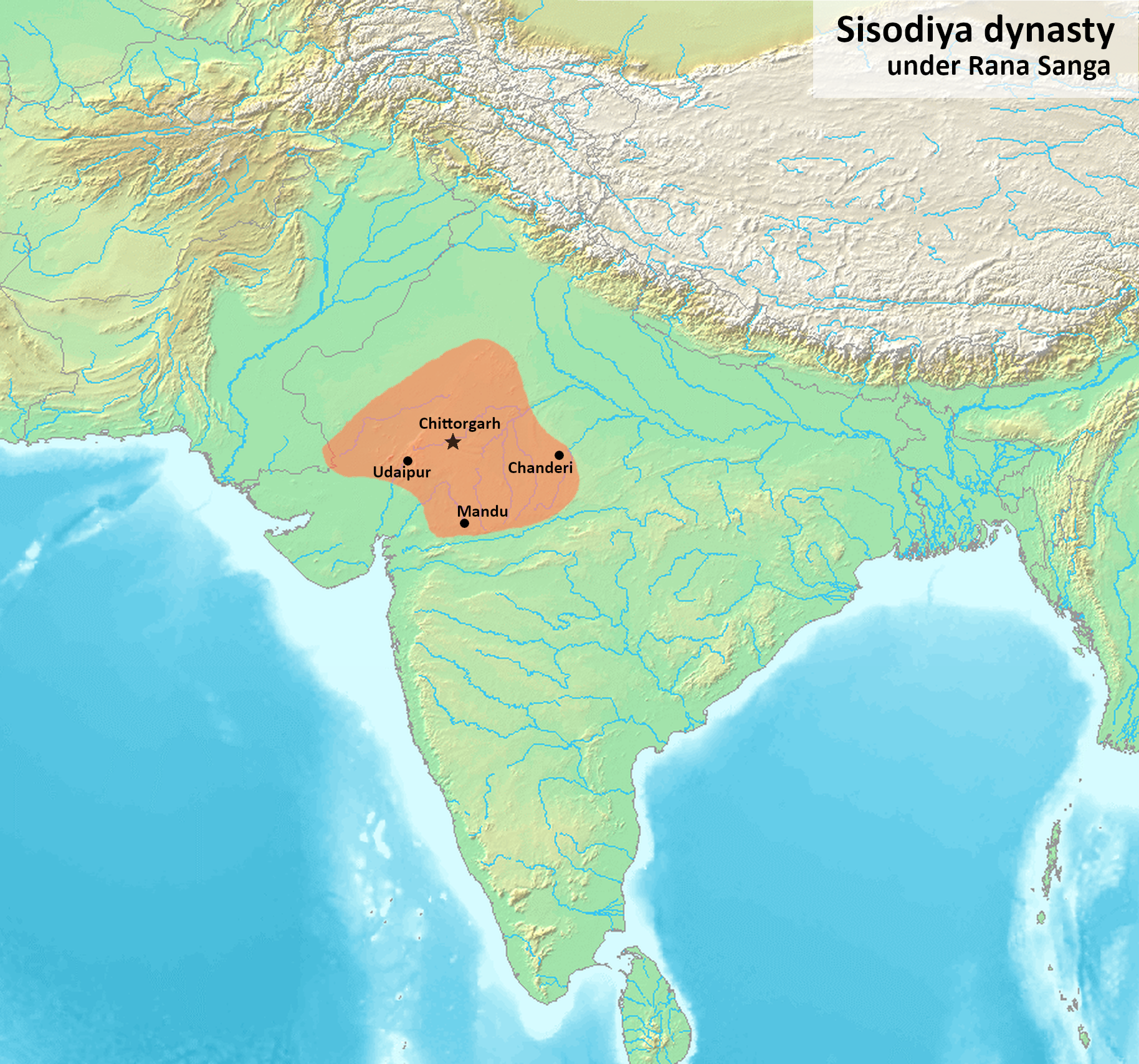
- The Kingdom of Mewar at its greatest extent under the Sisodiya dynasty during the reign of Rana Sanga.
- Capital: Nagda (c. 734–948); Ahar (948–1213); Chittor (1213–1567); Udaipur (1568–1585) (1620–1948); Chawand (1585–1620)
- Common languages: Mewari
- Religion: Hinduism
- Government: Absolute monarchy (c. 566–1947); Constitutional monarchy (1947–1949)
- Rana/Maharana/Rawal
  - 566-586: Guhila (first)
  - 728-764: Bappa Rawal
  - 1326-1364: Hammir Singh
  - 1433-1468: Kumbhakaran Singh
  - 1508-1528: Sangram Singh I
  - 1572-1597: Pratap Singh I
  - 1652-1680: Raj Singh I
  - 1930-1948: Bhupal Singh (last)
- History
  - Established: 566
  - Accession to the Union of India: 18 April 1948

Area
- 1901: 33,030 km^{2} (12,750 sq mi)
- 1941: 33,517 km^{2} (12,941 sq mi)

Population
  - 1941: 1,926,698
Preceded by
Mori Kingdom
Succeeded by
Rajputana Agency
Dominion of India
Delhi Sultanate
Mughal Empire
Maratha Empire
- Today part of: India; Pakistan

The Kingdom of Mewar, later known as Udaipur State, was an independent Hindu kingdom that existed in the Mewar region of Rajputana in the Indian subcontinent and later became a dominant state in medieval India. The kingdom was initially founded and ruled by the Guhila dynasty, followed by its cadet branch, the Sisodia Dynasty.

The earliest kingdom was centered around the south-central part of Rajasthan, state of India. It was bordered by the Aravali Range to the northwest, Ajmer to the north, Gujarat, Vagad and Malwa regions to the south and the Hadoti region to the east.

Mewar rose to prominence in the reign of Bappa Rawal (7th century) known for his involvement in thwarting Arab incursions in India. Over time, it became vassal to Imperial Pratihara, Paramaras and then to Chahamanas. In the early 10th century, Mewar emerged as an independent state, actively battling neighboring powers and confronting the expansion of Delhi Sultanate until the fall of its capital Chittorgarh in 1303 against the latter, leading to the annihilation of Guhila Dynasty.

The Sisodia dynasty, a junior branch of Guhilas, re-occupied Mewar in 1326, ushering in a golden age characterized by military prowess and territorial expansion. Under the reigns of Maharana Kumbha and his grandson Maharana Sanga, Mewar achieved victories against Islamic States of Malwa, Gujarat, and Delhi particularly in Mewar-Malwa conflicts and Mewar- Delhi conflicts. It also successfully fought off and vassalized neighboring Hindu kingdoms. At its zenith under Rana Sanga, it controlled large parts of Northern India. After Rana Sanga's death, the kingdom declined rapidly. Nonetheless, it continued to resist Mughal expansion, most notably under Maharana Pratap, later it became a tributary state with a significant degree of autonomy. The decline of Mughal Empire saw sovereign leaders like Raj Singh and his successors led rebellions culminating in de facto independence for Mewar, notably Rathore Rebellion and Rajput-Mughal war (1708–1710). Eventually, falling under Maratha Empire's influence and accepting British suzerainty in 1818, Mewar remained a princely state until it joined the Union of India in 1947.

Mewar's legacy includes its prolonged resistance against Islamic invasion and traditions like Jauhar (self-immolation) witnessed during the time of defeats. While primarily a Hindu state, the kingdom also patronized Jainism and Buddhism. Among Mewar's UNESCO World Heritage Sites are Kumbhalgarh and Chittorgarh, described variously as the jewels of Rajput architect in India. Udaipur, also known as the city of lakes and one of the largest cities of the North India was also founded by the Rana of Mewar, Udai Singh II.

== Geography ==
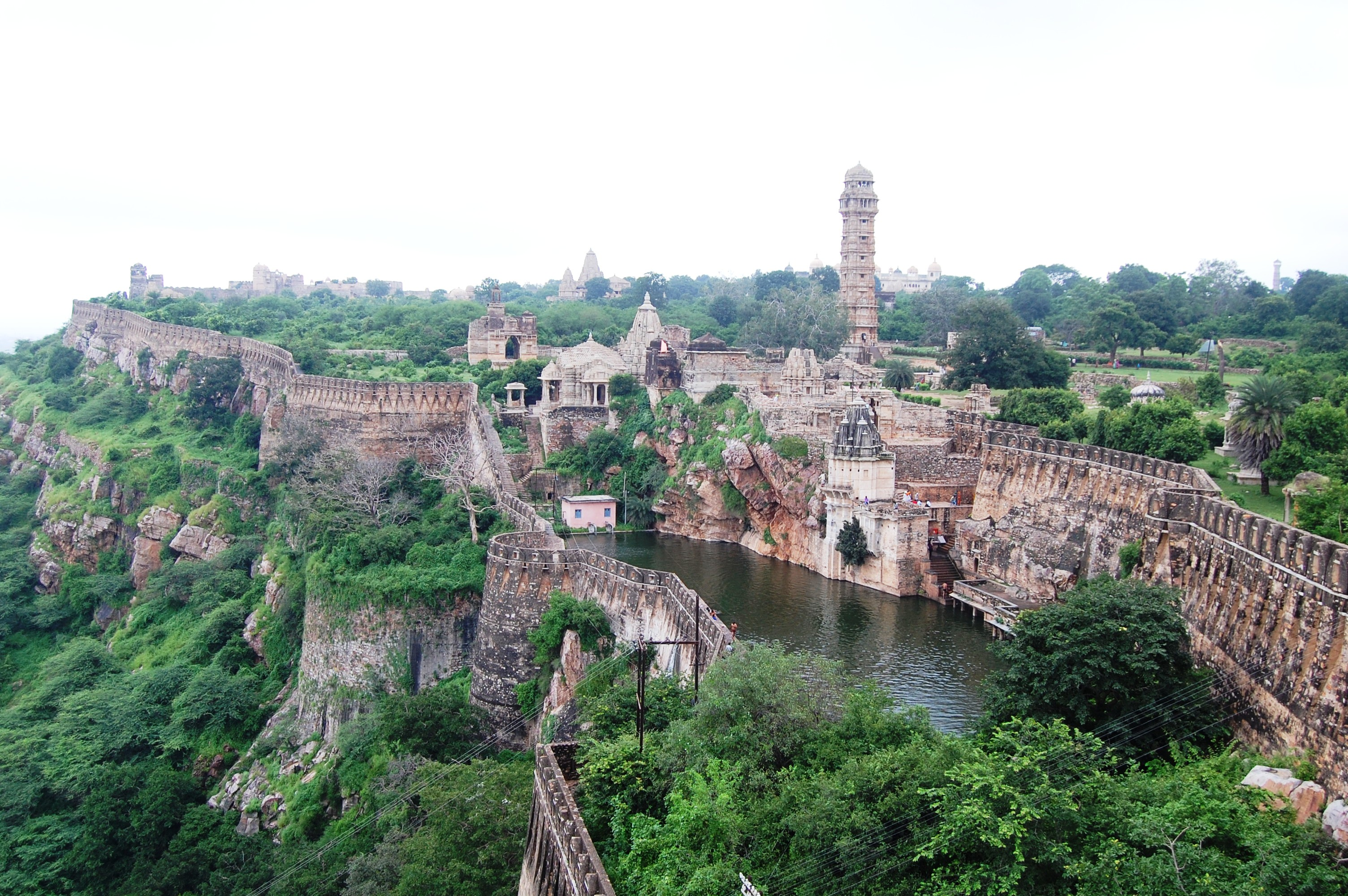
Chittorgarh Fort

Mewar is surrounded by the Aravali Range to the northwest, Ajmer to the north, and Gujarat, Vagad, and Malwa to the south, with the Hadoti region to the east. The area features mountainous hills, plateaus, and rivers such as Banas, Som, and Sabarmati, along with dry deciduous forests that are denser during the monsoon months. The central plains, watered by the Banas River and its tributaries, are highly cultivated, with black, light loamy soil supporting crops like cotton, maize, sugarcane, wheat, and barley, suitable for both Kharif and Rabi seasons. The average height of these plains is about 600 ft. MSL. This geography has allowed Mewar to maintain its freedom and resist imperial powers, making it favourable for guerrilla warfare. The boundaries of Mewar largely remained consistent except from 1326 to 1533, during which time the kingdom more or less extended from near Mandu(capital of Malwa Sultanate) in the south to Bayana in the north-east, reaching into desert areas towards the Indus River in the west. Thus, controlling large parts of Northern India. However, due to dynastic conflicts and ongoing struggles against the Mughals and Marathas, the kingdom's size diminished, eventually covering an area of 14,000 square kilometers by 1941. With the treaty of Accession to India, the area of Mewar was merged with the Rajasthan.

== History ==
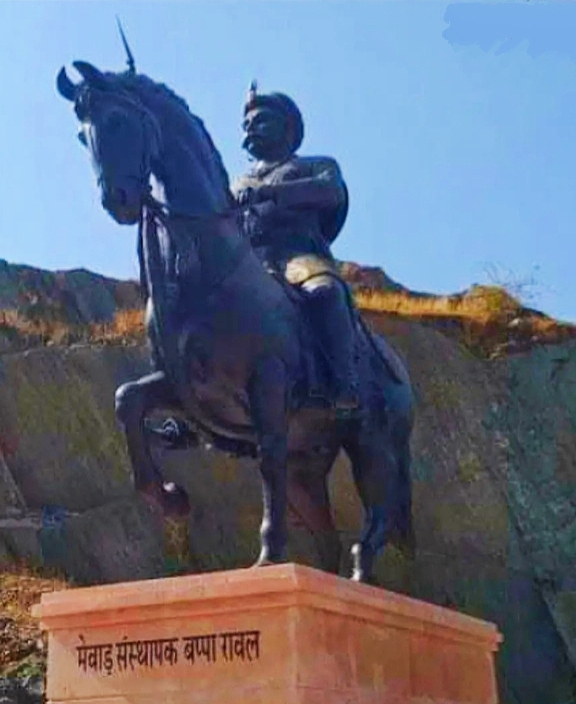
Statue of Bappa Rawal at Mewar (r.728 CE–763 CE).

=== Early History of Mewar ===
Less is known about the origins of the Kingdom of Mewar. It was originally ruled by the Guhila dynasty. Guhadatta is considered the first ruler of the kingdom in the 7th century. In the early 8th century, it came under the sub ordinance of the regional Mori rulers. The kingdom under Bappa Rawal acquired control of Chittor in 728 after taking it away from its Mori overlords. Nagda was the capital of Mewar around this period. Bappa Rawal defeated an early Arab Caliphate invasion of India through a confederation with Gurjar-Pratihara ruler Nagabhata I. Bappa Rawals successors, namely Khuman II would continue to resist Arab incursions into the country.

Sahasra Bahu Temples in Nagda, Rajasthan, 10th century CE.

The Guhilas from the 8th century acknowledged the suzerainty of the Gurjara-Pratiharas. In the 10th century, Bharttripatta II became an independent ruler and broke ties with the Pratihara empire and assumed the title Maharajadhiraja. His successor Allata killed Devapala, the ruler of the Gurjara Pratihara at that time.

The Guhilas was controlled by the Kingdom of Malwa in the 11th century and by the Chahamanas in the 12th century. Guhila ruler Samantsingh established another branch of Guhilas in Vagad and also fought alongside the defeated Prithviraja III of Ajmer in Second Battle of Tarain against Muizzuddin Muhammad Ghuri.

Through the 13th century, the Guhilas started getting more powerful and became independent of the Chahamana rule. It had to resist multiple invasions by Turkic invaders. Eventually, in 1303 Sultan of Delhi, Alauddin Khalji invaded Mewar, besieged Chittor. In the siege, Rana Lakhan with his seven sons died in the battle and the women committed Jauhar. Although, Ajay Singh survived the disaster who later brought up Hammir.

=== Imperial Mewar ===
==== Early Expansion and consolidation ====
Following Alauddin Khalji's invasion in 1303, the Guhila Dynasty ceased to exist. In 1326, Hammir Singh (1326-1364), a descendant of Rahapa, from Sisodia dynasty (Cadet branch of Guhilas) attempted to regain control of Mewar, but his initial efforts were thwarted. Khizr Khan, one of Alauddin's sons, was forced to relocate, and Maldev Songara from the Chauhan clan took charge of Mewar, successfully repelling Hammir's assaults. Eventually, Hammir seized the fort of Jilwara and established a base in Kelwara, allowing him to capture further territories, including Sirohi and Idar.

Hammir later recaptured Chittorgarh and defeated the Delhi Sultanate forces at the Battle of Singoli.

Rana Kshetra Singh (1364–1382), expanded the kingdom significantly, capturing Ajmer, Hadoti and Mandalgarh. He also quelled a rebellion in Idar alongside defeating Dilawar Khan of the Malwa Sultanate. Kshetra was succeeded by Lakha, who conquered Merwara and helped Rao Ranmal Rathore, one of the princesses of the neighbouring Kingdom of Marwar, to gain the throne, thus establishing Mewar's influence over Marwar. He also rebuilt Mewar's infrastructure, destroyed during the invasion of Allaudin Khalji, but died in battle to secure pilgrimage taxes. It was during his reign that his elder son Chunda abdicated the throne for his younger brother Mokal, son of the second wife of Lakha and a Rathore princess, over a dispute.

Lakha's son Mokal Singh became Rana at a young age under the regency of his mother, Hansa Bai. He successfully defended against invasions, annexed Ajmer and Sambhar, and conquered Jalore before being assassinated by his uncles.

==== Maharana Kumbha ====
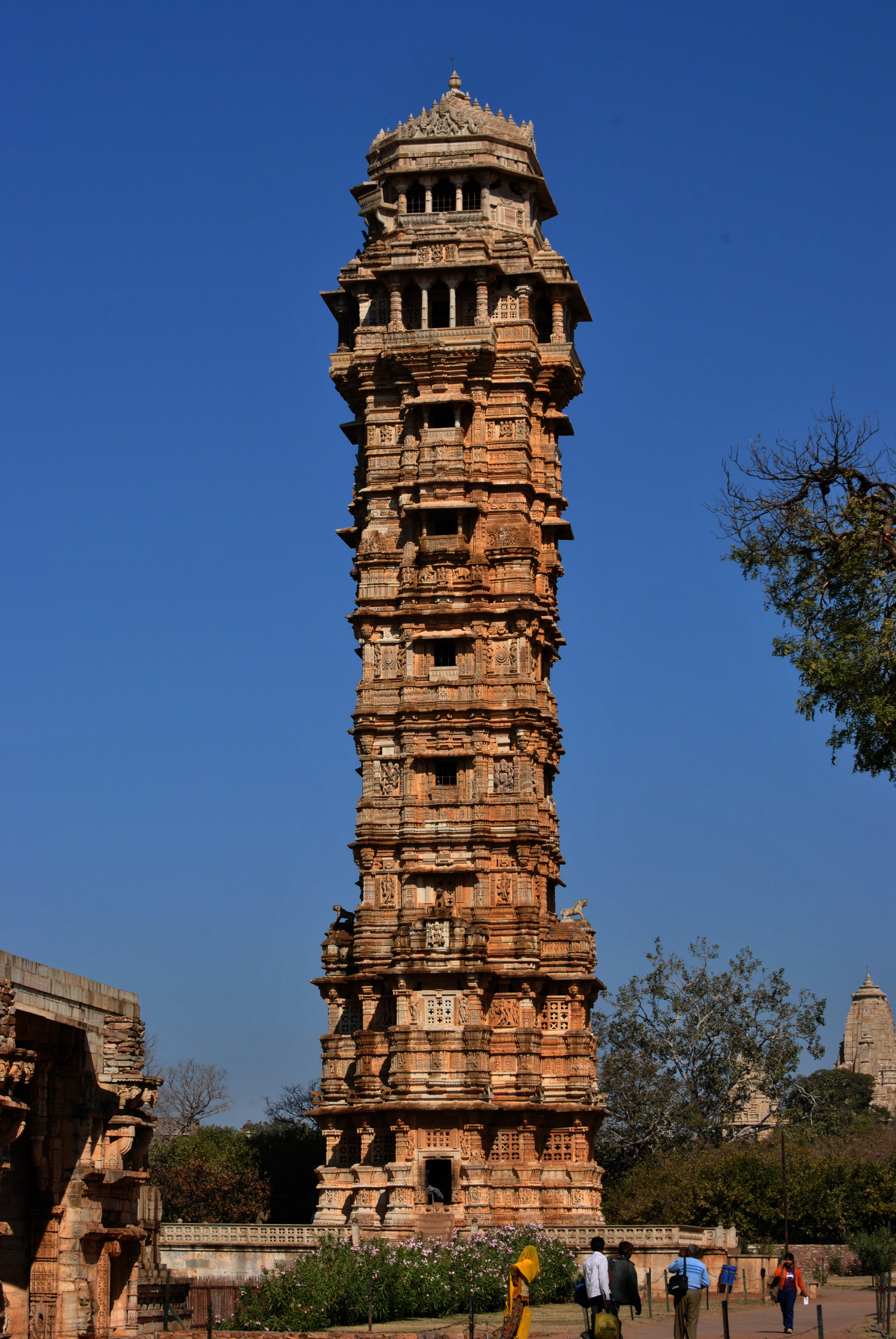
Vijay Stambha is a victory monument built by Rana Kumbha in 1448 and located within Chittor Fort

After his father's assassination, Kumbha succeeded to the throne of Mewar in turbulent times, when it was under constant threat from all sides, especially from the Sultanates of Malwa and Gujarat. Malwa was able to drive the traditional vassals of Mewar, like the Hadas of Hadoti and Gujarat, and the rulers of Sirohi, into their side and was even hatching designs on Mewar. At this time, Kumbha was helped by his uncle Rao Ranmal Rathore of Marwar, who was a political junior ally of Mewar, as the latter was helped by Kumbha's father. In securing the throne of Marwar. Ranmal first killed the assassins of Mokal and restored stability in Mewar.

Kumbha, on the other hand, also wasted no time in turning towards the vassals who had defected from the side of Mewar. He first defeated the Hadas and annexed Mandalgarh, bringing Mewari control over Hadoti again, and then turned his attention towards Sirohi, where he annexed Abu and also reduced the rulers of Sirohi to vassals alongside Dungarpur, which was in rebellion. Then, Kumbha started a rigorous policy of expansion in which he annexed Sambhar, Ajmer, Khatu, Chatsu, Lalsot, Marot, Toda, Didwana, Narena, Gagraun, Mandsaur, and Ranthambore. He also placed a bid for supremacy in Malwa after Sultan Hoshang Shah's death, and one of his ministers usurped it, due to which Umar Khan, one of Hoshang Shah's sons, came to Mewar for help. Kumbha invaded Malwa and defeated Mahmud and captured him. He reduced to vassals the Sultanate of Nagaur, the Kachwahas of Amber, the Sankhlas of Janglau, and the Khyamkhanis of Jhunjhunu. A dispute occurred between Ranamal and Kumbha. Kumbha had Ranamal assassinated and Marwar captured for seven years, which he later allowed Jodha (son of Ranamal) to recapture on the pretext of following his grandmother's wishes, but some historians argue that Kumbha didn't want to fight a three-front war in Malwa, Gujarat, and Mewar, and also to look generous among his Rajput folk. When Idar, one of the Vassals of Mewar, was captured by the Sultan of Gujarat, Kumbha extended necessary help in recapturing it. In this way, Kumbha was able to extend his sway over much of Rajasthan and areas of Northern Madhya Pradesh and Gujarat. However, this policy of expansion came at a cost when the Sultans of Malwa and Gujarat, in order to avenge their initial defeats, started to attack Mewar. The odds against Mewar were overwhelming, as Nagaur also rose in rebellion. Though, sorely pressed from all sides by the invasions of the Sultans of Malwa and Gujarat, who attacked numerous strongholds such as Ajmer. Kumbha was largely able to maintain his position and retain most of his conquests except for some outlying areas such as Ranthambore.

Kumbha was also a patron of the arts and a great builder. He is said to have erected the famous Vijay Stambha of Chittor and was responsible for the construction of numerous Hindu and Jain shrines. His commentary on the Gita and Govinda is also very popular and widely praised. He is credited to have build 32 out of the 84 fortreses of Mewar. He is one of the most popular rulers of medieval India.

=== Maharana Raimal ===
He came to power by defeating, Udai Singh I in battles at Jawar, Darimpur and Pangarh. He restore Mewar to stability from the damage that has occurred following the assassination of Maharana Kumbha. Early in Raimal's reign, Ghiyas Shah of Malwa attacked Chittor unsuccessfully. Soon after, Ghiyas Shah's general, Zafar Khan attacked Mewar and was defeated at Mandalgarh and Khairabad. By marrying Sringardevi (daughter of Rao Jodha), Raimal ended the conflict with the Rathores. During Raimal's reign, Godwar, Toda and Ajmer were captured by his son Prithviraj.He also helped Hadas to recapture Hadoti from the grasp of Malwa Sultanate and left a fairly large kingdom to his sons Raimal also strengthened the state of Mewar and repaired the temple of Eklingji in Chittor.

=== Maharana Sanga ===
After his father's death, Sangram Singh ascended on the throne in 1509. The time at which he ascended the throne of Mewar was an opportunistic one as the Sultanates of Malwa and Gujarat and fallen in disarray and rulers of Marwar, Amber, Hadoti, Idar and the other Rajputs states were not powerful enough to contend with the rulers of Mewar. He first strengthened his kingdom by repairing the existing forts and garrisoned them and reorganised the army and proper defences were laid along with reorganising of administration by appointing his one of close associates to governor of Ajmer. He also reduced neighbouring states of Amber, Sirohi and Idar to vassalship again.

Around 1517, in the Sultanate of Malwa under the Sultan Mahmud Khilji II, too much power landed in the hands of Medini Rai which upset a lot of Muslim nobles. Eventually, Mahmud himself asked for help from the Sultan of Gujarat to get rid of Medini Rai. The war started as the two sultans besieged Mandu where Rai's son died. Sanga supported Medini Rai and in turn attacked and captured Gagron where he appointed Medini Rai to govern as a replacement to his prior holdings in Malwa. In 1518 Mahmud Khilji II collected another massive army and invaded Mewar through Gagron. In the ensuing battle, the Maharana won decisively; he took Khilji captive, appointed a physician to care for Khilji, and later escorted him back to his kingdom to Mandu. Eastern Malwa including Chanderi was captured and were given to Medini Ray. In 1518, Ibrahim Lodhi ascended to the throne of Delhi. He engaged with Sanga in two major battles when he realized Sanga had been encroaching on land in the Sultanate. The sultan was defeated at Khatoli and Dholpur; as a result, Sanga was able to capture the entire North-East Rajputana up to Agra. This defeat was a humiliating setback for the new sultan as he lost much territory to an internal conflict in his empire. In the Battle of Khatoli, a sword injured Sanga's arm, and his leg was injured by an arrow, making him lame.

In 1520, Sangram decided to attack Idar and the Sultanate of Gujarat after a furious exchange with him. In the ensuing campaign, the Rana not only completely captured Idar, but also raided Ahmadabad and returned with massive wealth looted. After looting Ahmedabad, the Sultan of Malwa and Gujarat mobilized heavily in 1521 against the Rana, who joined forces with most of Rajputana. In the end, the heavy mobilization was of no use, and Sanga could use his brilliant diplomatic skills to scare the Sultans. The same year, Ibrahim Lodhi tried to attack the Rana but failed again. It is around this time that Sanga's power was at its zenith. He had thoroughly defeated Gujarat and Delhi, largely captured Malwa. Almost all of Rajasthan accepted his suzzeranity and his influence extent upto vicinity of Agra in east to river Indus in west.

In 1526, Babur invaded, defeated and killed Ibrahim Lodhi, establishing the Mughal Empire. Sanga opposed this development and called his banners to opposed Babur. After successful skirmishes and defeating Mughal forces in Bayana, Sanga suffered a serious defeat despite the numerical superiority because of the use of gunpowder by the Mughals.

After Sangram's death, his son Ratan Singh II was placed on the throne by the generals. Mahmud Khilji, whom Sangram badly defeated, tried to cash the opportunity of a weak Rana, but Ratan Singh was successfully able to defend his state. However, in 1531, he was killed in battle. His brother Rana Vikramaditya succeeded him at a young age, and was unpopular. During his reign, Mewar was invaded by Bahadur Shah of Gujarat, almost culminating in disaster in 1533 as Chittor was put under siege, but the Sultan's forces retreated after a massive ransom was paid. However, Bahadur Shah invaded again a few months later, taking advantage of the dissent in Mewar against Vikramaditya and this time ended up besieging and sacking Chittor in 1535. This resulted in the assassination of Vikramaditya by his cousin Vanvir Singh, who became the new Rana. He quickly moved to secure his position by attempting to assassinate the legitimate heir and last surviving son of Rana Sanga, Udai Singh, but the latter managed to escape and remained in hiding for two years.

In 1540, after gathering an army of supporters, Udai fought Vanvir for the throne and defeated him. Vanvir died in battle and Udai Singh II became the new Rana, putting an end to the dynastic strife. Mewar's troubles were not over though, and during his reign it would face attacks from Marwar, the Suri and later the Mughal Empire under Akbar.

=== Decline and Struggle against Mughals ===
==== Udai Singh II ====
Early in his reign, Sher Shah Suri invaded Mewar after defeating Maldeo Rathore of Marwar at Sammel. Udai Singh had just dealt with the civil war in Mewar and did not have the resources to fight the Sur Empire. He thus surrendered Chittor to Sher Shah Suri on the terms that Sher Shah does not harm the people of Mewar. Sher Shah also accepted the terms as he knew that the siege would be long and costly. Mewar reoccupied the fort after the downfall of the Suri Empire.

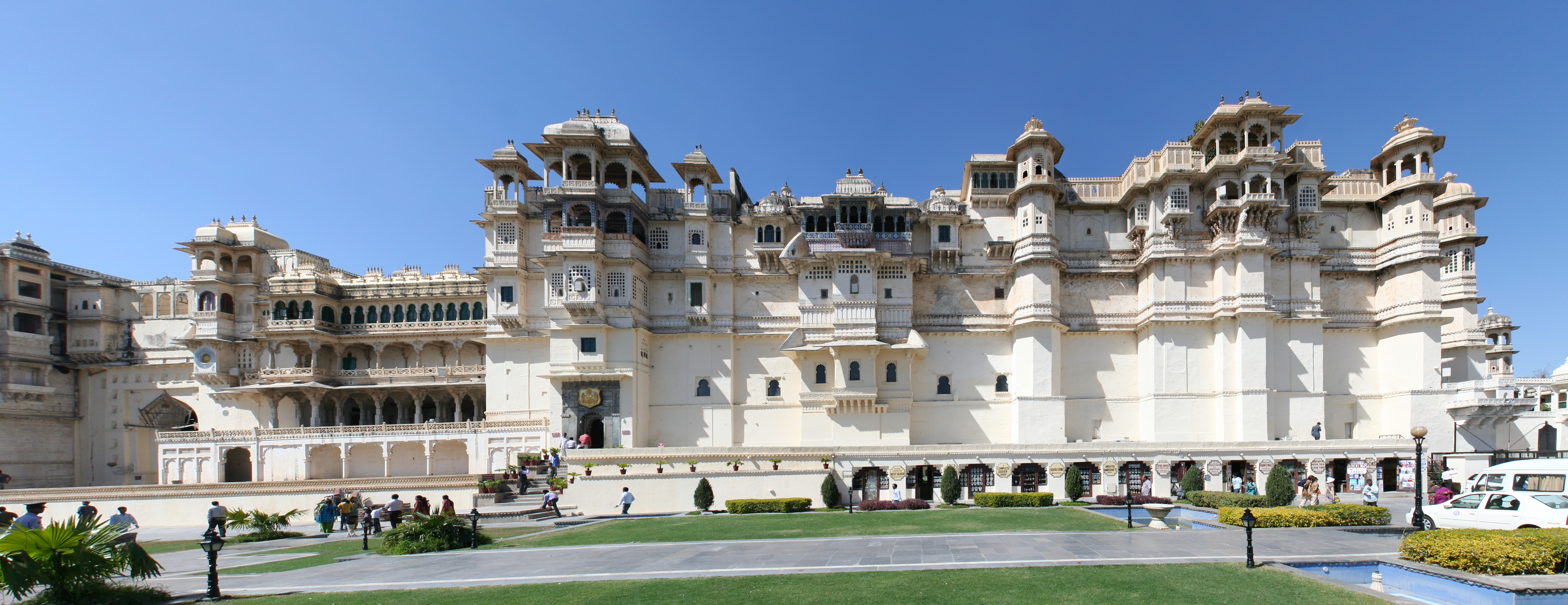
City Palace, Udaipur (front view)

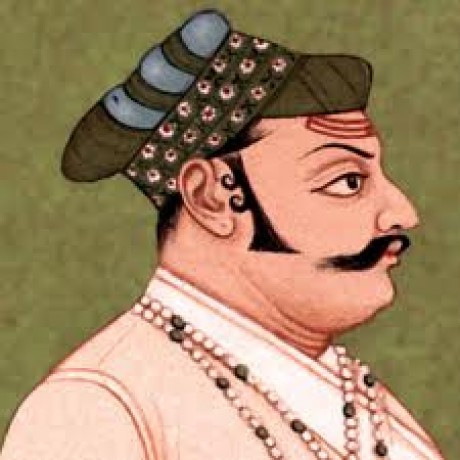
Udai Singh II initiated the decades long struggle with the Mughals

In 1557, Udai Singh was defeated by a joint invasion by Haji Khan and Maldeo Rathore in the Battle of Haramada and was forced to concede Merta. Being aware of the weakened position of Mewar, as well as the resurgent Mughal Empire's expansionist ambitions, the Rana and his nobles felt Chittor was too vulnerable. Thus, work began on the new capital of Udaipur, which remains the most renowned legacy of Udai Singh.

During his reign, Akbar, Babur's grandson, made great efforts to get the Maharana to accept his suzerainty by sending emissaries and envoys. When Udai Singh rejected all offers, Akbar considered invading Mewar. Udai Singh had faith in his forts as they had defended the rulers for decades in the past and were very strong. He was advised by his generals to make adequate arrangements for defence and then retire to the hilly areas of Chittor, which he heeded. Akbar laid siege to the fort of Chittor which he captured after a prolonged siege and massacred the local populace there.

==== Maharana Pratap Singh ====
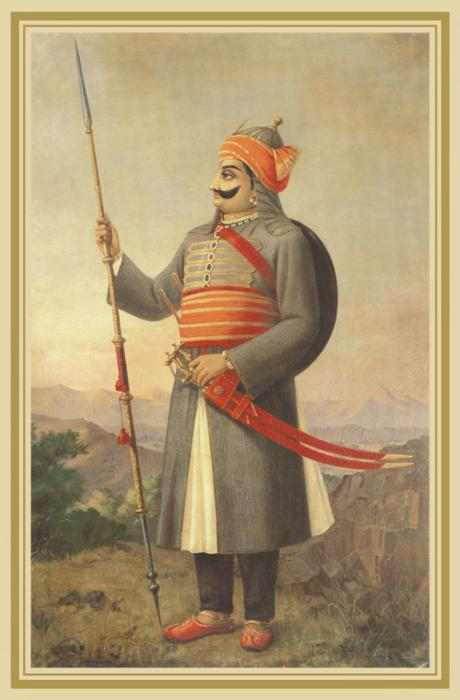
Maharana Pratap (1540–1597), Portrait by Raja Ravi Varma

Udai wanted his second son Jagmal to succeed him, but after his death, his eldest son, Pratap was enthroned by the generals. The order of damage inflicted by Mughal forces in 1568 to Chittor meant that Pratap was not willing to make any concessions to Akbar. He saw Mughals as invaders who were resisted by his father and grandfather. Within 1 year, diplomatic missions by top Mughal officials like Man Singh, Bhagwant Das, Todar Mal failed to convince Pratap to accept Mughal dominance, appear in Mughal court, pay tribute and enlist as a Mansabdar.

Pratap soon started to prepare for a big battle. He retired from his fortress until Chittor was recaptured, forbade the use of silver and gold in the kingdom, and forbade sowing of crops to prevent Mughal forces from acquiring supplies from his own land. The big battle came in the form of the Battle of Haldighati with Akbar sending Man Singh against the forces of Mewar headed by Pratap. The Battle of haldhighat though a victory proved very costly to Akbar and further expansions in Mewar were halted for a short time. After which it reassumed again with different generals over a period of time. In this phase, Maharana only defended his territory however when rebellions in different part of Mughal Empire concentrated the attention of Imperial Army there. He recovered most of Mewar expect Chittorgarh and Mandalgarh which remained in Mughal hands.

Today, Maharana Pratap is seen as the scion of Mughal Resistance the one who didn't bend his knees against overwhelming might of Mughal Empire which has taken the form of folklore.

==== Amar Singh ====
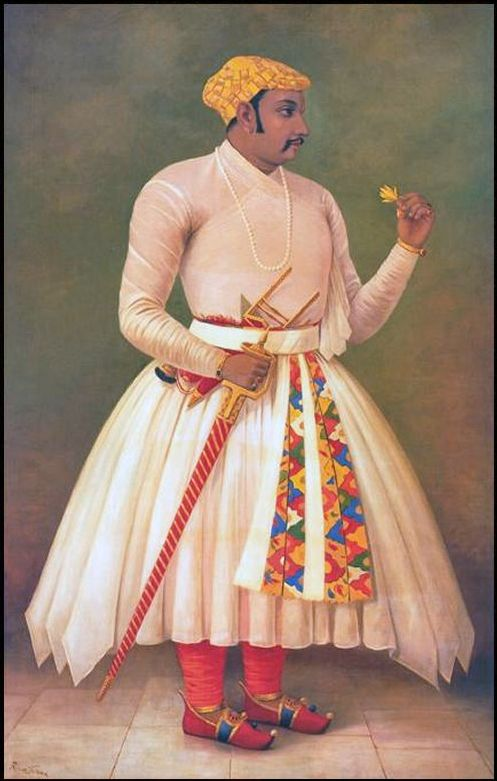
Amar Singh I was the Rana who signed the treaty with the Mughals

Pratap's 38-year-old son Amar succeeded him. In 1600, his kingdom was invaded by Akbar's son Salim in which Mughals were defeated and their top generals like Sultan Khan Ghori were killed. Akbar tried to make another attempt to invade Mewar in 1605 but the invasion was cut short by his death. After Akbar, his son Salim succeeded as Jahangir and sent a large force under his son Parviz to invade Mewar. To defend against Parviz, Amar built a new capital at Chawand, a hilly location in Mewar. Then preparations were made to defend against the Mughals. In 1606, in the Battle of Diwair, Mughals were badly defeated. During this time, Amar' son Sagar defected from Rajputs to Mughals and was appointed at Chittor by Jahangir. In 1608, a massive army under Mahabat Khan was sent to Mewar through Mandal and Chittor. This army was badly defeated and had to retreat because of continuous raids by Rajput forces. In 1609, Mahabat Khan was replaced with Abdullah Khan who was able to defeat Mewar in several battles from 1609 to 1611. In an attack by Abdullah Khan, Amar Singh was forced to abandon the capital of Chawand.

The Mughals continued to chase the Maharana for several years but no one was able to capture the Rana. After this, in 1613, Jahangir himself came to Rajputana to supervise the campaign. His son Khurram led the campaign on the ground. Rajputs were easily able to seek refuge in the hilly tracks of Rajputana and the Mughals largely failed to penetrate it. They were finally able to penetrate it in 1614 when they engaged with Mewar forces and established outposts. Many attempts were made by Jahangir to make settlements with the Maharana and the final attempt in 1615 succeeded when Amar Singh agreed to meet with Prince Khurram.

==== Treaty with Mughals ====
In February 1615, Khurram and Amar Singh met in Gogundah. Tributes were exchanged between the Maharana and the Prince. Following terms were accepted by both the parties.

- Maharana's eldest son would serve under the Emperor.
- Maharana would provide a 1000 horsemen contingent in the Mughal Army.
- Maharana would never try to return to Chittorgarh.
  Ranks were provided to Maharana's heir Karan. Other official honors and ranks were also exchanged. Jahangir got marble statues of Amar and Karan Singh constructed in Deccan and installed in a garden in Agra.
- No martial alliance with Mughals.

Throughout the rest of his life, Amar spent time in Udaipur, making administrative reforms to his kingdom and restoring it. He died in 1620 at the age of 60.

Karan succeeded his father Amar in 1620. He reformed his kingdom and repaired several temples including the Ranakpur Jain temple damaged by Mughal commanders. Karan also helped prince Khurram and gave him refuge when he had rebelled against his father in 1623. Karan also supported Mahabat Khan, who rebelled against Jahangir. Khurram stayed for 4 months and exchanged turbans with the Maharana which is still stored in Pratap Museum. When Jahangir died in 1627, Khurram passed through Mewar and met with Karan again. Khurram was crowned the Mughal emperor as Shah Jahan. Karan died 2 months later. After Karan's death, his son Jagat succeeded him in 1628. He was sent a robe of honor by Shah Jahan. Jagat invaded Dungarpur because it enlisted itself in the Mughal Mansabdari system. In the resulting war, Dungarpur lost and its ruler was killed. He oversaw the construction of the famous Jag Mandir during his reign.

=== Spoiled relations with Mughals ===
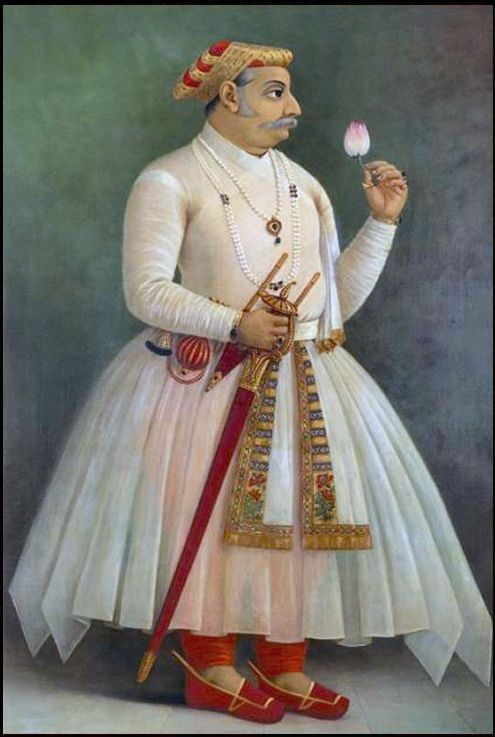
Maharana Raj Singh (1629–1680)

Jagat Singh died after a 24 year long reign and was succeeded by his son Raj. Towards the end of Jagat's reign, Mughal-Mewar relations had been strained. Shah Jahan sent a robe of honor for Raj Singh as well but the relations could not be restored. Raj continued making restorations to the Chittor fort, going against the Mughal-Mewar treaty of 1615. Maharana had constructed walls around the fort and had reduced the contingent size given to the Mughals. Maharana then sent a diplomatic mission to the Mughals to settle the issue. But eventually Shah Jahan ordered his son Aurangzeb and grandson Mahmud to invade Chittor and demolish the new wall in 1654. Eventually Shah Jahan withdrew Mughal forces and letters of settlement and assurances were exchanged.

==== War of succession ====
In 1658, the Mughal war of succession was going on and Raj Singh took an advantage and invaded the Mughals and successfully loot and plunder in adjacent areas. Throughout the war, Raj Singh remained neutral among the fighting brothers but he disliked Dara Shikoh and liked Aurangzeb. He maintained contact and good relations with Prince Aurangzeb and sent his emissaries when Aurangzeb won the war of succession. After the war of succession, Raj Singh was able to win the favor of Aurangzeb and was awarded territories of Mandal and Bansawara and he was granted ranks. In 1658, Raj Singh embarked on his own expeditions using pretence of a ceremonial "Tikadaur", traditionally taken in enemy land. The Maharana swooped down on various Mughal posts in 1658. Levies were imposed on outposts and tracts like Mandal, Banera, Shahpura, Sawar, Jahazpur, Phulia etc. which were then under Mughal control, and some areas were annexed. He next attacked pargana of Malpura, Tonk, Chatsu, Lalsot and Sambhar. He expanded the Mewar kingdom to bigger heights than before.

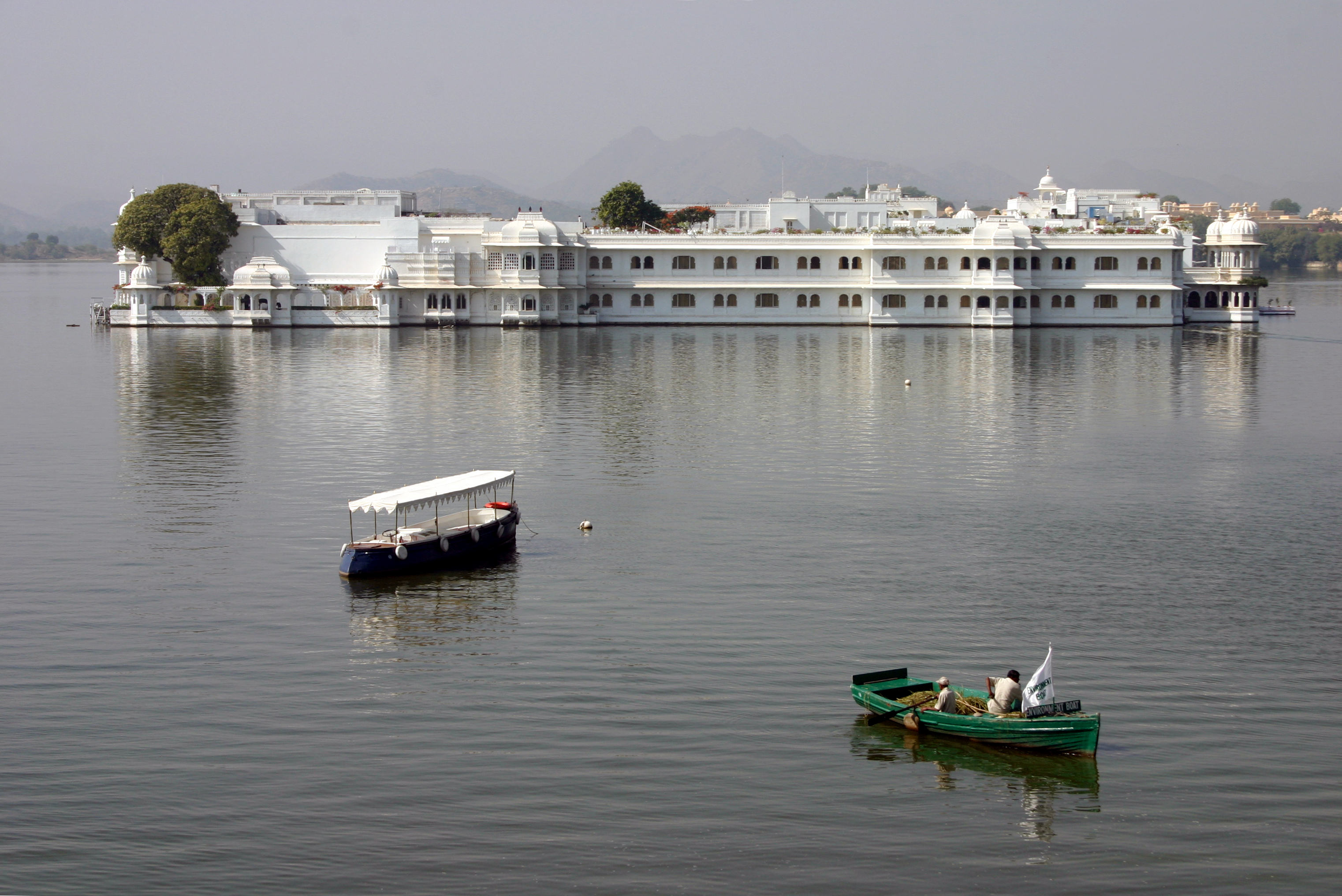
Lake Palace in Lake Pichola

Mughal Mewar relations worsened further when in 1660, Raj Singh eloped with Charumati, who was going to be married to Aurangzeb. This was seen as a hostile act and several territories were confiscated from Mewar. Attempts were made to stop this confiscation but were ultimately failed. He later also participated in Rajput War (1679–1707) and defeated Mughals.

==== Oppressions of Hindus ====
When in the 1660s, Aurangzeb ordered demolitions of several important Hindu temples, Raj Singh made several efforts to secure safety of Hindu Symbols. Famous symbols rescued include the Shrinathji installed in Nathawada in Udaipur in 1662. In 1679, when Jaziya was imposed on non-Muslims in the Mughal empire, Raj Singh possibly protested against Aurangzeb by writing him a letter. Such events further spoiled relations with the Mughal emperor. During this period, Maharana continued to raid and loot adjacent territories.

==== Rajput-Mughal war 1679–1707 ====
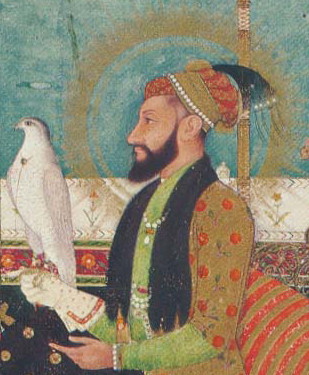
Aurangzeb, the reason of a long-standing conflict of Mughals with Mewar

During the 1670s, Aurangzeb was engaging with his rivals, the Rathores. In 1679, Raj granted 12 villages to Ajit Singh Rathore. Aurangzeb begged Raj to remain loyal to him and not support Ajit, but this was not heeded by Raj Singh.

Aurangzeb sent multiple of his generals to fight with the Rana but Raj Singh defeated all of them and then Aurangzeb himself came down to the battleground. On the suggestion of his war council, Raj depopulated Udaipur and abandoned the city. In January 1680, Mughals reached Udaipur and damaged the city heavily. A major force of Mughals under Hasan Ali Khan was defeated at Nainwara. Finding it difficult to defeat Rajputs in hilly tracks, Aurangzeb left Udaipur in 1680. Raj Singh carried out sudden raids on Mughal and Malwa forces keeping them terrified. Such raids often created heavy disruption in Mughal forces.At the height of the Rajput-Mughal war in 1680, Raj Singh died, possibly due to poisoning by Aurangzeb loyalists or by illness and fever. He was succeeded by his son Jai Singh. Under Jai, sudden attacks on Mughals continued. Mughal forces under Dilair Khan were defeated by Mewar in the same year. Raj had made attempts to sponsor a rebellion in the Mughal empire by tempting Aurangzeb's son Akbar. His attempt was cut short by his death, but was successfully carried out by Jai in 1681. Aurangzeb overcame this by writing a false letter to his son telling him to continue deceitful collaboration with Rajputs in order to destroy them. This was intercepted by Rajputs who were tricked into believing that Akbar's alliance with them was a hoax and distanced themselves with him.

Soon, in the same year, Aurangzeb was able to strike a settlement with Jai through his son Muhammad Azam to prevent the Akbar's rebellion to grow big. In 1681, Jai Singh agreed to pay Jaziya, send a contingent to the deccan under the Mughals and they were granted several territories in adjacent regions in a meeting with Muhammad Azam. Following the settlement, ranks and honors were exchanged. Jai Singh was not handed the possession of the granted territories and over the next one decade, he would penalize the emperor by stopping the payment of Jaziya and the Aurangzeb would penalize him for defaulting on Jaziya in other instances by taking away other territories.

Jai died in 1698 and his son Amar Singh II succeeded him in 1699. In 1699, right after Amar Singh II ascended to the throne, he invaded Durganpur, Bansawara and Devaliya. Rulers of these regions appealed to Mughal court for justice but in most cases, Maharana prevailed. In 1707, Aurangzeb died and his sons started the war of succession. During this war, Amar supported Prince Muazzam who later won the war and was crowned Bahadur Shah I. Taking advantage of the war, Amar also captured the granted cities that were under Mughal control like Pur, Mandal and Shahpura.

==== Triple alliance against the Mughals ====
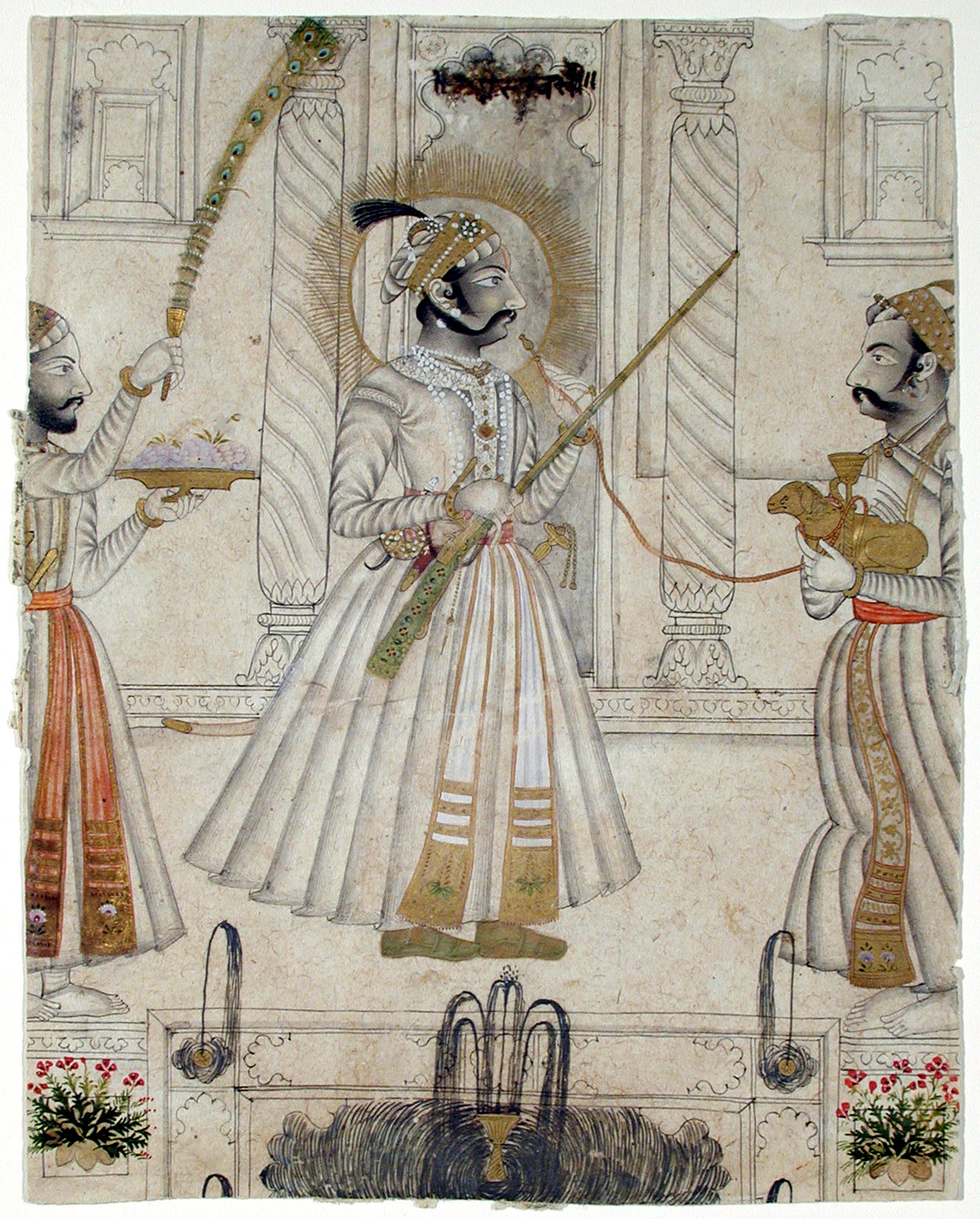
Amar Singh, ruler Mewar during the peak of the Mughal-Mewar wars

After the war of succession, Bahadur Shah I tried to get hold of the states of Amber and Marwar. These states had captured significant territories after Aurangzeb's death in 1707. Bahadur Shah was able to take the Marwar state without any resistance but had to take Jodhpur and the Amber state with force. He then chased Amar Singh II into Mewar territory. Amar Singh made a matrimonial alliance with Sawai Jai Singh of Amber by marrying his daughter Chandrakumari with him. Amar Singh, Ajit Singh and Jai Singh made a triple alliance to take back Amber and Marwar. The combined Rajput forces of the alliance attempted to capture Amber in 1708 but failed. They also attempted to capture Jodhpur and succeeded. Soon, the battle of Sambhar was fought in which major Mughal commanders were killed and Rajputs won. Pur and Mandal were recaptured by Mewar. As a result of this battle, states of Amber and Marwar were restored. Though, the rulers were posted in Gujarat and Kabul which they denied to follow.

Soon after the settlement, in 1709, Ajit Singh, Jai Singh and Amar Singh started to prepare for a large war with the Mughals with 70,000 cavalry to quell their deployments in Gujarat and Kabul. Bahadur Shah tried to persuade them to not start a war and at the height of negotiations, Amar Singh II died. He was succeeded by his son Sangram Singh II.

Right after coronation of Sangram II, Bahadur Shah granted the territories of Mandal and Pur to one Ranabaaz Khan Mewati. Sangram did not give the possession of these territories to Mewati which lead to the Battle of Bandanwara in 1711. In the resulting battle, Mewati was killed and Sangram retained Mandal and Pur. Any retaliatory action by Bahadur Shah I were cut short by his death in 1712.

Soon, a war of succession broke between the sons of Bahadur Shah and eventually the only surviving son, Jahandar Shah became Emperor but only for 8 months, and was defeated and killed by his cousin Farrukhsiyar with the help of the Sayyid Brothers.

=== Decline of Mughal Empire and Maratha Influence ===
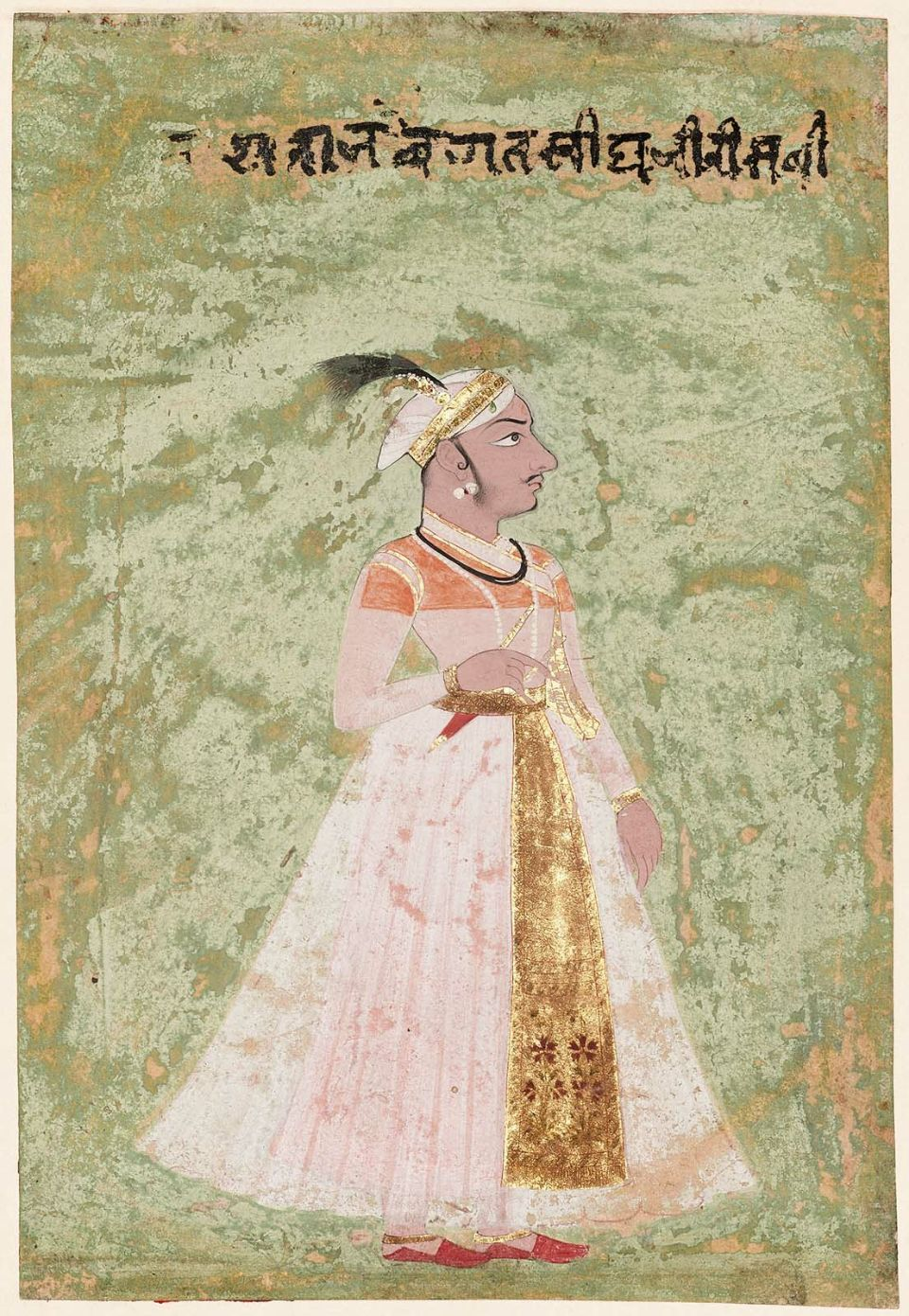
Jagat Singh II who made an alliance with Marathas, which eventually led to its financial devastation.

Soon, Sangram made good relations with Farrukhsiyar and honors were exchanged per the traditions. Sangram extracted heavy tributes from these rulers. He was also allowed to mint his own coins in 1713.

==== Resistance ====
Starting from 1711, during Sangram's reign, the Marathas started raiding into the Rajputana in the states of Dungarpur, Banswara, and Bundi. They were driven off in their first attempts. Several attempts to form united fronts against such raids throughout 1710s and 1720s failed. Sangram II died in 1734 and was succeeded by his son Jagat Singh II. To counter the Marathas, Maharana Jagat Singh of Mewar convened a conference of Rajput rulers in Hurda in 1734, but no agreement materialised. In 1735, Mughals tried to defend against the Maratha penetration by sending a force under Qamar uddin but failed and Marathas reached Jaipur.

==== Subordinance ====
Peshwa Baji Rao I attempted to persuade Jagat to settle terms of Chauth, a tributary tax but such attempts failed. However, Jagat continued to pay a sum of money equivalent to the revenue of one territory to Holkars, the province of Marathas. In February 1736, the Peshwa arranged a friendly visit to Maharana Jagat and met him at Udaipur. During this meeting, he was able to secure chauth from the Maharana. Hence friendly relations were established between Marathas and Mewar. With the help of the Holkars, Jagat was able to secure the throne of Jaipur for his relative Madho Singh. In 1750, Ishwari Singh, the other contender for the throne committed suicide under the financial pressure by the Marathas and Madho Singh was able to capture the throne completely. Madho was able to stay afloat because of heavy investment by Jagat Singh.

==== Financial devastation ====
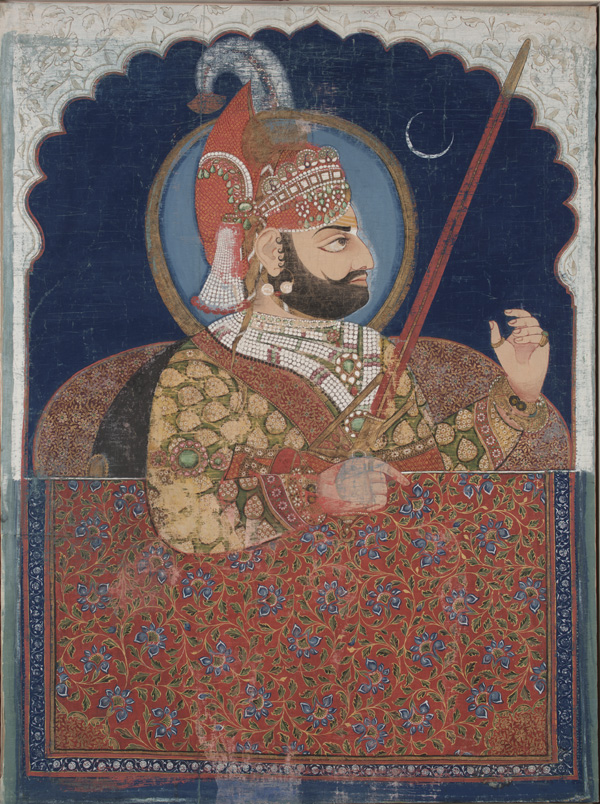
Bhim Singh aligned Mewar with the British

Jagat Singh died in 1751 and his imprisoned son Pratap but he could rule only for 3 years and died in 1754 and was succeeded by his young son Raj. During his rule, Maratha's continuous and increasing demand for tribute financially destroyed Mewar. Raj could only rule for 7 years and died without an heir. Such financial devastation continued under his uncle Ari's rule, under whom, Mewar was raided by the Marathas many times from 1761 to 1773.

After Ari's death in 1773, his underaged son Hamir became the Maharana and under him, a lot of power rested in the hands of his mother Sadar Kanwar and her trusted assistant Ram Pyari. Hammir died in 1778 and was succeeded by his brother Bhim. During Bhim's reign, Mewar was raided multiple times by the Pindaris, an unregulated military.

=== Princely State to accession in India ===
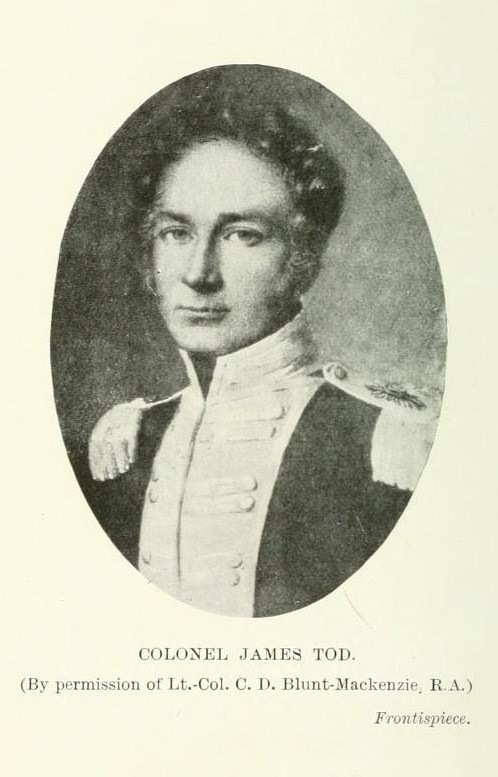
James Tod, the political agent of Udaipur to the EIC from 1818 to 1822

By 1818, the armies of Holkar, Scindia, and Tonk had plundered Mewar, pauperising Bhim Singh. As early as 1805, Maharana Bhim Singh of Mewar approached the East India Company (EIC) for assistance but the Treaty of 1803 with Scindia prevented the British from entertaining the request. But by 1817, the British too were anxious to have alliances with Rajput rulers and the Treaty of Friendship, Alliances and Unity was concluded between Mewar and EIC on 13 January 1818.

After the Third Anglo-Maratha War and under the treaty, the British Government agreed to protect the territory of Mewar, in return for which Mewar acknowledged British supremacy and agreed to abstain from political associations with other states and to pay one-fourth of its revenues as tribute for 5 years, and three-eight in perpetuity.

A constitution for Udaipur State was adopted on 23 May 1947.

== See also ==
- Nobles of Udaipur
- Kingdom of Marwar
- Rajputana
- Mewar Residency

== Bibliography ==
- Nandini Sinha (1991). "A Study of the Origin Myths Situating the Guhilas in the History of Mewar (A.D. Seventh to Thirteenth Centuries)". Proceedings of the Indian History Congress. 52. Indian History Congress: 63–71. JSTOR 44142569.
- Ram Vallabh Somani (1976). History of Mewar, from Earliest Times to 1751 A.D. Mateshwari. OCLC 2929852.
- Chandra, Satish (2006), Medieval India: From Sultanat to the Mughals (1206–1526), vol. 2, Har-Anand Publications, ISBN 9788124110669
- R. C. Majumdar (1977). Ancient India. Motilal Banarsidass. ISBN 9788120804364.
- D. C. Ganguly (1957). "Northern India During The Eleventh and Twelfth Centuries". In R. C. Majumdar (ed.). The Struggle for Empire. The History and Culture of the Indian People. Bharatiya Vidya Bhavan. OCLC 26241249.
- Krishna Narain Seth (1978). The Growth of the Paramara Power in Malwa. Progress.
- Rima Hooja (2006). A history of Rajasthan. Rupa & Co. ISBN 9788129108906. OCLC 80362053.
- Freitag, Jason (2009). Serving empire, serving nation: James Tod and the Rajputs of Rajasthan. Leiden: Brill. ISBN 978-90-04-17594-5.
