= Ahar Cenotaphs =

Memorial site in Udaipur, Rajasthan, India

Coordinates: 24°35′16″N 73°43′10″E

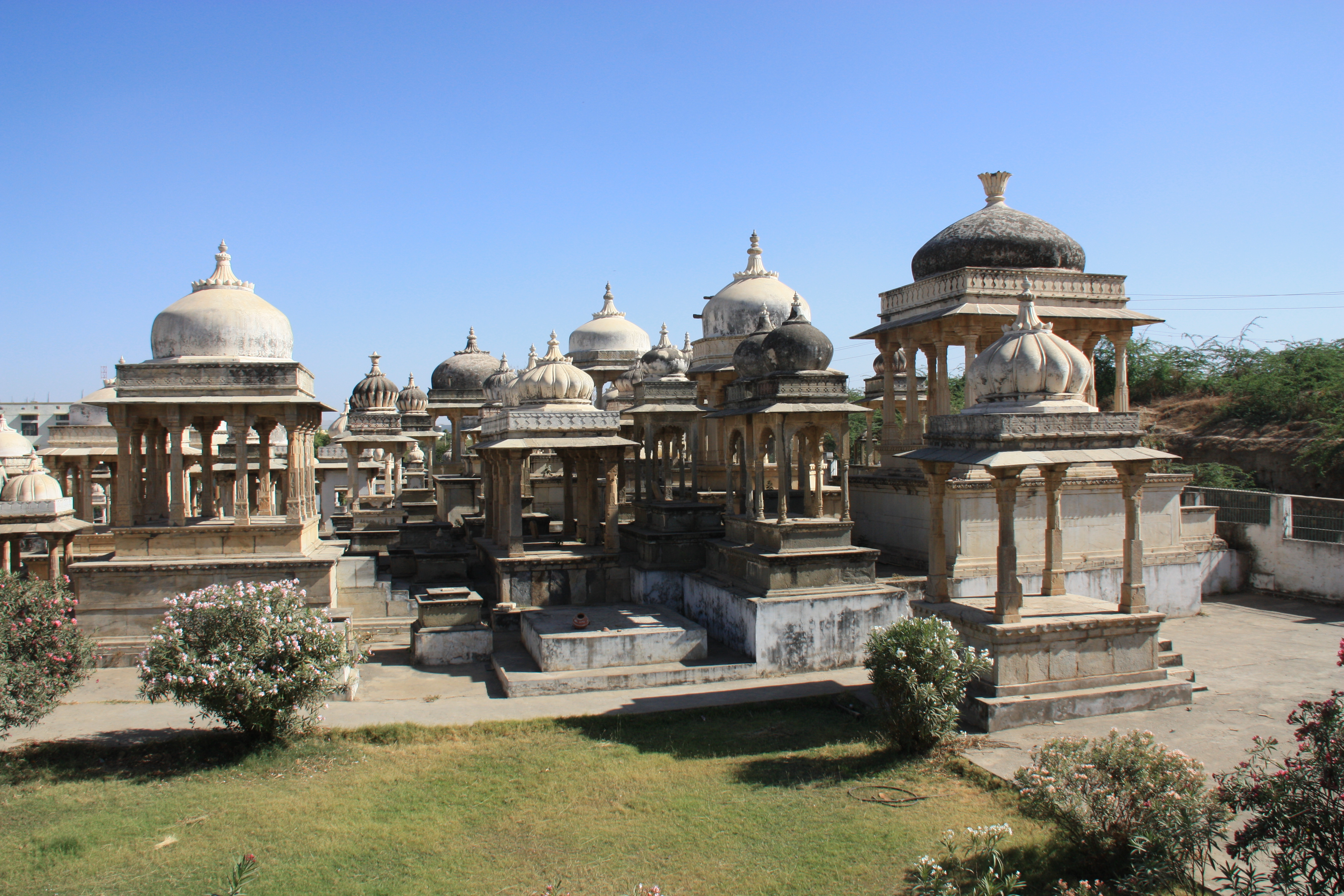
- Interactive map of Ahar Cenotaphs
- Type: Monument
- Location: Ahar, India
- Region: Udaipur, Rajasthan

The Ahar Cenotaphs are a group of cenotaphs located in Ahar, Udaipur, Rajasthan, India. The site contains more than 250 elevated dome-shaped pavilions, or chhatris, of the royal house of Mewar, which were built over approximately 350 years. It has approximately 19 cenotaphs of various Maharanas who were cremated here. This group of cenotaphs is also known as Mahasati, or the "Great Place of Sati." It is also the place where, at times, the wives or concubines of the Maharana were either burned or committed sati with him. For this reason, the place is also known as Mahasati (transl. Great Place of Sati).

These cenotaphs are arranged side by side in a vast enclosure and vary in size, ranging from a small chhatri with four columns to a mahal. Despite differences in layout and details, they all follow the same basic design. Each structure features a dome supported by columns, forming a circular pavilion. It is set on a raised terrace, accessed by a flight of steps. The entire structure, including the terrace, stairs, columns, and domes, is made of white marble from Kankroli. The most remarkable among these cenotaphs are those of Amar Singh and Sangram Singh II. These cenotaphs are built in the Jain architectural style.

== History and significance ==
Ahar was an ancient city situated near Udaipur in the center of the circular mountain valley. It was historically known as Tamba Nagari and served as a capital for Tonwar (Touar) dynasty, later Vikramaditya move the capital to Avanti (Ujjain). During the reign of Asa Ditya from Guhila dynasty, a new town called Anandpur was established on the ruins of Tamba Nagari, which gradually declined after the rise of Chittorgarh as the new capital. In total, there are nineteen major cenotaphs honoring various Maharanas of the Mewar dynasty since the reign of Udai Singh II. The cenotaphs of Maharana Amar Singh I and Sangram Singh II are among the earliest and most prominent structures in the complex. The major cenotaphs includes Sangram Singh, Swaroop Singh, Shambhu Singh, Fateh Singh, Bhupal Singh, Bhagwat Singh Mewar, and Sajjan Singh. A metal Buddha dating back to 10th Century AD is located in the complex. The site is also referred to as "Mahasati" or the "Great Place of Sati," as it was the site of self-immolation by queens and concubines of deceased rulers. Effigies at the site symbolize the number of women who performed sati alongside the kings. Arvind Singh Mewar was the last Mewar to be cremated here on 17 March 2025.

== Architecture and Layout ==
The Ahar complex has more than 250 elevated dome-shaped pavilions or chhatris. These structures vary in size and design, from four-pillared canopies to larger marble constructed Mahals. All cenotaphs follow a common architectural pattern featuring a raised plinth, an edifice, and a central dome supported by pillars. White marble sourced from Kankroli was extensively used in their construction. The two cenotaphs of Maharana Sangram Singh and Amar Singh I are among the grandest at Ahar, they are built on colossal terraces and crowned with marble domes supported by sculptured pilasters. These mausoleums, built in the Jain architectural tradition using marble from Kankroli, consist of domed pavilions on raised platforms, with steps leading to the terrace, exemplifying the native style of horizontal dome construction. The constructions reassemble the Tombs of Halicarnassus. The cenotaph of Maharana Sangram Singh II, built in 1734, is particularly notable. It features an octagonal central dome supported by eight pillars and a porch with fifty-six intricately designed columns. The exterior is adorned with carvings of Lord Shiva, tridents, lotuses, and even depictions of the Maharana and his 21 wives who were cremated with him. The cremation ground known as Maha Sati at Ahar serves as the royal necropolis of the Maharanas of Mewar, with white marble cenotaphs arranged in a vast enclosure. An inscription from the time indicates that the construction of Sangram Singh's cenotaphs cost over ₹40 lakh (equivalent to ₹343 crore or US$36 million in 2026) in the 18th century.

== Archaeological Context and Modern Developments ==
Adjacent to the cenotaphs is the Ahar Archaeological Museum, which houses rare artifacts and relics, including pottery dating to 1700 BCE and a 10th-century metal image of Buddha. These exhibits highlight Ahar's ancient historical significance beyond its royal association. Ruins of the ancient city, known as Dhul Kot ("the fort of ashes"), have yielded tenth-century inscriptions and coins. The region also contains remains of Jain and Hindu temples with remarkable stone carvings. In the 1990s, Arvind Singh Mewar led efforts to restore several cenotaphs in the complex. He himself was cremated here in March 2025, continuing the tradition of royal cremations at Ahar.
