= Guhila =

Rawal of Mewar from 566 to 586

- Rawal

Rawal of Mewar
- Reign: 566–586
- Predecessor: Position established
- Successor: Rawal Bhoja
- Dynasty: Guhila dynasty

Guhila, also called Guhil, was the Rajput ruler of Idar and Mewar from 566 to 586. He is known as the founder of the Guhila dynasty, the first ruling dynasty of the Kingdom of Mewar.

== Sources ==
Earliest reference to Guhila is found on a silver coin near Agra that mentions Sri Guhila on it.

According to the Atpur inscription dating VS 1034, and Chittor inscription from VS 1331, Guhila is said to have migrated from Anandpur (identified as Vadnagar) to Mewar region.
