= Ranasimha =

- Rawal

Rawal of the Guhila dynasty
- Predecessor: Vikramsimha
- Successor: Kshemasimha
- Issue: Kshemasimha; Rahapa
- House: House of Guhila
- Father: Vikramsimha

Rawal Ranasimha, also known as, Ratnasimha or Ratan Singh, was the ruler of the Guhila dynasty of the Kingdom of Mewar in the later 12th century. He succeeded his father Vikramsimha. He was succeeded by his son Kshemasimha.
His name became the regnant title of the Kingdom who descended from his second son Rahapa. Hammir Singh, a descendant of Ratan Singh, reconquered Mewar and became the first ruler of Sisodia dynasty after the main branch of the family went extinct after the siege of Chittorgarh by Alauddin Khalji.

== Bibliography ==
- Somani, Ram Vallabh (1976). History of Mewar, from Earliest Times to 1751 A.D. Mateshwari.
- D. C. Ganguly (1957). "Northern India During The Eleventh and Twelfth Centuries". In R. C. Majumdar (ed.). The Struggle for Empire. The History and Culture of the Indian People. Bharatiya Vidya Bhavan. OCLC 26241249.
