= Rawal Samarasimha =

Samarasimha
- Maharajakula; Raula; Maharawal; Rawal

Maharawal of the Guhila dynasty
- Reign: 1272-1301
- Predecessor: Tejasimha
- Successor: Ratnasimha

Maharawal Samarsimha or Maharawal Samar Singh was the ruler of the Guhila dynasty from 1272 to 1301. He was the son of Rawal Tejasimha and father of Ratnasimha.

He assisted the ruler of Gujarat, Sarangdeva Baghela against a Turkish Invasion. This Turkish invader is speculated to be Ghiyas ud din Balban or Alauddin Khalji. If the invader was Alauddin Khalji, then his motives for invasion would not be devastation or annexation but passage to invade Gujrat. Since Alauddin was refused passage from Marwar, so the passage was drawn from Mewar. Samarsimha offered strong resistance from Mewar but Alauddin was able to do minor attack on Hindu shrines. but no major devastation was found.

== See also ==
List of Mewar–Delhi conflicts
