= Samantasimha (Guhila) =

Samanasimha
- Maharajadhiraja; Maharaja; Rawal

Rawal of the Guhila dynasty
- Reign: 1177–1192
- Predecessor: Kshemasimha
- Successor: Kumarasimha
- Died: 1192; Tarain, Taraori near Karnal
- Issue: Kumarasimha
- House: Guhila dynasty

Samantasimha or Samant Singh was the ruler of the Guhila dynasty during the second half of the 12th century. He succeeded his father Kshemasimha. After the death of the powerful Chaulakya king Kumarapal, Samantsingh successfully invaded Gujarat. He was later deposed from Mewar. He sought refuge in Vagad and established himself there but was soon expelled from there as well.

Historian G.H. Ojha theorizes that he eventually died fighting in the Second Battle of Tarain.

== Background ==
By the mid-12th century, the Guhilas had been subjugated by the Chaulukyas of Gujarat.

=== Expedition of Gujarat ===
After the death of its very powerful ruler Kumarapala in 1172 and ascension of his son Ajayapala, Samantsingh found it opportune to invade the territory of Gujarat. This invasion coincided with an ensued confusion over the kingdom of Chaulukyas after the death of Kumarapala.

Ajayapala had to initially face defeat at hands of Samantsingh. Later, one of the feudatories of the Chalukyas, Dharavarsha of Chandravati, sent his younger brother, Prahalad who defeated and repelled Samantsingh. After this expedition, he was able to extend his influence beyond the western boundaries of Mewar.

=== Invasion by Kirtipal ===
After the Battle of Kasahrada, Chaulukya King Mularaja passed away soon and was succeeded by Bhima II, who was a minor at the time. Many feudatories of Gujarat at this time struggled to increase their power and the kingdom remained very unstable. This gave an opportunity to the Chahamana ruler of Jalore, Kirtipala to invade Mewar in 1179 and depose Samantsingh. Samantsingh had to take shelter in Vagad where he ousted its Guhila rulers. He couldn't stay in Vagad long either from where he was soon ousted by Bhim II.

=== Later life ===
After being expelled from Vagad, Samantsingh sought shelter under Prithviraja III of Ajmer with whom he participated in the Second battle of Tarain. He was killed in this battle.

== Bibliography ==
- Ram Vallabh Somani (1976). History of Mewar, from Earliest Times to 1751 A.D. Mateshwari. OCLC 2929852.
- Rima Hooja (2006). A history of Rajasthan. Rupa & Co. ISBN 9788129108906. OCLC 80362053.
