= Tejasimha =

Rawal of Mewar from 1252 to 1273

- Rawal

Rawal of Mewar
- Reign: 1252–1273
- Predecessor: Jaitrasimha
- Successor: Rawal Samarsimha
- Spouse: Rupadevi (born Songara)

Rawal Tejasimha, also known as Rawal Tej Singh, was a monarch of the Guhila dynasty who ruled from 1252 to 1273 after his father Jaitrasimha and before his son Samarsimha. He married the Songara princess Rupadevi.

== Struggle with Balban ==
He fought a battle with Visaldeo Baghela, the ruler of Gujarat. In this battle, Tejasimha lost. From 1253-1254, he fought with Ghiyas ud din Balban. In this battle, Balban had to retreat without any success. In 1255, Qutlug Khan revolted against Balban and sought refuge in Chittor, after which Balban invaded Mewar again and had to retreat.

== Reign ==
During his rule, Chittor became a center for Jainism, with his major ministers also being followers of Jainism.

== Bibliography ==
- Ram Vallabh Somani (1976). History of Mewar, from Earliest Times to 1751 A.D. Mateshwari. OCLC 2929852.
