= Guhila dynasty =

Indian dynasty in what is now Rajasthan

- Country: Kingdom of Mewar
- Founded: 566; 1460 years ago
- Founder: Rawal Guhil
- Final ruler: Ratnasimha (main branch)
- Seat: Ahar; Nagda; Chittor
- Deposition: 26 August 1303 (main branch); 1948 (cadet branch)
- Cadet branches: Sisodia dynasty

The Guhilas of Medapata colloquially known as the Guhilas of Mewar were a dynasty that ruled the Kingdom of Mewar (Medapata, modern Mewar) region in present-day Rajasthan state of India. Their capitals included Nagahrada (Nagda) and Aghata (Ahar). For this reason, they are also known as the Nagda-Ahar branch of the Guhilas.

The Guhila kings initially ruled as feudatories of the Pratiharas during the 8th and the 9th century. After the decline of the Pratiharas, they assumed sovereignty in the 10th century, during the reigns of Bharttripatta II and Allata. During the 10th-13th centuries, they were involved in military conflicts with several of their neighbours, including the Paramaras, the Chahamanas, the Delhi Sultanate, the Chaulukyas, and the Vaghelas.

In the mid-12th century, the dynasty divided into two branches. The senior branch (whose rulers are called Rawal in the later medieval literature) ruled from Chitrakuta (modern Chittorgarh), and ended with Ratnasimha's defeat against the Delhi Sultanate at the 1303 Siege of Chittorgarh. The junior branch rose from the village of Sisoda with the title Rana and established the Sisodia Rajput dynasty.

== Origin ==
The history of the Guhilas has been obscured by bardic legends. In the 7th century, three different Guhila dynasties are known to have ruled in present-day Rajasthan in Nagda-Ahar, Kishkindha (Kalyanpur) and Dhavagarta (Dhor). None of these dynasties claimed any prestigious origin in their 7th-century records. The Guhilas of Dhavagarta explicitly mentioned the Mori kings as their overlords, and the early kings of the other two dynasties also bore the titles indicating their subordinate status.

By the 10th century, the Guhilas of Nagda-Ahar were the only among the three dynasties to have survived. By this time, their political status had increased, and the Guhila kings had assumed high royal titles such as Maharajadhiraja. During this period, the dynasty started claiming a prestigious origin, stating that its founder Guhadatta was a Brahmin who had migrated from Anandapura (present-day Vadnagar in Gujarat). The 977 CE Atpur inscription of Shaktikumara lists 20 Guhila kings in an unbroken line of succession, starting with Guhadatta and ending with Shaktikumara.

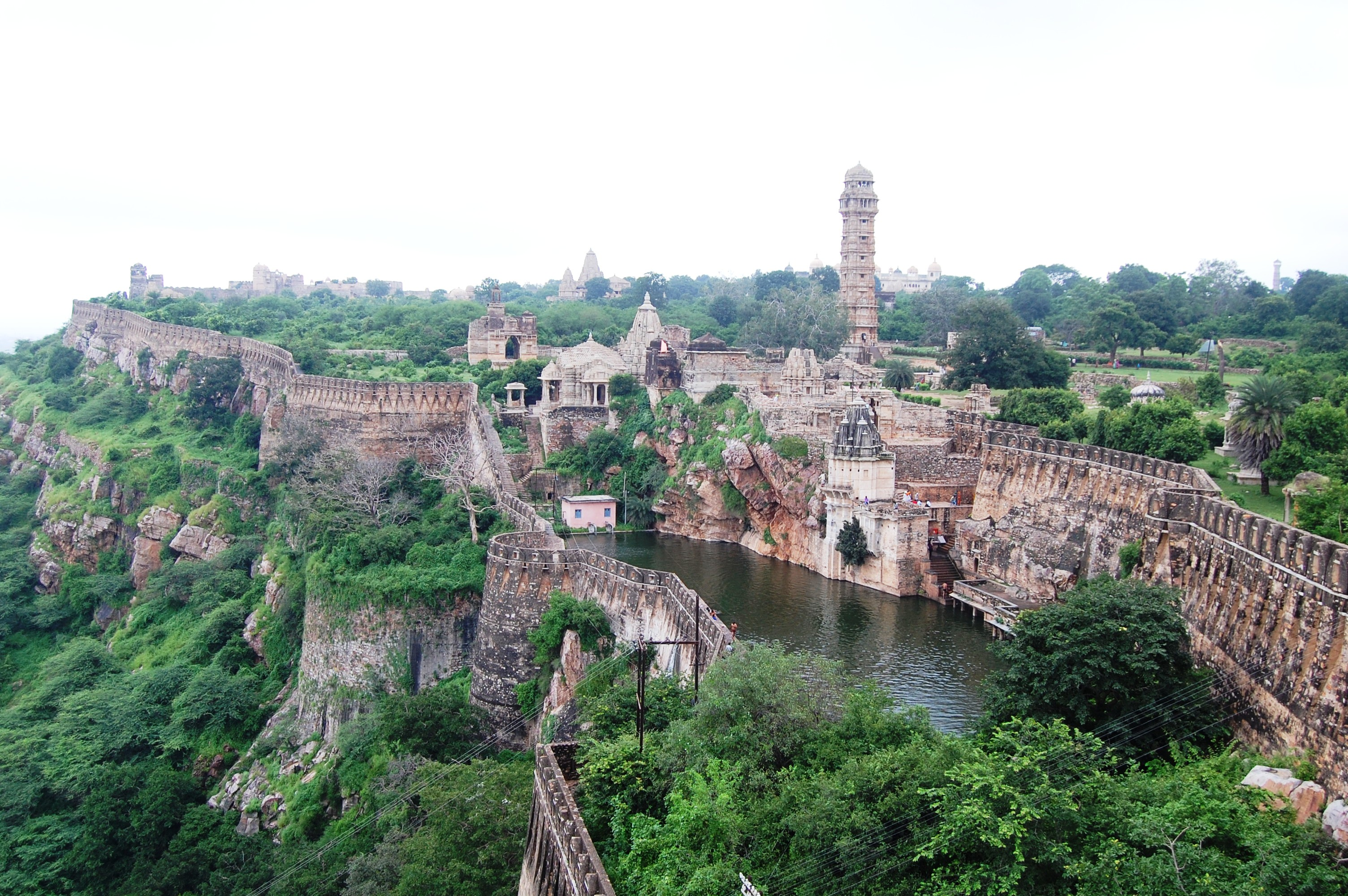
The Guhila dynasty ruled from Chittor Fort, which fell to the Delhi Sultanate in the Siege of Chittorgarh (1303), marking the end of the dynasty.

By the 13th century, having consolidated their rule over the Medapata (Mewar) region, the Guhilas came up with a new origin myth. Their post-13th century records and the subsequent bardic legends name the dynasty's founder as Bappa Rawal, who is not mentioned in the Atpur inscription. These accounts state that Bappa Rawal consolidated his rule with the blessings of the Pashupata sage Haritarashi. Different historians identify Bappa Rawal with different kings mentioned in the Atpur inscription, including Kalabhoja, Shiladitya, and Khummana. R. C. Majumdar theorizes that Bappa achieved a highly significant military success, because of which he gained reputation as the dynasty's founder.

According to the 1274 CE Chittor inscription and the 1285 CE Achaleshwar (Abu) inscription of Vedasharma, Bappa Rawal "changed his priestly splendour for regal lustre". Based on this, scholars such as D. R. Bhandarkar theorized that the Guhilas were originally Brahmins. G. H. Ojha, however, believed that the statement in Vedasharma's inscription is a misinterpretation of the earlier Atpur inscription. The Atpur inscription describes Guhadatta as a "Mahideva", which according to historian R. V. Somani, can be translated as either "king"" or "Brahman".

The 1274 CE Chittor inscription compares the Guhila ruler Bharttripatta with Rama, describing both of them as "Brahma-Kshatras". Based on the identification of Rama with Parashurama, scholars such as D. C. Sircar theorized that the progenitor of the dynasty had a Brahmin parent and a Kshatriya parent. However, Somani dismisses this theory, arguing that Rama here refers to Ramachandra, from whose Solar dynasty (or Suryavansh) the later Guhilas claimed descent.

The later bardic chronicles mention a fabricated genealogy, claiming that the dynasty's founder Guhaditya was a son of Shiladitya, the Maitraka ruler of Vallabhi. This claim is not supported by historical evidence.

== History ==
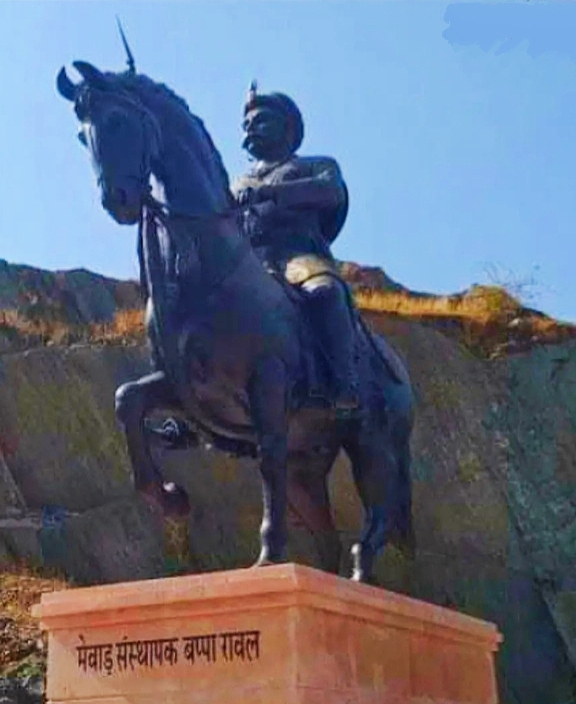
Statue of Bappa Rawal at Mewar (r.728 CE–763 CE).

R. C. Majumdar places Guhadatta in the 5th century CE, assuming a 20-year reign for each generation. R. V Somani places him somewhere before the first quarter of the 6th century.

According to the 977 CE Atpur inscription and the 1083 CE Kadmal inscription, Guhadatta was succeeded by Bhoja, who commissioned the construction of a tank at Eklingji. The 1285 CE Achaleshwar inscription describes him as a devotee of Vishnu. Bhoja was succeeded by Mahendra and Nagaditya. The bardic legends state that Nagaditya was killed in a battle with the Bhils.

Nagaditya's successor Shiladitya raised the political status of the family significantly, as suggested by his 646 CE Samoli inscription, as well as the inscriptions of his successors, including the 1274 CE Chittor inscription and the 1285 CE Abu inscription. R. V. Somani theorizes that the copper and zinc mines at Jawar were excavated during his reign, which greatly increased the economic prosperity of the kingdom. The 16th century Buddhist writer Taranatha mentions a reputed artist named Shringadhara, who was patronized by the king Shila of Maru country. Somani identifies this king as the Guhila king Shiladitya, although some other historians have identified him as Harshavardhana or the Maitraka king Shiladitya.

Shiladitya was succeeded by Aparajita, who is attested by the 661 CE Kunda inscription. This epigraph records the construction of a Vishnu temple by Yashomati, the wife of Aparajita's commander Varaha. According to the bardic chronicles, Aparajita was also killed in a battle with the Bhils. His son Mahendra succeeded him. Mahendra was succeeded by Kalabhoja, who has been identified as Bappa Rawal by several historians including G. H. Ojha.

The Guhilas originally acknowledged the suzerainty of the Gurjara-Pratiharas. In the 10th century, Bharttripatta II became an independent ruler, and assumed the title Maharajadhiraja, as attested by a 943 CE inscription. His successor Allata (reigned c. 950s CE) killed one Devapala, who according to Majumdar, might have been the Gurjara-Pratihara king Devapala.

Sahasra Bahu Temples in Nagda, Rajasthan, 10th century CE.

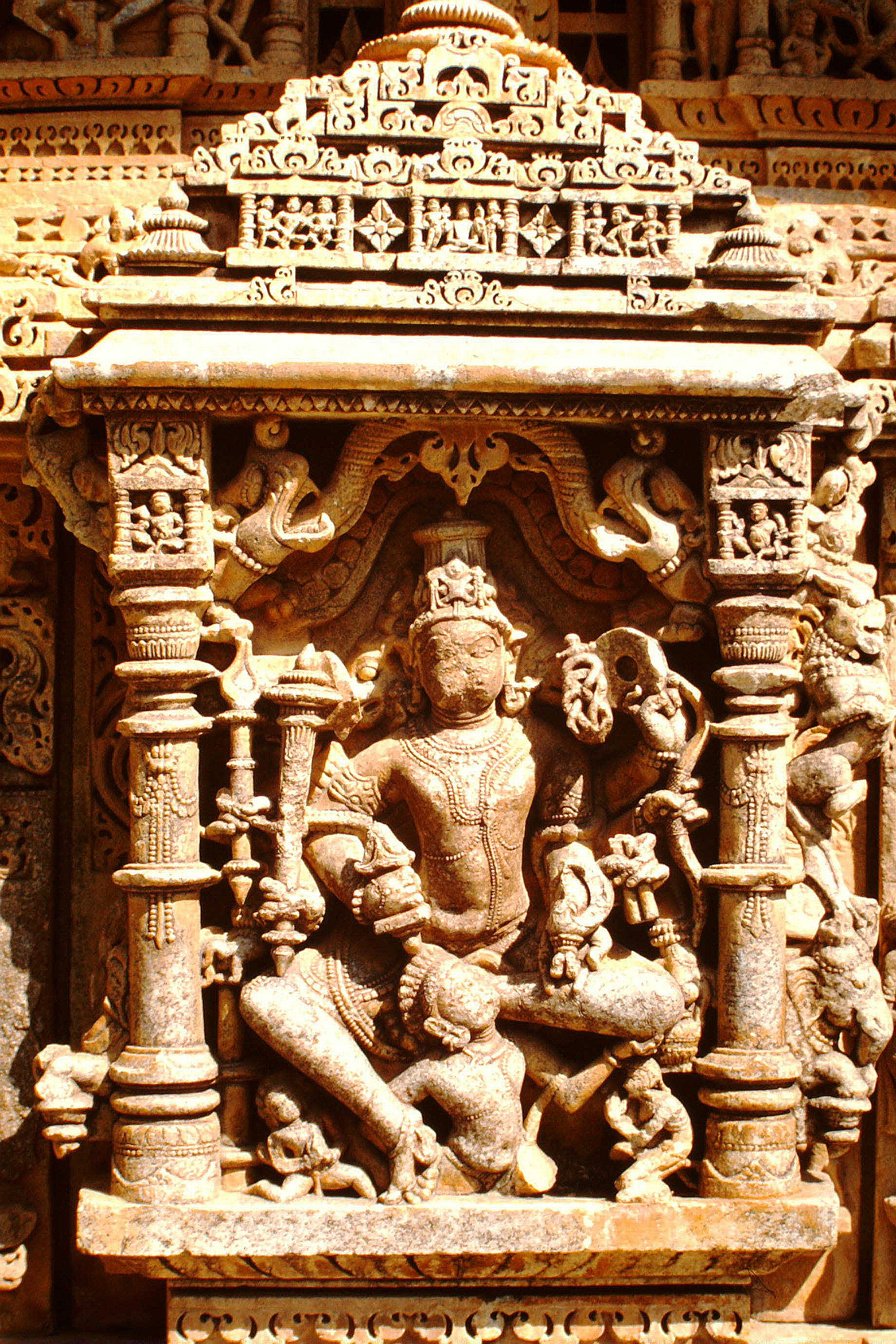
Sahasra Bahu Temples relief in Nagda, Rajasthan, 10th century CE.

=== Guhilas of Ahar ===
Towards the end of the 10th century, Ahar became the second capital of the Guhilas.

In the later half of the 10th century, the Paramara king Munja defeated the elephant forces of the Guhilas, and plundered their capital Ahar. The defeated Guhila ruler (either Naravahana or his son Shaktikumara) took shelter with Dhavala, the Rashtrakuta ruler of Hastikundi. As a result of this victory, the Paramaras gained control of the eastern part of Mewar, including Chittorgarh.

Shaktikumara's son Ambaprasada was defeated and killed by the Chahamana king Vakpati II. Among his successors, Vijayasimha (r.c. 1108–1116) was a son-in-law of the Paramara king Udayaditya and a father-in-law of the Kalachuri king Gayakarna.

=== Rawal branch ===
According to the 15th-century text Eklinga-Mahatmaya, the family split into two branches during the reign of Ranasimha alias Karna: the Rawal (senior) branch of Chittor, and the Rana (junior) branch of Sisoda. The later Sisodia Rajput dynasty of Sesoda thus descended from the Guhilas of Mewar.

Kshemasimha succeeded his father Ranasimha alias Karna. By 1151, Chittor was under the control of the Chaulukya king Kumarapala. Kshemasimha's son Samantasimha appears to have achieved military success against Kumarapala's successor Ajayapala. However, he was defeated by Ajayapala's feudatory Prahladana, the Paramara chief of Abu. The 1231 CE Abu prashasti inscription states that Prahladana defended the Gurjara king (that is, Ajayapala) after Samantasimha had broken the king's power on the battlefield.

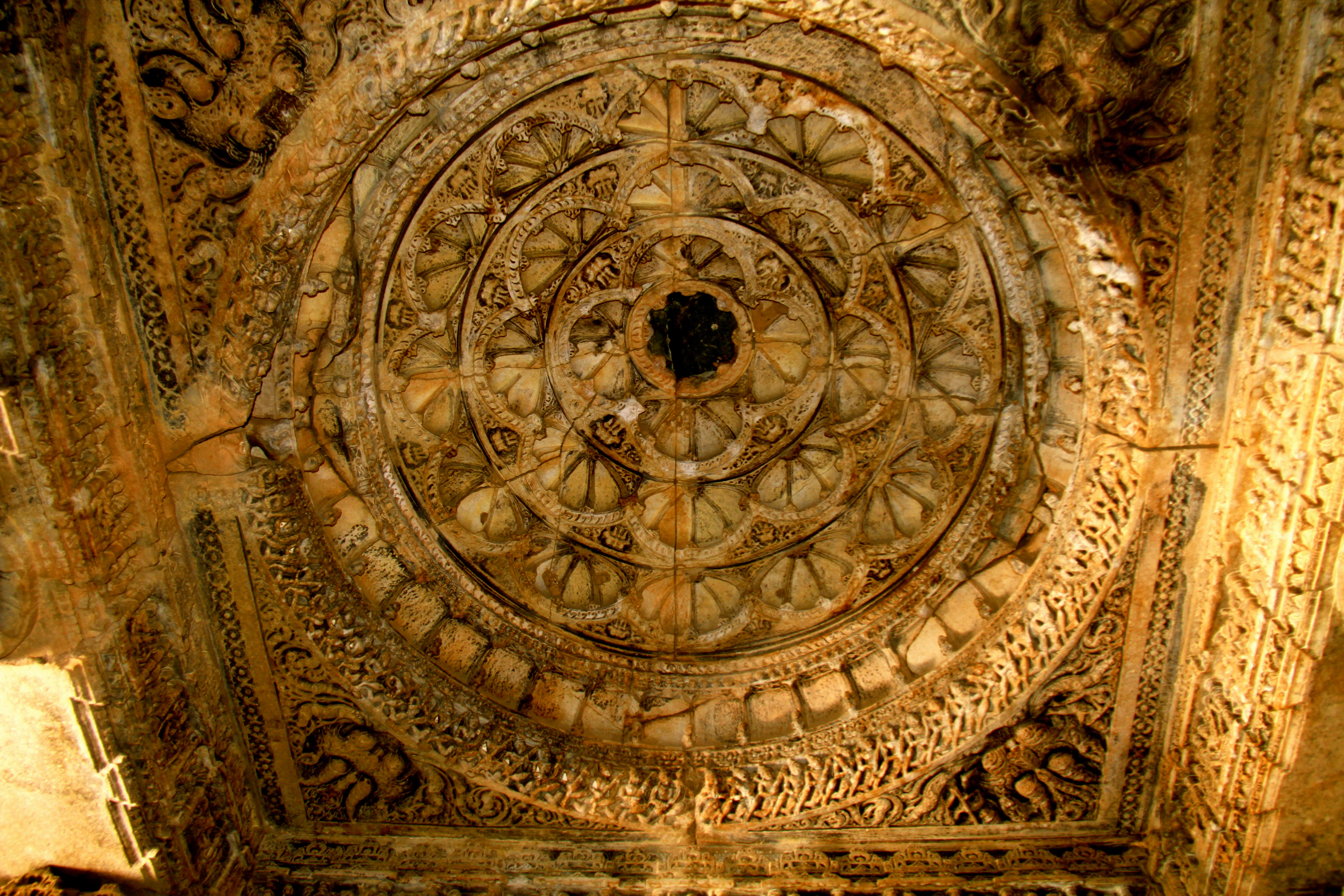
Roof carvings, Sahasra Bahu Temples in Nagda, Rajasthan, 10th century CE.

Shortly later, the Naddula Chahamana king Kirtipala, who was also a Chaulukya feudatory, ousted Samantasimha from Mewar. Kirtipala probably launched this invasion during 1171-1179 CE, with the approval of his Chaulukya overlord. By 1182, Samantasimha's younger brother Kumarasimha regained the control of his ancestral kingdom by appeasing the Chaulukya king Bhima II. After losing his ancestral realm, Samantasimha established new branch of the Guhilas in the area of Vagad. However, he was displaced from Vagad by Bhima II in 1185 CE or thereabouts. He was aided by Sambhar-Ajmer ruler Prithviraja III with whom he fought against the Ghurid conqueror Muhammad of Ghor in Second Battle of Tarain.

Kumarasimha was succeeded by Mathanasimha, Padmasimha and Jaitrasimha.

==== Jaitrasimha ====
During the reign of Jaitrasimha (r. c. 1213–1252), the Guhilas achieved a high political status. He fought with multiple rulers like Turushkas at Naddula which was possible held by Ghurid dynasty who captured it from Chauhans, Tribhuvana-Ranaka (identified with the Chaulukya king Tribhuvanapala) at Kottadaka, Iltutmish invaded Mewar, and destroyed Nagada. His relatives also possibly fought with Panchalagudika Jaitramalla.

The Guhila records also credit him with military success against the king of Shakambhari. The rulers of Shakambhari had already ended by this time, therefore, this may be a reference to the Chahamanas of Ranthambore. Jaitrasimha is also said to have defeated the Sindhuka army, whose identity is uncertain.

==== Decline ====
Jaitrasimha's son Tejasimha ascended the throne sometime before 1260. The earliest Guhila inscription discovered at Chittor is from Tejasimha's reign, and refers to "Chitrakuta-maha-durga" (the great fort of Chittor).

Tejasimha's son Samarasimha succeeded him sometime during 1267–1273. He defeated Krishnaraja, a ruler of the Paramara branch of Abu. He lost control of Abu soon, when Krishnaraja's son Pratapasimha, supported by the Vaghela king Sarangadeva, conquered it during 1285–1287. Sometime before 1285, Samarasimha helped Sarangadeva repulse a Turushka (Turkic) invasion of Gujarat (possibly a Delhi Sultanate army during Balban's reign). His Chirwa inscription states that he "like unto the primaeval boar [...] in a moment lifted the deeply sunk Gurjara land out of the Turushka sea". Towards the end of the 13th century, when Alauddin Khalji's army invaded Gujarat, Samarasimha saved his kingdom by paying a tribute.

The Rawal branch ended when Ratnasimha was defeated by Alauddin Khalji in the Siege of Chittorgarh (1303). The Rana branch survived in form of the Sisodia dynasty which continued to rule Mewar till Independence of India from British control.

== Genealogy ==
Different sources offer different lists of the Guhila kings. The earliest extant inscription that provides a genealogy of the dynasty is the 971 CE inscription of Naravahana. However, it is badly damaged, and only three names can be read: Guhila, Bappa and Naravahana.

The following inscriptions are the major sources of the dynasty's genealogy:

- Atpur (Ahar) inscription, 977 CE (1034 VS) of Śaktikumāra
- Chittor inscription, 1274 CE (1331 VS) of Samarasiṃha
- Abu (Achaleshvar) inscription, 1285 CE (1342 VS) of Samarasiṃha
- Sadadi (Ranpur) inscription, 1439 CE (1496 VS) of Kumbhakarna of Rana (Sisodia) branch
- Kumbhalgarh inscription, 1460 CE (1517 VS) of Kumbhakarna of Rana (Sisodia) branch

=== Early kings ===
The following table lists the early kings of the dynasty, as given in the various inscriptions.

#	Name (IAST)	Atpur inscription	Chittor inscription	Abu inscription	Sadadi inscription	Kumbhal-garh inscription	Date of own inscriptions	Notes
1	Bappa		✓	✓	✓	✓		Called Bappaka in Abu inscription
2	Guhila	✓	✓	✓	✓	✓		Called Guhadatta in Atpur inscription
3	Bhoja	✓	✓	✓	✓	✓		
4	Mahendra (I)	✓				✓		
5	Nāga	✓				✓		
6	Śila	✓	✓	✓	✓	?	646 CE (703 VS)	The Kumbhalgarh inscription lists Bappa instead
7	Aparājita	✓				✓	661 CE (718 VS)	
8	Mahendra (II)	✓				✓		
9	Kālabhoja	✓	✓	✓	✓	✓		
10	Khommāṇa (I)	✓				✓		Called Sh[Kh]ummāṇa in Kumbhalgarh inscription
11	Mattaṭa	✓	✓			✓		Called Manttaṭa in Chittor inscription
12	Bhartṛipaṭṭa (I)	✓	✓	✓	✓	✓		Called Bhartṛibhaṭa in all inscriptions except the Atpur one
13	Siṃha	✓	✓	✓	✓			Called Athasiṃha Chittor inscription
14	Khommāṇa (II)	✓						Son of Siṃha
15	Mahāyaka	✓	✓	✓	✓			Called Mahāyika in Abu inscription, Son of Khommāṇa
16	Khommāṇa (III)	✓	✓	✓	✓			Called Khumāṇa in all inscriptions except the Atpur one, Son of Mahāyaka
17	Bhartṛipaṭṭa (II)	✓					942 CE (999 VS), 943 CE (1000 VS)	Son of Khommāṇa (III), Married Mahālakṣmī of Rashtrakuta family
18	Allaṭa	✓	✓	✓	✓	✓	951 CE (1008 VS), 953 CE (1010 VS)	Son of Bhartṛipaṭṭa (II), Married Huna princess Hariyādevī
19	Naravāhana	✓	✓	✓	✓	✓	971 CE (1028 VS)	Son of Allaṭa, Married a daughter of Jejaya of Chahamana family. Held religious debates in court between Buddhists, Jains and Shaivite Hindus.
20	Śalivāhana	✓				✓		Son of Naravāhana
21	Śaktikumāra	✓	✓	✓	✓	✓	977 CE (1034 VS)	Son of Śalivāhana
22	Āmraprasāda		✓			✓	993 CE (1050 VS)	Called Ambāprasāda in Kumbhalgarh inscription, Son of Śaktikumāra. Slain by Chauhan Vakpatiraja II in Battle.
23	Śuchivarman		✓	✓	✓	?		The Kumbhalgarh inscription lists Anantavarman (a son of Śaktikumāra) instead
24	Naravarman		✓	✓		✓		Son of Śaktikumāra
25	Kīrtivarman			✓	✓	?		The Kumbhalgarh inscription lists Yaśovarman (a son of Śaktikumāra) instead
26	Yogarāja				✓	✓		According to Kumbhalgarh inscription, his descendants did not rule. Possibly deposed by Bhoja of Paramars.
27	Vairaṭa			✓	✓	✓		Descendant of Junior branch from Allata. Possibly placed on throne by Bhoja.
28	Vaṃśapāla				✓	✓		Called Haṃsapāla in Kumbhalgarh inscription
29	Vairisiṃha			✓	✓	✓		Son of Vaṃśapāla
30	Vijayasiṃha			✓			1164 VS, 1173 VS	Son of Vairaṭa. Married Śyāmaladevī (daughter of Paramara king Udayaditya) forming a matrimonial alliance with the traditional enemy of the house; His daughter Alhaṇadevi married the Kalachuri king Gayakarna. The Kumbhalgarh inscription mentions an unnamed narendra (prince), who is identified with him.
31	Vairisiṃha (II)				✓	✓		Son of Vijayasiṃha. Called Virasiṃha in Kumbhalgarh inscription
32	Arisiṃha			✓	✓			
33	Choḍa			✓	✓	✓		Called Choḍasiṃha in Sadadi inscription
34	Vikramasiṃha			✓	✓	✓		Son of Choḍa (Abu insc.) or Elder brother of Choḍa (Kumbhalgarh insc.)
35	Raṇasiṃha				✓	✓	1223 VS	Son of Vikramasiṃha. Called Karṇasiṃha in Ekalinga Purana. Rana Branch descends through his son Rahapa.

=== Post-split Rawal branch ===
After Raṇasiṃha, the dynasty split into the Rawal branch and the Rana branch. The following is a list of the rulers of the Rawal branch. Except Ratnasiṃha, all these rulers are mentioned in Abu, Sadadi, and Kumbhalgarh inscriptions. Ratnasiṃha is mentioned only in the Kumbhalgarh inscription.

#	Name (IAST)	Date of own inscriptions	Notes
36	Kṣemasiṃha	1228 VS, 1236 VS, 1256 VS, 1258 VS	Son of Raṇasiṃha; his elder brother Mahanasiṃha apparently died before their father Raṇasiṃha
37	Sāmantasiṃha		Son of Kṣemasiṃha
38	Kumārasiṃha		Younger brother of Sāmantasiṃha
39	Mathanasiṃha		Called Mahanasiṃha in Kumbhalgarh inscription, Son of Kumārasiṃha
40	Padmasiṃha		
41	Jaitrasiṃha	1270 VS, 1279 VS, 1284 VS	Called Raula Jayasiṃha in Kumbhalgarh inscription. Son of Padmasiṃha. His younger son Sīlhaḍa seems to have ruled Vāgaḍa.
42	Tejasiṃha	1317 VS, 1322 VS, 1324 VS	Son of Jaitrasiṃha. The Kumbhalgarh inscription gives his title as Rāula. Married Jayatalladevī
43	Samarasiṃha	1330 VS, 1331 VS, 1335 VS, 1342 VS, 1344 VS, 1345 VS, 1356 VS, 1358 VS	Son of Tejasiṃha. Assumed the title Mahārajākula. The Kumbhalgarh inscription gives his title as Rāula.
44	Ratnasiṃha	1359 VS	Son of Samarasiṃha. Assumed the title Mahārajākula in Dariba inscription. The Kumbhalgarh inscription gives his title as Rāula.

The 1439 Sadadi inscription of Kumbhakarna lists the following five rulers as Samarasiṃha's successors: Bhuvanasiṃha, Jayasiṃha, Lakṣmasiṃha, Ajayasiṃha, and Arisiṃha. These names are followed by that of Hammīra and other his Sisodia successors. These names are also mentioned in the text Ekalinga Māhātmya (also called Ekalinga Purāṇa). However, these rulers actually belonged to the Rana branch of the family.

The 1460 Kumbhalgarh inscription of Kumbhakarna states that after Ratnasiṃha departed from the battlefield (during the 1303 Siege of Chittor), Lakshmasiṃha of the Rana branch died fighting to defend the fort.

=== Rana branch ===
Guhila headquarters at various times

Rahapa, a son of Ranasimha alias Karna, established the Rana branch. According to the 1652 Eklingji inscription, Rahapa's successors were:

- Narapati
- Dinakara
- Jasakarna
- Nagapala
- Karnapala
- Bhuvanasimha
- Bhimasimha
- Jayasimha
- Lakhanasimha
- Arisimha (Arasi)
- Hammira (Hammir Singh)

Hammir Singh re-established the family's rule over Mewar under the title of Rana.

For Sisodia successors of Hammir Singh, see Ranas of Mewar.
