= Bappa Rawal =

Rawal of Mewar from 728 to 763

- Rawal of Mewar; Purana Purusha
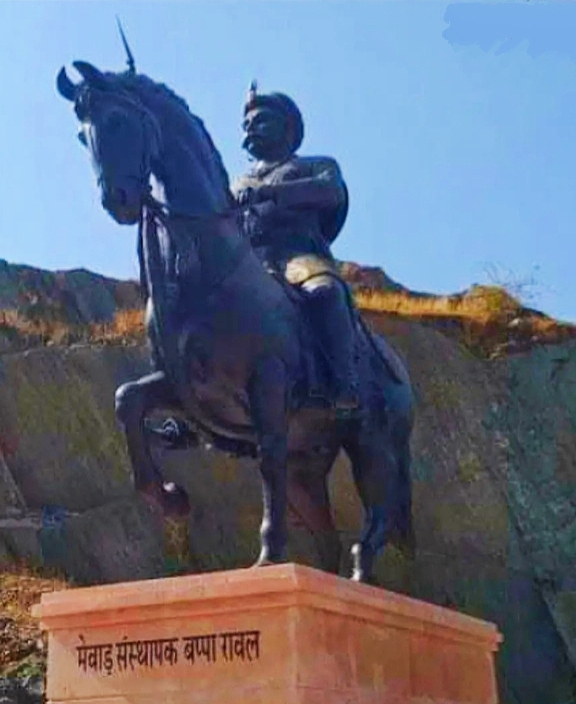
- Statue of Bappa Rawal at Mewar

Ruler of Mewar
- Reign: 728 CE–764 CE
- Predecessor: Chitrangada Mori
- Successor: Khumana I
- Dynasty: Guhila dynasty
- Religion: Shaivite Hinduism

Bappa Rawal, also known as Kālabhoja, was the ruler of the Guhila Rajput dynasty in the Kingdom of Mewar. While the early Guhila chiefs are mentioned in inscriptions, Bappa Rawal is identified as the first major ruler of Mewar region in the later chronicles and bardic traditions. He is credited in the chronicles with repelling the Arab invasions in north-western India.

== Literary accounts ==
According to the 15th-century text Ekalinga Mahatmya (also called Ekalinga Purana), Bappa was the ninth descendant of the Guhila dynasty's founder Guhadatta. The text credits him with establishing the Mewar Kingdom in 728 CE, and with building the Eklingji temple.

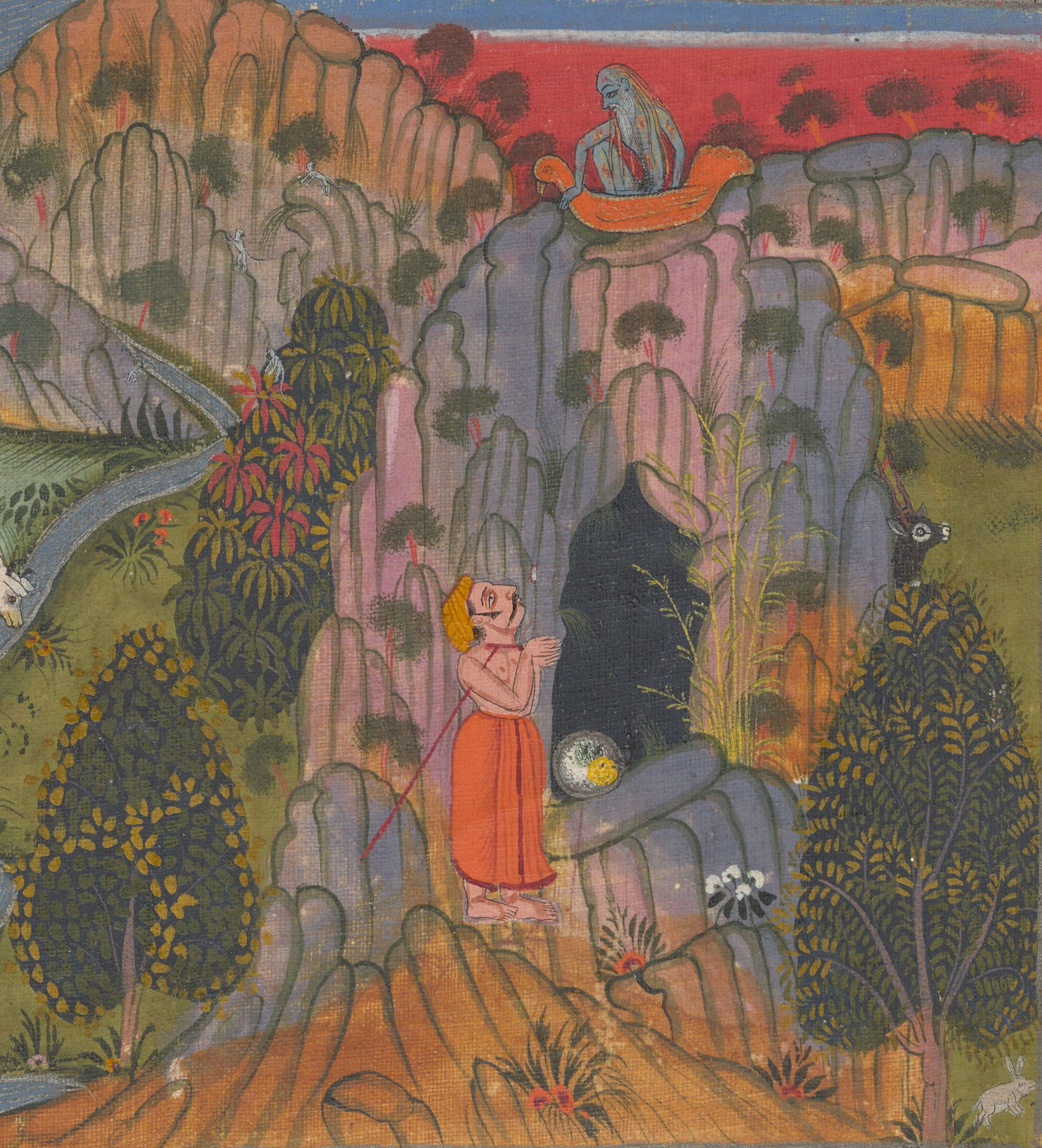
Bappa Rawal stands before Harit Rishi, detail of a genealogical scroll of the rulers of Mewar, Udaipur, ca.1730–40

The Ekalinga Mahatmya and other bardic chronicles state that Bappa's father Nagaditya and all other male members of his family were killed in a battle with the Bhils of Idar. He remained in disguise, accompanied by his two loyal Bhil attendants. He was brought up by a Brahmin lady of Nagda, who employed him as a caretaker of cows. One day, he met the sage Harit Rashi.

According to traditional chronicles, Harit Rashi initiated Bappa into the Shaivite order and instructed him to build the renowned Eklingji Temple at Nagda. Upon completing his Tapasya, spiritual training, as directed by the sage, Bappa defeated his father's killers and firmly established the Mewar Kingdom. This initiation established the foundational political and spiritual theology of the Mewar state: the Guhila rulers did not claim absolute sovereignty, but rather ruled strictly as Diwans (custodians or prime ministers) on behalf of the family deity, Lord Eklingnath ji. While indigenous histories record this as a foundational historical-spiritual event, some secular Indologists view it through the lens of comparative literary tropes; for example, David Gordon White compares the accounts to similar narratives involving the sage Gorakhnath, the Gorkha king Prithvi Narayan Shah, the alchemist Vyadi and the king Vikramaditya.

== Historicity ==
=== Period ===
The exact period of Bappa Rawal is not certain. According to the Ekalinga Mahatmya, Bappa Rawal established the Mewar Kingdom in 728 CE, and abdicated the throne in 753 CE/764 CE. D. R. Bhandarkar and G. H. Ojha believed this to be an authentic date.

=== Identification ===
The word "Bappa" means "father", and Rawal is a royal title. Therefore, scholars such as C. V. Vaidya, D. R. Bhandarkar, G. H. Ojha, and Kaviraj Shyamaldas believe that "Bappa Rawal" is not a proper noun.

Bappa Rawal is mentioned in some inscriptions that provide genealogical lists of the Guhila dynasty, but other inscriptions containing such lists do not mention him. For example, he is mentioned in the 959 CE Unawas inscription and the 971 CE Ekling inscription. However, the 977 CE Atpur inscription and the 1083 CE Kadmal inscription do not mention him. Therefore, historians have assumed that "Bappa Rawal" is an epithet for one of the Guhila rulers, and different scholars have tried to identify him with different Guhila kings.

According to the Atpur and Kadmal inscriptions, the Guhila ruler Mahendra was succeeded by Kalabhoja. Several historians, such as G. H. Ojha, have identified Bappa Rawal as Kalabhoja, because the 977 CE Atpur inscription mentions Khumana as a son of Kalabhoja, and the 1404 CE Uparaganva (Dungarpur) inscription of Maharawal Pata names Khumana as the son of Bappa Rawal. R. V. Somani endorses this identification, but cautions that the evidence is not conclusive: Bappa Rawal may have been a different ruler who belonged to another branch of the Guhilas.

The Atpur inscription names Śila as the successor of Nāga, and predecessor of Aparājita. The 1460 CE Kumbhalgarh inscription names Bappa as the successor of Nāga, and predecessor of Aparājita. This suggests that Bappa Rawal was another name for Shiladitya (Śila), the great-grandfather of Kalabhoja. Based on this evidence, Dasharatha Sharma and D. C. Sircar have identified Bappa Rawal with Shiladitya. However, R. V. Somani disputes this identification, arguing that this inscription contains several errors, including naming Bappa Rawal as the father of Guhadatta (who was the dynasty's founder according to some other inscriptions).

Some other historians, such as D. R. Bhandarkar, identified Bappa Rawal with Kalabhoja's son Khumana, based on the calculation of average reign of the Guhila rulers.

== Military career ==
=== Siege of Chittor ===
According to some ancient records, Bappa Rawal captured famous Chitrakuta (Chittor Fort) from the mlechchhas. Scholars such as R. C. Majumdar and R. V. Somani write on the basis of available records that the Arab invaders defeated the former rulers of Chittor, and Bappa Rawal gained control of Chittor after repulsing the Arab invaders. According to Majumdar, the Moris (Mauryas) were ruling at Chittor when the Arabs (mlechchhas) invaded north-western India around 725 CE. The Arabs defeated the Moris, and in turn, were defeated by a confederacy that included Bappa Rawal. Majumdar believes that his heroics against the Arabs raised Bappa Rawal's status to such an extent that he wrongly came to be regarded as the founder of the dynasty. R. V. Somani writes in his book that Bappa was a part of the anti-Arab confederacy formed by the Gurjara-Pratihara ruler Nagabhata I.

Shyam Manohar Mishra of Lucknow University theorized that Bappa Rawal was originally a vassal of the Mori ruler Manuraja (Maan Maurya). He probably led the Mori campaign against the Arabs, which made him more famous than his overlord. Later, he either deposed Manuraja (Maan Maurya), or became the king after Manuraja died childless.

After his successful campaigns against Arabs, several conflicts occurred in India most famously between the Pratiharas and Rashtrakutas. The Rashtrakuta king Dantidurga occupied Ujjain and performed the Hiranyagarbha ceremony there, however in short time, Rashtrakutas left and Nagabhata regained his power. Historian R.V. Somani theorizes that in these conflicts, Bappa Rawal also faced Dantidurga's armies by helping Pratiharas in their struggle, and thus succeeded in capturing the eastern parts of Mewar region; he also contested with Karanatakas and the Cholas as described in the inscription of Chittor.

== Gold coins ==
Multiple gold coins bearing the Nagari legend "Shri Voppa" or "Shri Vopparaja" have been widely attributed to Bappa Rawal by prominent historians such as G. H. Ojha. Proponents of this attribution note that Bappa Rawal's successful leadership in the confederacy against the Arab invasions brought significant wealth and territorial influence to Mewar, making the issuance of gold currency a logical marker of his newly elevated sovereign status. However, this identification has been disputed by some numismatists; for instance, a 1960 journal of the Numismatic Society of India argued that Mewar was not a sufficiently large empire at the time to issue gold coins, alternatively suggesting they might belong to King Vappuka of the Surasena dynasty, who is mentioned in a 955 CE (1012 VS) inscription from Bayana. Nevertheless, the coins feature distinctly Shaivite iconography, such as a trishula (trident), a linga, and a bull, which strongly aligns with Bappa Rawal's well-documented devotion to Lord Eklingnath ji and his initiation by Harit Rashi.

On one such coin, below these Shaivite symbols, is the image of a man in a prostrate position. The man has features with large pierced ears, and the holes are exaggerated. According to Indologist David Gordon White, this may be a representation of Bappa's initiation into a Shaivite sect, as ear piercing has been associated with the Nath Siddhas (a Shaivite sect), who were custodians of the Eklingji shrine before the 16th century. White, however, believes that Bappa is more likely to have been initiated into the Pashupata sect. Pashupata names commonly ended in Rashi (IAST: Rāśi), and thus, Harit Rishi was likely a Pashupata sage. Moreover, "Rawal" (from Sanskrit rāja-kula, "royal lineage") was the name of a clan among the Pashupatas in the 8th century: in the 13th century, this clan was absorbed into the Nath sect.

One gold coin features a haloed Rama holding bow and arrow, with a bull to his left, and an elephant to his right. The other side of the coin features an enthroned ruler with attendants on his sides, with the legend "Shri Voppa" below.

Another gold coin features the legend "Shri Vopparaja", with the images of a bull, a trident, a linga, and an attendant. The other side features a cow with a suckling calf.

== Monuments ==
- Shri Bappa Rawal Temple is dedicated to Bappa Rawal is in Mathatha, Rajasthan located close to the Eklingji temple, 24 kilometres north of Udaipur.

== In popular culture ==
The 1925 Indian silent Mewadpati Bappa Rawal portrayed Rawal's life on screen.

== Bibliography ==
- Arthur L. Friedberg; Ira S. Friedberg (2017). Gold Coins of the World (9th ed.). Coin & Currency Institute. ISBN 978-0-87184-009-7.
- David Gordon White (2012). The Alchemical Body: Siddha Traditions in Medieval India. University of Chicago Press. p. 119. ISBN 978-0-226-14934-9.
- Khalid Yahya Blankinship (1994). The End of the Jihad State: The Reign of Hisham Ibn 'Abd al-Malik and the Collapse of the Umayyads. SUNY Press. p. 188. ISBN 978-0-7914-1827-7.
- N. P. Chakravarti (1987) [1958]. "Appendix: Rajaprasasti Inscription of Udaipur (Continued from Vol. XXIX, Part V)". In N. Lakshminarayan Rao; D. C. Sircar (eds.). Epigraphia Indica. Vol. XXX. Archaeological Survey of India.
- Ram Vallabh Somani (1976). History of Mewar, from Earliest Times to 1751 A.D. Mateshwari. OCLC 2929852.
- R. C. Majumdar (1977). Ancient India. Motilal Banarsidass. ISBN 978-81-208-0436-4.
- Shyam Manohar Mishra (1977). Yaśovarman of Kanauj. Abhinav. OCLC 557679616.
- S.B. Bhattacherje (1922). Encyclopaedia of Indian events and dates. New Delhi: Sterling Publishers.
