= Rawal Bharttripatta II =

Rawal of Mewar from 942 to 951

Bhartripatta
- Rawal; Maharajadhiraja

Rawal of Mewar
- Reign: 942–951
- Predecessor: Khuman III
- Successor: Rawal Allata
- Spouse: Mahalaxmi (born Rashtrakuta)

Rawal Bharttripatta II or Rawal Bhartribhatta II (Bhartṛipaṭṭa) was a ruler of the Guhila dynasty in the Udaipur region of Rajputana in India in the first half of the 10th century. He became the Rawal in 942/43 after his father Khuman III and was succeeded by his son Allata in 951.

He is described as an ambitious ruler by R. Somani. He married Mahālakṣmī, a Rashtrakuta princess to establish an alliance with the Rastrakutas and also strike a hostility with the Gurjara-Pratihara who had been the allies of the Guhilots for centuries but were now in a state of decline. Another evidence of hostility with the Pratihara is the fact that Pratapgarh inscriptions of 999VS (942 CE) describe him as the Maharajadhiraja and intentionally omitted the name of the Pratihara King Mahendrapala.

== Bibliography ==
- Somani, Ram Vallabh (1976). History of Mewar, from Earliest Times to 1751 A.D. Mateshwari. OCLC 2929852.
