= Ajayapala =

Ajayapala may refer to:

- Ajayapala (Chaulukya dynasty) (r. c. 1171 – 1175 CE), king who ruled in present-day Gujarat, India
- Ajayaraja I (r. c. 721-734 CE), Chahamana dynasty king who ruled in present-day Rajasthan, India; also known as Ajayapala Chakri
