= Rawal Allata =

Rawal of Mewar from 951 to 971

Allata
- Rawal

Rawal of Mewar
- Reign: 951–971
- Predecessor: Bharttripatta II
- Successor: Naravahana
- Died: 971
- Spouse: Hariyadevi
- Issue: Naravahana (among others)
- Dynasty: Guhila
- Father: Bharttripatta II
- Mother: Mahalakshmi
- Religion: Hinduism

Rawal Allata (Rāwal Allaṭa) or Allata was a ruler of the Guhila dynasty. He was the son and successor of Rawal Bharttripatta II. He ruled from 951 to 971 CE. He continued the struggle with the Pratihara dynasty and is known to have slain the Pratihara King Devapal in 954. He was able to consolidate power after the weakening of the Imperial Pratiharas. This hostility with the Pratiharas and the devastation of the empire eventually caused the empire to break into smaller dynasties like Paramaras of Malwa and Chauhans of Ajmer and Chaulukyas of Gujarat.

He made matrimonial alliances with the Huns by marrying a Huna princess Hariyadevi. According to R. Somāni, his reign was fairly prosperous and glorious. After defeating the Gurjara king, Allata shifted his capital to the town of Ahar which he converted into a commercial center and also constructed a lot of temples.

== Bibliography ==
- Ram Vallabh Somani (1976). History of Mewar, from Earliest Times to 1751 A.D. Mateshwari. OCLC 2929852.
