= Nagda, Rajasthan =

Coordinates: 23.4564°N 75.4131°E

Nagda Nag-dah
- Historical Place
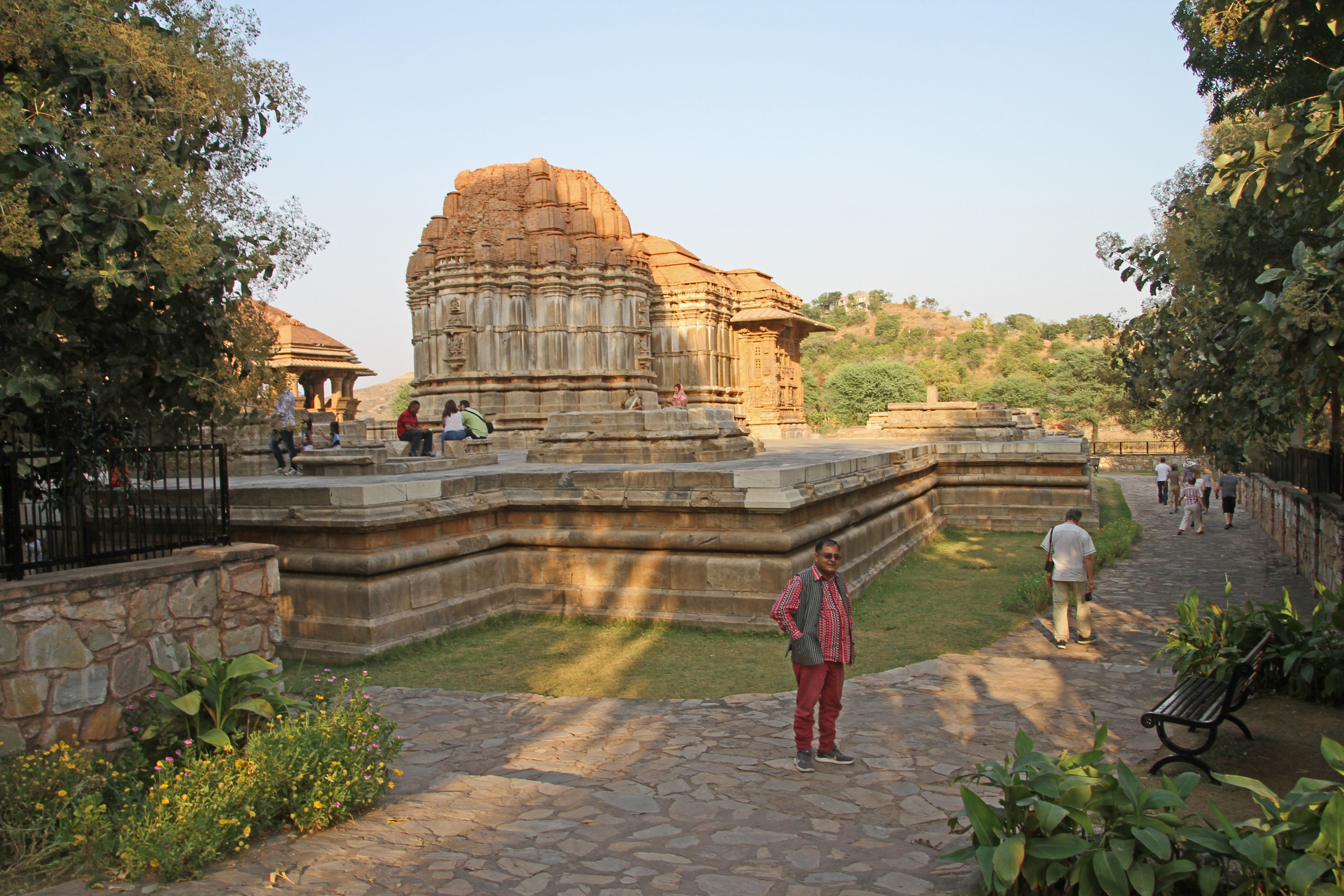
- Country: India
- State: Rajasthan
- District: Udaipur District
- Established: 7th century AD
- Founder: King Nagaditya

Nagda is a village in Udaipur district of Rajasthan state in India. It was once a prominent city in the early Mewar state. Today it is known primarily for the remains of the Sahasra Bahu Temples.

== Location ==
Nagda is situated approximately 20 kilometers north of Udaipur or 2.5 km away from Eklingji, another sacred area.

== History ==
Nagda was probably established by King Nagaditya of the Guhil dynasty in the 7th century AD and it was known as Nagahrada then. Nagda was the first capital of Mewar and continued to be so until c. 948 when the capital was shifted to Ahar. In c.1116, Nagda again became the capital of Mewar and stayed so until the early part of the 13th century when it was sacked by Sultan Iltutmish's forces.

== Population ==
The population of Nagda is 237.
