= Ahar, Rajasthan =

Ahar
- Former town
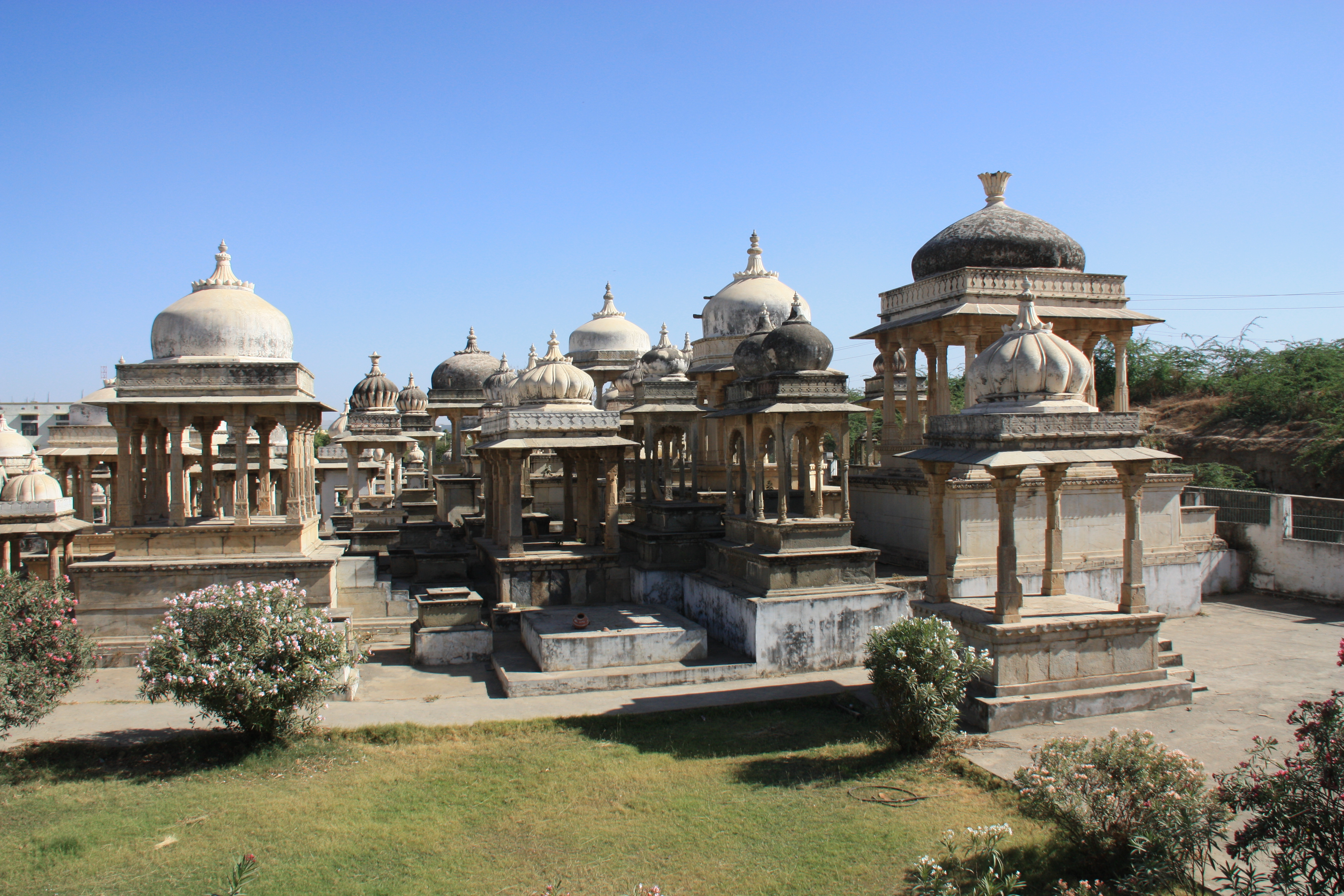
- Ahar Cenotaphs, memorials to past rulers of Mewar in Ahar

- Location in Rajasthan Location within India
- Coordinates: 24.587258°N 73.721550°E
- Country: India
- State: Rajasthan
- District: Udaipur district

Ahar is a former town of historical significance, located on the north bank of the Ahar River in the present-day city of Udaipur, Rajasthan, in India.

== History ==
Archeological excavations in the late 1950s and early 1960s revealed that Ahar was the site of the Chalcolithic Ahar culture. Two distinct cultures have been identified at the Ahar archeological site - Ahar Period I (2580 BC to 1500 BC) and Ahar Period II (1000 BC onwards).

In the pre-modern era, Ahar was a politically significant town after it became the capital of the Guhil rulers of Mewar in c.948 and stayed so until c.1116 when the capital moved to Nagda. Its other historical names are Aghatapura and Atpura.

Ahar (Āghāṭapura) seems to have been one of the most important commercial centres in early medieval Rajasthan. Contemporary records, including ones from 953 and 1278, indicate the presence of multiple merchant groups: local resident vaṇiks, an organisation of deśīs (itinerent merchants), and merchants from farther-away regions like Karṇāṭa, Madhya-viṣaya, Lāṭa, and Ṭakka. This last group (merchants from outside Rajasthan) probably moved from one commercial centre to the next in periodic cycles as part of well-organised caravans. The merchandise all these various traders dealt in included (based on the 953 source) unspecified agricultural produce, oil, confectionery, and expensive animals like horses and elephants. There seems to have been more than one marketplace at Ahar. In addition, while no other prominent commercial centres are known to have existed in the Ahar area during this time, a comparison with other important centres like Arthuna indicates that there was likely a cluster of smaller commercial settlements around Ahar.

== See also ==
- Ahar Cenotaphs
