= Jaitrasimha =

- Maharajadhiraja; Rawal

Rawal of the Guhila dynasty
- Reign: 1213-1253
- Predecessor: Padmasimha
- Successor: Tejasimha
- Died: 1252
- House: Guhila
- Military career
- Conflicts: Battle of Bhutala

Rawal Jaitrasimha also known as Rawal Jaitra Singh was the ruler of the Guhila dynasty from 1213 to 1252. During his rule, the Guhila Kingdom attained a high political status. Ekalinga Mahatmya mentions his title as Rajakula (Rawal), his own inscriptions call him a Maharajadhiraja ("king of great kings").

During his rule, literary works like Hamir Mada Mardan are found which state that Jaitrasimha was confident in his sword. According to Ram Vallabh Somani, Many other indicators suggest that the Guhila Kingdom at this stage was an independent entity.

== Struggles with the Ghurids and Iltutmish ==
The Achaleshvara inscription suggests that Jaitrasimha destroyed Naddula and defeated the Turushkas (Turkic people). According to historian R. B. Singh, this suggests that the Turkic Ghurid invaders had captured Naddula from the Chauhans (Chahamanas), and Jaitrasimha defeated their local governor. Later, the Jalor Chauhan king Udayasimha (a relative of Jayatasimha), gained control of Naddula. However, D. C. Ganguly believes that Jaitrasimha may have plundered Naddula after Udayasimha's conquest of Jalore.

Early in his reign, the Delhi Sultanate ruler Iltutmish invaded Mewar, and destroyed Nagada(the then capital of Mewar). Jaitrasimha Guhila (alias Jayatala) suffered heavy losses and retreated, but the Sultanate army retreated when the Vaghela chief Viradhavala (a feudatory of Solankis of Gujarat) marched northwards to check their advance and counter them.

Jaitrasimha seems to have invaded the Chaulukya territory. During an attempt to capture Kottadaka (modern Kotada), the general of the Mewar army Bala was killed by Tribhuvana-Ranaka (identified with the Solanki king Tribhuvanapala).

According to one record, Ksehma's son Madana fought with the Panchalagudika Jaitramalla at Utthunaka (modern Arthuna), on behalf of Jesala. Based on identification of Jesala with Jaitrasimha, historian D. C. Ganguly believes that Jaitrasimha's general Madana fought with Jaitramalla, who was probably a chief of the Vagada branch of the Guhilas.

The Guhila records also credit Jaitrasimha with military success against the king of Shakambhari. The Chauhan dynasty of Shakambhari had already ended by this time, therefore, this may be a reference to his victory over their descendants, the Chauhans of Ranthambore. Jaitrasimha is also said to have defeated the Sindhuka army, whose identity is uncertain.

== Bibliography ==
- Kalyan Kumar Ganguli (1983). Cultural History Of Rajasthan. Sundeep Prakashan. OCLC 461886025.
- Asoke Kumar Majumdar (1956). Chaulukyas of Gujarat. Bharatiya Vidya Bhavan. OCLC 4413150.
- R. B. Singh (1964). History of the Chāhamānas. N. Kishore. OCLC 11038728.
- Ram Vallabh Somani (1976). History of Mewar, from Earliest Times to 1751 A.D. Mateshwari. OCLC 2929852.
