= Kuldhara =

Village in Jaisalmer (Rajasthan), India

Kuldhara Kuldhar
- Village
- Ghost town
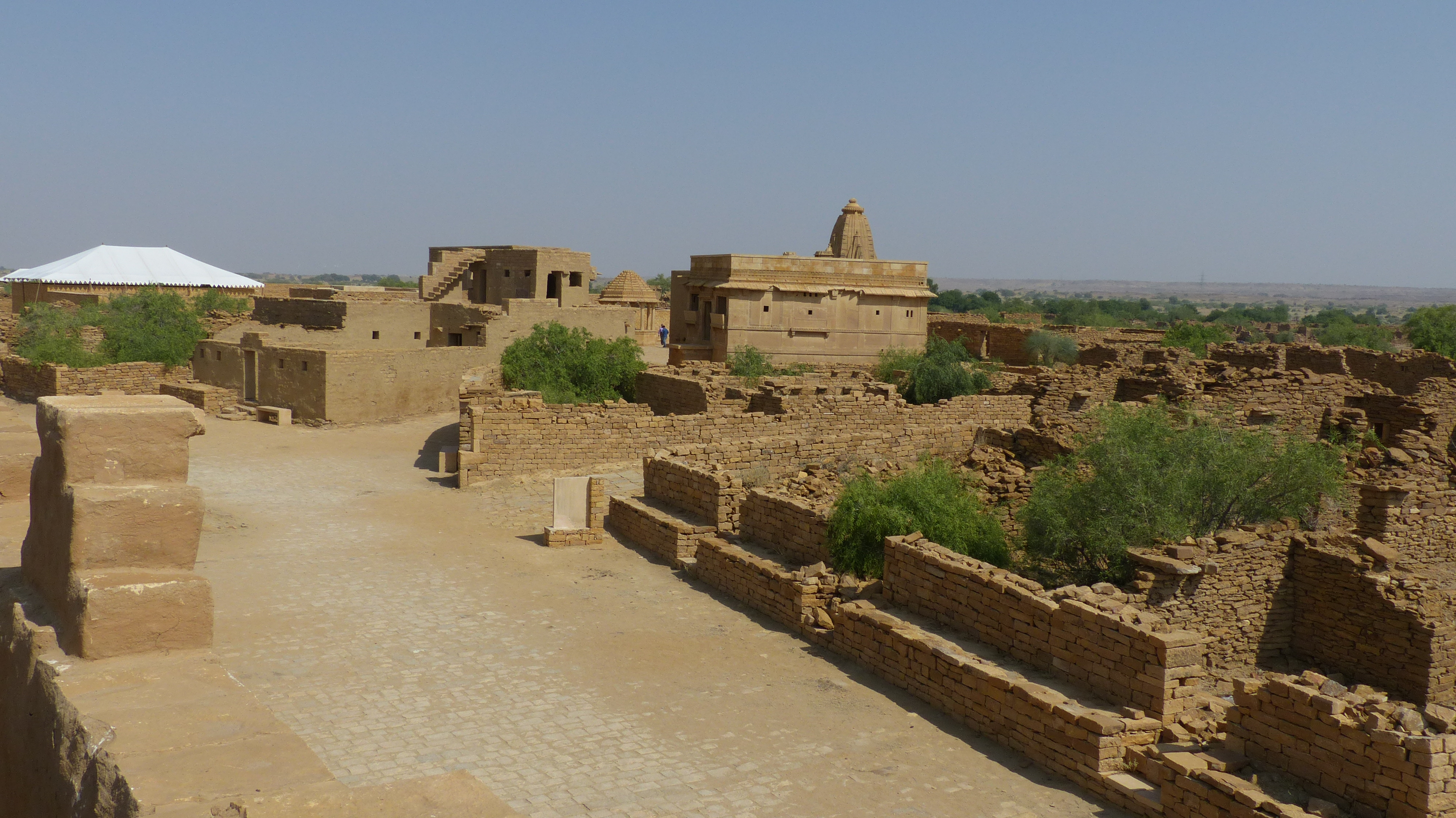
- Ruins of Kuldhara houses

- Location of Kuldhara in Rajasthan, India Kuldhara (India)
- Coordinates: 26°52′12″N 70°47′06″E
- Country: India
- State: Rajasthan
- District: Jaisalmer
- Elevation: 266 m (873 ft)
- Time zone: UTC+5:30 (IST)

Kuldhara is an abandoned village in the Jaisalmer district of Rajasthan, India. Established around the 13th century, it was once a prosperous village inhabited by Paliwal Brahmins. It was abandoned by the early 19th century for unknown reasons, possibly because of dwindling water supply, an earthquake, or because of some supernatural elements as per local legends.

Over the years, Kuldhara has acquired a reputation as a haunted site, and the Government of Rajasthan decided to develop it as a tourist spot in the 2010s.

== Geography ==
The former village site is located about 18 km south-west of the Jaisalmer city. The village was located behind Murari House and Colline House, an 861 m x 261 m rectangular site aligned in the north–south direction. The township was centred around a temple of the mother goddess. It had three longitudinal roads, which were cut through by a number of latitudinal narrow lanes.

The remains of a city wall can be seen on the north and the south sides of the site. The eastern side of the town faces the dry-river bed of the small Kakni river. The western side was protected by the back-walls of man-made structures.

== Establishment ==
The Kuldhara village was originally settled by Brahmins who had migrated from Pali to Jaisalmer region. These migrants originating from Pali were called Paliwals. Tawarikh-i-Jaisalmer, an 1899 history book written by Lakshmi Chand, states that a Paliwal Brahmin named Kadhan was the first person to settle in the Kuldhara village. He excavated a pond called Udhansar in the village.

The ruins of the village include 3 cremation grounds, with several devalis (memorial stones or cenotaphs). The village was settled by the early 13th century, as indicated by two devali inscriptions. These inscriptions are dated in the Bhattik Samvat (a calendar era starting in 623 CE), and record the deaths of two residents in 1235 CE and 1238 CE respectively.

== Demographics ==
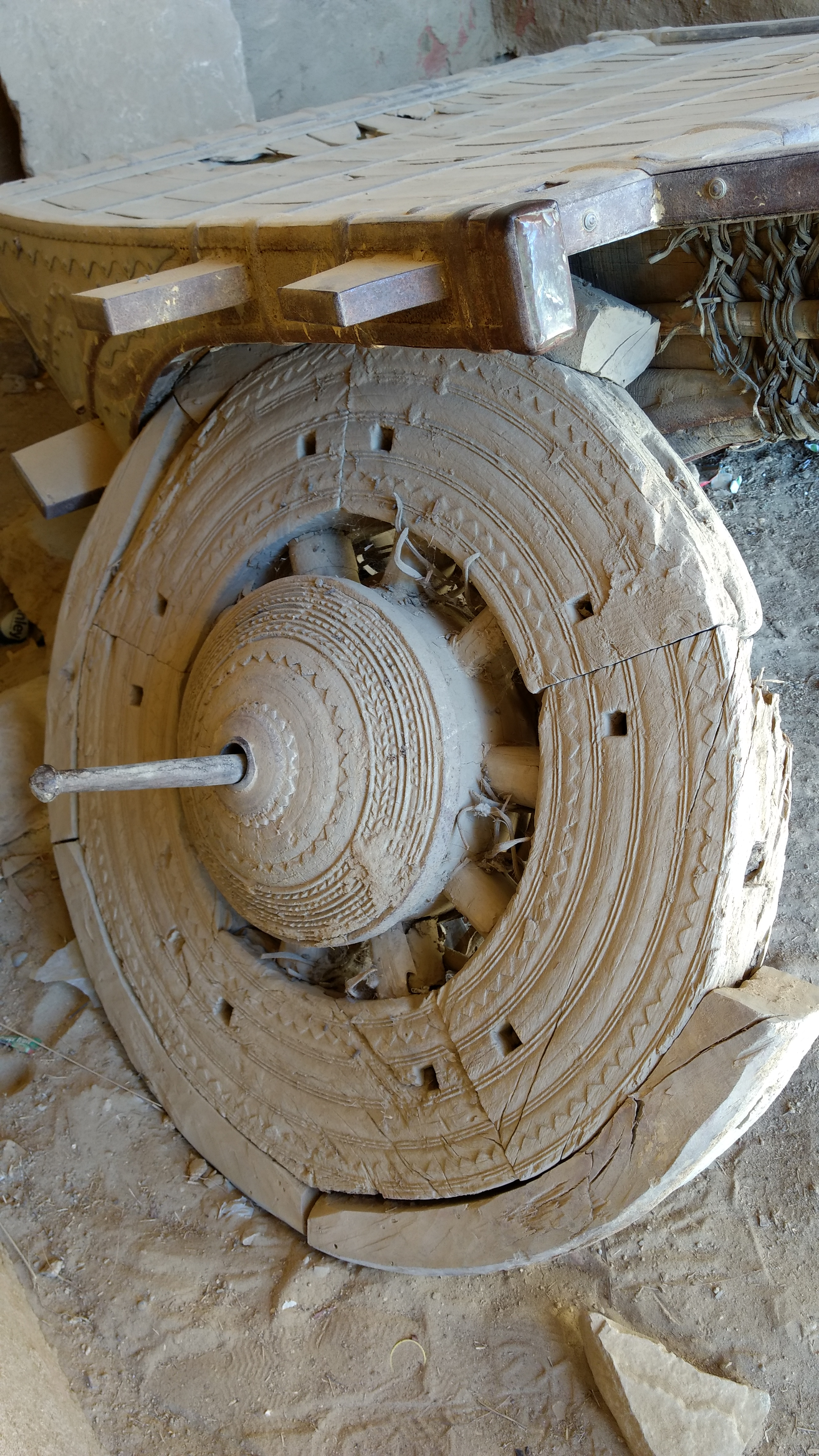
A cartwheel

=== Population ===
Ruins of 410 buildings can be seen in the former village. Another 200 buildings were located in the lower township on the outskirts of the village.

Lakshmi Chand's Tawarikh-i-Jaisalmer (1899) provides statistics about the Paliwal population and households of several villages. Using the figure of 3.97 persons per household based on these statistics, and considering the number of ruined houses as 400, S. A. N. Rezavi estimated the 17th-18th century population of Kuldhara as 1,588. The British officer James Tod recorded the 1815 population of Kuldhara as 800 (in 200 households), based on information from "the best informed natives". By this time, the Paliwals had already started deserting the village. By 1890, the population of the village had declined to 37 people; the number of houses was recorded as 117.

=== Social Groups ===
There are several other devali inscriptions at the site. These inscriptions do not mention the term "Paliwal"; they only describe the inhabitants as Brahmin ("Vrahman" or "Vaman"). Several inscriptions mention the caste of the residents as "Kuldhar" or "Kaldhar". It appears that Kuldhara was a caste group among Paliwal Brahmins, and the village was named after this caste.

Some inscriptions also mention the jati (sub-caste) and gotra (clan) of the residents. The various jatis mentioned in the inscriptions include Harjal, Harjalu, Harjaluni, Mudgal, Jisutiya, Loharthi, Lahthi, Lakhar, Saharan, Jag, Kalsar, and Mahajalar. The gotras mentioned include Asamar, Sutdhana, Gargvi and Gago. One inscription also mentions the kula (family lineage) of a Brahmin as Gonali. Apart from the Paliwal Brahmins, the inscriptions also mention two sutradhars (architects) named Dhanmag and Sujo Gopalna. The inscriptions indicate that the Brahmin residents married within the Brahmin community, although the jatis or sub-castes were exogamous.

== Culture ==
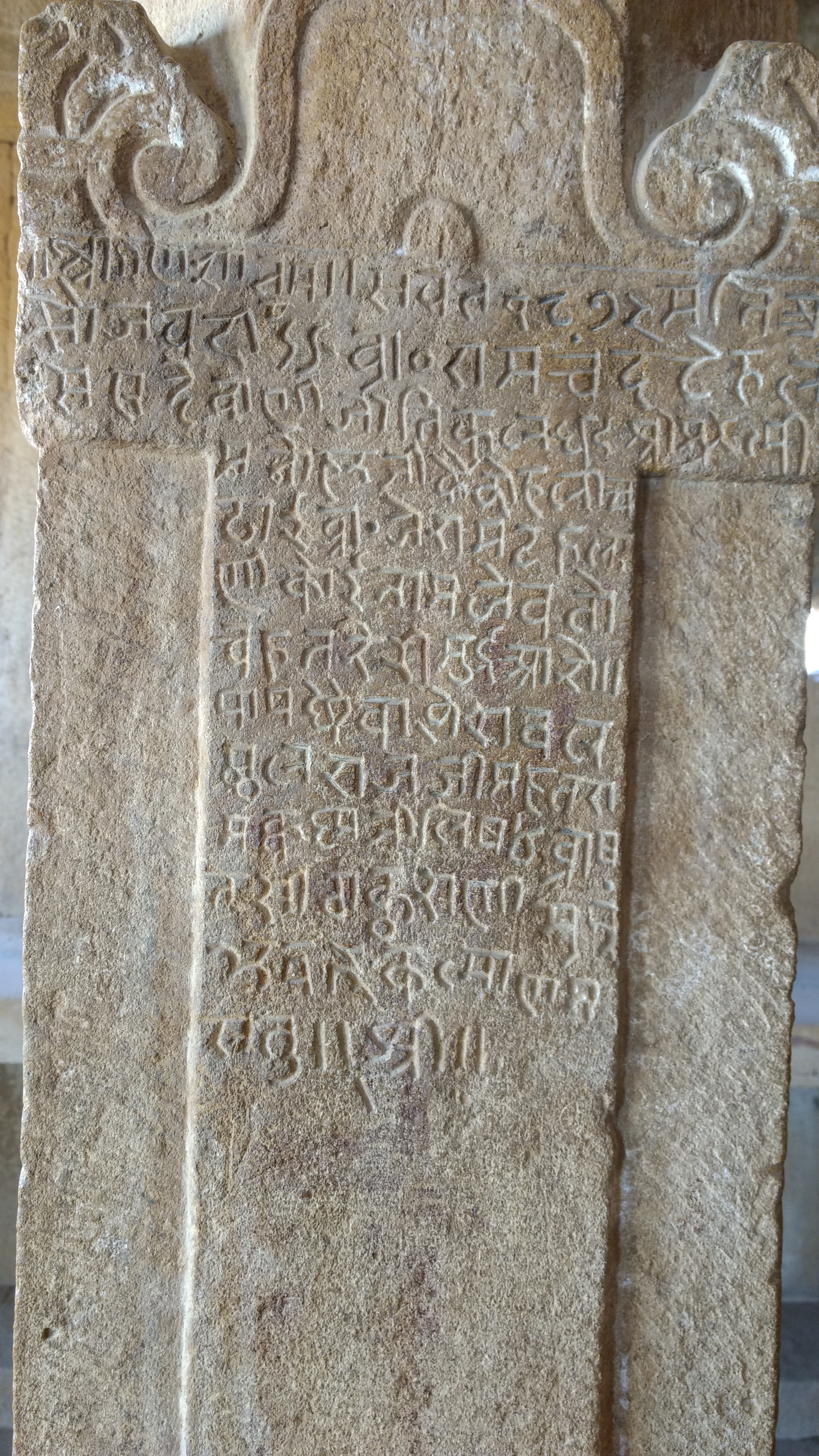
Inscription on a pillar inside the temple of Kuldhara

=== Religion ===
The residents of the village were Vaishnavites. The main temple of the village had sculptures of Vishnu and Mahishasura Mardini. Most of the inscriptions start with an invocation to Ganesha, whose miniature sculptures also appear on the gateways. The villagers also worshiped bull and a local horse-riding deity.

=== Fashion ===
If the idols on the devalis are considered as representatives of the contemporary fashion, it appears that the men of Kuldhara wore Mughal-style turbans and jamas (tunic-like garment) with kamarband (a type of waist belt). They generally sported a beard, wore a necklace and carried a khanjar (dagger). The women wore tunics or lehengas, and some of them wore necklaces.

== Economy ==
The villagers were mostly agricultural traders, bankers and farmers. They used ornamented pottery made of fine clay.

For agricultural purposes, the villagers used the water from the Kakni river and several wells. They also tapped the water using khareen, an artificial depression dammed on three sides. When the water in the khareen evaporated, it left soil conducive for growing jowar, wheat and gram. A 2.5 km^{2} khareen was situated to the south of Kuldhara.

The Kakni river branches into two streams near Kuldhara. The first branch is called "Masurdi nadi"; the second branch is now a drain. The Kakni river is a seasonal river. When it went dry, the villagers tapped groundwater using wells and a step-wells. A pillar inscription states that Tejpal, a Kuldhara Brahmin, commissioned the step-well in 1815 VS (1757 CE).

== Decline ==
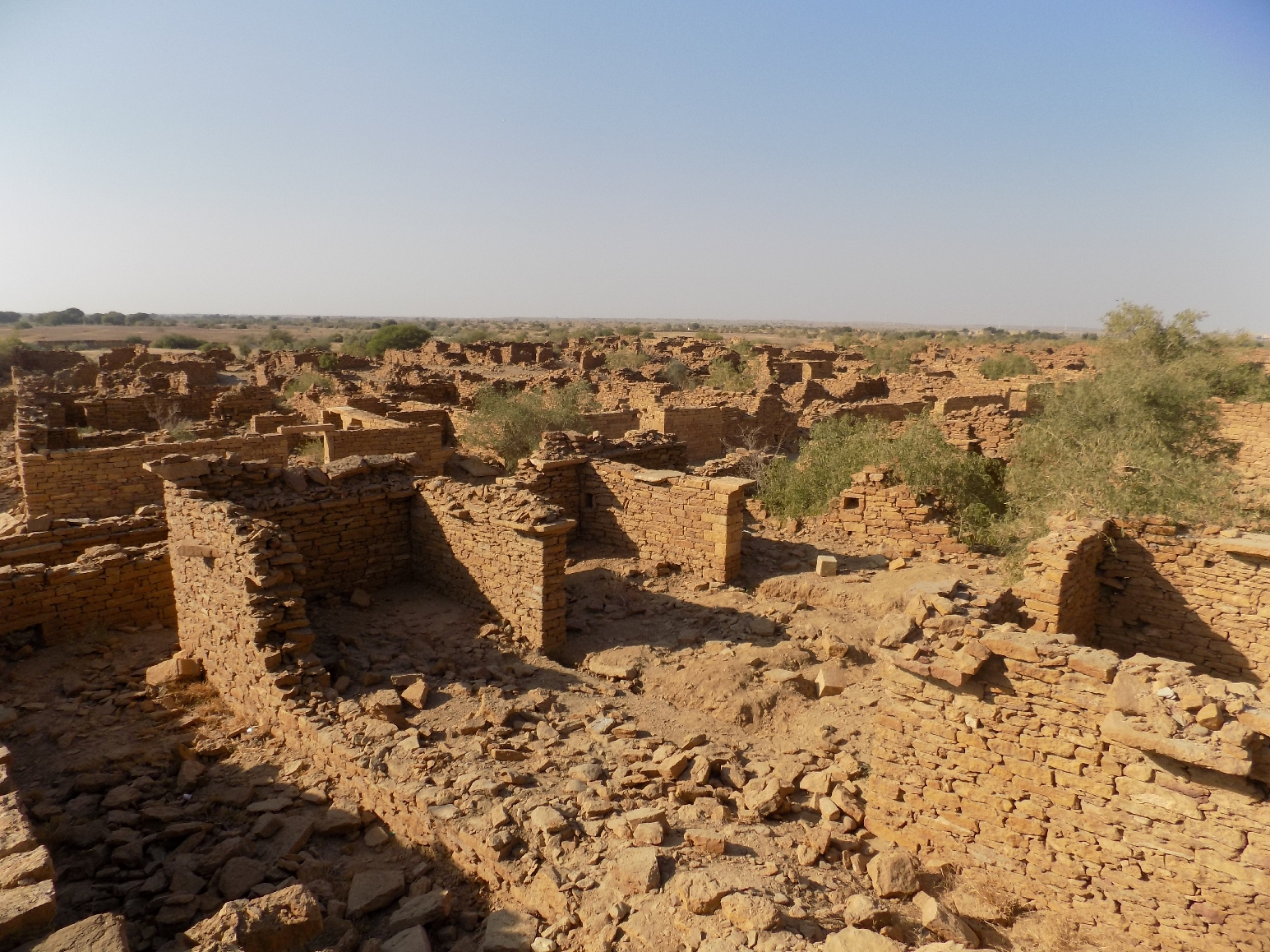
Ruins of Kuldhara

By the 19th century, the village had been deserted for unknown reasons. Possible causes proposed in the 20th century include lack of water and the atrocities of a Diwan (official) named Salim Singh (or Zalim Singh).

By 1815, most of the wells in the village had dried up. By 1850, only the step-well and two other deep wells were functional. When S. A. N. Rezavi surveyed the village in the 1990s, the only water remaining at the site was the stagnant water at some portions of the dried-up river bed. The dwindling water supply would have greatly reduced agricultural productivity, without a corresponding reduction in tax demands from the Jaisalmer State. This could have forced the Paliwals to abandon Kuldhara. A local legend claims that Salim Singh, the cruel minister of Jaisalmer, levied excessive taxes on the village, leading to its decline.

As stated earlier, the historical records suggest that the population of the village declined gradually: its estimated population was around 1,588 during 17th-18th century; around 800 in 1815; and 37 in 1890. However, a variation of the legend claims that the village was abandoned overnight. According to this version, the lecherous minister Salim Singh was attracted to a beautiful girl from the village. He sent his guards to force the villagers to hand over the girl. The villagers asked the guards to return next morning, and abandoned the village overnight. Another version claims that 83 other villages in the area were also abandoned overnight.

A 2017 study by A. B. Roy et al., published in Current Science, suggests that Kuldhara and other neighbouring Paliwal villages (such as Khabha) were destroyed because of an earthquake. According to the authors, the ruined houses in these villages show evidence of earthquake-related destruction, such as "collapsed roofs, fallen joists, lintels and pillars". Such extensive destruction cannot be attributed to "the normal processes of weathering and erosion". The authors further state that their theory is supported by "the evidence of recent tectonic activities and the observed ground movements along several major faults in the region".

== Tourism ==
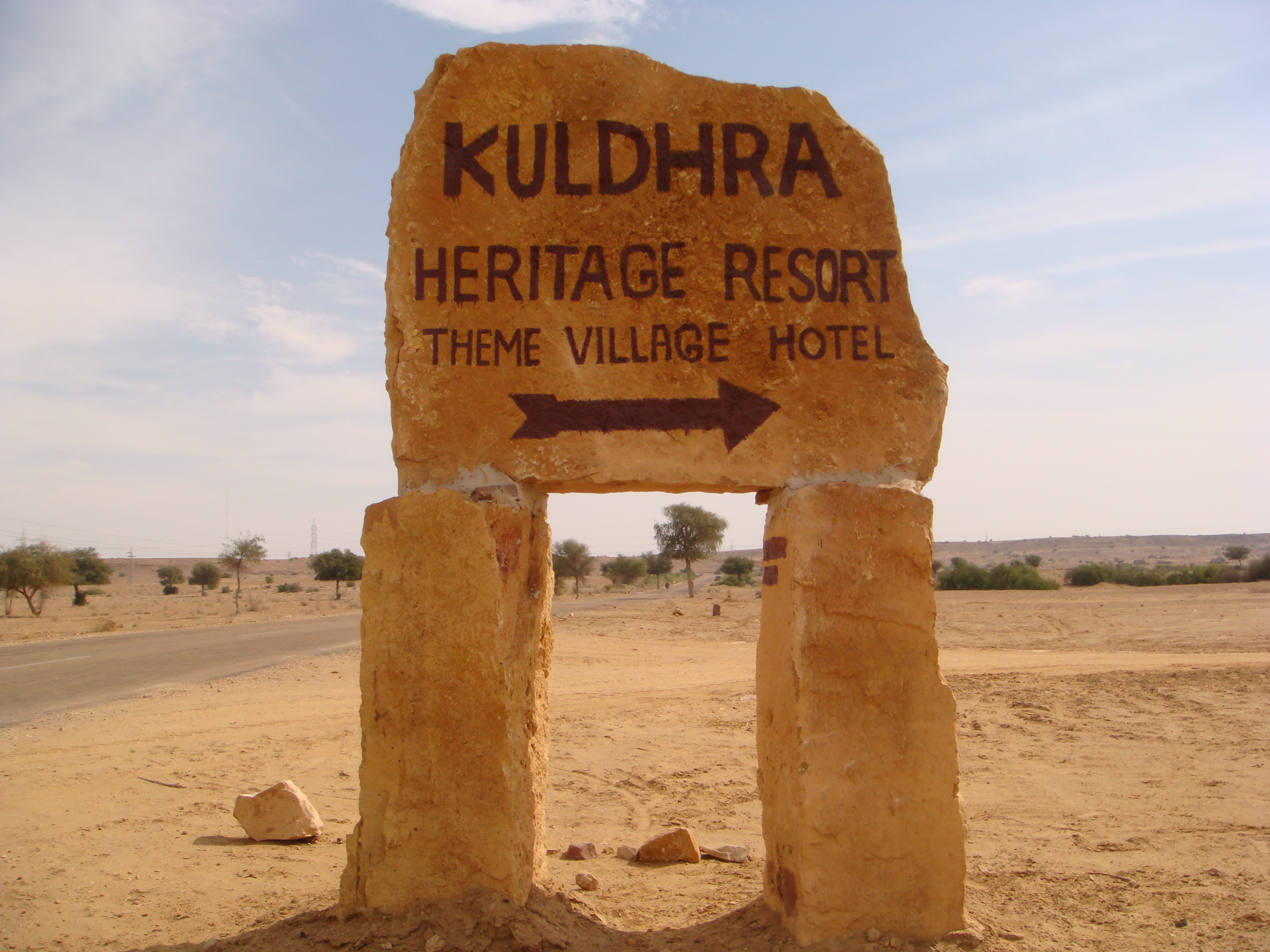
Kuldhara Heritage Resort signboard

The local legend claims that while deserting the village, the Paliwals imposed a curse that no one would be able to re-occupy the village. Those who tried to re-populate the village experienced paranormal activities, and therefore, the village remains uninhabited.

Gradually, the village acquired reputation as a haunted place, and started attracting tourists. The local residents around the area do not believe in the ghost stories, but propagate them in order to attract tourists. In the early 2010s, Gaurav Tiwari of Indian Paranormal Society claimed to have observed paranormal activities at the site. The 18-member team of the Society along with 12 other people spent a night at the village. They claimed to have encountered moving shadows, haunting voices, talking spirits, and other paranormal activities.

In 2006, the government set up a "Jurassic Cactus Park" at the site for botanical studies. In 2011, some scenes of the movie Agent Vinod were shot at the site. The film's crew raised new structures for their set. They painted the ruined walls with Taliban insignia and Urdu words for their shooting requirements. They also covered some of the walls with cow dung to get the rustic look. Many tourists accused them of defacing heritage property, and subsequently, the Rajasthan government stalled the shooting. The police booked cases against three of the crew members. The producers defended themselves blaming the episode on a misunderstanding, and stated that they believed they had the necessary permissions. The Archaeological department imposed a fine of ₹ 100,000 on the producers, and also asked them to deposit ₹ 300,000 for restoring the defaced structures. After three days of restoration, the Taliban pictures, the Urdu phrases and the cow dung were removed from the walls. In 2017, the climax scenes of the Tamil movie Theeran Adhigaaram Ondru were shot at Kuldhara.

In 2015, the Rajasthan government decided to actively develop the village as a tourist spot. The project is being undertaken as a public-private partnership with Jindal Steel Works. The plan includes establishment of visitor facilities such as a cafe, a lounge, a folk-dance performance area, night-stay cottages and shops.

== In popular culture ==
- The song "Meri Aankhon Mein Tu Hai" from the 1997 Hindi film Gupt: The Hidden Truth was filmed at the Kuldhara ruins.
- In 2010, a Hindi language feature film was released titled Kaalo. The film was based on folktales of the village.
- The 2023 Bengali language detective film The Eken: Ruddhaswas Rajasthan was shot in this village.

== See also ==
- List of reportedly haunted locations in India
- Akal Wood Fossil Park
- Desert National Park
- Rajkumari Ratnavati Girls School at Kanoi
- Sam sand dune safaris and resorts
