= History of Jaisalmer =

- Princely State; Jaisalmer
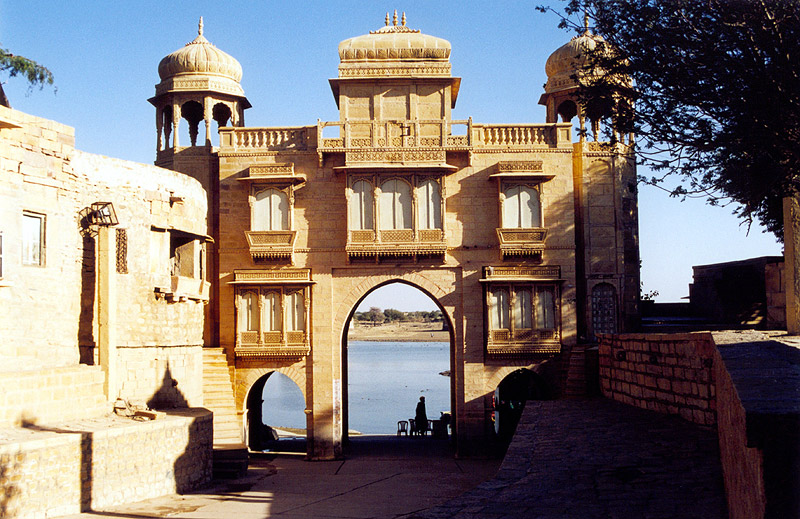
Location	western Rajasthan
19th-century flag	
Flag Colour	Yellow(Pila) and Saffron (Kesariya) colour with Umbrella(Chhatri) in its centre
- State established: 1156 AD
Language	Rajasthani, Hindi, Sanskrit
Dynasties	Bhati
Historical capitals	Lahore, Lodhruva, Jaisalmer

Jaisalmer state (also called Jaisalmer Region) is a region of Western Rajasthan state in western India. It lies in the southern part of the Thar Desert.

The region includes the present-day Jaisalmer District, some parts of Jodhpur, and Bikaner District. It is bounded on the north by Jangladesh region, on the east by Marwar region.

== Ancient Jaisalmer ==
From 1st century to 6th century the present Jaisalmer region was under rule of Raika, who came from Kutch and established three ancient villages namely Brahmsar, Kodumba and Laudrava. Lodhruva was a capital of Raika.

Between Raika and Bhati rules this region was ruled by local Sindhi tribes.

Bhati came from Bhatner and took control of this region. The Maharajas of Jaisalmer trace their lineage back to Jaitsimha, a ruler of a Bhati clan, through Deoraj, a famous prince of the Yaduvanshi Bhati Rajput ruler during the 9th century. With him the title of "Rawal" commenced. "Rawal" means "of the Royal house".

According to legend, Deoraj was to marry the daughter of a neighbouring chief. Deoraj's father and 800 of his family and followers were surprised and massacred at the wedding. Deoraj escaped with the aid of a Brahmin yogi who disguised the prince as a fellow Brahmin. When confronted by the rival chief's followers hunting for Deoraj, the Brahmin convinced them that the man with him was another Brahmin by eating from the same dish, something no Brahmin holy man would do with someone of another caste. Deoraj and his remaining clan members were able to recover from the loss of so many such that later he built the stronghold of Derawar. Deoraj later captured Laudrava (located about 15 km to the south-east of Jaisalmer) from another Rajput clan and made it his capital.

The major opponents of the Bhati were the Rathor clans of Jodhpur and Bikaner. They used to fight battles for the possession of forts and waterholes as from early times the Jaisalmer region had been criss-crossed by camel caravan trade routes which connected northern India and central Asia with the ports of Gujarat on the Arabian Sea coast of India and hence on to Persia and Arabia and Egypt. Jaisalmer's location made it ideally located as a staging post and for imposing taxes on this trade.

== Bhati kingdom ==
The Bhati rulers originally ruled parts of Afghanistan; their ancestor Rawal Gaj is believed to have founded the city of Gajni. According to James Tod, this city is present-day Ghazni in Afghanistan, while Cunningham identifies it as modern-day Rawalpindi. His descendant Rawal Salivahan is believed to have founded the city of Sialkot and made it his new capital. Salivahan defeated the Indo-Scythians in 78 CE at Kahror, assuming the title of Saka-ari (foe of the Sakas). Salivahan's grandson, Rao Bhati conquered several neighbouring regions. It is from Rao Bhati that the Bhati clan derives its name.

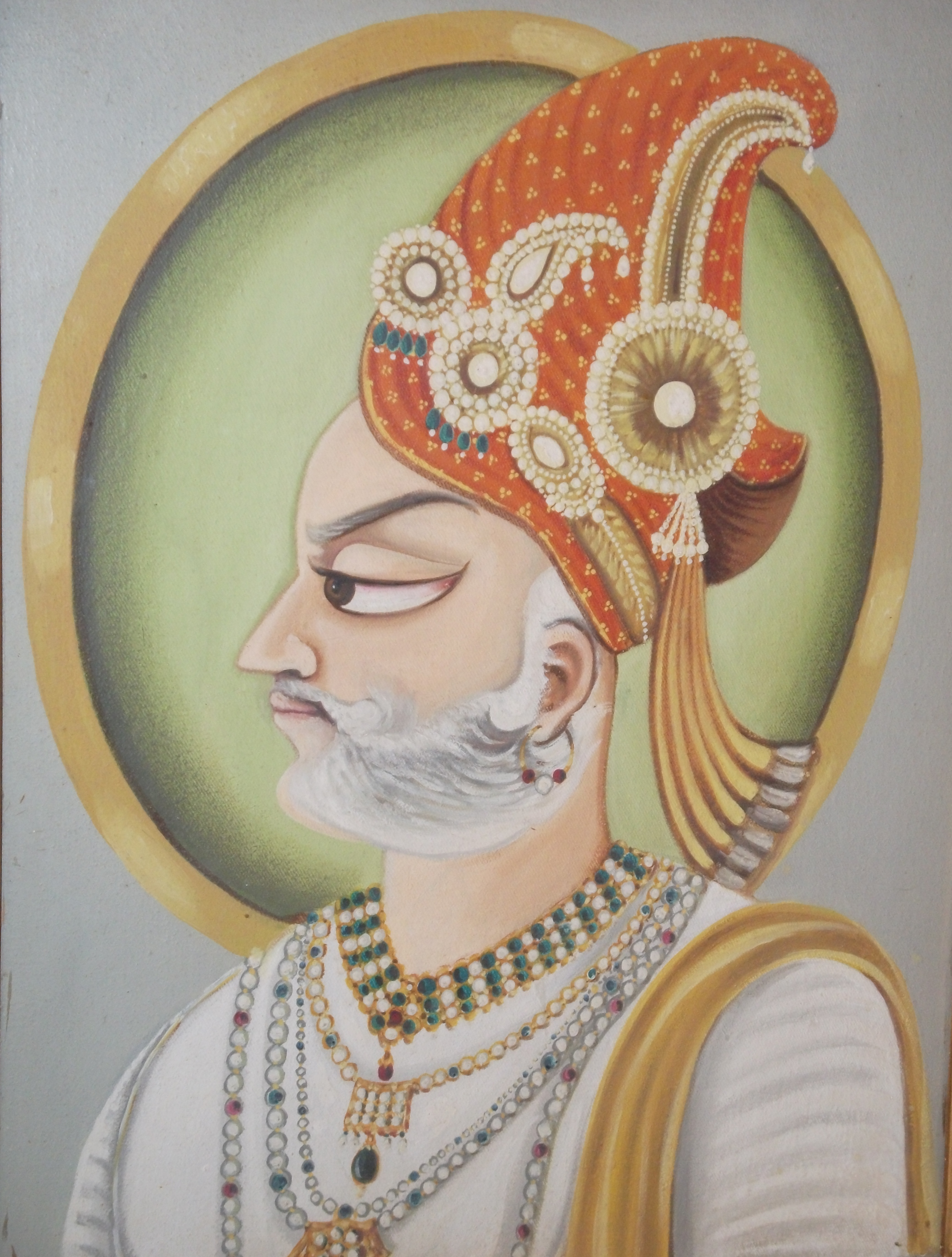
Rawal Jaisal founder of main Bhati kingdom

=== Derawar fort ===
Derawar fort was first built in the 9th century CE by Maharaja of Parmar Rajputs, which was admired by Rai Jajja Bhutta, a Hindu Rajput ruler of the Bhutta clan, and supported Rawal Deoraj Bhati the king of Jaisalmer and residents of Bahawalpur. The fort was initially known as Dera Rawal, and later referred to as Dera Rawar, which with the passage of time came to be pronounced Derawar, its present name.

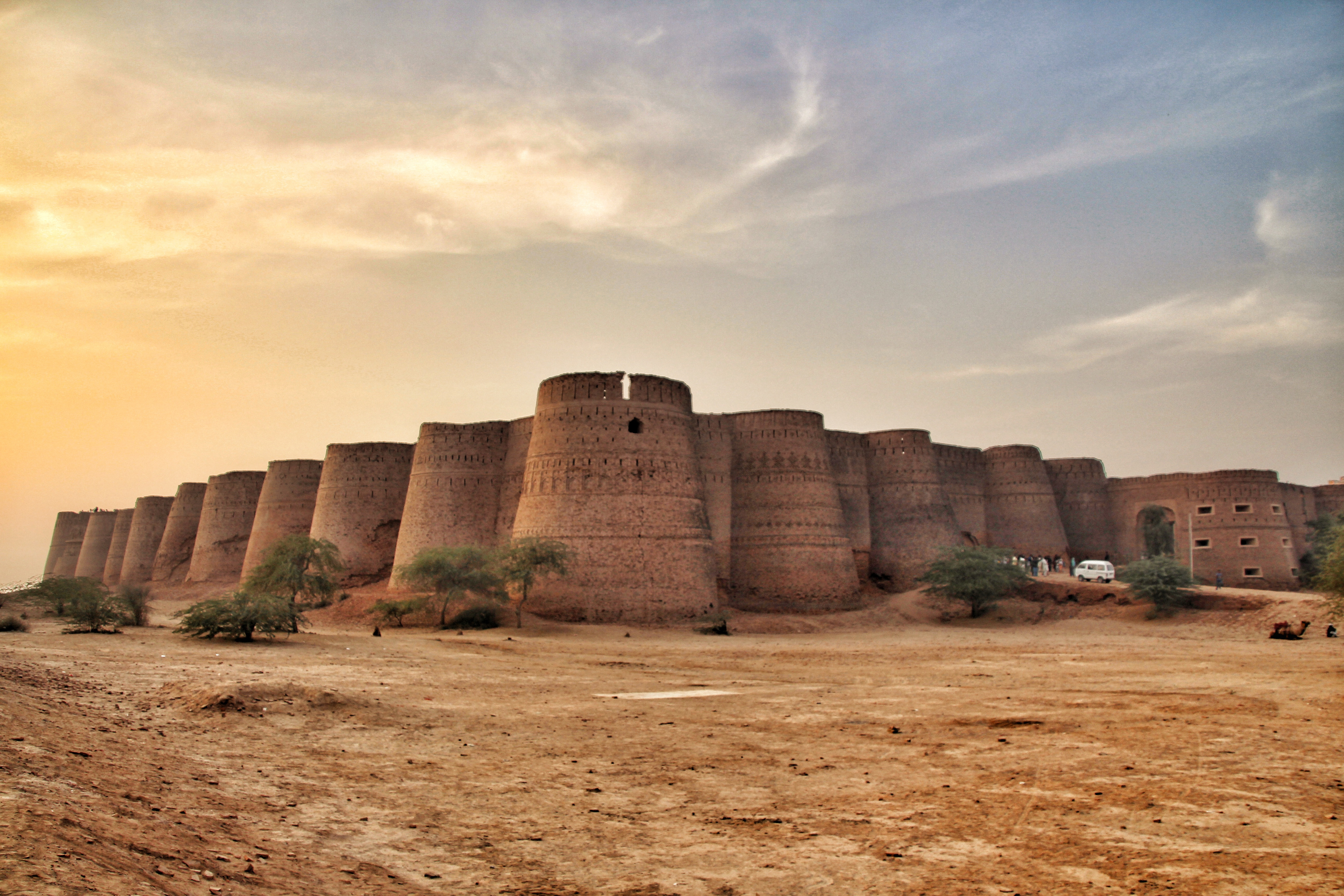
Derawar Fort built by Bhati ruler Rai Jajja Bhati in 9th century

The state of Jaisalmer had its foundations in what remains of the Empire ruled by the Bhati dynasty. Early Bhati rulers ruled over large empire stretching from Ghazni in modern-day Afghanistan to Sialkot, Lahore and Rawalpindi in modern-day Pakistan to Bhatinda, Muktsar & Hanumangarh in Modern day India. The empire crumbled over time because of continuous invasions from the central Asia. According to Satish Chandra, the Hindu Shahis of Afghanistan made an alliance with the Bhati rulers of Multhan, because they wanted to end the slave raids made by the Turkic ruler of Ghazni, however the alliance was defeated by Alp Tigin in 977 CE. Bhati dominions continued to be shifted towards the South as they ruled Multan, then finally got pushed into Cholistan and Jaisalmer where Rawal Devaraja built Dera Rawal / Derawar. Jaisalmer was the new capital founded in 1156 by Maharawal Jaisal Singh and the state took its name from the capital. On 11 December 1818 Jaisalmer became a British protectorate in the Rajputana Agency.

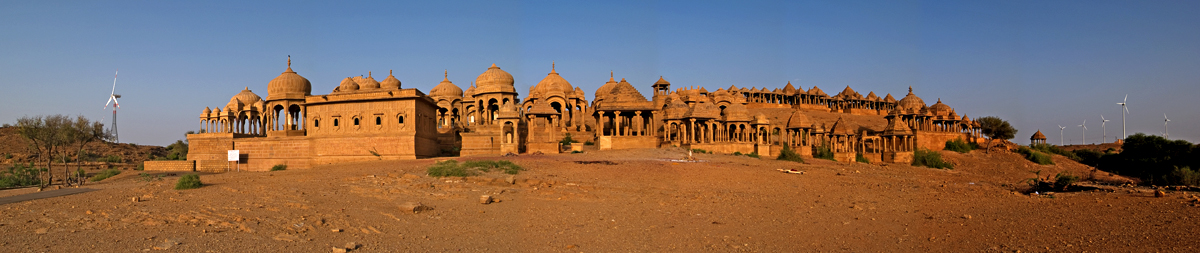
Bada Bagh panorama

=== History ===
In the 12th century, Rawal Jaisal the eldest son of the Rawal of Deoraj was passed over in favour of a younger half-brother for the throne of Laudrava.

While checking out Trikuta a massive triangular rock rising more than 75 metres out of the surrounding sands as a more secure location for a new capital, Rawal Jaisal meet a sage called Eesul, who was staying on the rock. Upon learning that Jaisal was of yadhuvanshi descent, Eesul told him that according to ancient mythology Krishna and Bhima had come to this location for a ceremony, where Krishna had prophesied that a descendant of yadhuvanshi clan would one day establish a kingdom here Eesul showed him a spring which Krishna had created and his prophecy craved into a rock. Encouraged by this meeting Rawal decided to move his capital to this location despite Eesul predicting that it would be sacked two and a half times.

In 1156, Rawal Jaisal established his new capital in the form of a mud fort and named it Jaisalmer after himself. According to most historians, the Sikh Jats of Majha and Malwa Doab's and the rulers of Kapurthala state in Doaba in Punjab trace their direct lineage to Jaisalmer royal families over the centuries.

The first Jauhar of Jaisalmer occurred in 1294, during the reign of Turkic ruler of Delhi, Alauddin Khalji. It was provoked by Bhatis' raid on a massive treasure caravan being transported on 3000 horses and mules. Alauddin Khalji was so outraged that his army marched upon Jaisalmer. Rawal Jethsi sent the children, elderly and sick, together with some troops to refuge in the desert and applied a scorched earth policy to the countryside surrounding Jaisalmer while building up a massive store of food within the fort. According to local ballads, the Bhatis defended the fort for 8 years during which the forces left outside of the walls occupied themselves attacking the supply lines of the besiegers. During the siege Rawal Jethsi died and was succeeded by his son Mulraj II. By 1294 the besiegers had received sufficient reinforcements that they were able to impose a complete blockade of the fort which soon exhausted the Bhati's ammunition and food. The Bhatis, facing certain defeat, decided there was no alternative but to perform the rite of Jauhar. 24,000 women committed suicide, most on a funeral pyre though some were killed by the swords of their male relations when the pyre proved too small. The men 3,800, in number then threw open the gates of the fort and advanced to their death.

In the late 14th century, Firuz Shah Tughluq, a Turkic ruler of Delhi, also besieged Jaisalmer after a prince of Jaisalmer raided his camp at Anasagar Lake near Ajmer and carried away his prize steed. The siege led to the second jauhar of the prophecy, the suicide of 16,000 women and the death of Rawal Dudu and his son Tilaski together with 1,700 warriors.

The "half jauhar" of the prophecy occurred in the 16th century when Amir Ali, an Afghan chieftain obtained Rawal Lunakaran's permission to let his wives visit the queens of Jaisalmer. Instead of a retinue of palanquins containing women they were full of armed warriors, which took the guards of the fort by surprise. When it seemed to the Rawal that he was fighting a losing battle he slaughtered his womenfolk with his own hands as there was insufficient time to arrange a funeral pyre.

== British Raj ==
Flag of the princely state of Jaisalmer

In 1818, the Rawals of Jaisalmer signed a treaty with the British, and was guaranteed the royal succession. Jaisalmer was one of the last rajput states to sign a treaty with the British, in whose documents the state was variously recorded under the spelling Jayulmir, Jessulmer, Jessumere. Jaisalmer was forced to invoke the provisions of the treaty and call on the services of the British in 1829 to avert a war with Bikaner and 10 years later in 1839 for the First Anglo-Afghan War.

On a clandestine mapping mission, great game maestro Alexander Burnes was one of the first Europeans to visit the royal castle, arriving on 8 January 1830. He described the fortress as 'commanding and magnificent' and found the Rawal Gaj Singh to be affable, most dignified if plainly dressed, rather stout but intelligent.

During the British Raj, Jaisalmer was the seat of a princely state of the same name, and was entitled to a 15 gun salute. As traditionally, the main source of income for the kingdom was levies on caravans . The economy was heavily affected when Bombay emerged as a major port and sea trade replaced the traditional land routes. Maharawals Ranjit Singh and Bairi Sal Singh attempted to turn around the decline but the dramatic reduction in trade impoverished the kingdom. A severe drought and resulting famine from 1895 to 1900 during the reign of Maharawal Shalivahan Singh only made matters worse by causing widespread loss of the livestock that the increasingly agriculturally based kingdom relied upon.

Maharawal Jawahir Singh's (1914–49) attempts at modernisation also failed to turn the kingdom's economy around and it remained isolated and backwards compared with other areas of Rajasthan.

== List of rulers ==
=== Rawals ===
- Rawal Jaisal Singh (1153–1168), official founder of kingdom
- Rawal Shalivahan Singh II (1168–1200)
- Rawal Baijal Singh (1200–1200)
- Rawal Kailan Singh (1200–1219)
- Rawal Chachak Deo Singh (1219–1241)
- Rawal Karan Singh I (1241–1271)
- Rawal Lakhan Sen (1271–1275)
- Rawal Punpal Singh (1275–1276)
- Rawal Jaitsi Singh I (1276–1294)
- Rawal Mulraj Singh I (1294–1295)
- Rawal Durjan Sal (Duda) (1295–1306)
- Rawal Gharsi Singh (1306–1335)
- Rawal Kehar Singh II (1335–1402)
- Rawal Lachhman Singh (1402–1436)
- Rawal Bersi Singh (1436–1448)
- Rawal Chachak Deo Singh II (1448–1457)
- Rawal Devidas Singh (1457–1497)
- Rawal Jaitsi Singh II (1497–1530)
- Rawal Karan Singh II (1530–1530)
- Rawal Lunkaran Singh (1530–1551)
- Rawal Maldev Singh (1551–1562)
- Rawal Harraj Singh (1562–1578)
- Rawal Bhim Singh (1578–1624)
- Rawal Kalyan Singh (1624–1634)
- Rawal Manohar Das Singh (1634–1648)
- Rawal Ram-Chandra Singh (1648–1651)
- Rawal Sabal Singh (1651–1661)

=== Maharawals ===
- Maharawal Ammar Singh of Jaisalmer (1661–1702)
- Maharawal Jaswant Singh of Jaisalmer (1702–1708)
- Maharawal Budh Singh (1708–1722)
- Maharawal Akhil Singh (1722–1762)
- Maharawal Mulraj II (1762–1820)
- Maharawal Gaj Singh (1820–1846)
- Maharawal Ranjit Singh of Jaisalmer (1846–1864)
- Maharawal Bairi Sal (1864–1891)
- Maharawal Shalivahan Singh III (1891 –1914)
- Maharawal Jawahir Singh (1914–1947)
- Girdhar Singh (1949–1950), last ruler of kingdom merge state with Rajasthan Union in 1949 CE.

=== Titular Kings ===
- Raghunath Singh (1950–1982)
- Brijraj Singh (1982–2020)
- Chaitanya Raj Singh (2020–)

=== Dewans ===
- List of Dewans (chief ministers)
1. Mohata Nathmal (1885–1891)
2. Mehta Jagjiwan (1890–1903)
3. Thakur Kushal Singh (acting) (1890?–1900)
4. Rawatmal Purohit Khetrapalia (acting) (1900–1909)
5. Lakshmi Das Sapat (1909–1911)
6. Mohammed Niyaz Ali Kazi (1911–1912)
7. Murarji Rooji (1912–1930)
8. M.L. Khosala
9. Pandit Jamana Lal
10. Munshi Nand Kishore
11. Lala Rakhpat Raj
12. P.K. Shurugula
13. Brij Mohan Nath Zutshi
14. Anand Swaroop
15. Onkar Singh
16. Lakhpat Rai Sikund (1940–1942)

== See also ==
- Jaisalmer
- History of Rajasthan
