= Sam, Jaisalmer =

City in Rajasthan, India

Coordinates: 26°49′47″N 70°30′25″E

Sam
- City
- Country: India
- State: Rajasthan
- District: Jaisalmer

Area
  - Total: 3,494 ha (8,630 acres)

Population (2011)
  - Total: 1,502
- Time zone: UTC+5:30 (IST)
- PIN: 345001

Sam is city and tehsil in Jaisalmer district in Rajasthan. It is situated 45 km away from district headquarter Jaisalmer.

== Demographics ==
Sam has a total population of 1,502 peoples, out of which male population is 785 while female population is 717 according to Census 2011.

== See also ==
- Akal Wood Fossil Park
- Desert National Park
- Kuldhara
- Rajkumari Ratnavati Girls School at Kanoi
