= Momdau =

Village in Rajasthan, India

- Country: India
- State: Rajasthan
- District: Jaisalmer

Population (2011)
  - Total: 15
- Time zone: UTC+5:30 (IST)

Momdau is a village located in the Jaisalmer district of the state of Rajasthan in northern India. The village falls under Shahgarh Gram Panchayat of Sam block of Jaisalmer Subdivision. The village is administered by a Sarpanch, in accordance with the Panchayati Raj Act.

== Population ==
According to the 2011 Census, there are only 10 males and 5 females in the village, in a total of 3 houses. Meaning the total population is 15 with an average of 5 people per family.
