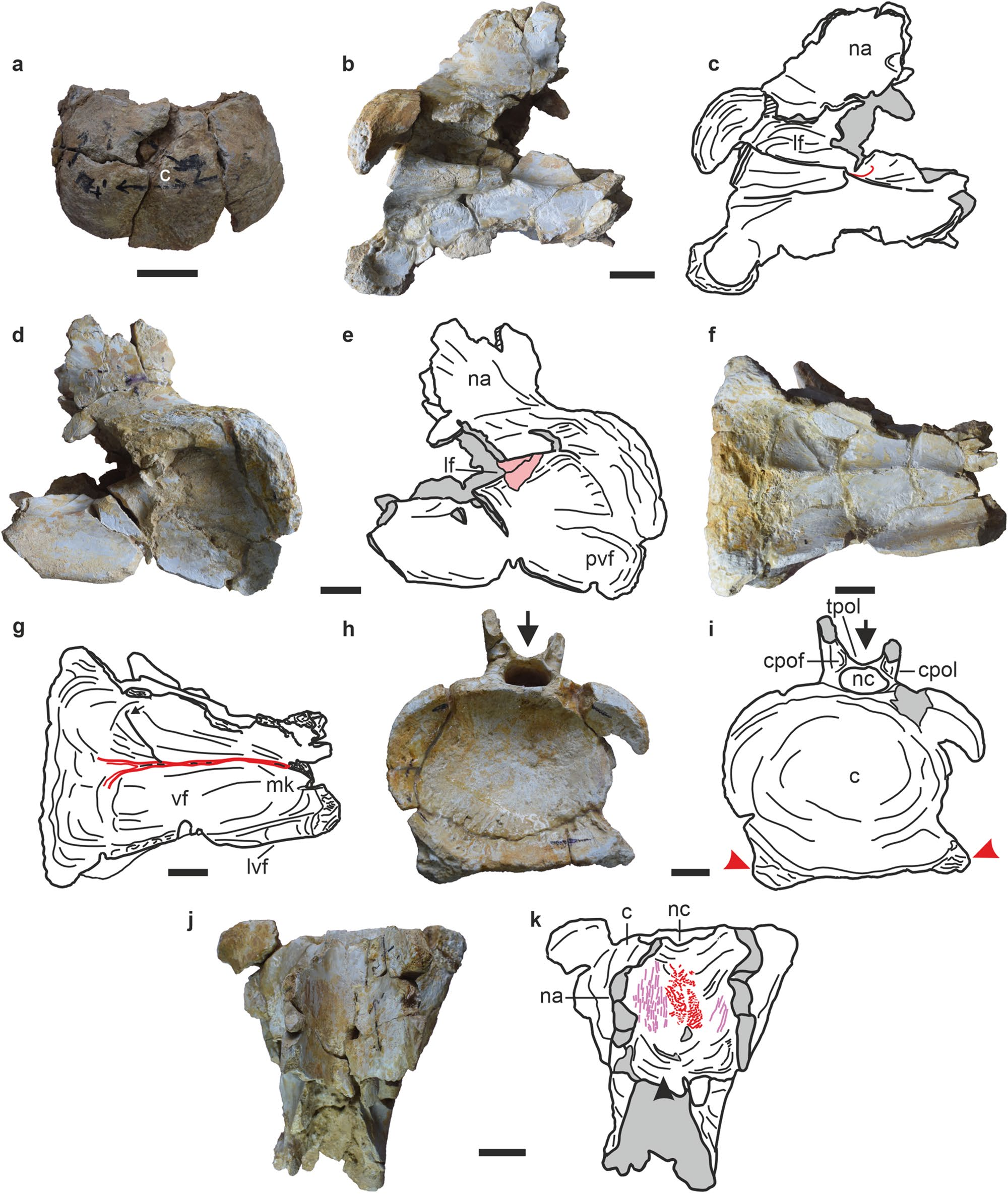
- Cervical vertebrae of the holotype

Scientific classification
- Kingdom: Animalia
- Phylum: Chordata
- Class: Reptilia
- Clade: Dinosauria
- Clade: Saurischia
- Clade: †Sauropodomorpha
- Clade: †Sauropoda
- Clade: †Eusauropoda
- Genus: †Tharosaurus; Bajpai et al., 2023
- Species: †T. indicus

Binomial name
- †Tharosaurus indicus Bajpai et al., 2023

= Tharosaurus =

Tharosaurus Temporal range: Middle Jurassic, 168.3–166.1 Ma

Genus of dicraeosaurid dinosaurs

Tharosaurus (meaning "Thar Desert lizard") is an extinct genus of potentially dubious eusauropod sauropod dinosaurs from the Middle Jurassic Jaisalmer Formation of India. The genus contains a single species, Tharosaurus indicus, known from a fragmentary skeleton including several vertebrae and a rib. When it was named in 2023, Tharosaurus was interpreted as the earliest known diplodocoid and the first member of this clade described from India. However, a later revision of the fossil material argued for a position outside of this clade, as an indeterminate eusauropod. This revision could not find unique features in the Tharosaurus specimen, so it was classified as a nomen dubium.

== Discovery and naming ==
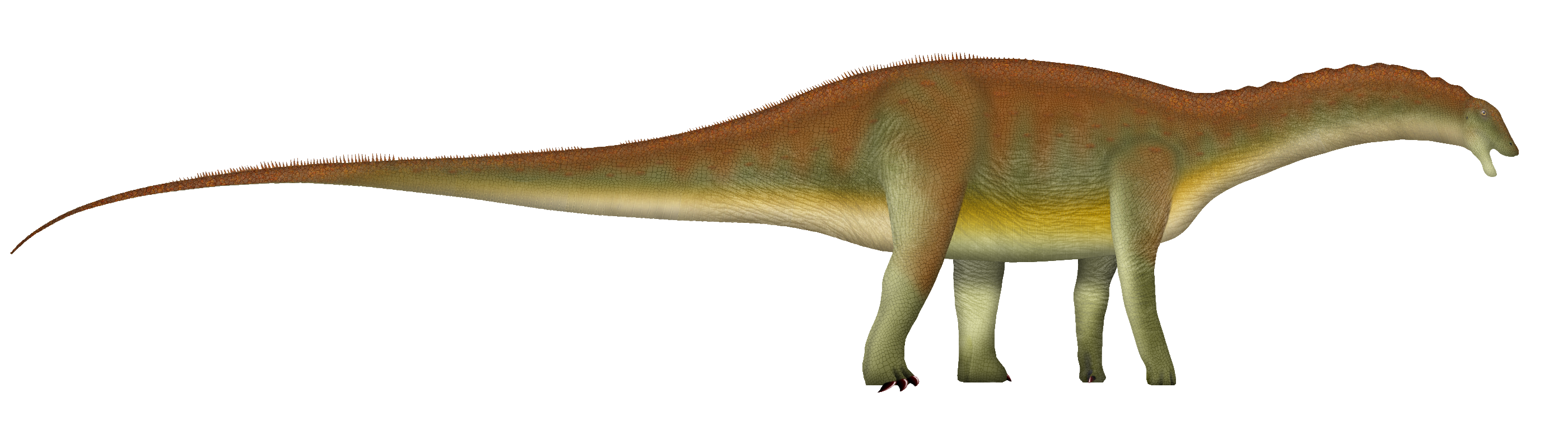
Speculative life restoration as a dicraeosaurid

The Tharosaurus holotype specimen, RWR-241 (A–K), was discovered between 2019 and 2021 in sediments of the Jaisalmer Formation near Jethwai village in Jaisalmer district of Rajasthan state in western India. The specimen consists of partial cervical, dorsal, and caudal vertebrae and a dorsal rib.

Tharosaurus type locality in Jaisalmer Formation near Jethwai village, Jaisalmer district, Rajasthan, India

In 2023, Sunil Bajpai and colleagues described Tharosaurus indicus as a new genus and species of dicraeosaurid sauropod based on these fossil remains. The generic name, "Tharosaurus", combines a reference to the Thar Desert where the holotype was found with the Greek word "sauros", meaning "lizard". The specific name, "indicus", refers to the discovery of the specimen in India.

== Classification ==
In 2023, Bajpai and colleagues recovered Tharosaurus as an early-diverging dicraeosaurid, suggesting it represents a relic of a lineage that evolved in India and later spread across the world. Tharosaurus is the oldest dicraeosaurid, as well as the oldest diplodocoid. The results of their phylogenetic analyses are shown in the cladogram below:

- Diplodocoidea
  - Rebbachisauridae
  - Flagellicaudata
    - Diplodocidae
    - Dicraeosauridae
      - Suuwassea
      - - Lingwulong
        - - Bajadasaurus
          - - Tharosaurus
            - - Pilmatueia
              - Amargatitanis
              - - Brachytrachelopan
                - - Dicraeosaurus hansemanni
                  - Amargasaurus

In 2025, Philip D. Mannion and Andrew J. Moore published a reassessment of Tharosaurus and the phylogenetic relationships of diplodocoids. Their observations and phylogenetic analyses instead supported a position for this genus outside of the Diplodocoidea, leading the researchers to classify it as an indeterminate member of the Eusauropoda. The position of Tharosaurus within this broader clade is unclear, and since the researchers were unable to identify clear autapomorphies (unique characters) in the Tharosaurus holotype, they concluded it represents a nomen dubium. They also noted that an isolated tooth described from the formation may belong to a turiasaur, and that, while Tharosaurus can not be definitively assigned to that clade, this may be due to the poor nature of its preservation and limited completeness.

== Paleoenvironment ==
The Jaisalmer Formation represents a deposit on the Tethyan coast of India. Other dinosaurs from this environment include a large theropod and a turiasaurian sauropod both known only from teeth, along with a possible spinosaurid known only from a toe claw.
