= Rajkumari Ratnavati Girls School =

Private school in Jaisalmer, India

Address
- Kanoi village Jaisalmer, Rajasthan; India

Information
- Type: Private
- Enrollment: 400 (April 2020)
- Website: www.cittaindia.org

Rajkumari Ratnavati Girls School is a girls' school in the rural Thar Desert of Jaisalmer in the Indian state of Rajasthan. The school is unique in that the architects designed it in the shape of an oval that can withstand temperatures of up to 50 degrees Celsius. The school can accommodate 400 girls from kindergarten to tenth grade. The school is aimed to provide education and training in traditional skill sets such as artistry, weaving, embroidery for women. Rajkumari Ratnavati Girls School is owned and managed by CITTA India, and was designed by Diana Kellogg Architects. It is on the boundary of Desert National Park, and the city of Sam, Jaisalmer lie close by in the west which is the location of sand dune safaris and resorts.

== History ==
The school is named after "Ratnavati," the Jaisalmer princess. She was the daughter of Maharawal Ratan Singh.

== School uniform ==
Sabyasachi Mukherjee of India designed the school uniforms through Ajrak, a local printing technique similar to printing.

== Architecture ==
Rajkumari Ratnavati Girls School is located in the rural region surrounding Jaisalmer, near the hamlet of Kanoi. Its architecture is unique and distinctive, featuring an oval-shaped building amidst the desert landscape. The elliptical-shaped structure, angled towards the prevailing winds, is designed to effectively circulate cool air, aligning with the project's ethos. Jaisalmer stonemasons built the school out of precut golden sandstone.

=== Building material ===
CITTA India employed traditional methods in the design of the structure, one of which was the application of lime plaster on the interior walls. Lime plaster is a natural, porous material that has a cooling effect. Additionally, a jali wall was added into the design, which is a sandstone grid that promotes acceleration of wind through the Venturi effect. The school is made of local yellow sandstone that was handcrafted by local artisans. The building is designed in a way that it does not require the use of air conditioning.

=== Building ===
The school is one of three buildings in the complex known as the "GYAAN Center."

- The hall is an area designated for a library and a museum, and a space for performances and art exhibitions for local crafts such as textiles. The women could learn local weaving and embroidery techniques.
- The courtyard has a rainwater harvesting facility.

==== Awards ====
- The school was awarded the AD100 in 2020 – an annual survey of the best names in design by Architectural Digest India.

== CITTA ==
The royal family of Jaisalmer and Manvendra Singh Shekhawat donated the land for the school.

== See also ==
- Akal Wood Fossil Park
- Desert National Park
- Kuldhara
- Sam sand dune safaris and resorts
