= Mokla =

- Village
- Location in Rajasthan, India
- Coordinates: 27.1212977°N 70.6219696°E
- Country: India
- State: Rajasthan
- District: Jaisalmer
- Tehsil: Jaisalamer tehsil

Population (2011)
  - Total: 997
- Time zone: UTC+5:30 (IST)
- PIN: 345001

Mokla (also called Mokhla) is a village located in Jaisalmer district of the Indian state of Rajasthan.

== Demographics ==
According to the 2011 Census of India, Mokla village has a total population of 997. The number of households in the village is 188. The female population is 46.9%.
