= Abhainagar =

Village in Jaisalmer, Rajasthan, India

- Village
- Location in Rajasthan, India
- Coordinates: 26.8749957°N 71.0722055°E
- Country: India
- State: Rajasthan
- District: Jaisalmer
- Tehsil: Jaisalamer tehsil

Population (2011)
  - Total: 997
- Time zone: UTC+5:30 (IST)
- PIN: 345001

Abhainagar (also called Abhay Nagar) is a village located in the Jaisalmer district of the Indian state of Rajasthan. It is located in Jaisalmer tehsil. It is situated 22 km east of the district headquarters in Jaisalmer, and 546 km away from the capital Jaipur.

== Demographics ==
According to the 2011 Census of India, Abhainagar village has a total population of 269 living in 49 houses. The female population comprised 43.9% of the total.
