= Lodhruva =

Lodrawa Lodurva, Lodarva or Laudrava
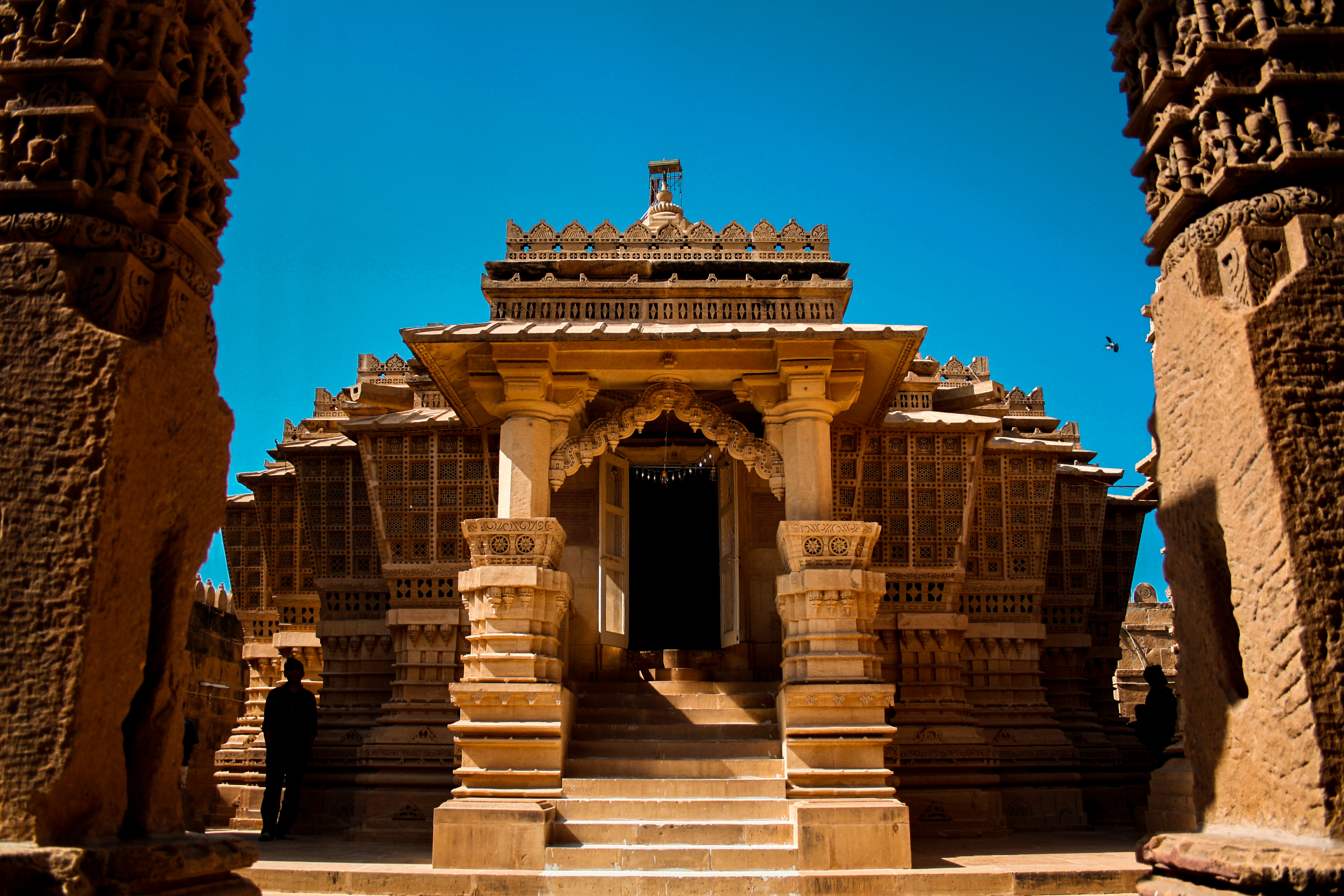
- Lodhurva Jain temple
- Country: India
- State: Rajasthan
- District: Jaisalmer

Government
  - Type: Village

Languages
  - Official: Hindi, Rajasthani

Lodrawa (aka Lodurva, Lodarva or Laudrava) is a village in Jaisalmer district, Rajasthan, India. It is located 15 kilometers to the north-west of Jaisalmer. The village and the surrounding area are famous for their historic temples, mostly Jain, originally constructed in the pre-12th-century Maru-Gurjara architecture of the Chaulukya dynasty and reconstructed in a similar but more ornate revivalist style in the 17th century.

== History ==
The Lodrawa stood on an ancient trade route through the Thar Desert, which also made it vulnerable to frequent attacks. Mahmud of Ghazni laid siege on the city in 1025 CE. It was again ransacked by Muhammad Ghori in 1152 CE, leading to its abandonment and the establishment of the new fortified capital of Jaisalmer by Rawal Jaisal in 1156 CE. Jaisalmer was situated 16 km away on the Trikuta Hill, where the present fortress stands today.

Lodrawa served as the capital of the Bhatis of Jaisalmer state until Rawal Jaisal founded Jaisalmer and moved the capital in 1156 CE.

It was also the setting for the doomed love story of Princess Mumal and Mahendra, a prince of Soomra dynasty of Amarkot, recounted in local folklore and songs.

== Visitor's attractions ==
Lodrawa is a popular tourist destination, known for its architectural ruins and surrounding sand dunes. Lodrawa is also famous for the Jain temple dedicated to the 23rd Tirthankara, Parshvanatha. The original temple was destroyed in 1178 AD when Muhammad Ghori attacked the city, but it was reconstructed by Seth Tharu Shah in 1615, with further additions in 1675 and 1687. Restored using state-of-the-art methods in the late 1970s, the temples are reminders of the city's former glory. Other old temples in the area are dedicated to the deities Rishabhanatha, Sambhavanatha, Hinglaj Mata, Chamunda, and Shiva.

== See also ==
- History of Jaisalmer
- Bada Bagh
