= Bhaniyana =

Bhaniyana Bhiniyana
- village
- Location in Rajasthan, India Bhaniyana (India)
- Coordinates: 26.6623°N 71.8890°E
- Country: India
- State: Rajasthan
- District: Jaisalmer
- Taluka: Bhaniyana taluka

Languages Hindi, Rajasthani,
  - Official: Hindi
- Time zone: UTC+5:30 (IST)
- PIN: 345024
- ISO 3166 code: RJ-IN
- Nearest city: Pokaran
- Lok Sabha constituency: Jodhpur
- Vidhan Sabha constituency: Pokaran

Bhaniyana is a village and tehsil headquarters of Bhaniyana tehsil in Jaisalmer district in Rajasthan, India. It is situated 36 km away from sub-district headquarter Pokaran and 146 km away from district headquarter Jaisalmer. As per 2009 stats, Bhaniyana village is also a gram panchayat.

== Demographics ==
Bhaniyana Village Total population is 943 and number of houses are 155. Female Population is 47.1%. Village literacy rate is 50.1% and the Female Literacy rate is 17.3%.
