= Jaisalmer Formation =

Geologic formation in India

- Stratigraphic range: Middle-Late Jurassic, Bajocian–Oxfordian
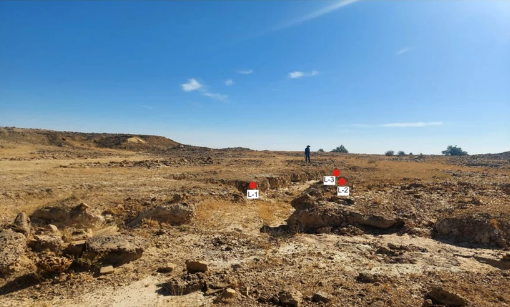
- An outcrop of the Jaisalmer Formation which is the type locality for Tharosaurus indicus. Photographed between 2019-21.
- Type: Geological formation
- Sub-units: Badabag Member, Fort Member, Hamira Member, Jajiya Member, Joyan Member, Kuldhar Member
- Underlies: Baisakhi Formation
- Overlies: Lathi Formation
- Thickness: Variable, typically 120–170 km (75–106 mi)

Lithology
- Primary: Siltstone, sandstone
- Other: Limestone

Location
- Coordinates: 26.911661°N 70.922928°E
- Country: India
- Extent: Jaisalmer

Type section
- Named for: Jaisalmer, India
- Named by: Richard Dixon Oldham
- Year defined: 1886

The Jaisalmer Formation is a Middle to Late Jurassic-aged geologic formation located in India near the city of Jaisalmer that consists mainly of marine deposits. The formation was first identified and defined by geologist Richard Dixon Oldham in 1886.

Dinosaur remains are among the known fossils recovered from this formation.

Strophodus jaisalmerensis, a hybodont, was named after this formation and the Jaisalmer District where its holotype was found.

== Sub-units ==
The Badabag, Fort, Joyan and Hamira members represent the Middle Jurassic Bajocian and Bathonian stages, while the Jajiya and Kuldhar members represent the Middle Jurassic Callovian and the Late Jurassic Oxfordian stages.

The Fort Member is the most extensively studied and consists of fine to medium grain sandstones and oolitic limestones. The Badabag Member consists of intraformational conglomerate and is fossil bearing.

== Paleoenvironment ==
The Jaisalmer district of India is a landlocked district in the state of Rajasthan. However, during the Middle Jurassic, the Jaisalmer Formation was located on the Tethyan coast of Gondwanan India. A marine paleoenvironment is supported by the presence of Hybodont sharks. The Kuldhar Member Limestone contained carbonate microfacies that also indicate a depositional environment composed mainly of lagoons, shoals and open marine environments.

== Paleofauna ==
| Color key: Taxon / Reclassified taxon / Taxon falsely reported as present / Dubious taxon or junior synonym / Ichnotaxon / Ootaxon / Morphotaxon | Notes; Uncertain or tentative taxa are in small text; ~~crossed out~~ taxa are discredited. |

=== Dinosaurs ===
==== Sauropods ====
Sauropods of the Jaisalmer Formation
| Genus | Species | Locality | Material | Notes | Photos |
|---|---|---|---|---|---|
| Turiasauria indet. | Indeterminate | Chandoo Village quarry | Fragmentary tooth | A turiasaur | |
| Tharosaurus | T. indicus | Jethwai Village | RWR-241 (A–K), partial cervical, dorsal, and caudal vertebrae and a dorsal rib | A potentially dubious eusauropod | |

==== Theropods ====
Theropods of the Jaisalmer Formation
| Genus | Species | Locality | Material | Notes | Photos |
|---|---|---|---|---|---|
| Spinosauridae indet. | Indeterminate | Chandoo Village quarry | RAJ/JAIS/CVQS002, pedal ungual phalanx | Possibly the oldest spinosaurid | |
| Averostra indet. | Indeterminate | Chandoo Village quarry | RAJ/JAIS/JWGQ001, an isolated tooth. | A possible allosauroid, ceratosaur, or non-spinosaurid megalosauroid | |

=== Other reptiles ===
Other reptiles of the Jaisalmer Formation
| Genus | Species | Locality | Material | Notes | Photos |
|---|---|---|---|---|---|
| Cf. Teleosaurus | Cf. T. cadomensis | Chandoo Village quarry | RAJ/JAIS/015, a single isolated osteoderm of 6 cm in length and 5.5 cm in width, the osteoderm has randomly arranged and separated elliptical pits. | A teleosaurid thalattosuchian | |
| Plesiosauria | Indeterminate | Chandoo Village quarry | RAJ/JAIS/009-010, two teeth that are single-cusped, lingually curved and slender, they're similar to the gracile teeth of Cryptoclidus. | A plesiosaur. Described as a plesiosaurid but the teeth are similar to Cryptoclidus, a cryptoclidid | |
| Teleosauridae | Indeterminate | Chandoo Village quarry | RAJ/JAIS/002, a tooth that is robust, conical and single-cusped | An indeterminate teleosaurid | |
| Machimosauridae | Indeterminate | Chandoo Village quarry | RAJ/JAIS/005, a single tooth that is large, single cusped and conical. | A indeterminate machimosaurid | |
| Metriorhynchoidea | Indeterminate | Chandoo Village quarry | RAJ/JAIS/006, a single moderately largest tooth that is lingually curved and mediolateral compressed. | A indeterminate metriorhynchoid | |

=== Fish ===
Fishes of the Jaisalmer Formation
| Genus | Species | Locality | Material | Notes | Photos |
|---|---|---|---|---|---|
| Hybodontiformes indet. | Indeterminate | | | | |
| Strophodus | S. jaisalmerensis | Jethwai village | Teeth | A hybodont shark | |
| Strophodus | S. indicus | Chandoo Village quarry | Teeth | A hybodont shark | |
| Strophodus | S. magnus | Chandoo Village quarry | Teeth | A hybodont shark | |
| Strophodus | S. medius | Chandoo Village quarry | Teeth | A hybodont shark | |
| Planohybodus | P. aff. grossiconus | Chandoo Village quarry | Teeth | A hybodont shark | |
| Osteichthyes indet. | Indeterminate | Chandoo Village quarry | Teeth and scale | Found along with an averostran tooth | |
| Eomesodon | E. sp. | Jethwai Village | Prearticular dental plate and isolated teeth | Oldest east gondwanan pycnodont | |

=== Crustaceans ===
Crustaceans of the Jaisalmer Formation
| Genus | Species | Locality | Material | Notes | Photos |
|---|---|---|---|---|---|
| Cytherella | C. indica | | | | |
| Micropneumatocythere | M. joyanensis | | | | |
| Progonocythere | P. khoslai | | | | |
| Trichordis | T. minuta | | | | |

=== Ichnofossils ===
- ?Bichordites sp. – Ichnofossils
- Planolites sp. – Ichnofossils
- Rhizocorallium irregulare – Ichnofossils
- Rhizocorallium jenense – Ichnofossils
- Taenidium serpentinum – Ichnofossils
- Thalassinoides sp. – Ichnofossils
