= Raseshwari Rajya Laxmi =

Maharani of Jaisalmer

- Spouse: Brijraj Singh
- Issue: Chaitanya Raj Singh; Janmejaya Raj Singh
- House: Bhati
- Father: Sahadev Shumsher Jung Bahadur Rana of Nepal,
- Religion: Hinduism

Raseshwari Rajya Laxmi is the widow of Brijraj Singh, a descendant of the former Maharawal of Jaisalmer. She has two sons, Chaitanya Raj Singh Bhati (born 24 December 1993) and Janmajeya Singh Bhati (born 19 December 2000).

== Causes ==
She has spoken for female empowerment, as well as against female infanticide and child marriage. One of her initiatives includes collaborating with an American NGO, Chithra, to open a girls-only school only for girls and a center for women's empowerment.

== Politics ==
She took part in the 2018 Rajasthan Assembly Elections, campaigning from her home in Jaisalmer.
