= Paliwal =

Paliwal is an Indian toponymic surname from Pali, Rajasthan.

== Notables ==
- Dinesh Paliwal (born 1957), Indian businessman
- Ila Paliwal, Indian musician
- Madan Paliwal (born 1959), Indian business magnate, investor, and philanthropist
- Pramod Paliwal (born 1968), Indian author and professor
- Rajat Paliwal (born 1991), Indian cricketer
- Srikrishna Dutt Paliwal (1898–1968), Indian politician
- Shivani Paliwal (born 2002), Indian pop singer
- Shyam Sunder Paliwal (born 1964), Indian social activist
- Suraj Paliwal (born 1951), Indian professor and author
- Tika Ram Paliwal (1909–1995), Indian politician
