= Brijraj Singh Bhati =

Maharawal of Jaisalmer from 1982 to 2020

Brijraj Singh
- Born: 13 November 1968
- Died: 28 November 2020 (aged 52); Delhi, India
- Spouse: Raseshwari Rajya Laxmi (m. 1993)
- Children: Chaitanya Raj Singh
- Father: Raghunath Singh

Brijraj Singh (also spelled Brij Raj Singh; 13 November 1968 – 28 December 2020) was a descendant of the erstwhile royal family of Jaisalmer and head of the Bhati clan of Rajputs from 28 February 1982 until his death in 2020.

== Early life, family, and education ==
Singh was born on 13 November 1968 to Raghunath Singh, the last Maharawal of Jaisalmer, and his wife, Mukut Rajya Lakshmi Devi, a granddaughter of Mohan Shumsher Jung Bahadur Rana. He married Raseshwari Rajya Laxmi, a daughter of Sahadev Shumsher Jung Bahadur Rana and great-granddaughter of Bir Shumsher Jung Bahadur Rana, on 28 January 1993 They had two children: Chaitanya Raj Singh and Janmajeya Singh.

== Unofficial installation ==
Singh was immediately unofficially installed as his father's successor upon the latter's death on 28

February 1982. His so-called "coronation" was held on 13 March 1982. However, the title Maharawal holds on legal merit or holding, as long preceding his coronation the twenty-sixth amendment to the Constitution of India abolished the formal recognition of royal titles, privileges, and associated entitlements previously granted to the rulers of princely states. The ratification of the 26th amendment stripped his father of his titles and privileges too, relegating him to common citizenry like his fellow countrymen.

== Career ==
He was a convener of INTACH. He had restored many monuments and palaces of historical importance and antiquity inside Jaisalmer Fort and made them open to the public. He headed a number of trusts, such as Gridhar Samark Trust and Jaisalmer Heritage Trusts. Through these, he did a lot of welfare work to support the people of Jaisalmer and to encourage the education of girls.

== Death ==
Singh died on 28 December 2020 at Medanta Hospital in Delhi. He was undergoing liver treatment. His eldest son, Chaitanya Raj Singh, succeeded him as head of the family.
