= Pramod Paliwal =

Academician and Author

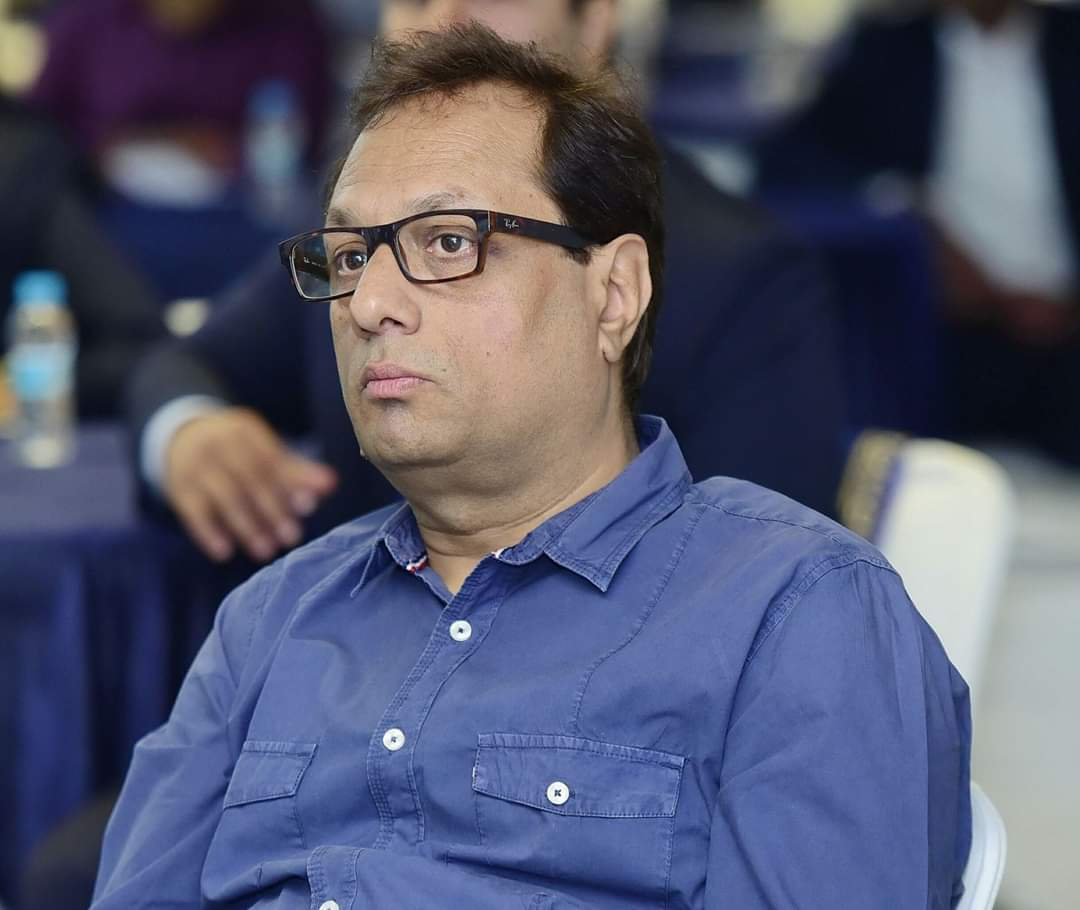
- Dr. Pramod Paliwal
- Born: Pramod Paliwal; 1968 (age 57–58); Udaipur, Rajasthan, India
- Occupation: Professor
- Awards: Fellow, CIM (The Chartered Institute of Marketing), U.K.

Academic background
- Education: MBA, PhD
- Alma mater: Mohanlal Sukhadia University

Academic work
- Discipline: Management; Energy sector Marketing
- Institutions: Pandit Deendayal Energy University
- Main interests: Natural gas Sustainable Marketing; Energy Consumption Behavior

Pramod Paliwal (born 1968) is an author, academician, expert in Energy Sector Management and Energy Security. He is a Fellow of The Chartered Institute of Marketing, U.K. and is on the panel of Chair of Indian Studies Abroad in Energy Studies at Indian Council for Cultural Relations (ICCR), Ministry of External Affairs, Govt. of India. Paliwal is associated with the international crowdsourcing organization Wikistrat as an Honorary Senior Analyst in the area of energy. He has an interest in Natural Gas Distribution industry and Energy Branding.

== Education and personal life ==
Born in Udaipur, Paliwal holds a bachelor's degree in Economics from Rajasthan Vidyapeeth and is an MBA followed by a PhD in Management from Mohanlal Sukhadia University.

He is married and has two children.

== Career, publications and conferences ==
Paliwal is a professor at the School of Management, Pandit Deendayal Energy University, Gandhinagar-Gujarat, India. In profession since 1991, his earlier associations have been with ACC Limited (now, a subsidiary of the Adani Group; formerly Holcim Group), Pacific Institute of Management, Mohanlal Sukhadia University, India, and the India Offshore Campus of Oxford Brookes University, U.K. He sits on the Academic Advisory Board of CHARGE Energy Branding Conference, Iceland.

Paliwal contributed to "International Gas Union 2009–2012 Triennium Work Report: Building Strategic Human Capital" authored by Ieda Gomes, United Kingdom. He also contributed to the study "Promoting Energy Savings in India's Transportation Sector" with the Institute of Energy Economics Japan (IEEJ), Tokyo and METI (Ministry of Economy, Trade and Industry). (2014–15) He sits on advisory councils of higher education institutions and regulatory bodies.

Apart from publishing many research papers and book chapters in Management, Marketing, Energy Industry and Technology, he has authored books on B2B Marketing and Natural Gas Distribution. These include McGraw-Hill International ‘Cases in Business Marketing’ (with co-authors Ramendra Singh and Sudhir Yadav), ‘Natural Gas Transmission and Distribution Business’ by Routledge (with co-author Sudhir Yadav) and its special Indian edition (with co-author Sudhir Yadav) and, ‘Managing Petrochemicals Business’ by Routledge (with co-authors Sonal Yadav and Sudhir Yadav). He has authored the copyrighted DIAMOND Model - a structured method for Case Study Analysis in Management Education.

Dr. Paliwal has contributed with expert lectures on the energy sector and higher education in India and abroad.
