= Chaitanya Raj Singh =

Maharawal of Jaisalmer since 2020

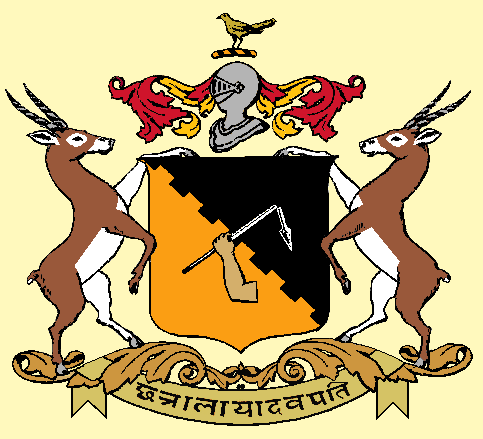
- Princely arms of the Princes of Jaisalmer
- Born: 24 December 1993 (age 32)
- Father: Brijraj Singh
- Mother: Raseshwari Rajya Laxmi

Chaitanya Raj Singh (born 24 December 1993) is the head of the Bhati clan, an erstwhile ruling dynasty of Jaisalmer.

== Early life, family, and education ==
Singh was born on 24 December 1993 as the first child of Brijraj Singh and his wife, Raseshwari Rajya Laxmi. His mother is a descendant of Bir Shumsher Jung Bahadur Rana. He first studied at New Delhi's Sanskriti School and then went to SOAS University of London to study politics.

== Career ==
He is the founder of Everest Eco Hemp Pvt. Ltd., director of Polstrat Communications Pvt. Ltd., and director of Citta Education Foundation India. He is also Chairman of the Girdhar Smark Dharmath Nyas Trust, which runs the Jaisalmer Fort Palace Museum. He is actively involved in promoting sustainable development, heritage restoration, education, and water conservation in Jaisalmer.

== Succession ==
Singh succeeded his father on 28 December 2020. Traditionally, the Maharawal, a title held by his forefathers, is also regarded as the head of the Bhati clan of Rajputs. A ceremony "installing" him was held on 15 January 2021 at Jaisalmer Fort. It was attended by descendants of various erstwhile royal families and other people in attendance estimated to be 25,000–30,000. Afterwards, he went in a procession throughout the city of Jaisalmer in an open jeep with a cavalcade of horses, camels and a band.

His self-styled title holds no official status or recognition under Indian law. The twenty-sixth amendment to the Constitution of India abolished the formal recognition of royal titles, privileges, and associated entitlements previously granted to the rulers of princely states.

== Engagements ==
On 30 August 2025, the cities of Jaisalmer and Carcassonne in Occitania, France, entered into a twinning agreement. He attended the signing of the agreement and was made honorary citizen of Carcassonne. On 5 August 2026, he requested the NCERT to remove a factually incorrect map in the Social Science textbook for Class 8 (Unit 3, page 71) that depicted Jaisalmer as part of the then Maratha Empire. Following critical reception from various quarters, NCERT eventually expunged the controversial map.
