= Lathi Formation =

Geologic formation in India

- Stratigraphic range: Early Jurassic to Middle Jurassic, 201.3–168.3 Ma
- Type: Geological formation
- Underlies: Jaisalmer Formation
- Overlies: N/A

Location
- Coordinates: 26.9° N, 70.9° E
- Region: Rajasthan
- Country: India
- Lathi Formation (India)

The Lathi Formation is a Mesozoic geologic formation in India. Dinosaur remains are among the fossils that have been recovered from the formation.

== Paleobiota ==
Color key: Taxon / Reclassified taxon / Taxon falsely reported as present / Dubious taxon or junior synonym / Ichnotaxon / Ootaxon / Morphotaxon	Notes; Uncertain or tentative taxa are in small text; ~~crossed out~~ taxa are discredited.

=== Dinosaurs ===
Genus	Species	Location	Stratigraphic position	Material	Notes	Images
Dinosauria	indeterminate			A few pieces of long bones that might have transverse diameter between 7-12 cm and some flat bones that appears to be similar to scutes, the larger one is 15 cm across and 2 cm thick and has regular marking which are similar to sutures lines of scutes.	A Dinosaur.	
Eubrontes	E. giganteus			Footprints	A Theropod footprints.	
Eubrontes	E. glenrosensis			Footprints	A Theropod footprints.	
Grallator	G. tenuis			Footprints	A Theropod footprints.	

=== Pterosaurs ===
Genus	Species	Location	Stratigraphic position	Material	Notes	Images
Pterosauria?	indeterminate			"fragments of pterosaur bones"	A fragmentary pterosaur.	

=== Crocodyliforms ===
Genus	Species	Location	Stratigraphic position	Material	Notes	Images
Pseudosuchia	indeterminate			"vertebra"		

=== Mollusca ===
Genus	Species	Location	Stratigraphic position	Material	Notes	Images
Indocorbula	sp.				A Clam.	
Nerineidae	indeterminate				A Gastropod.	
Trigonia	sp.				A Clam.	

=== Flora ===
Genus	Species	Location	Stratigraphic position	Material	Notes	Images
Pterophyllum	sp.				A Bennettitales plant.	
Ptilophyllum	P. acutifolium				A Bennettitales plant.	
Equisetites	sp.				An Equisetaceae plant.	
