= Akal Wood Fossil Park =

National geological monument in Jaisalmer, India

- Location within Rajasthan
- Type: Fossil park
- Location: Akal, Jaisalmer district, Rajasthan, India
- Nearest city: Jaisalmer
- Coordinates: 26°49′30″N 71°02′24″E
- Area: 21 ha (52 acres)
- Elevation: 247.6 m (812 ft)

National Geological Monuments of India
- Official name: Akal Wood Fossil Park
- Designated: 1972
- Designated by: Geological Survey of India

Akal Wood Fossil Park is a protected paleontological site in Jaisalmer district, Rajasthan. It is a declared Biodiversity Heritage Site and National Geological Monument. The park is spread over approximately 21 ha (52 acres) and preserves petrified trees and plant fossils dating to 180 Ma.

== Geography ==
The protected paleontological site, spread over 21 ha (52 acres), is located on a barren hillside, about 18 km (11 mi) southeast of Jaisalmer in Jaisalmer district, Rajasthan. The park forms part of Jaisalmer's fossil belt, a region which has yielded several fossils including that of dinosaurs, and sharks.

== Administration ==
The park was declared as a National Geological Monument by the Geological Society of India in 1972. It was administered and maintained by the Geological Society of India till 1985, when it was handed over to the Forest Department of Government of Rajasthan. The park is maintained by the authorities of the Desert National Park. The state government had developed the park into a geotourism site.

== Fossils ==
The Akal Wood Fossil Park contains about a dozen fossilised wooden logs and petrified tree trunks lying horizontally in random orientations. The longest preserved tree trunk measures 13.4 m (44 ft) long and 0.9 m (2 ft 11 in) wide. The fossil assemblage includes Pterophyllum, Ptilophyllum, Equisetites species, dicotyledonous wood and gastropod shells, along with other invertebrate remains such as ammonites. Most of the fossilised logs are protected with iron-grill cages and metal-sheet roofing.

== Geology ==
The fossils occur in the Lathi Formation of Lower Jurassic age, dating to about 180 Ma. The petrified wood indicate that the trees were once part of lush green forests thriving in a warm, and humid environment. The presence of gastropod remains indicate a nearby marine ecosystem. The rapid burial of the organic remains in sediments of the then-existing sea facilitated their preservation, and the organic remains were replaced by silica, preserving the life forms.

== See also ==
- National Fossil Wood Park, Tiruvakkarai
- National Fossil Wood Park, Sathanur
- Rajmahal hills
- Shivalik Fossil Park
