= Desert National Park =

National park in Rajasthan, India

- IUCN category II (national park)
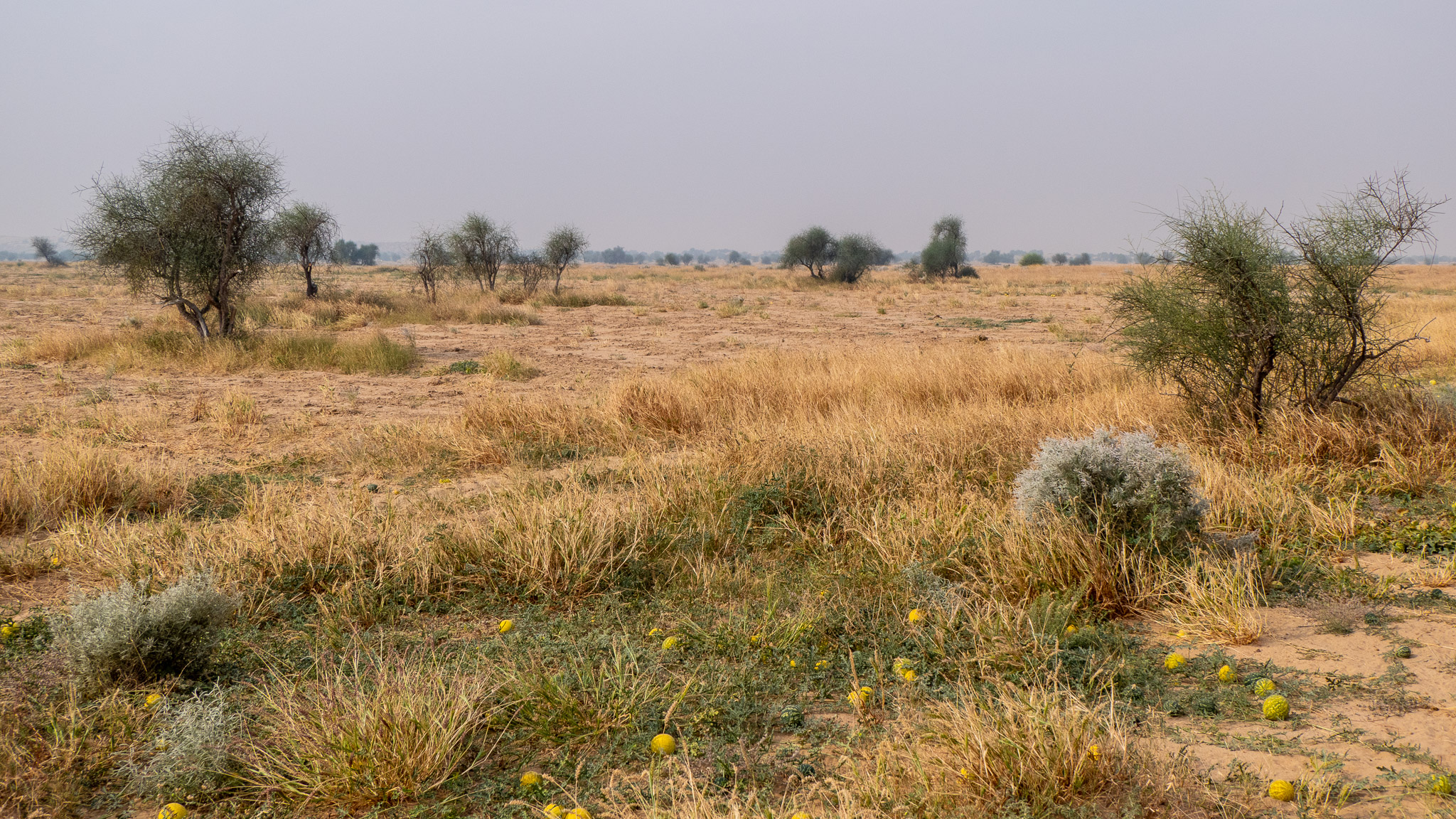

- Location within Rajasthan Location within India
- Interactive map of Desert National Park
- Nearest city: Jaisalmer, Barmer
- Coordinates: 26°N 70.5°E
- Area: 3,162 km^{2} (1,221 sq mi)
- Established: 1981

Desert National Park is a national park in the Indian state of Rajasthan, near the towns of Jaisalmer and Barmer. It is one of the largest national parks, covering an area of 3,162 km^{2} (1,221 sq mi) in the Thar Desert. Sand dunes form around 44% of the park. The major landform consists of craggy rocks and compact salt lake bottoms, intermediate areas and fixed dunes. It was gazetted in 1980.

Despite a fragile ecosystem, it harbours an abundance of birdlife, both migratory and resident birds, including short-toed eagle, tawny eagle, spotted eagle, laggar falcon, kestrel, sand grouse and great Indian bustard. Desert National Park has a collection of fossils of animals and plants which are 180 million years old. Some fossils of dinosaurs which are 65-66 million years old were found in the area.

== Geography and location ==
Desert National Park covers an area of 3,162 km^{2} (1,221 sq mi), of which 1,900 km^{2} (730 sq mi) is in Jaisalmer district and the remaining 1,262 km^{2} (487 sq mi) in Barmer district of Rajasthan. It mostly consists of sand dunes (44%), but also has pediments, pavements and structural plains. Fossils from the Jurassic Period were found inside the park.

== Fauna ==
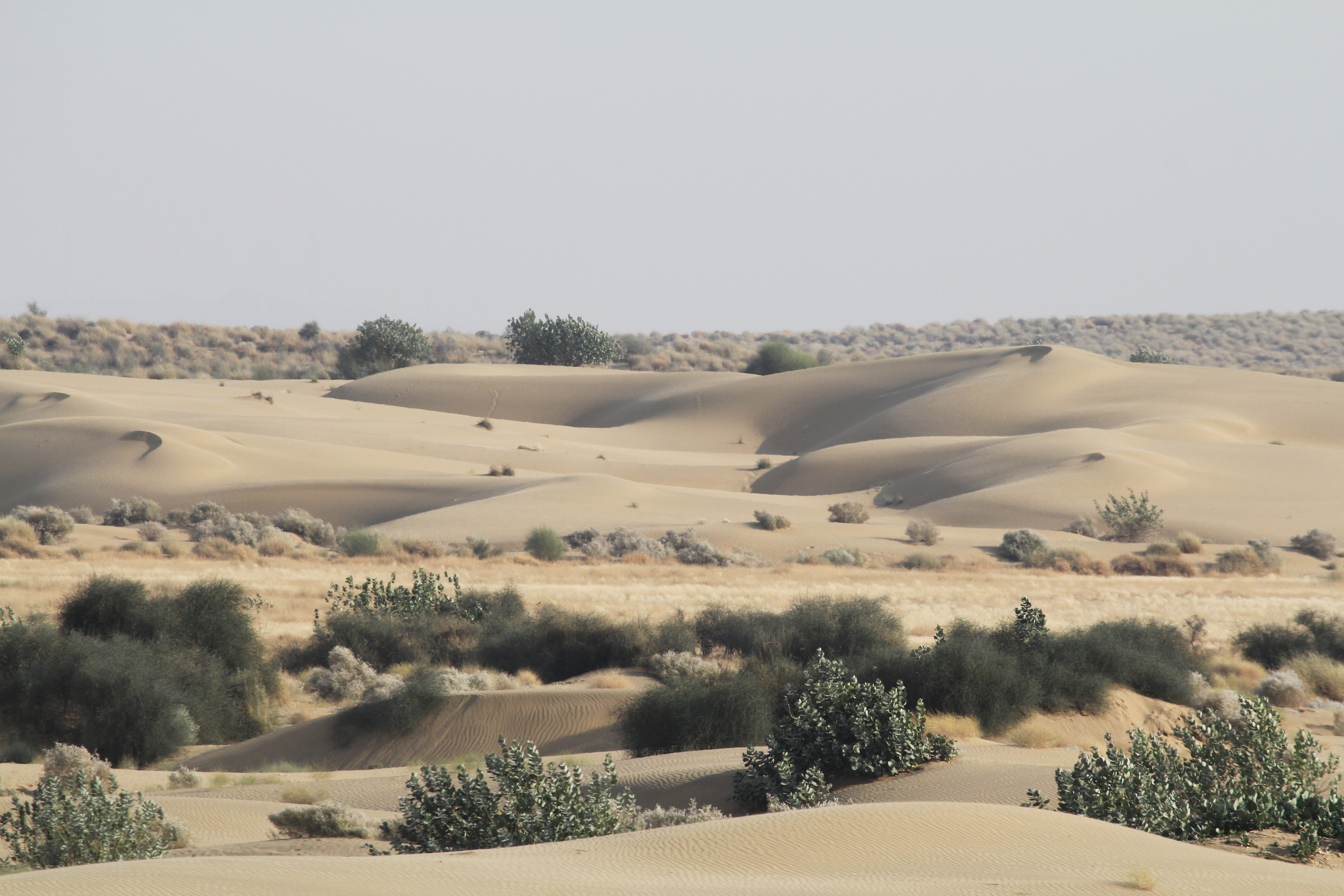
A view of Sams Sand Dunes

A chinkara in the Thar Desert

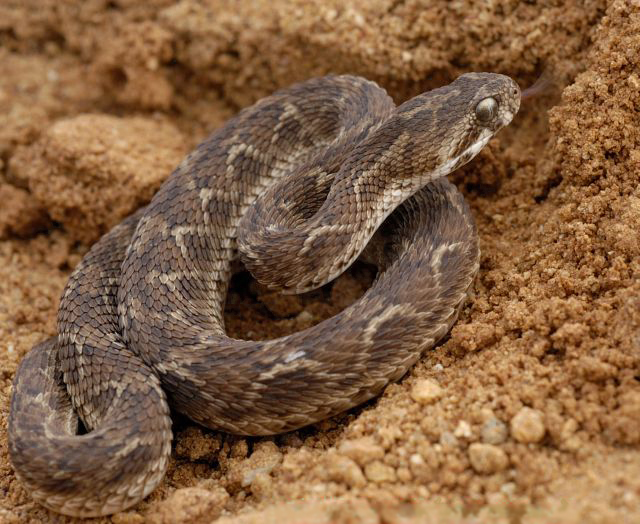
A closeup image of Indian saw-scaled viper.

The chinkara (Gazella bennettii) is a common antelope of this region. The national park also hosts Indian wolf, Indian desert jird, Indian gerbil, long-eared hedgehog, small Indian mongoose, desert hare and Asiatic wildcat.

Reptiles: Sind gecko, Sindh awl-headed snake, Whip-snake, spiny-tailed lizard, monitor lizard, saw-scaled viper, Russell's viper, Red-spotted royal snake, common krait.

Avifauna: sandgrouse, Indian bustard, partridges, bee-eaters, larks and shrikes are year-round residents, while demoiselle crane and houbara bustard arrive in winter. Raptors include tawny and steppe eagles, long-legged and honey buzzards, and falcons. In the winter, the birdlife is augmented by species such as the demoiselle crane and MacQueen's bustard.

== Flora ==
Habitats that are found in the park include open grassland, thorny bushes, and dunes. 168 plant species have been recorded in the park. Some species of trees that inhabit the park include Tecomella undulata, Moringa concanensis, Helitropium rariflorum, and Ammannie desertorum.

== See also ==
- Arid Forest Research Institute (AFRI)
- Indian Council of Forestry Research and Education
