= Bada Bagh =

Coordinates: 26.955°N 70.887°E

- बड़ा बाग (Hindi)
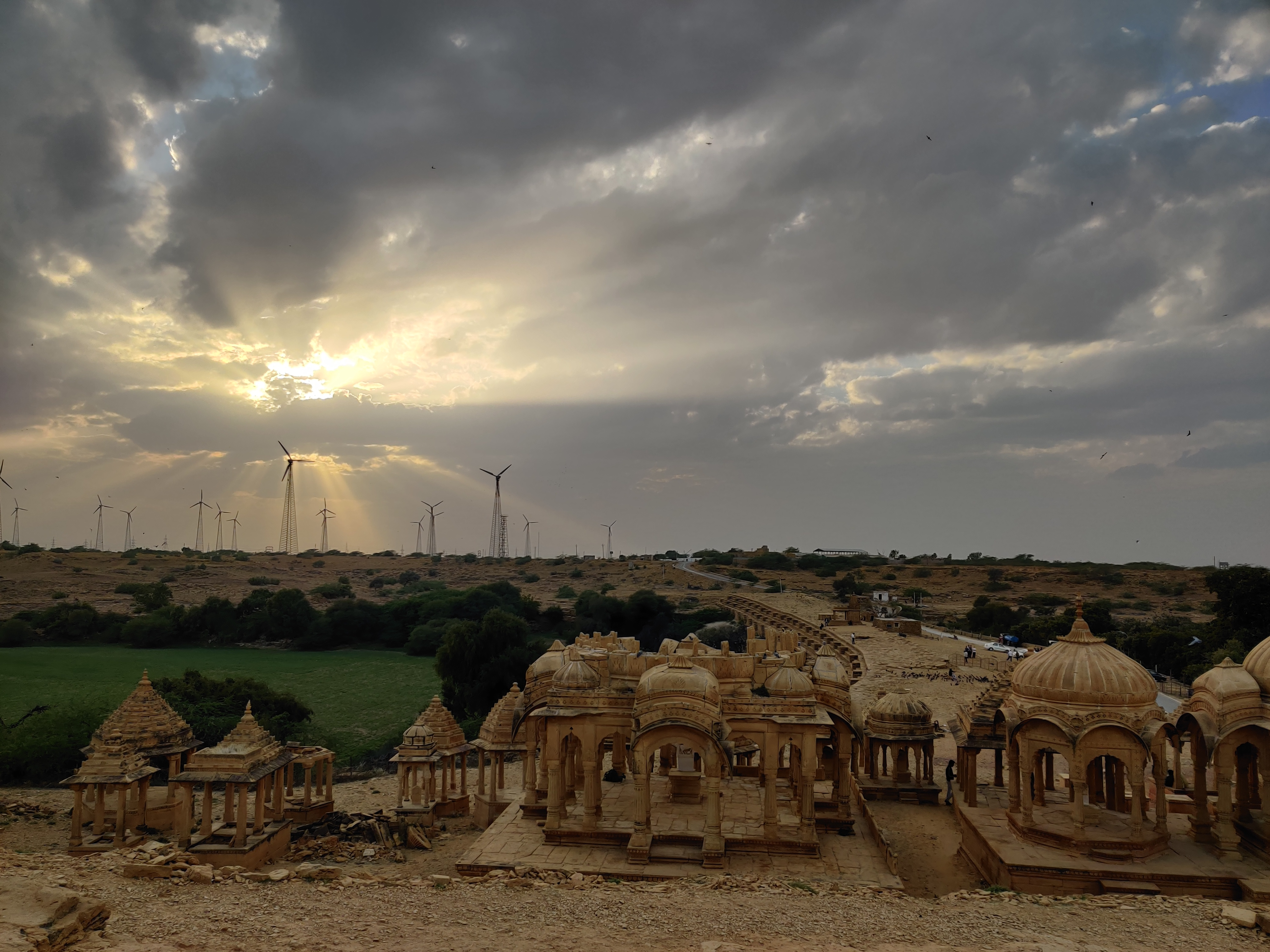
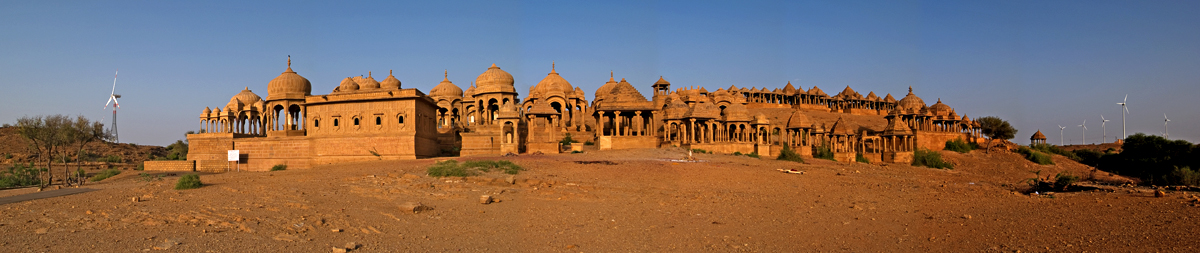
- Top: Chhatris up close at Bada Bagh; Bottom: Bada Bagh panorama
- Type: Garden complex with royal chhatri cenotaphs
- Location: Six kilometers north of Jaisalmer, Rajasthan, India

History
- Built by: Jait Singh II, Lunkaran, Maharawal Jawahir Singh (unfinished chhatri)

Bada Bagh, also called Barabagh (lit. "grand garden" in Hindi) is a garden complex located about six kilometers north of Jaisalmer in the Indian state of Rajasthan. Overlooking a mango plantation sits a set of royal chhatri cenotaphs constructed by the kings of the Jaisalmer State in the 18th, 19th and early 20th centuries CE.

== History ==
A descendant of Maharawal Jaisal Singh, the founder of Jaisalmer State, Jait Singh II (1497–1530), commissioned a dam to create a water tank during his reign in the 16th century CE. This made the desert green in this area.

After Jait Singh II's death, his son Lunkaran (1530-1551) built a beautiful garden by the lake and a memorial chhatri cenotaph on a hill overlooking the lake. Later on, many more cenotaphs were constructed here for Lunkaran and other Bhattis. The last chhatri, meant for Maharawal Jawahir Singh, dates from the 20th century and remains unfinished after Indian independence.

== Description ==
Bada Bagh is situated on a small hill. The memorial chhatri cenotaphs have all been carved out of sandstone blocks, but have been built in at least four different sizes - for the ruling kings, their queens, their princes, and other royal family members. Each cenotaph has a marble slab with inscriptions about the deceased royal and a symbolic image of a man on a horse.
