= Jaisalmer district =

Coordinates: 26°54′48″N 70°54′50″E

- District
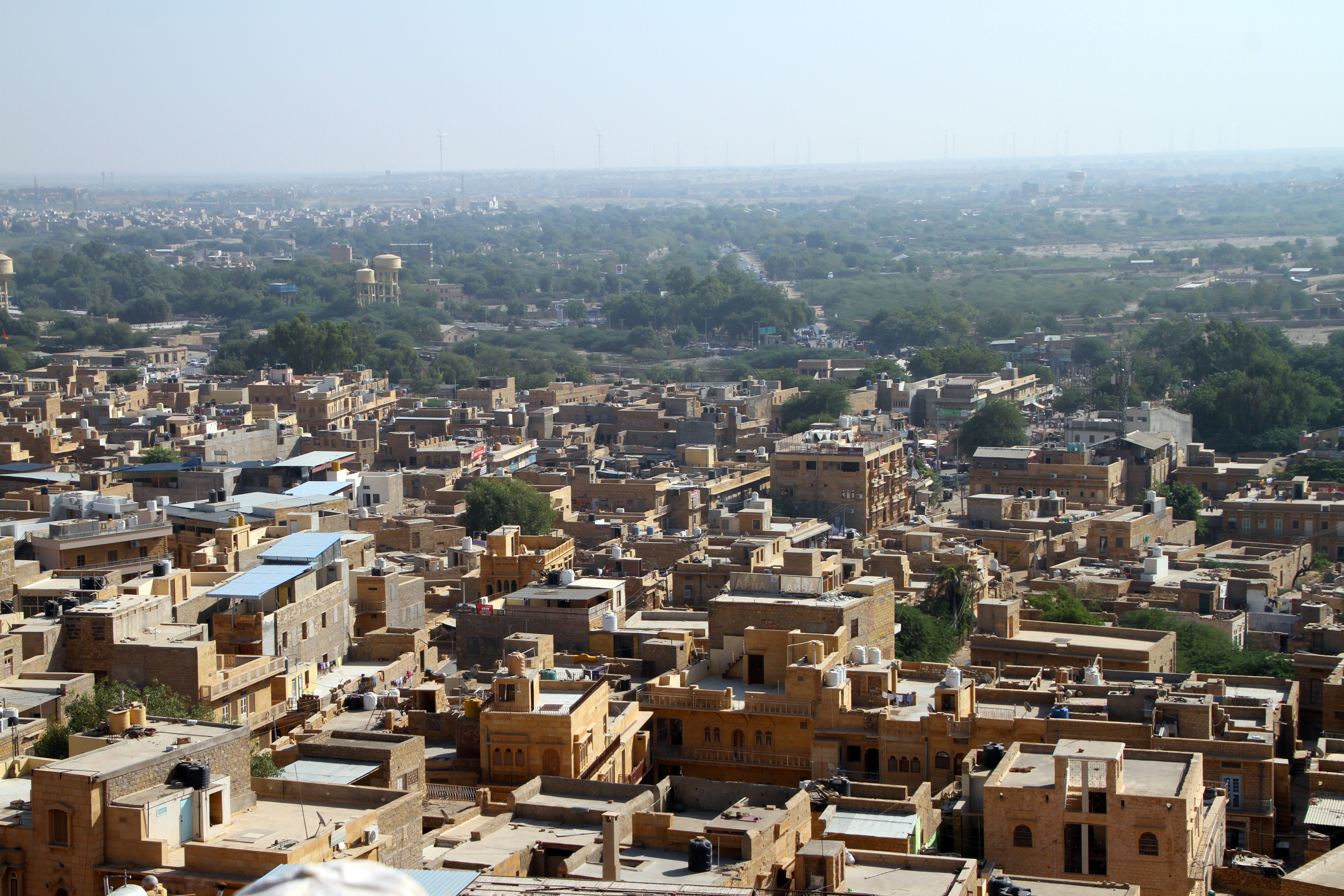
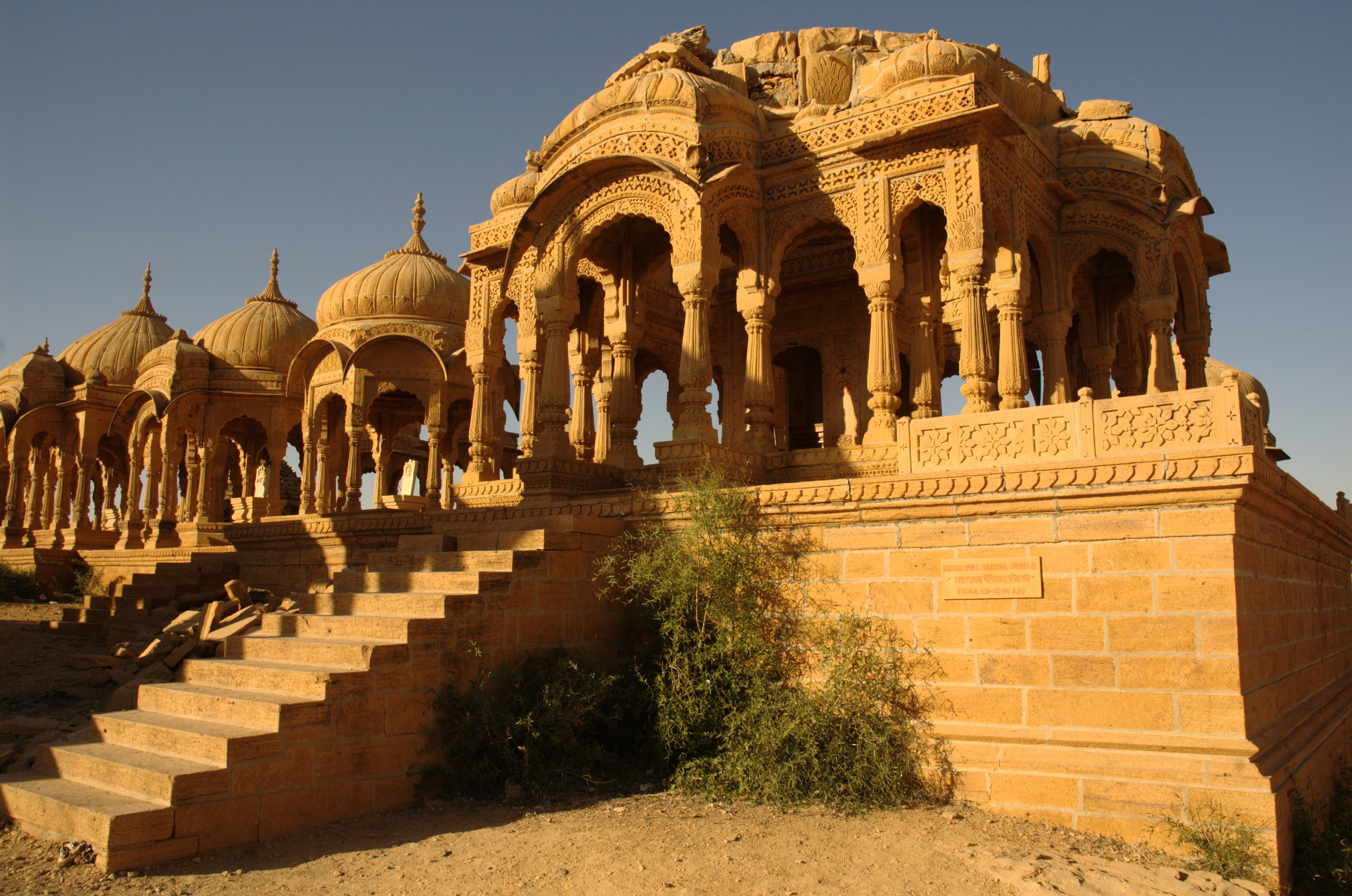
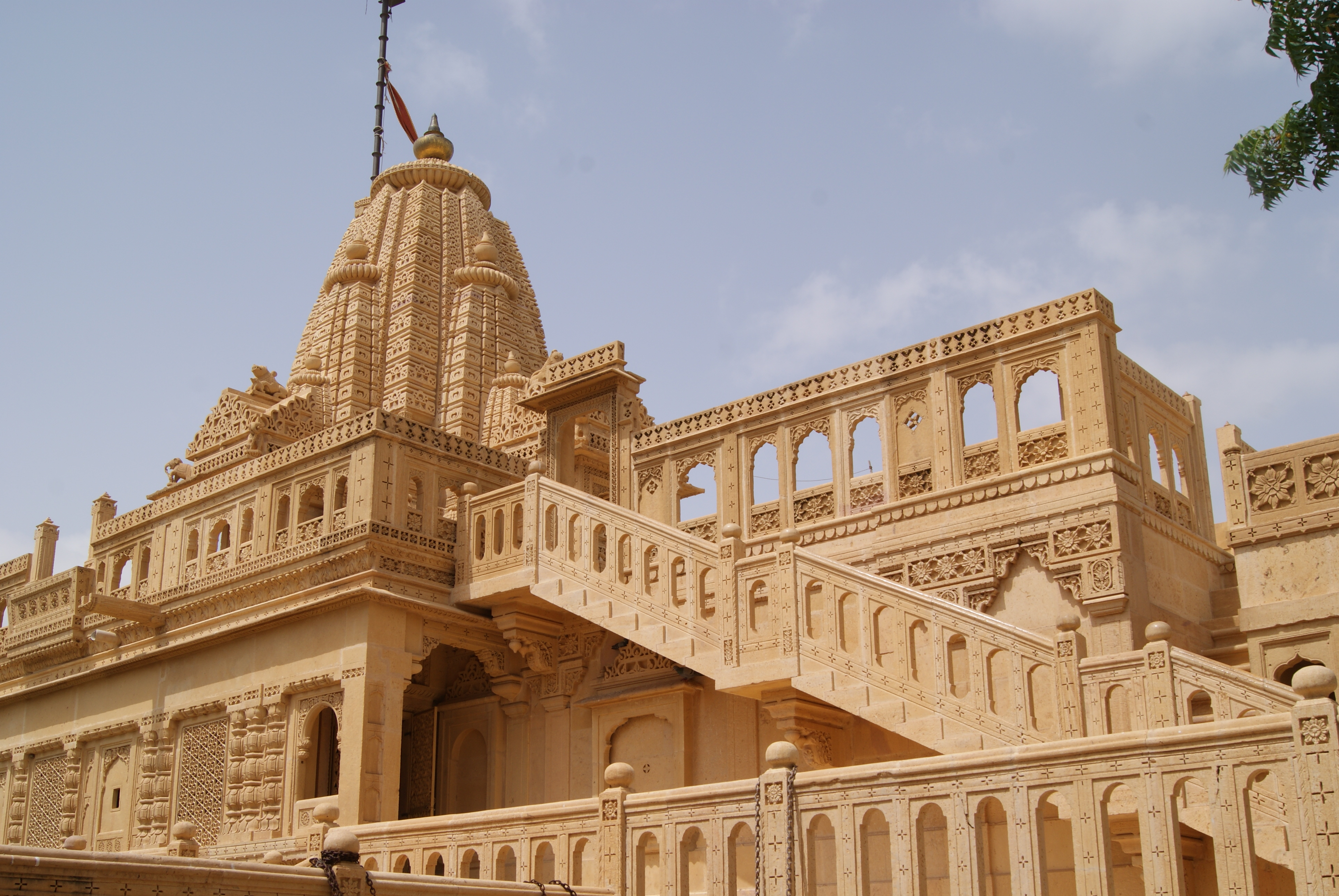
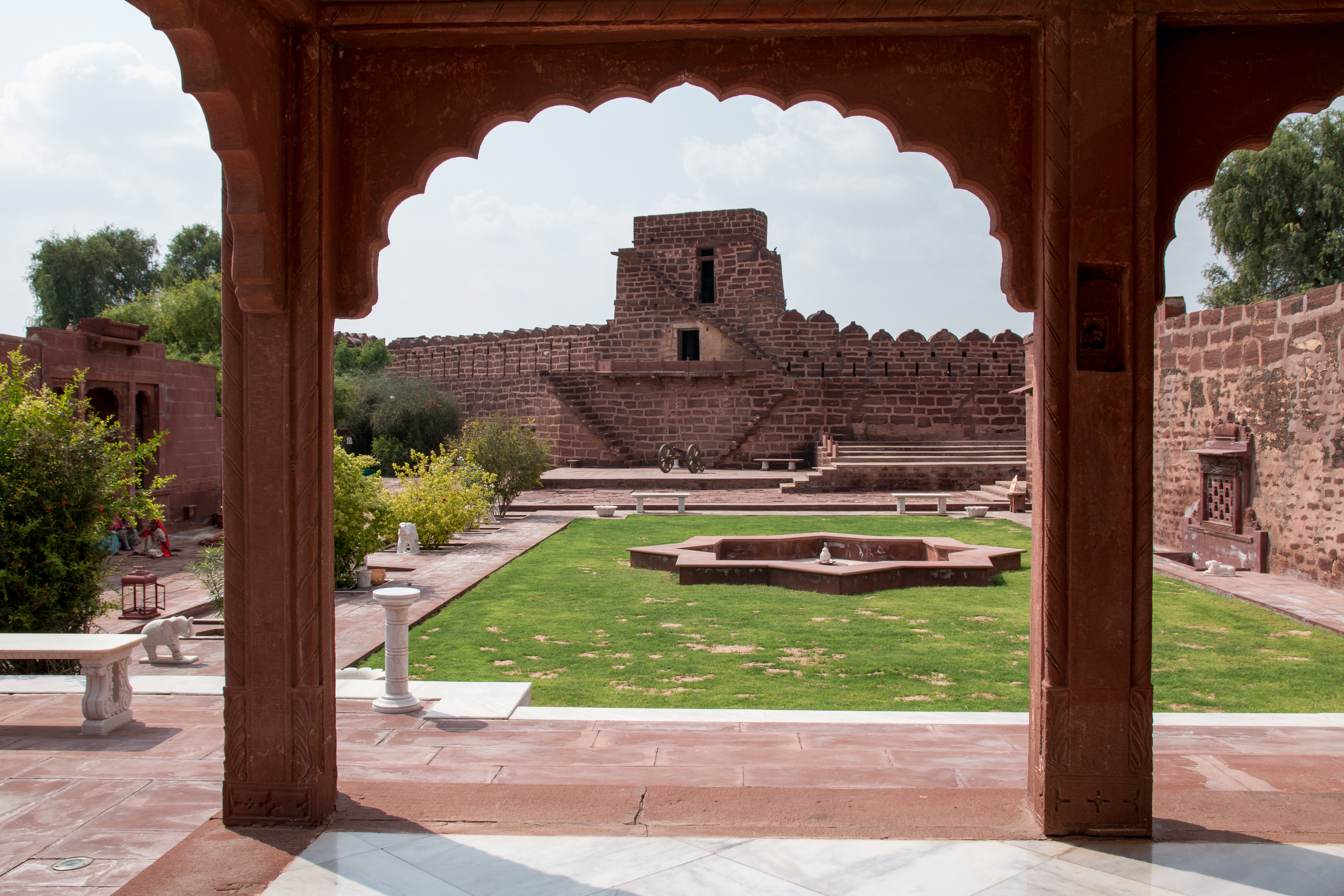
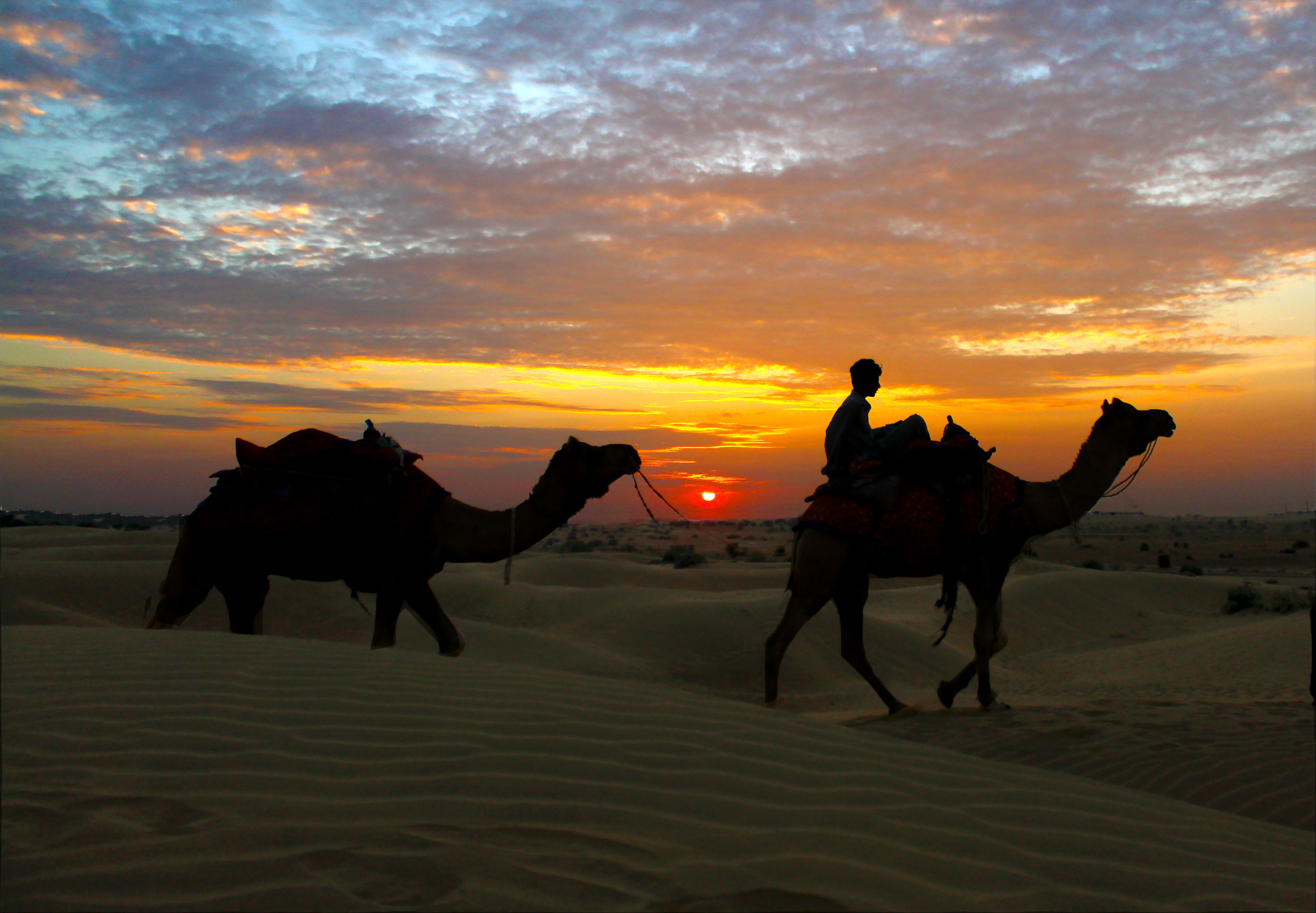
- From top, left to right: Jaisalmer city from Jaisalmer Fort, Bada Bagh, Lodhruva Jain Temple, Watchtower in Pokhran Fort, Sand dunes in the Thar Desert

- Location of Jaisalmer district in Rajasthan
- Country: India
- State: Rajasthan
- Division: Jodhpur
- Headquarters: Jaisalmer

Area
  - Total: 38,401 km^{2} (14,827 sq mi)

Population (2011)
  - Total: 669,919
  - Density: 17.445/km^{2} (45.183/sq mi)
- Time zone: UTC+05:30 (IST)

Jaisalmer district is the largest district in the Indian state of Rajasthan, and the third largest district in India. Located in Marwar (Jodhpur Division), the city of Jaisalmer is the administrative headquarters of the district. It is around 289 km (180 mi) from the city of Jodhpur, and around 559 km (347 mi) from Jaipur, the capital of Rajasthan. As of the 2011 population census, it is the least populous district out of all 50 districts in Rajasthan. Jaisalmer district is located in western part of the state.

== Geography ==
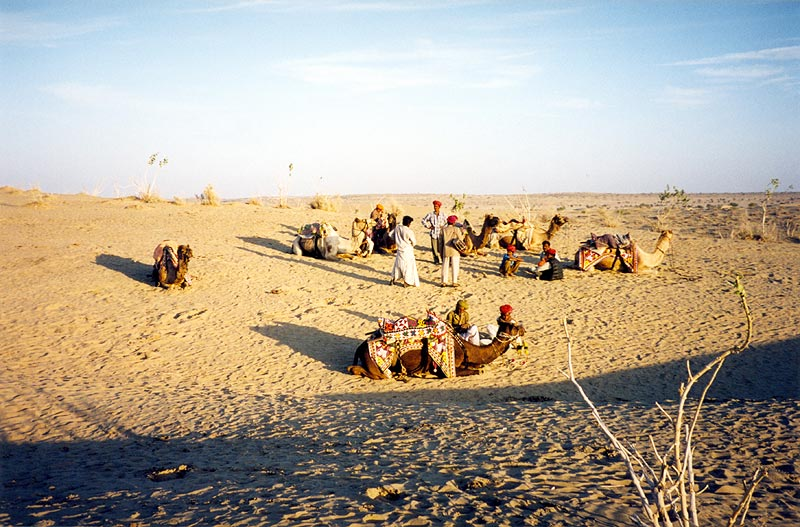
Thar Desert

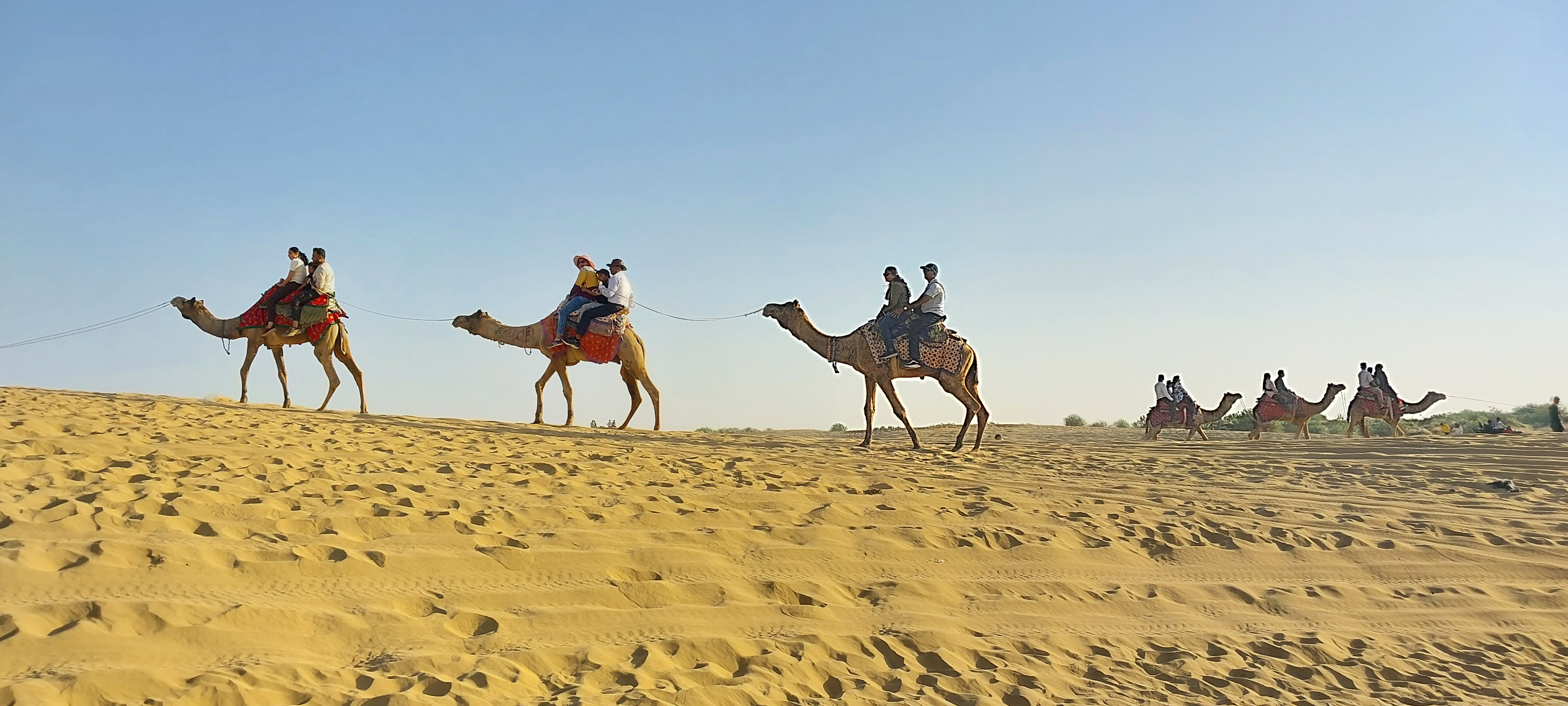
Camel rides in Jaisalmer

With an area of 38,401 square kilometres or 14,827 square miles, Jaisalmer is the largest district in Rajasthan, and the third-largest in the country by area.

The Jaisalmer district lies in the Thar Desert, which straddles the border of India and Pakistan. It is bound in the northeast by Bikaner District, in the east by Jodhpur District, in the south by Barmer District, and in the west and north by Pakistan.

The district is located within a rectangle lying between 26°.4’ –28°.23' north parallel and 69°.20'-72°.42' east meridians.

The international border adjacent to the district is around 464 km (288 mi) long.

Jaisalmer is almost entirely a sandy landscape, forming a part of the great Indian desert. The general aspect of the area is that of an interminable sea of sandhills, of all shapes and sizes, some rising to a height of almost 150 ft (46 m). The hills in the west are covered with log bushes, while those in the east feature tufts of long grass. Water is scarce, and generally brackish; the average depth of the wells is said to be about 250 ft (76 m). There are no perennial streams, and only one small river, the Kakni, which, after flowing a distance of 28 m (92 ft), spreads over a large surface of flat ground and forms a lake called the Bhuj-Jhil. The climate is hot and dry. Throughout Jaisalmer crops such as bajra, jowar, motif, and til, are grown; spring crops of wheat and barley are very rare. Owing to the scant rainfall, irrigation is almost unknown except for small areas irrigated by lift canals of Indira Gandhi Canal Project.

=== Climate ===
The climate is hot arid (Köppen: BWh).

Climate data for Jaisalmer
| Month | Jan | Feb | Mar | Apr | May | Jun | Jul | Aug | Sep | Oct | Nov | Dec | Year |
|---|---|---|---|---|---|---|---|---|---|---|---|---|---|
| Mean daily maximum °C (°F) | 23.7 (74.7) | 27.2 (81.0) | 32.8 (91.0) | 38.4 (101.1) | 48.0 (118.4) | 48.0 (118.4) | 42.8 (109.0) | 36.0 (96.8) | 36.5 (97.7) | 36.1 (97.0) | 31.1 (88.0) | 25.4 (77.7) | 35.5 (95.9) |
| Mean daily minimum °C (°F) | 7.9 (46.2) | 10.9 (51.6) | 16.8 (62.2) | 22.2 (72.0) | 25.7 (78.3) | 27.1 (80.8) | 26.5 (79.7) | 25.4 (77.7) | 24.3 (75.7) | 20.5 (68.9) | 13.8 (56.8) | 8.9 (48.0) | 19.2 (66.5) |
| Average rainfall mm (inches) | 1.3 (0.05) | 4.0 (0.16) | 3.2 (0.13) | 18.1 (0.71) | 9.2 (0.36) | 36.1 (1.42) | 86.1 (3.39) | 109.0 (4.29) | 36.2 (1.43) | 12.5 (0.49) | 1.3 (0.05) | 2.5 (0.10) | 319.5 (12.58) |
| Average rainy days (≥ 0.1 mm) | 0.6 | 1.0 | 0.9 | 0.4 | 0.8 | 2.1 | 4.9 | 5.9 | 3.1 | 0.4 | 1.1 | 0.5 | 21.7 |
Source: WMO

== Paleontology ==
In 2021, a Middle Jurassic hybodont Strophodus jaisalmerensis was named in a reference to this district and the geologic formation of the same name where its holotype was found.

== Economy ==
In 2006, the Ministry of Panchayati Raj named Jaisalmer one of the country's 250 most backward districts (out of a total of 640). It is one of the twelve districts in Rajasthan currently receiving funds from the Backward Regions Grant Fund Programme (BRGF).

== Demographics ==
Historical population
| Year | Pop. | ±% p.a. |
|---|---|---|
| 1901 | 75,551 | — |
| 1911 | 87,162 | +1.44% |
| 1921 | 69,224 | −2.28% |
| 1931 | 78,646 | +1.28% |
| 1941 | 96,958 | +2.12% |
| 1951 | 109,658 | +1.24% |
| 1961 | 141,242 | +2.56% |
| 1971 | 167,824 | +1.74% |
| 1981 | 243,082 | +3.77% |
| 1991 | 344,517 | +3.55% |
| 2001 | 508,247 | +3.96% |
| 2011 | 669,919 | +2.80% |

Religions in Jaisalmer district (2011)
| Religion | Percent |
| Hinduism | 74.19% |
| Islam | 25.10% |
| Other or not stated | 0.71% |

According to the 2011 census, Jaisalmer district has a population of 669,919, roughly equal to the nation of Equatorial Guinea or the US state of North Dakota. This gives it a ranking of 508th in India (out of a total of 640). The district has a population density of 17 inhabitants per square kilometre (44/sq mi). Its population growth rate over the decade 2001–2011 was 32.22%. Jaisalmer has a sex ratio of 849 females for every 1000 males, and a literacy rate of 58.04%. 13.29% of the population lives in urban areas. Scheduled Castes and Scheduled Tribes make up 14.80% and 6.33% of the population respectively.

=== Languages ===
Languages in Jaisalmer district (2011)
1. Rajasthani (51.1%)
2. Marwari (41.0%)
3. Hindi (2.80%)
4. Sindhi (2.56%)
5. Urdu (1.02%)
6. Others (1.60%)

At the time of the 2011 census, 51.07% of the population spoke Rajasthani, 40.95% Marwari, 2.80% Hindi, 2.56% Sindhi and 1.02% Urdu as their first language. Marwari is the local language, while Dhatki and Sindhi is spoken in border areas and by Hindu refugees from nearby Thar regions of Sindh.

== Administration ==
IAS Pratap Singh Nathawat is the District Collector of Jaisalmer District. Jaisalmer district has four sub-divisions: Jaisalmer, Pokaran, Bhaniyana, and Fatehgarh. Jaisalmer and Pokaran are the nagar palikas, while 744 villages come under 140 gram panchayats. District developmental activities are being looked after by three panchayat samities, that is, Jaisalmer, Sam, and Sankra.

== Tourism ==
Jaisalmer is one of the largest tourism districts in Rajasthan. About 276,887 tourists visit the district every year, out of which about 100,000 tourists are foreigners.

Notable sites include:

- Jaisalmer Fort
- Gadsisar Lake
- Tanot Mandir
- Longewala
- Pokharan
- Thar Desert
- Bada Bagh
- Lodhruva
- Akal Wood Fossil Park
- Ramdevra

Every year Maru Mahotsav is celebrated for the tourists. Ramdevra is also a ln attraction for the Baba Ramdevji's pilgrims.

== See also ==
- Rajkumari Ratnavati Girls School, a school in the rural thar desert of Jaisalmer with unique architecture
- Thar Desert
- Tharparkar
