= Chachak Dev II =

15th century Bhati ruler of Jaisalmer

Ruler of Jaisalmer
- Reign: 1448–1462
- Successor: Bairsal
- Born: Unknown
- Died: 1462; Dhuniapur
- Spouse: Lal Kanwar Sodhi; Suraj Kanwar Chauhan; Sonal Devi; Kohari
- Issue: 7 sons, including Bairsal
- Dynasty: Bhati (Rajput)
- Father: Rao Kelana (disputed)

Chachak Dev II (Note: Alternatively referred to as "Chachi", "Chacha", or "Chachag") (r. 1448–1462) was the Bhati ruler of Jaisalmer during a period of conflict along its western and north-western frontiers. His activities are attested by the Chachak Inscription of VS 1518 (1461). Historian Rima Hooja describes him as having been "among the warrior-heroes of his times", while Vishnu Dayal Mathur refers to him as one of the figures who have "become legends in the historic land" of Jaisalmer.

== Biography ==
Chachak Dev II was a ruler of the Bhati dynasty who succeeded to the throne of Jaisalmer in 1448. Historical accounts differ regarding his parentage: Rajvi Amar Singh identifies him as the eldest son of Rao Kelana of Pugal, while J. N. Singh Yadav gives his father as Vairsal.

According to Wolseley Haig, Chachak resided at Marot to defend his territories against raids from Multan. The annals of Jaisalmer credit him with victories over the rulers of Multan and over the Dhundis, Rathors, and Khokhars of the Punjab, but Haig cautions that the annals are an "untrustworthy guide" for this period and the only authority for Chachak's exploits.

James Tod gives a more detailed account of Chachak's reign, describing campaigns against forces from Multan and allied tribes, the establishment of a station at Asinikot beyond the Beas River, and the capture of Satalmer from the Rathors. He also records conflicts with the Khokhars and Langahas and a series of campaigns extending into the Punjab.

Tod states that after several military victories, Chachak fell ill and sought an honourable death in battle; he challenged the Langaha ruler of Multan to a juddhdān. Before departing, Chachak designated his son Bairsal as heir to most of his dominions and Randhir as ruler of Khadal, centred on Derawar. Chachak was killed fighting the forces of Multan at Dhuniapur. Historian Rima Hooja records his reign ending in 1462.

== Marriages and issue ==
Historians have recorded Chachak Dev's political marriages with women of prominent families, including Rajputs and Muslims.

According to Rajvi Amar Singh, Chachak married four women: Lal Kanwar Sodhi, Suraj Kanwar Chauhan, Sonal Devi, and Kohari, a Langaha Muslim woman. The third wife, Sonal, was the granddaughter of Seta tribe's chief Shoomar Khan. Scholars record the marriage as a traditional example of Hindu-Muslim unions between ruling families.

Singh records seven sons of Chachak:

1. Bairsal, son of Lal Kanwar
2. Maheravan, son of Lal Kanwar
3. Bhim-De, son of Lal Kanwar
4. Randhir, son of Suraj Kanwar
5. Kumbha, son of Kohari
6. Rata, son of Kohari
7. Gaj Singh, son of Sonal Devi

Before his death, Chachak sent Gaj Singh with his mother to her father's home and distributed his territories among the rest of his other sons.

== Bibliography ==
- Haig, Wolseley (1928). The Cambridge History of India, Volume 3: Turks and Afghans. Cambridge University Press. OCLC 1123710775.
- Hooja, Rima (2006). A History of Rajasthan. Rupa. ISBN 978-81-291-0890-6.
- Kothiyal, Tanuja (2016). Nomadic Narratives: A History of Mobility and Identity in the Great Indian Desert. Cambridge University Press. ISBN 978-1-107-08031-7.
- Mathur, Vishnu Dayal (1984). States' People's Conference: Origin and Role in Rajasthan. Publication Scheme. ISBN 978-81-85263-30-4.
- Singh, Rajvi Amar (1992). Mediaeval History of Rajasthan: Western Rajasthan. Jodhpur: Rajvi Amar Singh.
- Singh, Sabita (2019). The Politics of Marriage in India: Gender and Alliance in Rajasthan. Oxford University Press. ISBN 978-0-19-909828-6.
- Tod, James (1920). Crooke, William (ed.). Annals and Antiquities of Rajasthan: Or The Central and Western Rajput States of India (3rd ed.). Oxford University Press. OCLC 4053976.
- Yadav, J. N. Singh (1992). Yadavas Through the Ages, from Ancient Period to Date. Sharada Publishing House. ISBN 978-81-85616-03-2.
