= Cholistan Desert =

Desert in Punjab, Pakistan

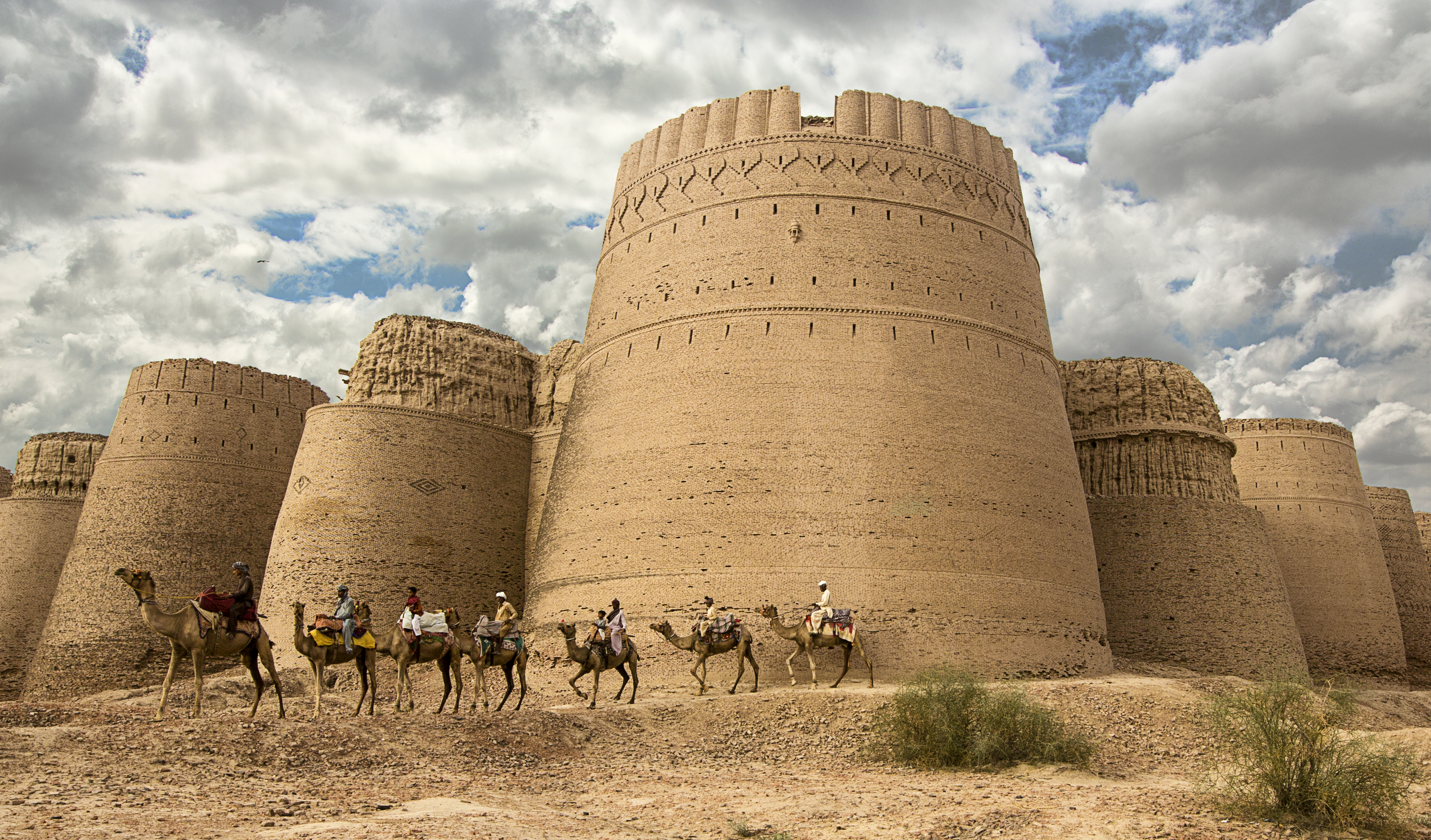
- Derawar Fort is the best surviving example of the forts which used to guard desert caravan routes.

Geography
- Location: Punjab
- Country: Pakistan
- Coordinates: 28.40514°N 71.43478°E
- Interactive map of Cholistan Desert

The Cholistan Desert, (Note: IPA: [tʃoːlɪst̪aːn]; Urdu: صحرائے چولستان) also known locally by its Punjabi name Rohi, (Note: روہی: The Punjabi word Rōhī is also used to refer to any desert; but locally, it only refers to the Cholistan.) is a six-and-a-half miillion acres of sprawling desert in the Bahawalpur Division of Punjab, Pakistan. It forms part of the greater Thar Desert, which also extends into Sindh and Rajasthan. It is one of two large deserts in Punjab, the other being the Thal Desert.

The name is derived from the Turkic word chol, meaning "sands," and istan, a Persian suffix meaning "land of."

Cholistan was a center for caravan trade, leading to the construction of numerous forts in the medieval period to protect trade routes—of which the Derawar Fort is the best-preserved example.

== Geography ==
Cholistan covers an area of 25,800 km^{2} (10,000 sq mi) in the Bahawalpur Division of Punjab. The nearest major city is Bahawalpur city, 30 km (19 mi) from the edge of the desert. The desert stretches about 480 kilometres in length, with a width varying between 32 and 192 kilometres. It is located between 27°42΄00΄΄ to 29° 45΄00΄΄ north, and 69°57' 30'′ to 72° 52' 30'′ east. 81% of the desert is sandy, while 19% is characterized by alluvial flats and small sandy dunes. The entire region is subject to desertification due to poor vegetation cover resulting in wind erosion.

=== Climate ===
Cholistan's climate is characterized as an arid and semi-arid Tropical desert, with very low annual humidity. The mean temperature in Cholistan is 28.33 °C (82.99 °F), with the hottest month being July with a mean temperature of 38.5 °C (101.3 °F). Summer temperatures can surpass 46 °C (115 °F), and sometimes rise over 50 °C (122 °F) during periods of drought. Winter temperatures occasionally dip to 0 °C (32 °F). Average rainfall in Cholistan is up to 180mm, with July and August being the wettest months, although droughts are common. Water is collected seasonally in a system of natural pools called Toba, or manmade pools called Kund. Subsoil water is found at a depth of 30–40 meters, but is typically brackish, and unsuitable for most plant growth.

==== 2022 Cholistan water crisis ====
In May 2022, in the desert areas of Cholistan many cattle died due to extreme heat and water shortage. Shepherds along with their cattle started migrating from water-scarce areas. Toba Salem Sar and Toba Nawa Kahu were the worst affected areas where 50 sheep died due to lack of water.

== Geology ==
Cholistan was formed during the Pleistocene period. Geologically, Cholistan is divided into the Greater Cholistan and Lesser Cholistan, which are roughly divided by the dry bed of the ancient Hakra River. Greater Cholistan is a mostly sandy area in the south and west part of the desert up to the border with India, and covers an area of 13,600 km^{2} (5,300 sq mi). Sand dunes in this area reach over 100 meters in height. Soil in the region is also highly saline. Lesser Cholistan is an arid and slightly less sandy region approximately 12,370 km^{2} (4,780 sq mi) in area which extends north and east from the old Hakra river bed, historically up to the banks of the Sutlej River.

Soil quality is generally poor with little organic matter in the Greater Cholistan, and compacted alluvial clays in the Lesser Cholistan. A canal system built during the British era led to irrigation of the northern part of Lesser Cholistan.

== History ==
Though now an arid region, Cholistan once had a large river flowing through it that was formed by the waters of the Sutlej and Yamuna Rivers. The dry bed of the Hakra River runs through the area, along which many settlements of the Indus Valley civilization/Harappan culture have been discovered, including the large urban site of Ganweriwal. The river system supported settlements in the region between 4000 BCE and 600 BCE when the river changed course. The river carried significant amounts of water, and flowed until at least where Derawar Fort is now located.

Over 400 Harappan sites had been listed in Cholistan in the 1970s, with a further 37 added in the 1990s. The high density of settlements in Cholistan suggest it may have been one of the most productive regions of the Indus Valley Civilization. In the post-Harappan period, Cholistan was part of the Cemetery H culture which grew as a surviving regional variant of the Harappan culture, which was then followed by the Painted Grey Ware culture.

The region became a center for caravan trade, leading to the construction of a dense network of forts in the medieval period - of which the Derawar Fort is the best-preserved example. Other large forts in Cholistan include Meergarh, Jaangarh, Marotgarh, Maujgarh, Dingarh, Khangarh, Khairgarh, Bijnotgarh and Islamgarh - with the suffix "garh" denoting "fort." These forts are part of the Tentative List of UNESCO World Heritage Sites, and run roughly parallel to the Indus and Sutlej Rivers 40 miles to the south. Smaller forts in the area include Bara, Bhagla, Duheinwala, Falji, Kandera, Liara, Murid, Machki, Nawankot, and Phulra forts.

== International Cholistan Desert Rally ==
The Cholistan desert, is home to one of the largest rallies of Pakistan; Cholistan Desert Jeep Rally, hosted by the Tourism Development Corporation of Pakistan. Its roots extend to 2005 and the most recent event marks the 21st anniversary of the rally. According to the official TDCP website, the rally covers the three districts of Punjab including the surrounding areas of Rahim Yar Khan, Bhawalnagar, and Bhawalpur. The rally itself is divided into three different cateogories and has currently been extended to a distance of 500km featuring the major forts of the desert. Along with promoting the beauty of south Punjab's landscape, the rally enhances the livelihood of the locals.

== Economy ==
=== Livestock ===
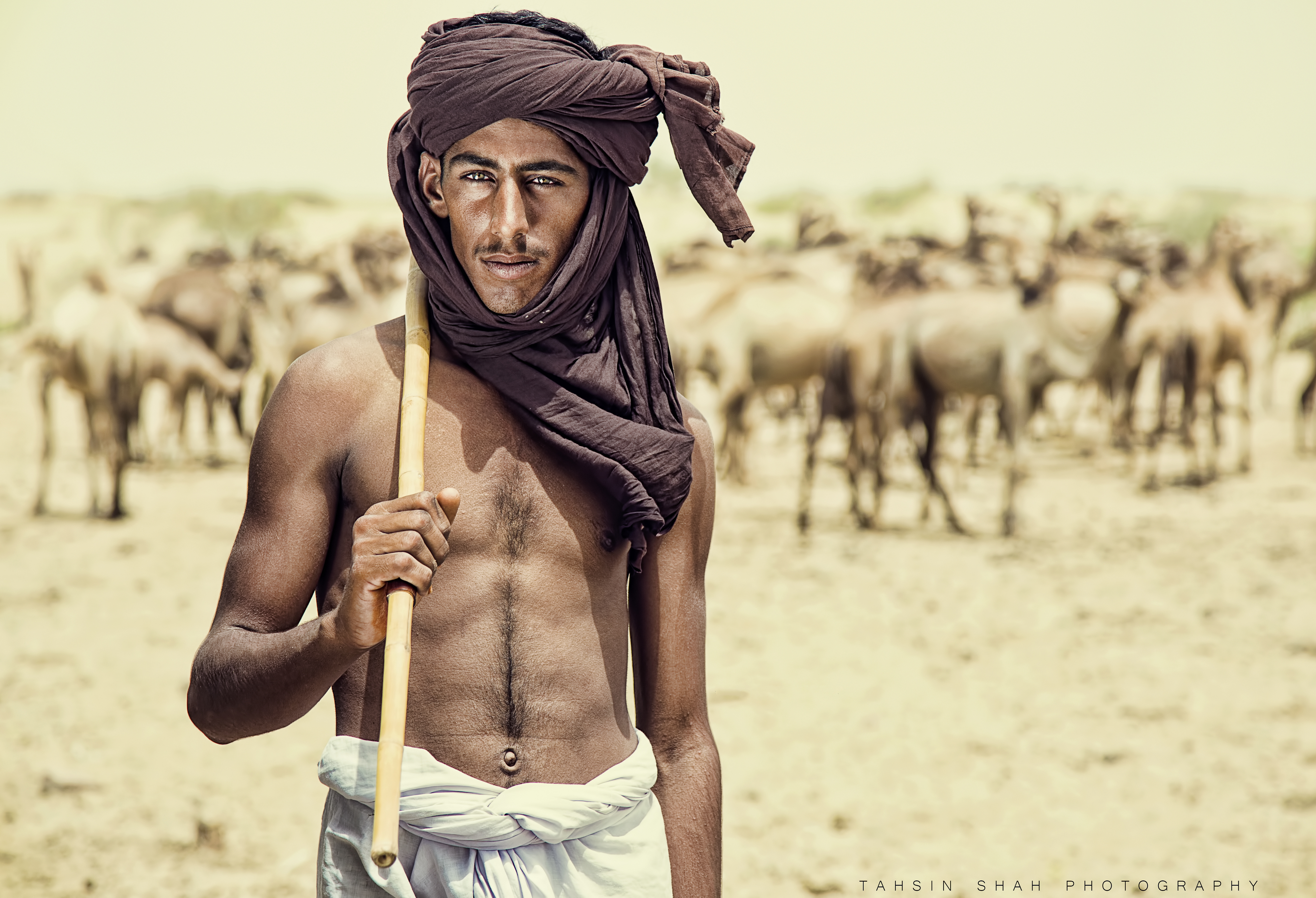
Camel grazers in Cholistan

The backbone of Cholistan economy is animal rearing. Few other livelihood opportunities aside from livestock farming are available in the region. Agricultural farming away from the irrigated regions in Lower Cholistan is difficult due to the lack of steady water supply.

Camels in particular are prized in Cholistan for their meat and milk, use as transportation, and for entertainment such as racing and camel dancing. Two types of camels are found in Cholistan: Marrecha, or Mahra, is used for transportation or racing/dancing. Berella is used for milk production, and can produce 10–15 liters of milk per day per animal.

C34B5457 Mother & Child

Livestock holds much importance for meeting the area's major needs for cottage industry as well as providing milk, meat and fat. Because of the nomadic way of life, the main wealth of the people are their cattle that are bred for sale, milked or shorn for their wool. Moreover, isolated as they were, they had to depend upon themselves for all their needs like food, clothing, and items of daily use. So all their crafts initially stemmed from necessity but later on they started exporting their goods to the other places as well. The estimated number of livestock in the desert areas is 1.6 million.

=== Cotton and wool products ===
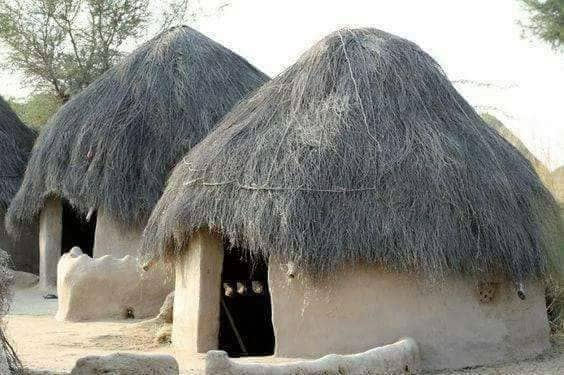
Semipermanent Cholistani huts, known locally as Gopa

Cholistan produces a very superior type of carpet wool compared to that produced in other parts of Pakistan. From this wool they knit beautiful carpets, rugs, and other woolen items. This includes blankets, which is also a local necessity for the desert as it is not always dust and heat, but winter nights here are very cold too, usually below the freezing point. Khes and pattu are also manufactured with wool or cotton. Khes is a form of blanket with a field of black white and pattu has a white ground base. Cholistan is now selling the wool for it brings maximum profit.

=== Textiles ===
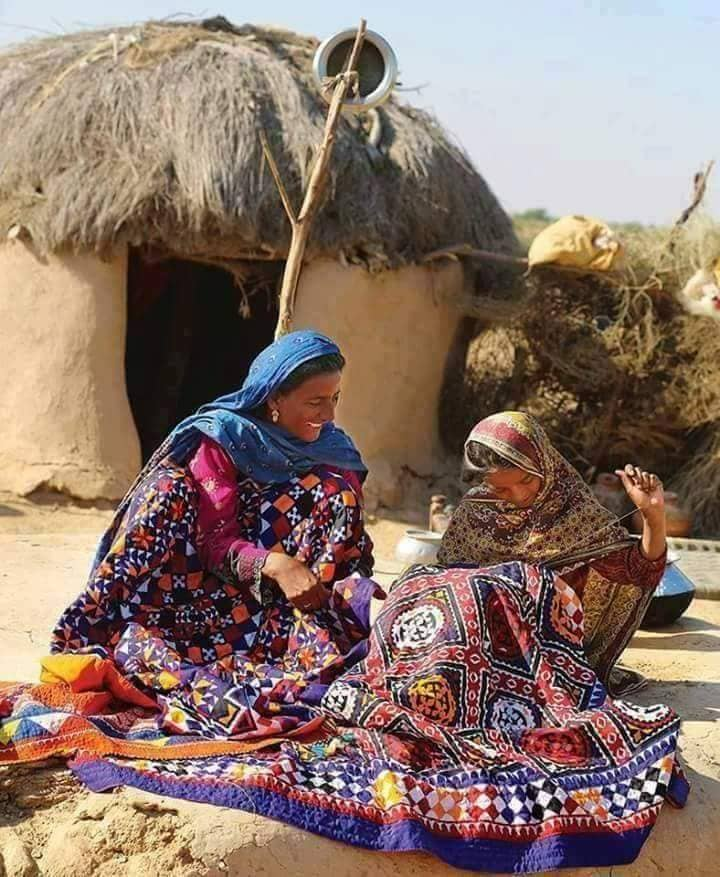
Cholistani textiles

It may be mentioned that cotton textiles have always been a hallmark craft of the Indus Valley civilization. Various kinds of khaddar-cloth are made for local consumption, and fine khaddar bedclothes and coarse lungies are woven here. A beautiful cloth called Sufi is also woven of silk and cotton, or with cotton wrap and silk wool. Gargas are made with numerous patterns and color, having complicated embroidery, mirror, and patchwork. Ajrak is another specialty of Cholistan. It is a special and delicate printing technique on both sides of the cloth in indigo blue and red patterns covering the base cloth. Cotton turbans and shawls are also made here. Chunri is another form of dopattas, having innumerable colors and patterns like dots, squares, and circles on it.

== People ==
As per the 1998 Census of Pakistan, a total of 128,019 people, with a 2015 estimate of 229,071, with 70% living in Lesser Cholistan. The average household size is 6.65.

=== Local crafts ===
As mentioned above, the Indus Valley has always been occupied by the wandering nomadic tribes who are fond of isolated areas, as such areas allow them to lead life free of foreign intrusion, enabling them to establish their own individual and unique cultures. Cholistan till the era of Mughal rule had also been isolated from outside influence. During the rule of Mughal Emperor Akbar, it became a proper productive unit. The entire area was ruled by a host of kings who securely guarded their frontiers. The rulers were the great patrons of art, and the various crafts underwent a simultaneous and parallel development, influencing each other. Masons, stone carvers, artisans, artists, and designers started rebuilding the old cities and new sites, and with that flourished new courts, paintings, weaving, and pottery. The fields of architecture, sculpture, terra cotta, and pottery developed greatly in this phase.

==== Camel products ====
Camels are important to desert dwellers' way of life. Camels are not only useful for transportation and loading purposes, but their skin and wool are also valuable. Camel wool is spun and woven into woolen blankets (known as falsies) and rugs. The camel's leather is also utilized in making caps, goblets, and expensive lampshades.

==== Leather work ====
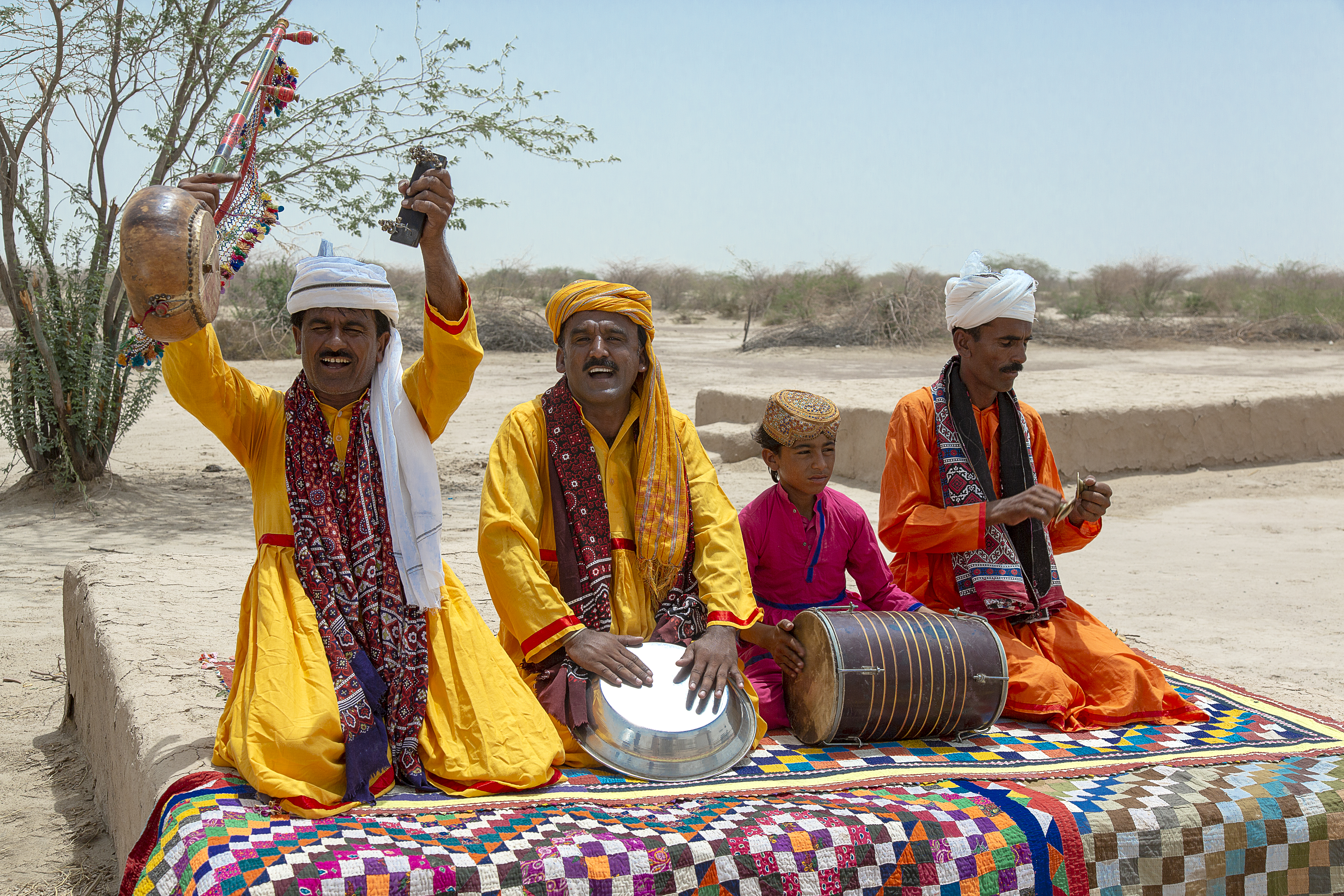
Cholistani musicians

Leather work is another important local cottage industry due to the large number of livestock here. Other than the products mentioned above, Khusa (shoes) is a specialty of this area. Cholistani khusas are very famous for the quality of workmanship, variety, and richness of designs especially when stitched and embroidered with golden or brightly colored threads. People of CholistanDesrt are known to wear glittery clothes.

==== Jewelry ====
The people of Cholistan are fond of jewelry, especially gold jewelry. The chief ornaments made and worn by them are Nath (nosegay), Katmala (necklace) Kangan (bracelet), and Pazeb (anklets). Gold and silver bangles are also a product of Cholistan. The locals similarly work in enamel, producing enamel buttons, earrings, bangles, and rings. Lots of flashy handcrafted jewelry is worn by the bride and the bridegroom on the family wedding events.

== Ecology ==
=== Flora ===
Subsoil water in Cholistan is typically brackish, and unsuitable for most plant growth. Native trees, shrubs, and grasses are drought tolerant. There are 131 plant species in Cholistan from 89 genera and 24 families. Most common of them are below;

1. Prosopis cineraria
2. Haloxylon salicornicum
3. Cenchrus ciliaris

A man-made forest called Dingarh was developed by the Pakistan Council of Research in Water Resources (PCRWR) on more than 100 ha. Dunes were fixed and stabilized by mechanical and vegetative means, and the area is now covered with trees with orchards of zizyphus, date palms, and grassland grown with collected rainwater and saline groundwater.

=== Fauna ===
The wildlife of Cholistan desert mostly consists of migratory birds, especially the Houbara bustard who migrates to this part during winter. This species of bird is most famous in the hunting season, even though they are endangered in Pakistan (vulnerable globally), according to the IUCN Red List. Their population has decreased from 4,746 in 2001 to just a few dozens in recent times.

In December 2016, a Qatari prince had his hunting license rejected due to the species being endangered. Another prince, Dr. Fahad was fined with Rs. 80,000 ($760) and all of the birds he caught were set free for hunting without permit and license.

A few endangered species in this desert are the Chinkara Antelope, Great Indian Bustard, and Blue Bull, etc. Their population of Chinkara has decreased from 3,000 in 2007 to just a little above 1,000 in 2010 due to non-permit hunting of the species by influential political families.

== Forts in Cholistan ==
- Derawar Fort
- Islamgarh Fort
- Mirgarh Fort
- Jamgarh Fort
- Mojgarh Fort
- Marot Fort
- Phoolra Fort
- Khangarh Fort
- Khairgarh Fort
- Nawankot Fort
- Bijnot Fort

== Terracotta ==
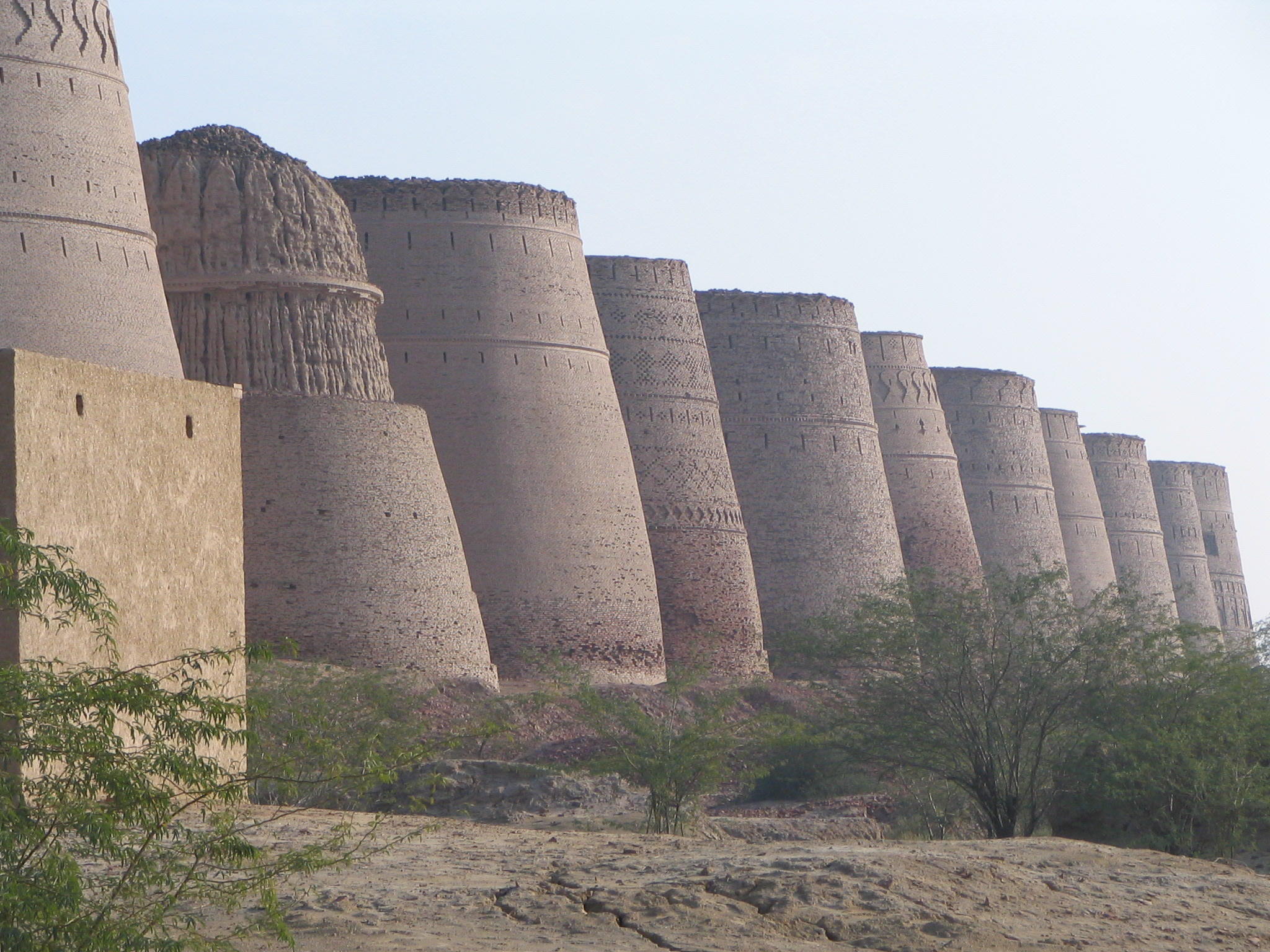
Derawar Fort, Cholistan Desert

The Indus civilization was one of the earliest centres of pottery, and thus the pottery of Cholistan has a long history. Local soil is very fine and suitable for making pottery. The fineness of the earth can be observed on the Kacha houses which are actually plastered with mud but look like they have been white washed. The chief Cholistani ceramic articles are their sarahies (jugs), piyalas (cups), and glasses, remarkable for their lightness and fine finishing.

In earlier times, only the art of pottery and terracotta developed, but from the seventh century onwards, a large number of temples and images were also built on account of the intensified religious passions and the accumulation of wealth in cities.

== See also ==
- Cholistan Desert Jeep Rally
