= Ghazi Barotha water supply project =

The Ghazi Brotha Water Supply Project is a long-term proposed initiative aimed at providing adequate water supply to the twin cities of Rawalpindi and Islamabad. The project was initially conceptualized in 2008 and has been in the works for over 15 years. It is designed to supply 200 million gallons of water per day to the twin cities from the Indus River.

== Background ==
The twin cities of Rawalpindi and Islamabad are facing a water crisis as water levels in the Rawal and Khanpur dams are rapidly depleting due to prolonged drought. The ongoing construction and growing population in Rawalpindi city and cantonment areas have increased the demand for water. Lack of progress on the Ghazibrotha water supply project has further aggravated the expected crisis.

== Project details ==
The project envisages providing 600 million gallons per day (MGD) to the twin cities after completion in three phases. The estimated cost of the first phase of the project is 22 billion 98 crore 23 lakh rupees. However, due to long delay, the cost of the proposed project has reached 150 billion rupees. The project involves the construction of a 24 km long water pipeline from Ghazi Brotha to the water treatment and storage site at Sangjani.

In July 2021, the Capital Development Authority (CDA) and the Pakistan Council of Research in Water Resources (PCRWR) collaborated to assess groundwater, create a regulatory framework and recharge groundwater. A memorandum of understanding has been signed. The cooperation was expected to last for three years. The government has also planned to bring 100 MGD from Ghazi Brotha Dam.

=== Cost ===
As the project will be developed in three phases, the Water and Sanitation Agency (WASA) has proposed that the Punjab government bear only 25 percent of the construction cost of the Ghazi Brotha project. Vasa has also agreed to contribute 25 percent for the project. The total estimated cost of the first phase of the project is estimated at Rs 22.98 billion. As part of Phase I and II, 200 million gallons of additional water per day (MGD) will be made available to the people of the Twin Cities. After completion of Phase III, water supply will increase to 250 MGD per day.

=== PC-1 phase 1 ===
In December 2021, the PC-1 of the project, involving land acquisition of Rs 3.1 billion, has been given clearance. The first phase of the project is estimated to cost Rs 80 billion, to be completed in three years and will culminate in a collective supply of 200 mgd of clean water to Islamabad and Rawalpindi, with each city getting an equal share.

== Current status ==
Despite its importance, the Ghazi Brotha water supply project has suffered setbacks, with progress limited to briefings and discussions. The project was excluded from the Annual Development Program (ADP) submitted by the Water and Sanitation Agency (WASA) for the financial year 2023–24. However, the government has planned to start this project with an investment of 150 billion rupees.
