= Rao Kelana =

15th century Bhati ruler of Pugal

Rao of Pugal
- Reign: c. 1414–1430
- Successor: Chachak Dev II
- Born: Unknown
- Died: 1430 (disputed); Pugal
- Spouse: Mahechi Rani; Sodhi Rani; Zubeida Begum
- Issue: Chachak Dev II (and 7 others)
- Dynasty: Bhati (Rajput)
- Father: Rao Kehar
- Mother: Lacchan Devadi

Rao Kelana (also referred to as Kelan or Kelhana; r. 1414–1430) was a Bhati Rajput ruler of Pugal in present-day Rajasthan who established himself there in 1414. He subsequently expanded his territories towards Bhatinda and Abohar and also invaded Dera Ghazi Khan, where he defeated the Baloches. Kelana was among the chieftains responsible for the death of Rao Chunda of Marwar at Nagaur.

== Early life ==
Kelana was the eldest of the twelve or twenty-four sons of Rao Kehar, the Bhati Rajput ruler of Jaisalmer from 1361 to 1396, and his wife Lacchan Devadi. Kelana was initially designated as his father's heir but was later disinherited after marrying a Mahecha Rathore woman without her father's consent. He subsequently established himself at Pugal, while his younger brother Lakshman was designated heir apparent.

== Rule of Pugal ==
According to traditional accounts recorded by historian Rajvi Amar Singh, Kelana acquired the fort of Pugal in Vikram Samvat 1471 (1414 CE), after agreeing to marry the Sodhi widow of the previous ruler of Pugal, Ranig De. After gaining possession of the fort, however, Kelana did not marry the queen and instead confined her within the fort, where she died. He was then enthroned as Rao of Pugal.

Kelana was among the chieftains who formed an alliance against the expanding power of Rao Chunda of Marwar. The allied forces, which included Kelana, the Sankhlas of Janglu, and Khizr Khan of Multan, attacked and surrounded Chunda at Nagaur, where Chunda was killed in the ensuing fighting.

Kelana is also credited with constructing Assanikot and expanding his territory. At the time of his death, Kelana was in control of nine forts: Pugal, Bikampur, Marot, Mumanvahan, Derawar, Kehror, Binjot, Dera Ismail Khan, and Bhatner.

To mark his ascension and later victory at Marot, Kelana installed a sculpture of the Hindu goddess Mahishasurmardini in yellow Jaisalmer stone at Pugal. The sculpture was put at display at the Government Museum of Jaisalmer in 1985.

== Conflict with the Baloches ==
Kelana's invasion of Dera Ghazi Khan led to defeat of the Baloch army. As a part of the resulting peace settlement, Zubeida, daughter of the Baloch chief Jam Ismail Khan, was married to Kelana. Scholars have cited the Hindu-Muslim union as an example of the political marriages prevalent among ruling groups at the time.

Following the death of his father-in-law Ismail Khan, Kelana intervened in a succession dispute among Khan's sons and stationed a force of 1,000 horsemen for the defence of Dera Ghazi Khan. After Khan's grandson and heir died young, Kelana assumed control of the territory, extending the boundaries of Pugal towards the Indus River.

== Later years and death ==
Nainsi ri Khyat, a recollection of Marwari history by Muhnot Nainsi, states that Kelana died shortly after conquering Derawar, which was his last conquest. His date of death is uncertain. The History of Pugal records that he died at Pugal in 1430; other traditional accounts give his age at death as either 62 or 70.

The Khyat tradition also records that Rao Ranmal of Mandore later occupied Bikampur after killing a Bhati chief named Kelana. Historian Rima Hooja notes that this individual may have been Kelana of Pugal, although she also suggests that he may instead have been a subordinate chief of Rawal Lakshman of Jaisalmer.

== Wives and issue ==
Kelana is recorded as having had three wives:

- Mahechi Rani, daughter of Rawal Mallinath and sister of Jagmal.
- Sodhi Rani, widow of Ranig De, the previous Rao of Pugal.
- Zubeida Begum, daughter of the Baloch chieftain Jam Ismail Khan.

Among Kelana's eight sons, the eldest Chachak Dev II—son of Sodhi Rani—succeeded him as Rao of Pugal, while Khuman and Thira (also called Dhira)—sons of Zubeida Begum—were granted Bhatner.

== Bibliography ==
- Hooja, Rima (2006). A History of Rajasthan. Rupa. ISBN 978-81-291-0890-6.
- Kothiyal, Tanuja (2016). Nomadic Narratives: A History of Mobility and Identity in the Great Indian Desert. Cambridge University Press. ISBN 978-1-107-08031-7.
- Singh, Rajvi Amar (1992). Mediaeval History of Rajasthan: Western Rajasthan. Jodhpur: Rajvi Amar Singh.
- Singh, Sabita (2019). The Politics of Marriage in India: Gender and Alliance in Rajasthan. Oxford University Press. ISBN 978-0-19-909828-6.
- Yadav, J. N. Singh (1992). Yadavas Through the Ages, from Ancient Period to Date. Sharada Publishing House. ISBN 978-81-85616-03-2.
