= Political marriages in India =

Political marriages in India have occurred throughout history, and during the reign of various dynasties.

== Classical period ==
=== Mauryan Empire ===
According to Appian, Seleucus I Nicator, one of Alexander's Macedonian generals who established the Seleucid Empire in 312 BCE with its capital at Babylon, brought Persia and Bactria under his authority, putting his eastern front facing the empire of Chandragupta. Seleucus and Chandragupta waged war until they reached an understanding. Seleucus married off his daughter, Berenice, to Chandragupta to forge an alliance.

Alain Daniélou and D. D. Kosambi note that Seleucus appeared to have fared poorly after ceding large territories west of the Indus to Chandragupta. The Maurya Empire added Arachosia (Kandahar), Gedrosia (Balochistan), Aria (Herat), and Paropamisadae (Kabul). According to Strabo, Seleucus Nicator gave these regions to Chandragupta along with a marriage treaty, and in return received five hundred elephants. The details of the engagement treaty are not known. However, since the extensive sources available on Seleucus never mention an Indian princess, it is thought that the marital alliance went the other way, with Chandragupta himself or his son Bindusara marrying a Seleucid princess, in accordance with contemporary Greek practices to form dynastic alliances. An Indian Puranic source, Pratisarga Parva of the Bhavishya Purana, described the marriage of Chandragupta with a Greek ("Yavana") princess, daughter of Seleucus. The Mahavamsa also states that, seven months after the war ended, Seleucus gave one of his daughters, Berenice (known in Pali as Suvarnnaksi), in marriage to Chandragupta.

Chandragupta sent 500 war elephants to Seleucus, which played a key role in Seleucus' victory at the Battle of Ipsus. In addition to this treaty, Seleucus dispatched Megasthenes as an ambassador to Chandragupta's court, and later Antiochos sent Deimakos to his son Bindusara at the Maurya court in Patna.

=== Gupta Empire ===
Chandragupta I married the Lichchhavi princess Kumaradevi. The Licchavi were an ancient clan headquartered at Vaishali in present-day Bihar during the time of Gautama Buddha. A Lichchhavi kingdom existed in present-day Nepal in the first millennium CE. However, the identity of Kumaradevi's Lichchhavi kingdom is not certain.

Samudragupta's inscription mentions that several kings tried to please him by attending to him personally; offering him their daughters in marriage (or, according to another interpretation, gifting him maidens); and seeking the use of the Garuda-depicting Gupta seal for administering their own territories. These kings included "Daivaputra-Shahi-Shahanushahi, Shaka-Murundas, and the rulers of the island countries such as Simhala".

Chandragupta II married Kuvera-naga (alias Kuberanaga), whose name indicates that she was a princess of the Naga dynasty, which held considerable power in central India before Samudragupta subjugated them. This matrimonial alliance may have helped Chandragupta consolidate the Gupta empire, and the Nagas may have helped him in his war against the Western Kshatrapas.

Kumaragupta I was married to Anantadevi. According to historian R. N. Dandekar, Anantadevi was a Kadamba princess. The Talagunda pillar inscription suggests that the Kadamba king, Kakusthavarman established a matrimonial alliance with the Guptas.

=== Satavahana dynasty ===
Simuka, in order to overthrow the Kanvas, forged an alliance with Ambhiya chief Tranakayiro Kalalaya, by marrying his son, Satakarni, to Tranakayira's daughter Nayanika. This paved the way for the foundation of Satavahana rule over most of Southern India.

In an effort to end the hostilities with the Western Satraps, Vashishtiputra Satakarni, the younger son of Gautamiputra Satakarni, married the daughter of Rudradaman I. The region of Aparanta was conceded by Rudradaman to Vashishtiputra Satakarni as dowry. Despite their marital ties, at least two wars occurred between them, during which the Satavahanas were defeated. Rudradaman, however, spared the life of Vashishtiputra Satakarni, primarily because of their familial relationship.

=== Vakataka dynasty ===
Rudrasena II, the ruler of the Pravarapura-Nandivardhana branch of the Vakataka dynasty, married Prabhavatigupta, the daughter of the Gupta emperor Chandragupta II.

Narendrasena of the Vakataka dynasty was married to a "daughter of a king of Kuntala" named Ajjhitabhattarika. She is purported to be the daughter of the Kadamba king Kakusthavarman, who is known to have married off his daughters to several prominent royal families.

Madhava Varma II of the Vishnukundina dynasty married the daughter of Prithivishena II after subduing him.

== Medieval period ==
=== Rashtrakuta dynasty ===
The Rashtrakuta ruler, Amoghavarsha I, got his daughter Chandrabbalabbe married to Ganga dynasty prince Butuga I. This marriage sealed the alliance between the Ganga dynasty and the Rashtrakutas.

Amoghavarsha III was married to a Kalachuri princess named Kundakadevi. He also had a daughter named Revakanimmadi, who was married to the Western Ganga King Butuga II.

=== Chalukya dynasty ===
Chalukya ruler Kirtivarman II married to a sister of the Sendraka king Shri-vallabha Senanada, who swore allegiance to the Chalukyas after Kirtivarman's conquest of the Kadamba kingdom.

Pulakeshin married the daughter of the Ganga ruler Durvinita, who became the mother of Pulakeshin's son, Vikramaditya I. In return, Shilabhattarika, a daughter of Pulakeshin II was married to Dadiga, a grandson of Durvinita. Pulakeshin II also married an Alupa princess named Kadamba Devi after subduing them.

=== Chalukyas of Vatapi ===
The Chalukya ruler Vikramaditya I entered into a marital alliance with the Western Ganga dynasty by marrying Gangamahadevi.

Vijayaditya I's son, Vishnuvardhana IV, was forced to sue for peace by marrying his daughter, Silamahadevi, to the Rashtrakuta ruler Dhruva Dharavarsha.

=== Western Chalukyas ===
Ayyana I was married to the daughter of Rashtrakuta ruler Krishna II. This marriage raised the Chalukya family's political status. Ayyana I's descendant, Vikramaditya IV, married Bontha Devi, a daughter of the Kalachuri king Lakshmana-raja. Tailapa II married the Rashtrakuta princess Jakavve, the daughter of Bhammaha Ratta, possibly to strengthen his political position.

Bhillama III, a vassal king of the Yadava dynasty of Devagiri, rebelled against Jayasimha II. Jayasimha successfully dealt with the rebellion and managed to recover all of his lost territories by 1024 CE. Bhillama III later married Avalladevi, the daughter of Jayasimha II, as an act of peace.

Vikramaditya VI married one of Virarajendra Chola's daughters, establishing a temporary truce between the two kingdoms. He also dealt with a revolting Kadamba feudatory by marrying off his daughter, Maila Devi, to the Kadamba King Jayakeshi II.

=== Pratiharas of Mandore ===
Kakka, the Pratihara ruler of Mandore, is said to have married Rani Padmini of the Bhati clan, which is considered by some to be identical with the Bhatis of Jaisalmer.

=== Pala dynasty ===
The second ruler of the Pala dynasty in the Bengal region, Dharmapala, was married to a princess named Kamadevi of the Rashtrakuta empire.

Vigrahapala III, son of Nayapala and ruler of the Pala dynasty in the Bengal region, succeeded in receiving Princess Yauvanasri in marriage, a daughter of Lakshmi Karna, ruler of the Kalachuri dynasty of Tripuri, after defeating her father in battle.

=== Utpala dynasty ===
Queen Sugandha, daughter of Svamiraja, a Darad Hindu ruler of a kingdom near Kashmir, was married to the second ruler of the Utpala dynasty, Raja Shankaravarman, and gave birth to Gopalavarman.

Princess Didda, daughter of Simharāja, the king of the Utpala dynasty, was married to Kshemagupta, ruler of the Lohara dynasty of Kashmir.

=== Yadava dynasty ===
Yadava ruler Vaddiga I married Vaddiyavve, also known as Vohivayya, the daughter of Rashtrakuta chieftain Dhorappa, who was the younger brother of Rashtrakuta emperor Krishna III. His descendant Bhillama II married Lachchiyavve, a Rashtrakuta princess. The wives of Vesugi and Bhillama III were Chalukya princesses.

=== Chahamanas ===
According to their inscriptions, the Chahamanas have been noted to have a distinct preference for the Rashtrakutas or Ratraudhas. Tribhuvanesvara of the Chahamana family has been mentioned as having married Laksmidevi of the Rashtrakuta lineage. Alhanadeva was also married to Annalladevi of the Rashtrakuta family. Dharavarsa, a member of the Paramara dynasty, also married the daughter of the Chahamana ruler Kelhanadeva. Satyaraja, belonging to the Paramara family of Vagada, was married to Rajsri of the Chahamana family.

According to the Kanhadade Prabandha, written in the 15th century by Padmanābha, Piroja, the daughter of Alauddin Khalji, fell in love with Viramadeva Songira of Jalore. Alauddin proposed to marry her to Viramadeva, but Viramadeva rejected the offer, triggering Alauddin's invasion of Jalore.

=== Guhila dynasty ===
The Guhilas contracted marital relations with Rajput clans such as the Caulukyas, the Paramaras, the Rashtrakutas, the Cahamanas, and the Hunas.

Rawal Bharttripatta II married a Rashtrakuta princess named Mahalakshmi to forge an alliance against the Pratiharas. His son, Rawal Allata, entered into a matrimonial alliance with the Hunas by marrying a Huna princess, Hariyadevi. Naravāhana, the son of Allata, married Princess Jejaya of the Chahamana family.

Vijayasimha got his daughter, Syamaladevi, married to the Parmara ruler Udayaditya, which ended the traditional animosity between the two houses. Vijayasimha's daughter, Alhaṇadevi, later married the Kalachuri king Gayakarna.

Tejasimha married a Songira princess named Rupadevi. Songira records also maintain an account of Subali, a Guhila princess, marrying a Songira chief named Rao Samantsimha. This was in contravention to the rigid clan hierarchy and the concept of hypergamy among the Rajputs.

=== Tomaras of Gwalior ===
The Gujari Mahal, located in Hisar, Haryana, still hums with the immortal love story of Tomar Rajput emperor Man Singh Tomar and his lover, a Mirgnyani, a Gujjar lady. Man Singh Tomar built Gujjari Mahal in 1354.

=== Khilji dynasty ===
After Alauddin's conquest of Devagiri in either 1296 or 1304, Ramachandra, chief of the Yadava dynasty, got his daughter Jhatyapali Yadava married to Alauddin Khalji. She later became the mother of Alauddin's son and successor Shihab-ud-din Omar.

=== Tughlaq dynasty ===
Ghiyas-ud-din Tughlaq (Ghazi Malik) the founder of the Tughlaq dynasty, was married to a Hindu Jat woman.

Emperor Firuz Shah Tughlaq married a Gurjar lady and also built the Gujari mahal, Hissar for his wife in 1356.

Sipasalar Rajab Tughlaq (Malik Rajab Turk), the younger brother of Sultan Ghiyath al-Din Tughluq and ruler of the Tughlaq dynasty, was married to princess Bibi Naila. Bibi Naila was a Jat concubine-born daughter of a Rajput ruler, Raja Ran Mal (Rana Mall) Bhatti of Abohar, Punjab.

=== Bahmani kingdom ===
Alau'd-din Ahmad Shah, the first ruler of the Bahmani kingdom, married the daughter of Sultan Nadir Khan of the Farooqi dynasty. He also married the daughter of the ruler Sangameshwar.

In 1406, Firuz Shah Bahmani, the Muslim ruler of the Bahmani kingdom, married the daughter of the Hindu King Deva Raya II of the Vijaynagar Empire. Firuz Shah also married his son to a woman whom the Ruler of Vijayanagara had also desired to marry. The Bahmanis prevented women of their clan from marrying beyond their own rank, with some of them being married off to the saintly Ni'mat Allahi family of Bidar.

=== Jaunpur Sultanate ===
Mahmud Shah Sharqi, the ruler of the Jaunpur Sultanate and son of Ibrahim Shah Sharqi, was married to a princess named Bibi Raji. She was the daughter of Sultan Alam Shah, the last ruler of the Sayyid dynasty.

=== Bijapur kingdom ===
Yusuf Adil Shah, the founder of the Bijapur sultanate, was married to a Hindu Maratha princess. She was the daughter of Raja Mukund Rao, the ruler of Idar. After the marriage, Adil Shah gave her a new name, Bibi Khanam, and made her his chief queen.

=== Muzaffarid dynasty ===
Muzaffar Shah I (Zafar Khan), the ruler of the Muzaffarid dynasty, gave his daughter in marriage to Firzoz Shah Tughlaq, ruler of the Tughlaq dynasty. Later, he was appointed as governor of the Gujarat with the title "Muzaffar Khan" by Firoz Shah Tughlaq in 1391 CE.

Muzaffar Shah II married three Hindu Rajput princesses: Rajbai, Bibi Rani, and Laximi Bai. Rajbai was the daughter of Rana Mahipat. Laximi Bai was the daughter of a chief of the Gohil Rajputs and the mother of Qutb-ud-Din Bahadur Shah. Bibi Rani, the chief queen of Muzaffar Shah, was the mother of Sikander Khan. She was the daughter of a Rajput of the suryavansa family.

Maldeo, the Rajput ruler of Rathore dynasty of Marwar, gave his two daughters in marriage to the Muslim rulers of the Muzaffarid dynasty of Gujarat. Queen Kankavati Rathore was married to Mahmud Shah III, and Maldeo's second daughter was married to Islam Shah of Gujarat.

== Early modern period ==
=== Mughal Empire ===
Akbar was selective about Muslim royal families he chose to accept as subordinate allies through acceptance of their daughters as brides. Political marriages were also noted to be unsuccessful at ending enmity; for example, despite the marriage of Miran Mubarak Shah II's daughter to Akbar in 1564, the Khandesh Sultanate periodically fought wars with the Mughals. In 1561, Akbar married his sister to Mirza Sharaf-ud-din Husain, a Timurid noble who later conspired against him.Akbar’s other sisters and daughters were married to Timurids and prominent Muslims from Central and West Asia. Mirza Muzaffar Husain Khan, the former Timurid ruler of Gujarat, was also noted to have married one of Akbar's daughters. Akbar also gave his daughter to Mirza Shahrukh, the deposed Timurid ruler of Badakhshan, and another one to his brother-in-law Raja Ali Khan of Khandesh.

Although a few Rajput rulers provided brides to the Mughals, the Sisodia clan of Mewar was an exception and had refused to send their women to the Mughal Harem, which resulted in a siege and mass suicide at Chittor. Once Mewar had submitted and alliance of Rajputs reached a measure of stability, matrimonial between leading Rajput states and Mughals became rare, Sabita Singh also notes that while the scale of Rajput-Mughal marriages peaked during Akbar's reign, Akbar's successors abandoned the use of extensive matrimonial alliances, diminishing its political significance. Some accounts state that neither Akbar nor his successors provided brides to the Rajputs.

According to Maasir-i-Alamgiri, the daughters of Maratha rulers Sambhaji and Rajaram were married to Mughal noblemen. According to a few sources, Jahangir, the son of Akbar himself born to a Hindu princess, barred any potential giving of brides to the Hindus:

They ally themselves with Hindus, and both give and take girls. Taking them is good, but giving them, God forbid! I gave an order that hereafter they should not do such things, and whoever was guilty of them, should be capitally punished.

— Emperor Jahāngir

=== Sisodia dynasty ===
According to bardic legends, Hammir Singh (1302–1364) is said to have married a Songira princess named Songari Devi of Jalore.

Rao Mandalika III (1451 CE to 1472 CE) of Junagadh was married to Sisodia princess Ramavati, who was Rana Kumbha's daughter. The Guhilas maintained and reinforced their social ties with the Rajput rulers of Gujarat until the end of the fifteenth century.

Narain Das, the Raja of Bundi, fought alongside Rana Raimal during his campaign against the sultan of Malwa. Raimal was impressed by Das's valour and arranged for one of his nieces to marry him.

The decline of the Mughal Empire in the eighteenth century was marked by the onset of Rajput rebellions across the empire. In this struggle for dominance, the Ranas of Mewar leveraged Mewar's history of resistance against the Mughals, exemplified by their refusal to enter any matrimonial alliance with them. The Ranas of Mewar also highlighted their role as defenders of Rajput honor.

=== Rathore dynasty ===
In 1395, Rao Chunda was approached by the Pratihars of Mandore, who proposed an alliance against the Tughlaq Empire. Chunda agreed and married a Pratihar princess. It was common practice to include villages and land in a Rajput princess's dowry, as exemplified by Rao Chunda, who received the fortified city of Mandore and a thousand villages as dowry. His daughter, Hansa Bai, was later married to Rana Lakha of Mewar.

Rao Ranmal married multiple times, as was common among the Rajput elite. He is known to have married Kodamde Bhatiyani, daughter of Ranigde, Rao of Pugal; Bharmali, daughter of Chacha, son of Kshetra Singh, Rana of Mewar; and Rami Bai, daughter of Lalaji Songira of Nadol.

In 1438, Ranmal was assassinated on the orders of Rana Kumbha, leading to a period of hostility between the two houses. Eventually, peace was established after a marriage between Rao Jodha's daughter, Shringar Devi, and Rana Kumbha's son, Raimal.

Rao Bika, the eponymous founder of the kingdom of Bikaner, was married to Bhatiyani Rani Rang Kanwar, the daughter of Rao Shekha, the Bhati ruler of Pugal.

In 1496, Maharana Rinmala married one of his daughters to the crown prince of Merta, Viramdev, who was a son of Rao Duda. In 1537, Maldeo Rathore besieged Jaisalmer. Rawal Lunkaran was forced to sue for peace by marrying his daughter, Umade Bhattiyani, to Rathore.

In 1562, Akbar married the granddaughter of Rao Viramdev of Merta. On 15 November 1570, Rai Kalyan Singh married his daughter, Raj Kanwar, to Akbar. In the same year, Akbar married Bhanumati, another niece of Rai Kalyan Singh of Bikaner. Also in 1570, Puram Bai, a great-granddaughter of Rao Viramdev, married Akbar. Akbar married Rukmavati, the daughter of Rao Maldeo, through one of his concubines. On 11 January 1586, the marriage of Prince Salim (Jahangir) to Princess Manavati Bai, the daughter of Mota Raja Udai Singh, took place. Prince Salim also married Karamsi, the daughter of Kesho Das (Rathore-Bikaner).

In April 1624, the marriage of Prince Parvez to Princess Manbhavati Bai, the sister of Maharaja Gaj Singh Rathore of Marwar, took place. Prince Khurram (Shah Jahan) married Lilavati Bai, the daughter of Sakat Singh of Marwar. In 1649, Mughal Emperor Shah Jahan resolved the enmity between Rao Amar Singh and Maharaja Jaswant Singh by ordering the marriage of Jasiangde to Maharaja Jaswant Singh.

In 1654, the daughter of Rao Amar Singh was married to Prince Suleiman Shikoh. In 1671, Mohammaduazzam (Bahadur Shah I) married Princess Amrita Bai, the daughter of Maharaja Roop Singh Rathore of Kishangarh.

On 27 September 1715, Farrukhsiyar married Princess Indira Kanwar, the daughter of Maharaja Ajit Singh. In 1718, Ajit Singh of Marwar married his daughter to the Raja of Jaipur, Sawai Jai Singh, to garner his support in favour of the Sayyid brothers in the Mughal court. Also in that same year, Sawai Jai Singh, seeking to increase his influence in the Marwar court, married his daughter to Abhai Singh, the son of Maharaja Ajit Singh. In 1729, Abhai Singh, the Rana of Marwar, subjugated various local chiefs. The prince of Sirohi chose to offer his daughter in marriage instead of resisting Abhai Singh. The practice of offering a daughter to resolve hostility was intended to secure peace and protect against potential attacks.

=== Kachwaha dynasty ===
In February 1562, Raja Bharmal of Amer, an early member of Akbar's court, allied with Akbar by marrying his daughter, Mariam-uz-Zamani, to him. During Akbar's reign, the incentive for marriage came from the Mughal side. Surjan Hada is known to have joined the alliance on the condition that Akbar would not marry any of his daughters, so no marriage took place. However, not all Rajputs accepted the offer to enter an alliance with Akbar. Both Rao Chandrasen of Jodhpur and Rana Pratap Singh of Mewar refused to bow down to the emperor. Their resistance is attributed to their desire to remain independent and, in Rana Pratap's case, to his refusal to suffer the humiliation of sending a daughter to the imperial harem. The scale of Rajput-Mughal marriages peaked during Akbar's reign. However, Akbar's successors abandoned the use of extensive matrimonial alliances, diminishing its political significance.

Man Singh I's brother, Chandrabhan Kachwaha, married the daughter of Raja Puranmal of Gidhaur, whose fort was easily conquered by the Kachwaha army.

Prince Salim's first and chief consort was the Kachwaha Rajput princess, Kunwari Manbhawat Deiji, daughter of Raja Bhagwant Das of the Kingdom of Amber, entitled Shah Begum, to whom he was betrothed in the 16th year of his life.

On 5 July 1678, Azim-ush-Shan married Bai Jas Kaur, the daughter of Kirat Singh, who was the son of Raja Jai Singh

On 30 July 1681, Aurangzeb's son Kaam Baksh married Kalyan Kumari, the daughter of Amarchand of Manoharpur.

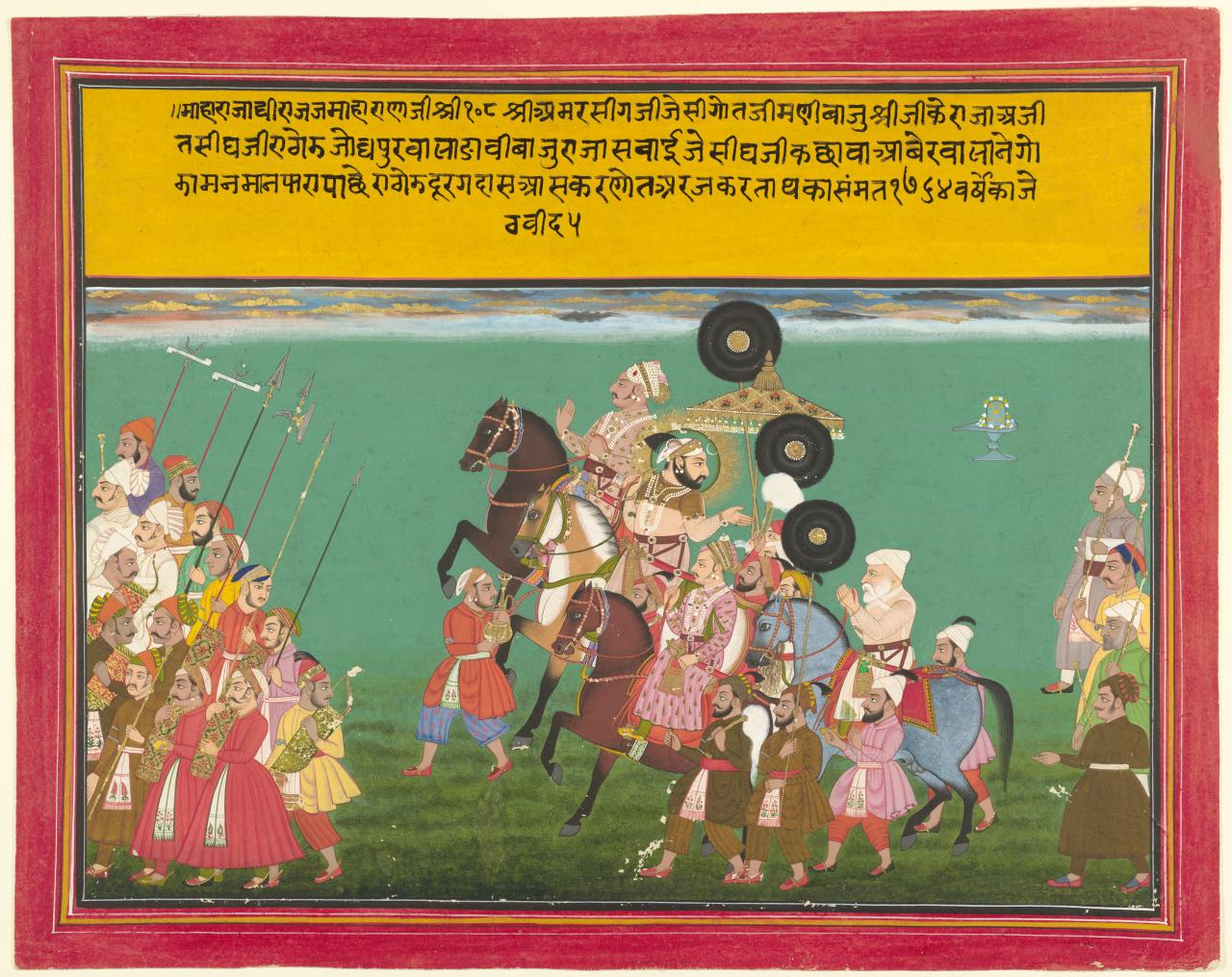
A Mewari painting of Ajit Singh, Amar Singh II, Maharaja Jai Singh II and Durgadas Rathore.

During the Rajput rebellion of 1708, Sawai Jai Singh II re-established marital alliances with the state of Mewar after 150 years by marrying the daughter of Maharana Amar Singh II. He also married the daughter of Maharaja Ajit Singh of Jodhpur in an effort to reclaim lost territories and forge a unified coalition against Aurangzeb's successor, Bahadur Shah.

=== Bhatis of Jaisalmer ===
Udai Singh II was married to Dheer Bai Bhattiyani, a sister of Umade Bhattiyani.According to an inscription from 1324 AD, Kshemasimha had his daughter Dulha Devi married to King Karna Deva of Jaisalmer.

Many Rajput clans converted to Islam over time; however, their lifestyle did not differ greatly from their Hindu counterparts. There have been many instances of intermarriages between Muslim and Hindu Rajputs for political reasons. For example, the marriage of the daughter of Ismail Khan, the ruler of Sind, to Rao Kalan of Jaisalmer for consolidating his kingdom. Another instance can be seen in Chachi Deo's (1448–1462) marriage to the granddaughter of Mohammad Shoomar Khan.

Baloch chief Jam Ismail Khan submitted to Rao Kelana, the ruler of the Bhati Kingdom of Pugal, by marrying off his daughter Zubeida as part of the peace settlement.

In 1570, Maharawal Harraj Singh got his daughter, Princess Nathi Bai, married to Akbar. In 1587, Prince Salim married, Malika Jahan, the daughter of Maharawal Bhim Singh of Jaisalmer.

=== Peshwas of Maratha Empire ===
A Muslim princess Mastani was married to Peshwa Bajirao I of Maratha Empire. Accounts with regard to the origin of Mastani vary. Some consider her the daughter of Nizam Asaf Jah I of Hyderabad, while others refer to her as a courtesan of the court of some Muslim chief. Another theory says she was the daughter of Bundela ruler Chhatrasal through his Muslim concubine Ruhani Bai. The marriage was arranged by Nizam or Chhatrasal in order to promote diplomatic relations with Marathas.

=== Kolhapur state ===
Sambhaji II, the second Maratha ruler of the Kolhapur State, married a Rajput princess from Ramnagar after becoming Chhatrapati at Poona.

=== Jats ===
Akbari Jats, Jahangiri Jats, Shah Jahauni Jats and Aurangzebi Jats derive their the name of Mughal monarch

== Modern period ==
=== Bijawar state ===
Bijawar's Maharaja Sawant Singh was a Bundela Rajput adopted from the house of Orchha State. He married a woman of the Ahir or Yadav caste, who gave birth to their son Aman Singh in 1911. Aman Singh was denied inheritance by the authorities based on the belief that his succession would be "greatly resented by rulers not merely in Bundelkhand but also in Rajputana and Kathiawar, where Bundela Rajput rulers have in recent years contracted marriages."

=== Kapurthala state ===
The daughter of Jagatjit Singh of Kapurthala State, Amrit Kaur, was married to Rajput Joginder Sen of the princely state of Mandi.

In 1928, Sita Devi, a Hindu Rajput princess from the Kashipur princely state in Punjab, married Maharaja Kamarjit Singh, an Ahluwalia Sikh ruler and son of Maharaja Jagajit Singh of the Kapurthala princely state in Punjab. She was the daughter of Udai Raj Singh I, ruler of Kashipur state.
