= Bijnot Fort =

- قلعہ بجنوٹ
- Interactive map of the Bijnot Fort area
- Alternative names: Winjhrot

General information
- Type: Fortification
- Location: Bahawalpur District, Punjab, Pakistan
- Coordinates: 28°5′22″N 71°40′55″E
- Year built: 8th century AD

Bijnot Fort (Urdu: قلعہ بجنوٹ) is a ruined fortress located in Bahawalpur District of Punjab, Pakistan, 23 kilometres (14 miles) west of the Pakistan-India border in Cholistan Desert.

== History ==
Constructed in the 8th century, Bijnot Fort now stands in ruins, primarily due to targeted artillery shelling during the 1971 India-Pakistan War, rather than natural deterioration.

It was under the occupation of Rajputs until 18th century.

=== Outlaws connection ===
The fort's narrative isn't its historical significance, but the infamous outlaws who frequented it. Madho Singh, a Rathore clansman from Bikaner, became a fugitive after retaliating violently against a neighbor's insult towards his father. Escaping to Jaisalmer, he joined a gang of petty criminals, swiftly rising to be their leader. The gang's criminal activities escalated, leading to a significant heist and subsequent relocation to Pakistan in 1948, near Fort Abbas.

The gang's cross-border criminal activities led to a confrontation with Rajasthan Police, resulting in the death of Madho's deputy, Krishen Singh. His ashes, according to local lore, were sent to the Ganga River.

After the incident, Madho Singh secured an audience with the Nawab of Bahawalpur, gifting him a richly decorated camel. Consequently, Madho Singh and his remaining gang were permitted to settle in Dera Nawab, the Nawab's seat of power.

Traditionally, Poorbia Rajputs served as the Nawab's harem guards. After Bahawalpur's incorporation into Pakistan, these guards returned to India, leading to Madho Singh and his gang assuming this duty. However, they soon relocated to the desert, resuming cross-border operations and escalating their criminal activities.

By 1963, Madho Singh was allegedly involved in 135 cases in India. In an act of revenge for a fallen comrade, Madho kidnapped Bhoor Singh. Despite pursuit, they avoided capture. Eventually, Madho executed Bhoor Singh, leading to his own capture and subsequent 14-year custody without trial or conviction.

In 1978, Madho and his gang were released, thanks to human rights lawyer Abid Minto, and granted Pakistani citizenship. Seeking peace, Madho rejected offers of protection tied to criminality, opting for lawful living under the shelter of Lal Mian Abbasi. He died in 1983, ensuring his remaining gang pledged law-abiding loyalty to the Abbasi family. This pledge was upheld until the last accomplice, Moolji, died in 1999.

== See also ==
- Derawar, another fort in Cholistan
