= Water and Sanitation Agency =

The Water And Sanitation Agency (WASA) (Urdu: ایجنسی برائے پانی اور نکاسی آب) is a Governmental body responsible for planning, designing, development and maintenance, repair and operations of water supply and sewerage and draining system, as well as collection of Aquifer Water charges. A compulsory element of this mandate is to provide a safe, reliable and efficient water supply to satisfy the demand of all government and public sectors.

== History ==
Water And Sanitation Agency (WASA) was established by Lahore Development Authority in 1976. In February 2026, WASA Lahore completed 50 Years.

== Structure ==
The Water And Sanitation Agency (WASA) is chaired by the Managing Director (MD), currently WASA Lahore headed by Mr Ghufran Ahmed, he has over 30 years of experience in Operations, Public Health, Engineering & Management, and further assisted by three Deputy Managing Directors (DMDs) that are DMD (F&R) Finance, Administration and Revenue, DMD (O&M) Operation & Maintenance, and DMD (E) Engineering.

== Functions ==
Water And Sanitation Agency (WASA) is essentially responsible for Planning, Designing and Construction of Water Supply for:

- Rehabilitation of the existing Water supply System.
- Operation and Maintenance (O&M) of Water Supply, Sewerage and Drainage.
- Imposing fines over water wastages in Lahore
- Billing and Collection of monthly fee and Charges for the services provided to its consumer against sewerage & Water etc.
- Undertaking Bulk Production, filtration/treatment, transmission & retail distribution purifying of water.
- Collection, Pumping, Treatment & Disposal of Sewage & Industrial Waste Water.
- Enforcement and taking Legal action against defaulters and unauthorized connections as per Law.
- Billing & Collection of Aquifer Water charges from Beverages & Water Bottling plants form all over Punjab, as well as billing of Industrial units, Commercial & Corporate bodies against ground Water (Aquifer) extraction from revelent Districts, also implement the laws regarding Water Conversation as per directions of Hournable SCP & Hournable LHC further assisted by (JWEC).
- Long term planning and development for tapping additional water sources, Trement and diposal station for sewer water & its implementation to meet water supply and sewerage demand projected.
- WASA also get Financial, Technical and Recerch assistance from International Banks and Organisations such as JICA, UNDP, WB, EU, AIIB, ADB, KfW Development Bank (Germany), PCCC, SPIC (China), APWASI, DAFT (Australia), DEP (USA), BWW (Hungary), (GIZ) GmbH German development agency, Danida (DSIF) Denmark & Unicef etc. against Development Projects.
