= Pakistan Council of Research in Water Resources =

Pakistani government agency responsible for water resources research and management

- شورای تحقیقات منابع آب پاکستان

Agency overview
- Jurisdiction: Pakistan
- Headquarters: Islamabad, Pakistan
- Website: pcrwr.gov.pk

The Pakistan Council of Research in Water Resources (PCRWR) is a national organization in Pakistan that conducts research and provides recommendations on water resources management and quality. The council plays a crucial role in addressing the country's water scarcity issues, ensuring the safety of bottled water, and collaborating with international partners to combat water-related challenges.

== History ==
=== Act ===
In 2023, the Pakistan Council of Research in Water Resources Act underwent a revision. This revision, referred to as the Pakistan Council of Research in Water Resources (Amendment) Act, 2023, was approved by the President on April 11, 2023. The amendment replaced Section 16 of the Act, which details the council's power to hire employees, engage experts, advisers, and consultants, and establish their terms and conditions.

== Bottled water safety ==
The PCRWR consistently checks the quality of bottled water within the country. A recent report from the council revealed that 25 brands of bottled water were deemed unfit for human consumption due to either microbiological or chemical contamination. These unsafe brands were identified to contain excessive levels of sodium, elevated levels of Total Dissolved Solids (TDS), high levels of potassium, or were found to be tainted with bacteria.

== Collaboration with China ==
The Pakistan Council of Research in Water Resources (PCRWR) has also entered into a partnership with China to assist Pakistan in addressing water-related issues. The objective of this Pak-China collaboration is to employ technical methods to manage water resources, which could aid Pakistan in dealing with the impacts of climate change and associated disasters.

== Water scarcity in Pakistan ==
Pakistan is grappling with a serious water crisis, with numerous regions of the country suffering from intense water shortages. By 2025, the country is predicted to shift from being 'water-stressed' to 'water-starved'. Climate change further intensifies the water scarcity, leading to unpredictable weather patterns and severe weather occurrences like floods and droughts.

=== Addressing the water crisis ===
Addressing the water crisis necessitates collaborative efforts at various levels. There is an immediate need for the country to reduce its greenhouse gas emissions, adapt to the evolving climate, and build resilience against the already occurring impacts. This involves the adoption of climate-smart agricultural practices, such as the cultivation of drought-resistant crops, enhanced water management techniques, and improved soil conservation practices. The pressing need to tackle the water crisis has been underscored, with practical suggestions for a sustainable future being put forward.
