= Pugal =

Pugal Puran Dhamu
- Town
- Location in Rajasthan, India Pugal (India)
- Coordinates: 28.5000°N 72.8000°E
- Country: India
- State: Rajasthan
- District: Bikaner
- Elevation: 145 m (476 ft)

Population (2001)
  - Total: 6,314

Languages
  - Official: Hindi
- Time zone: UTC+5:30 (IST)

Pugal is a town in the Bikaner district of Rajasthan, India. It is also the headquarters of the tehsil in the Pugal Sub-division with the same name.

== Geography ==
Pugal is located at 28°30′00″N 72°48′0″E. It has an average elevation of 145 metres (869 feet).

== Demographics ==
As of 2001 India census, Pugal had a population of 6,314. Males constitute 3,416 of the population and females 2,898.
