= Marot =

Marot مروٹ
- City
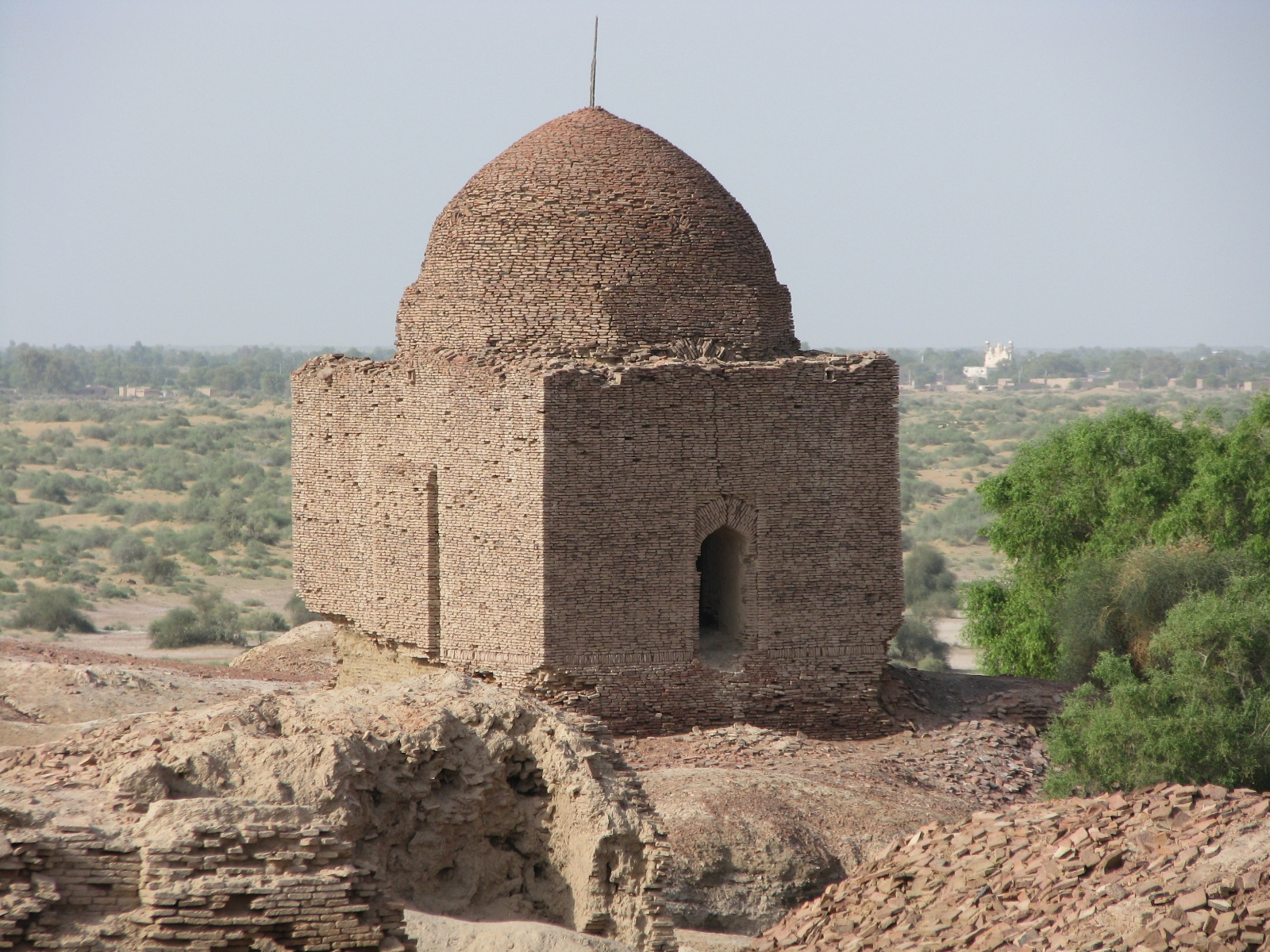
- Fort Marot

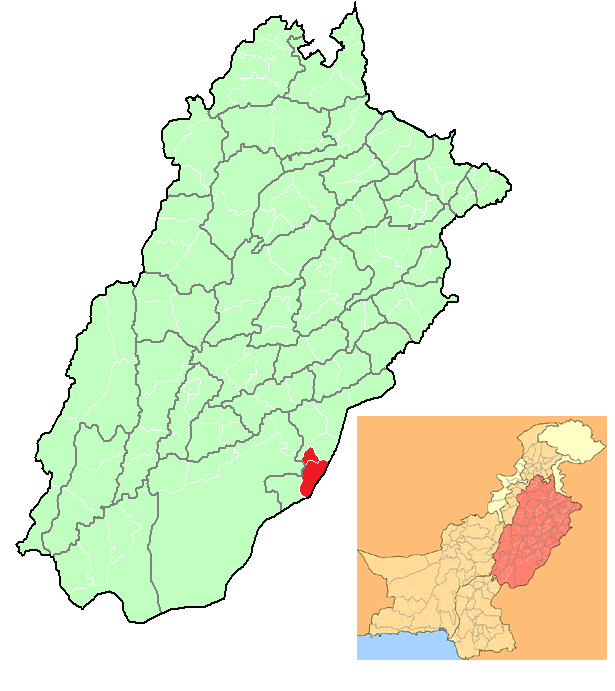
- Location of Marot (in red) in Punjab, Pakistan and (inset) Punjab in Pakistan

- Location within Pakistan
- Coordinates: 28.51°N 71.50°E
- Country: Pakistan
- Province: Punjab
- District: Bahawalnagar
- Tehsil: Fort Abbas

Population
  - Total: 280,000
- Time zone: UTC+5 (PST)
- Postal code: 62000
- Dialling code: 063
- Number of Union councils: 4
- Marot Cantonment is a legally separate military-administered settlement.

Marot (Punjabi, Urdu: مروٹ) is a city in Bahawalnagar District in Punjab, Pakistan. This city is situated at the border with India. 50 km from Fort Abbas, 160 km from Bahawalnagar and 100 km from Bahawalpur. The population of the city is estimated 20,000, with some 280,000 in the entire district. It contains some notable forts such as Marot Fort, Jaamgarh, Mojgarh and Meergarh.

Local people are largely associated with agriculture, business and cattle farming. Major crops are wheat, cotton, mustard and sugarcane.

The spoken languages are Punjabi, Urdu, and Saraiki. The Marot is one of the nine principal fortified Bhati Rajput towns in the Thar Desert, according to historical records.

== Gallery ==
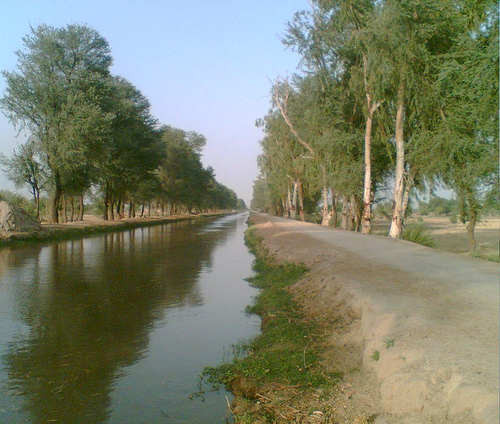
Hakra canal

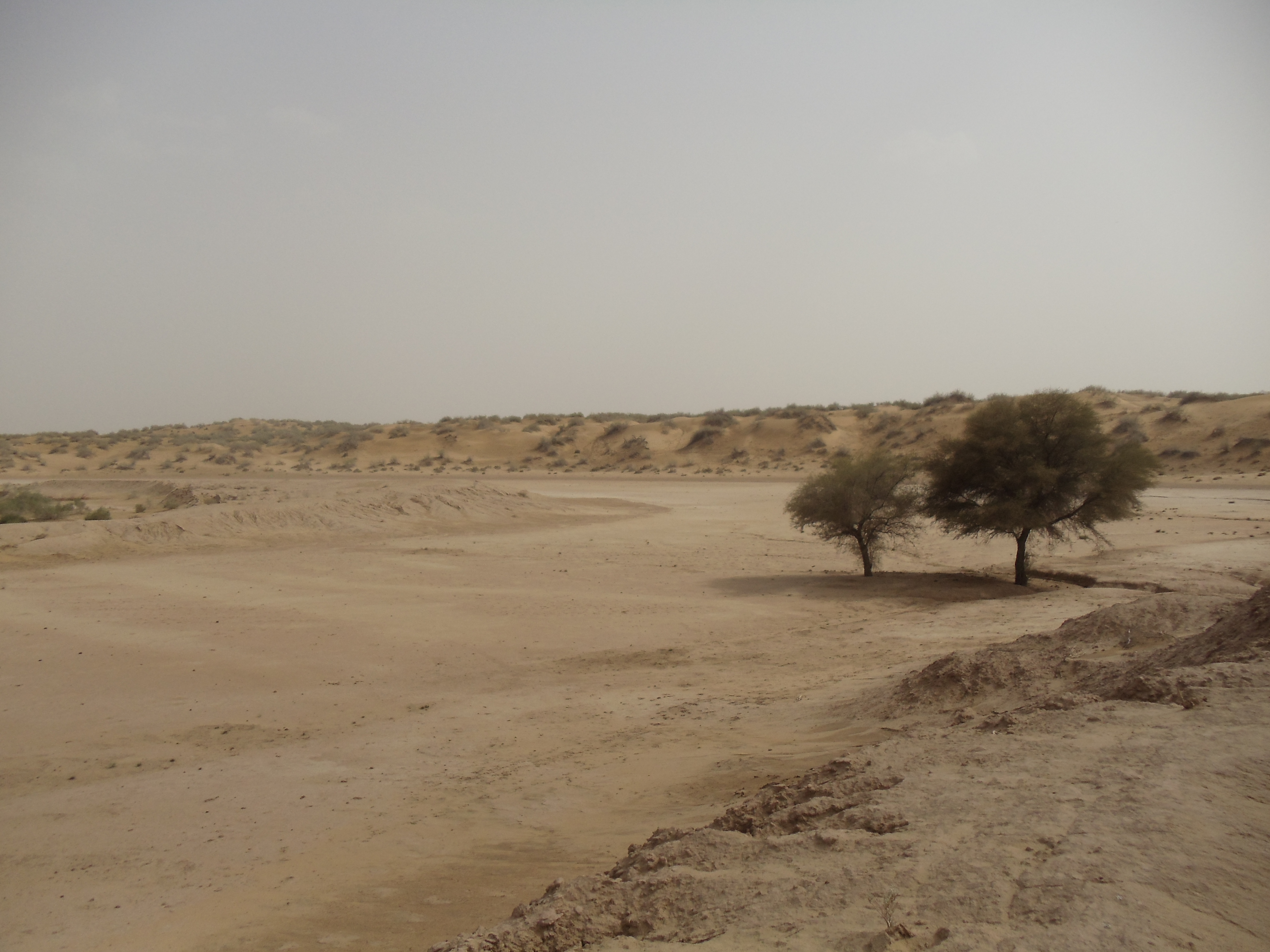
Cholistan /Rohi Desert

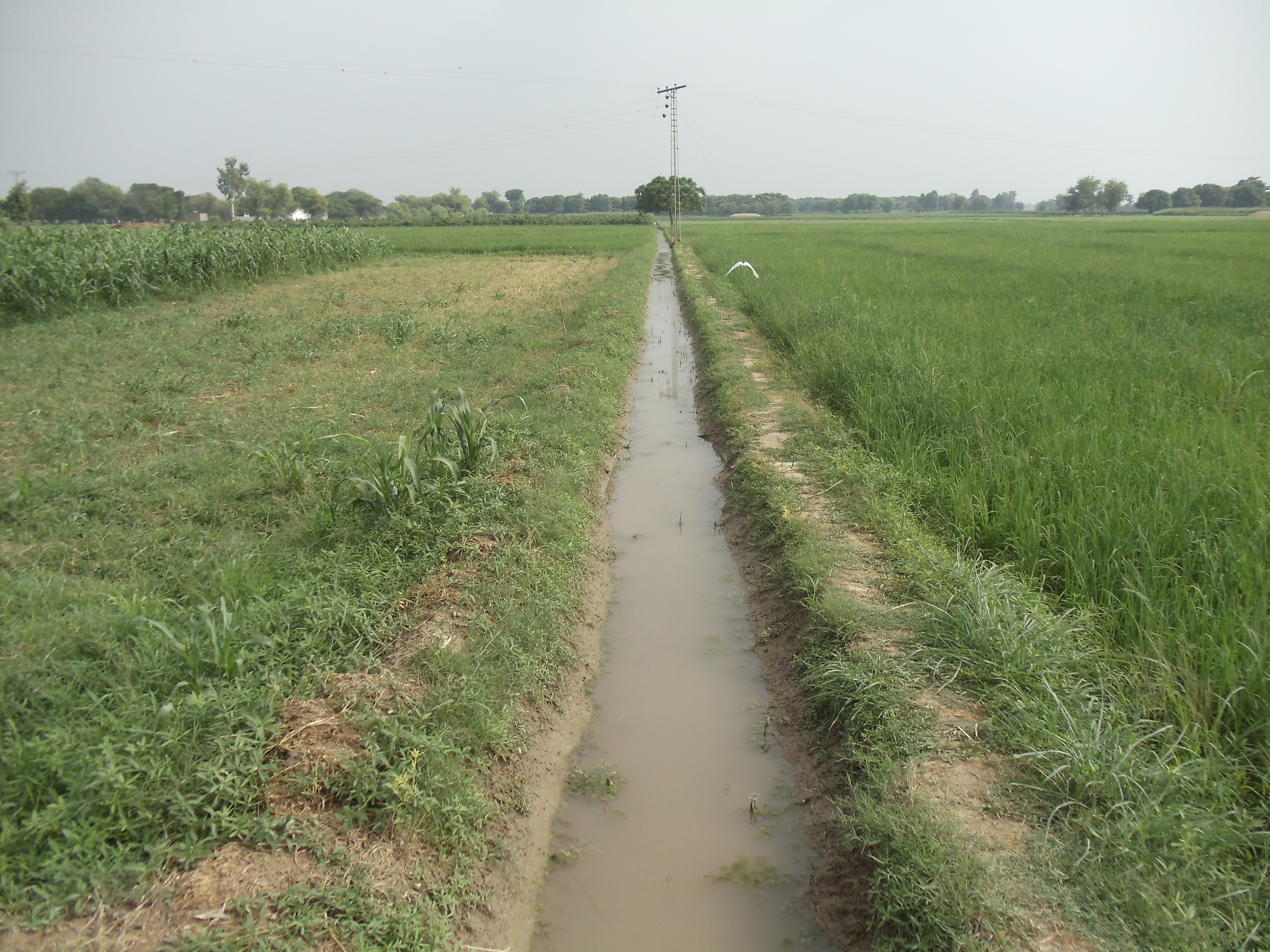
Little canal in fields

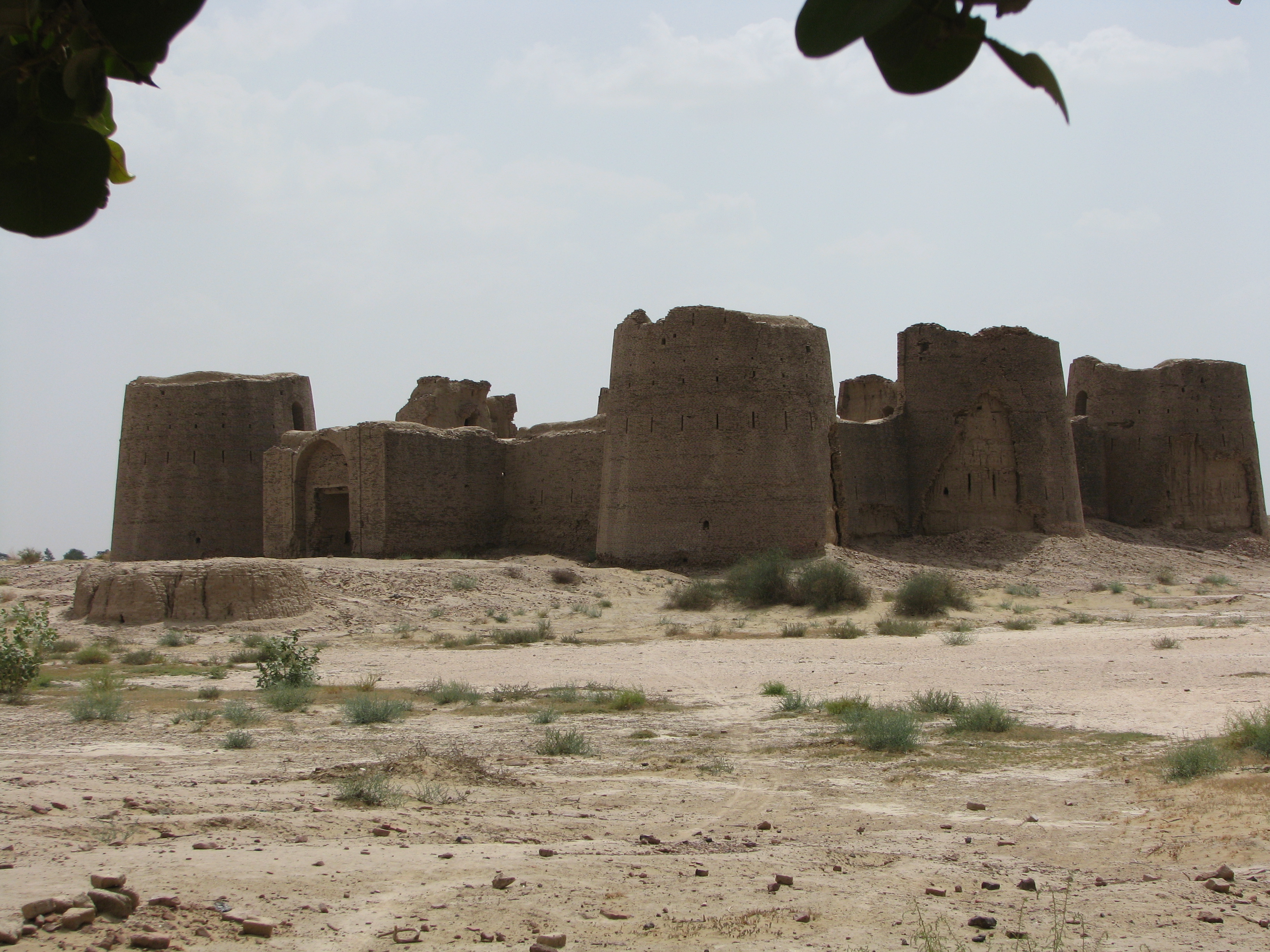
Fort Meergarh

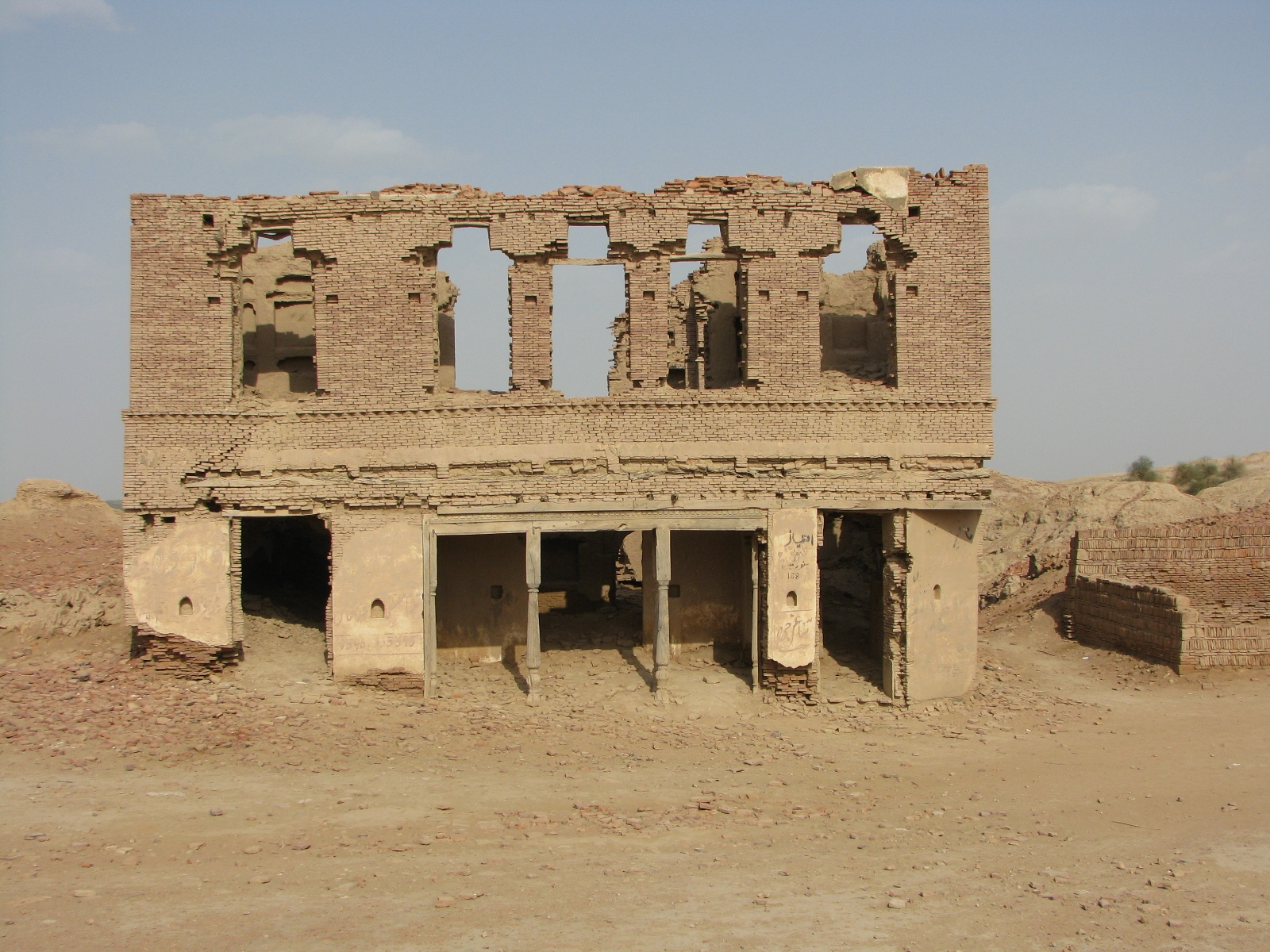
Fort Marot

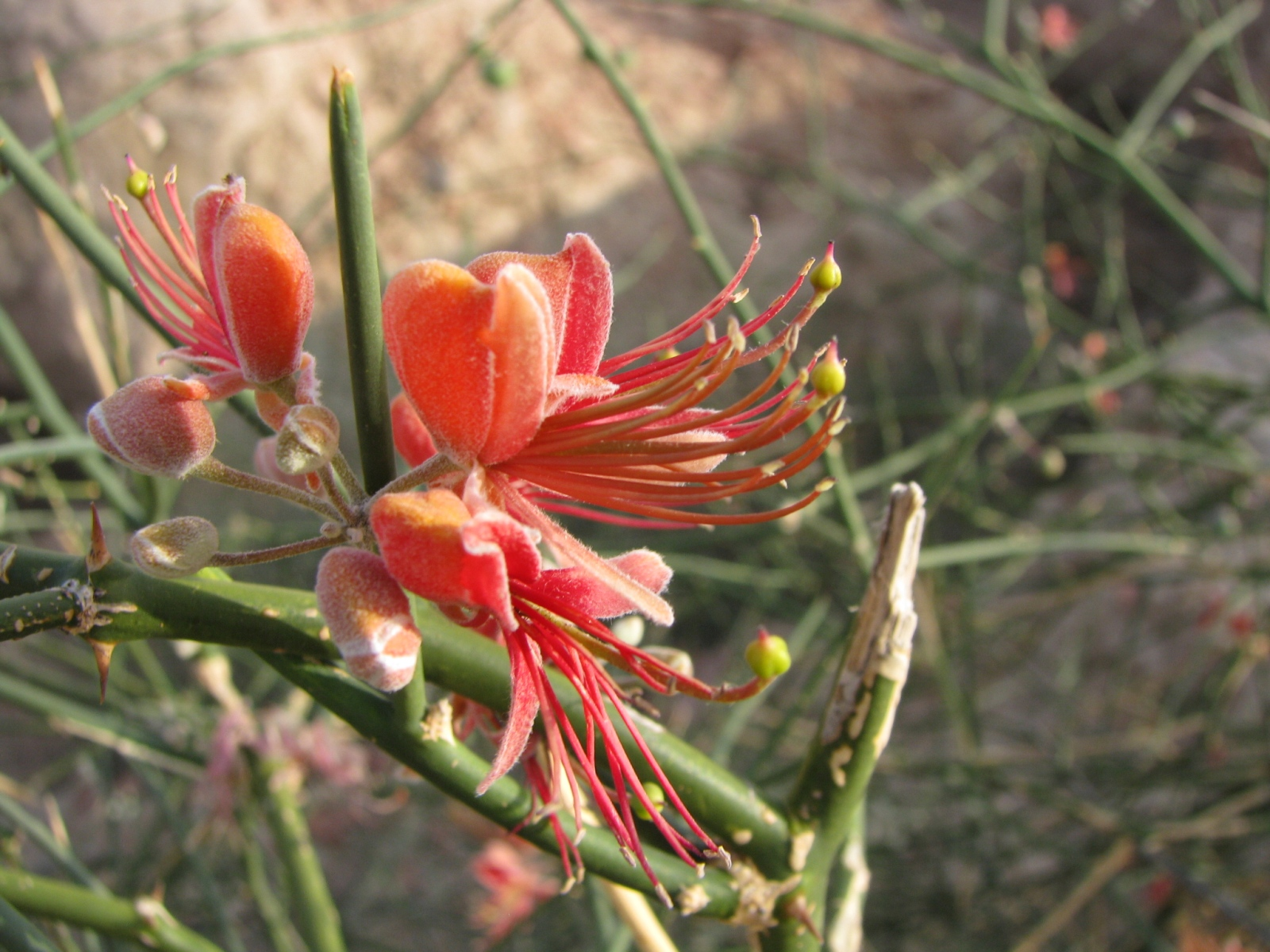
Marot

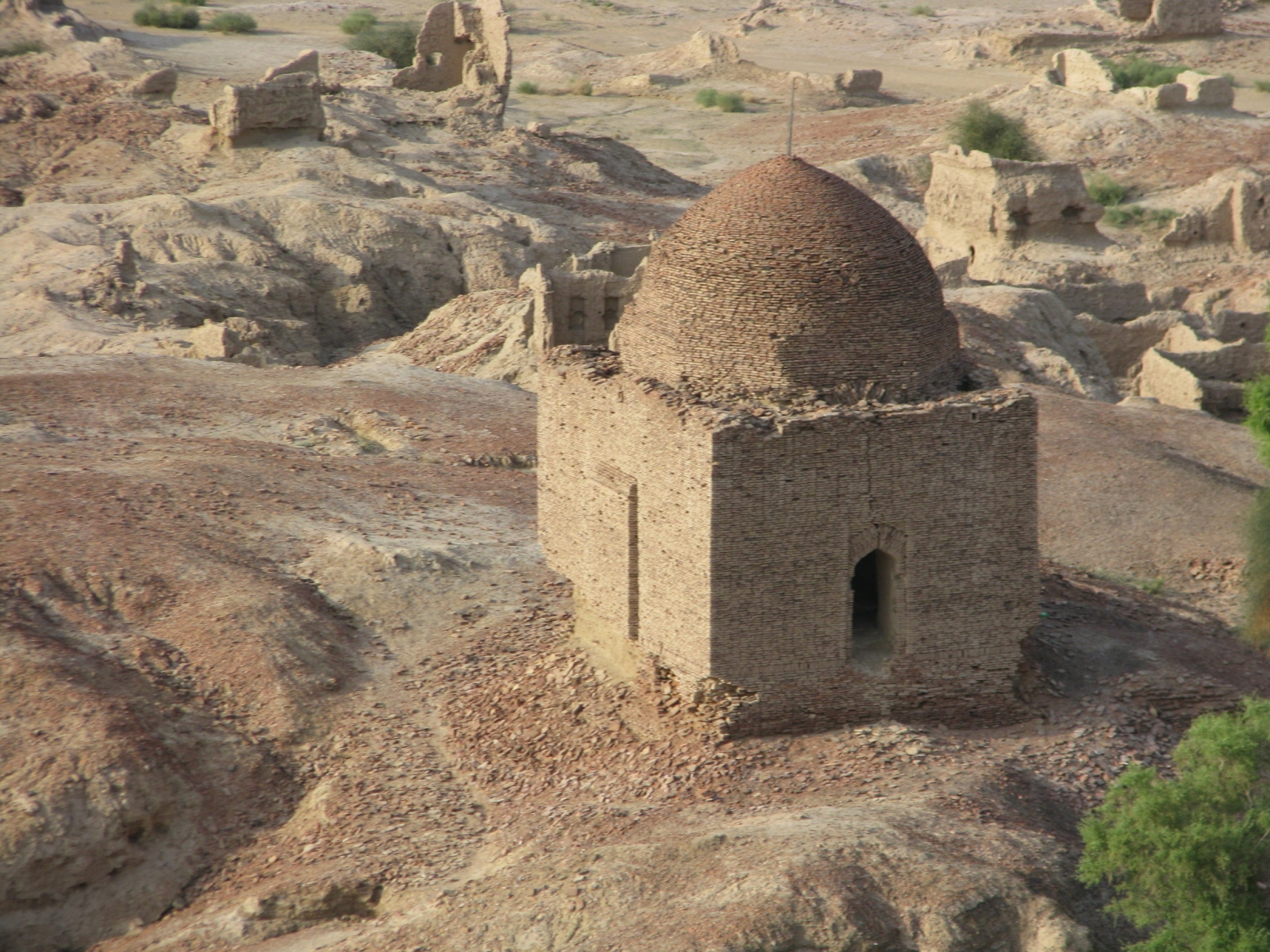
Fort Marot

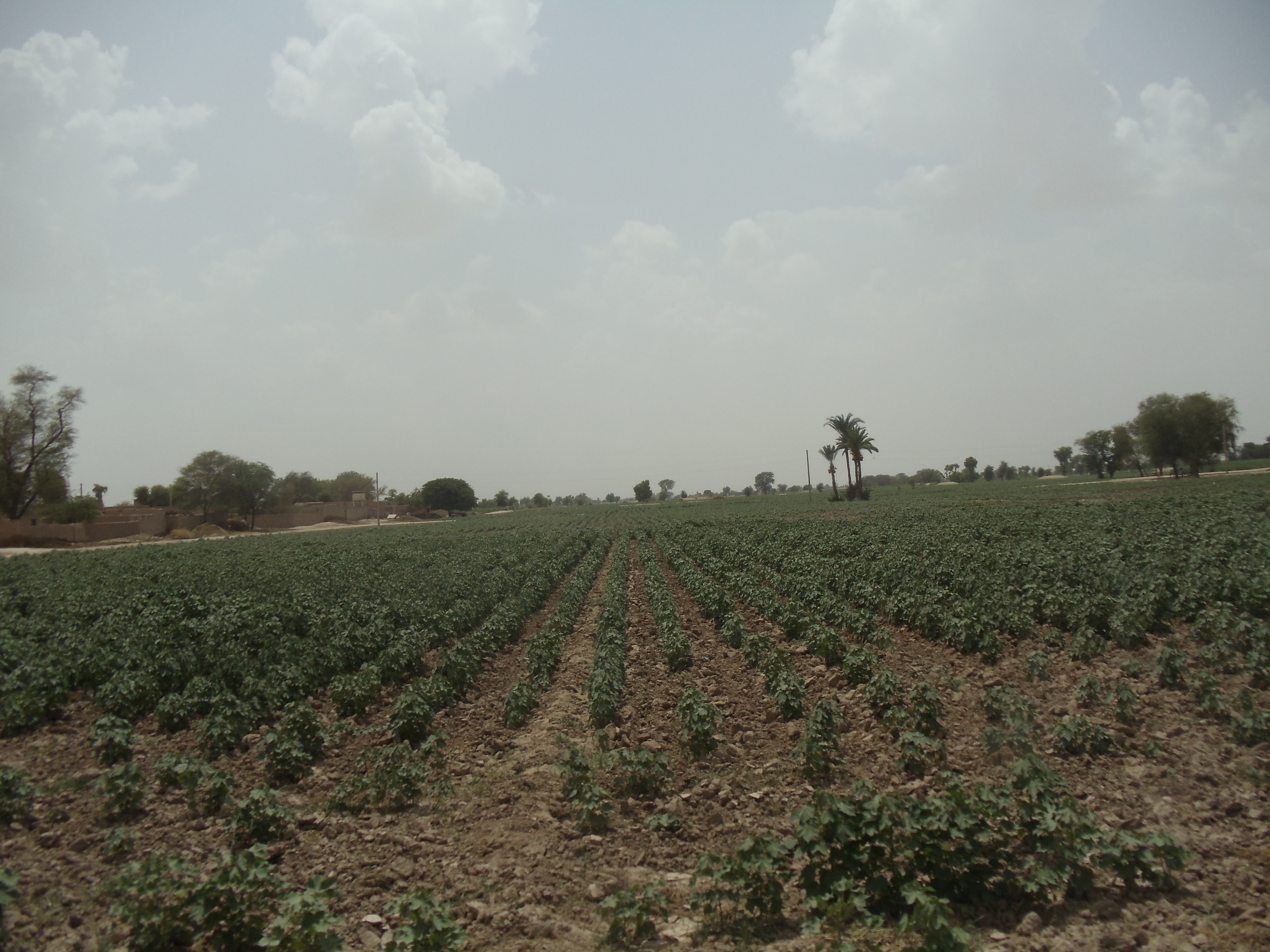
Cotton plant

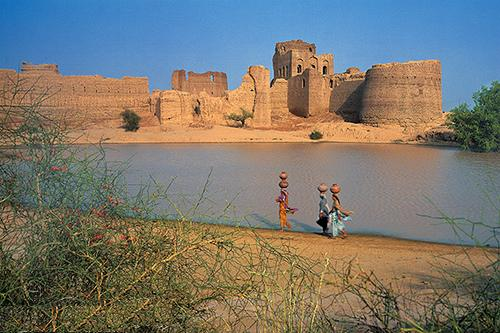
Mojgarh

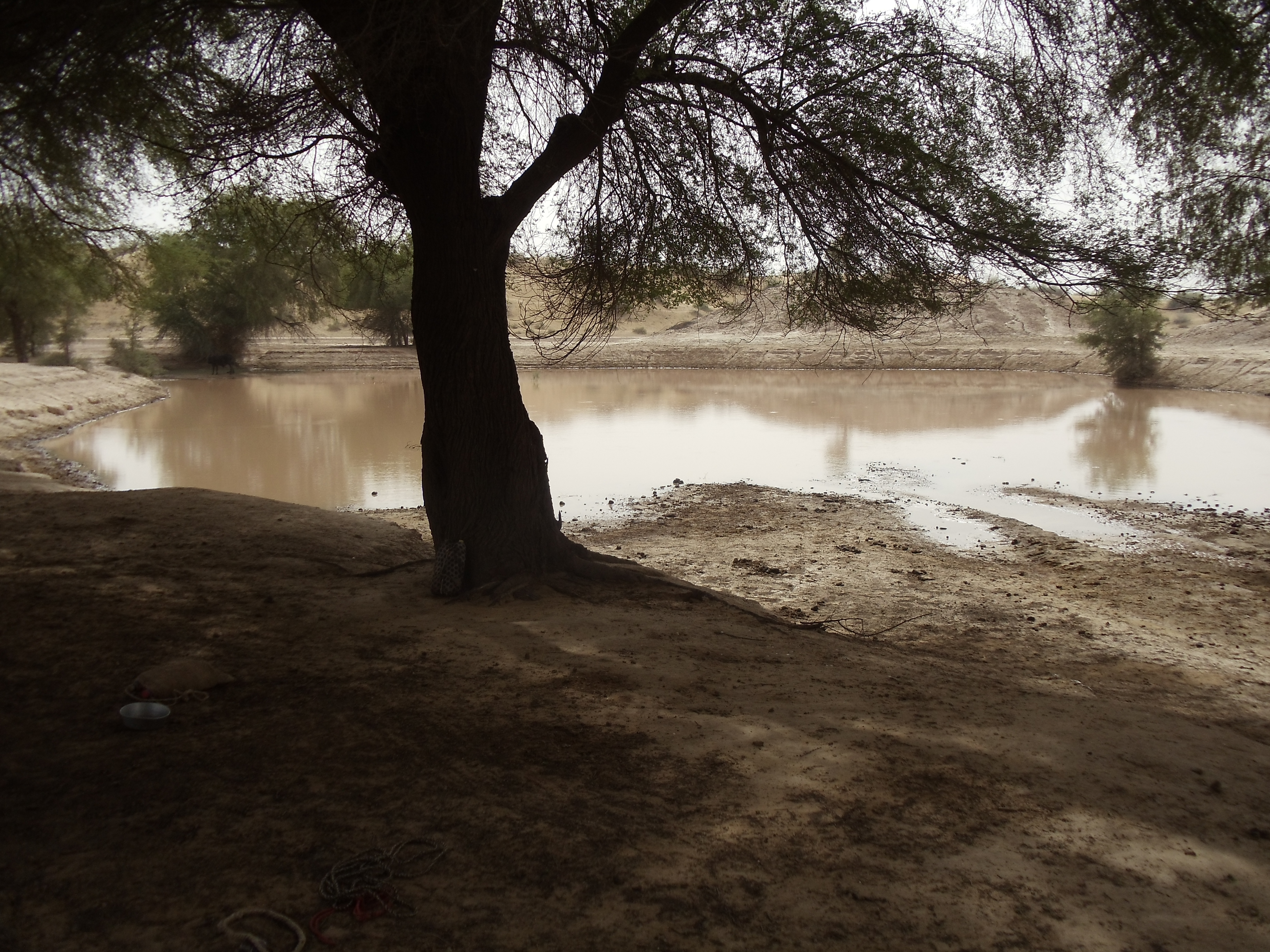
Hakra Canal

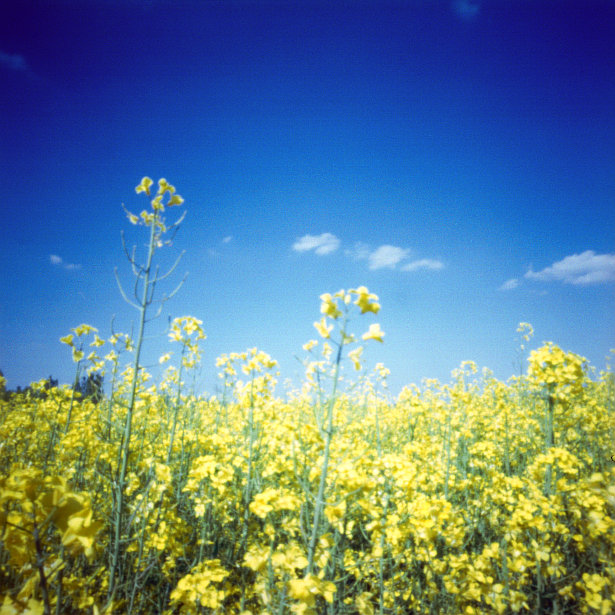
Mustard

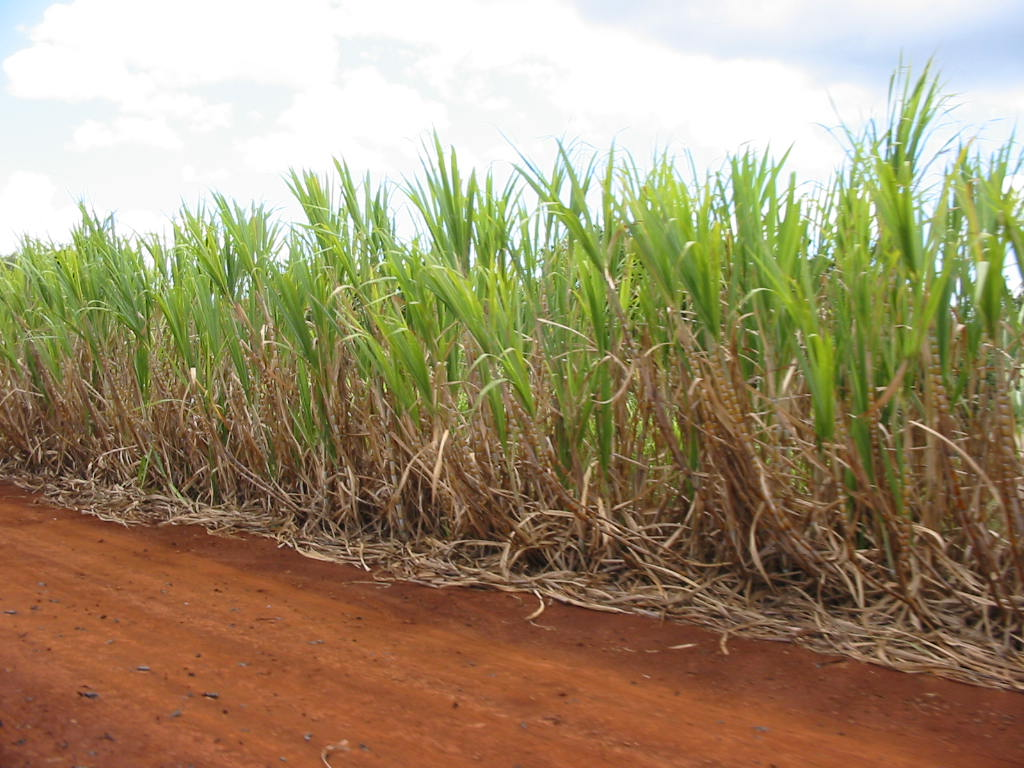
Sugar cane

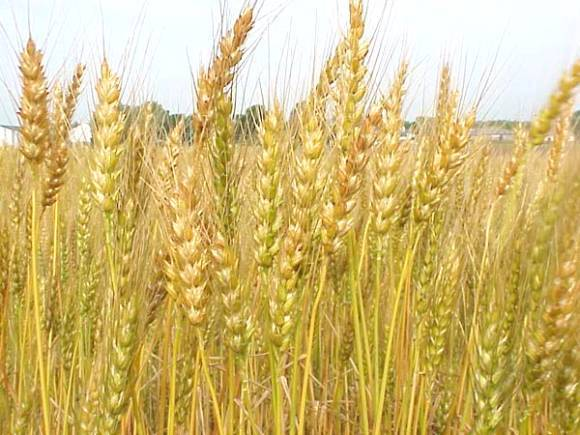
Wheat
