= Vikramaditya Singh of Mewar =

Maharana of Mewar from 1531 to 1536

Rana Vikramaditya
- Rana of Mewar
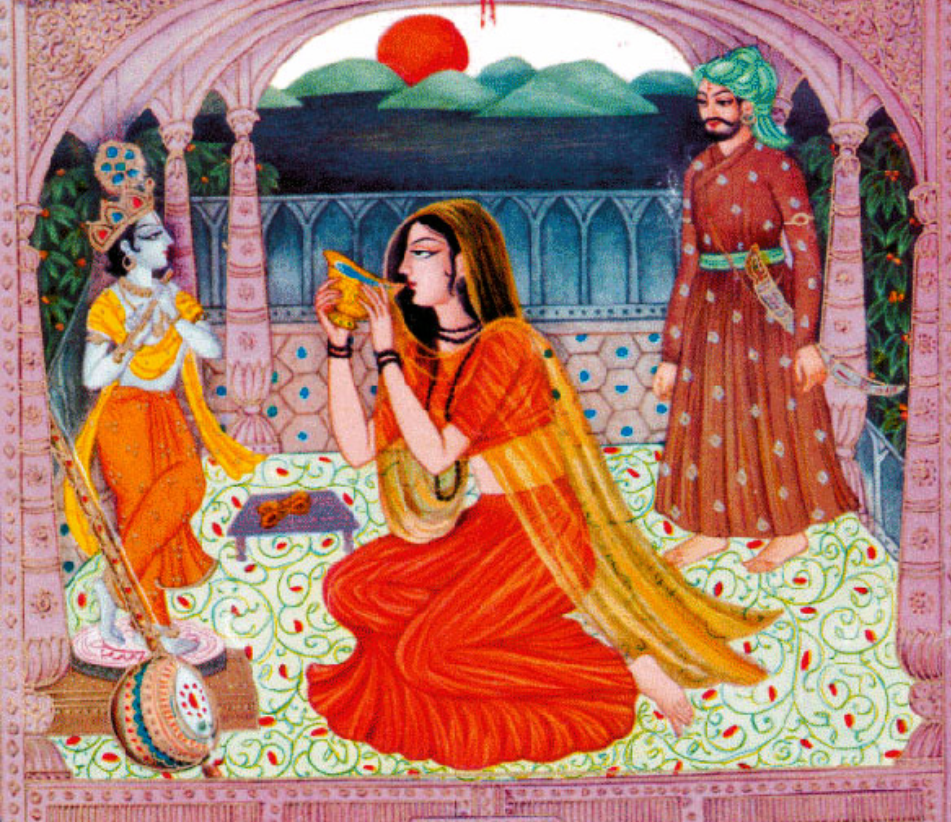
- Vikramaditya portrayed far right, attempting to poison Mirabai

Rana of Mewar
- Reign: 1531–1536
- Predecessor: Ratan Singh II
- Successor: Vanvir Singh
- Regent: Rani Karnavati
- Born: 1517; Chittorgarh Fort
- Died: 1537 (aged 19); Chittorgarh, Mewar
- Spouse: Rathorji Raj Deiji of Marwar Solankiniji Laksh Deiji of
Names
- Rana Vikramaditya Singh Sisodia
- Dynasty: Sisodia
- Father: Rana Sanga
- Mother: Maharani Karmavati Hada (Chauhan) daughter of Rao Nirbudh Singh of Bundi and granddaughter of Rao Narayandas Singh of Bundi.

Rana Vikramaditya (r. 1517–1536) was a Sisodia Rajput ruler of Mewar Kingdom, younger son of Rana Sanga and the elder brother of Rana Udai Singh II. He was unpopular amongst the nobles of Mewar. Vikramaditya neglected the administration of his state that the people nicknamed his reign 'Pappa Bai ka raj' (transl. Lady-father's rule). The Rana is normally addressed as 'Father,' but Vikramaditya was called 'Bai' (lady) because he remained confined to the palace like women.

He was also infamous for his numerous unsuccessful assassinations attempts of Meerabai. During his brief reign, Chittor was captured by Bahadur Shah of Gujarat. However, Bahadur Shah was not able to hold Chittor for long and the Sisodias recaptured it within a short time of his departure.

== Early Life and Reign ==
Vikramaditya was the third son of Rana Sanga and the eldest son of his mother Rani Karnavati. As the third son he was not expected to rule as the heir apparent was his eldest brother Bhoj Raj. Bhoj was married to the famous Krishna devotee Meerabai. After Bhoj's early death however Vikramaditya's second eldest brother Ratan became heir.

After Rana Sanga's death in 1528, Vikramaditya's brother Ratan took the throne. During this time Karnavati took up residence at Ranthambore Fort with her sons, Vikramaditya and Udai. During this time Karnavati named Rao Suraj Mal of Bundi, her cousin (who also happened to be Ratan's brother in law) as Vikramaditya's legal guardian. This naming of guardianship along other factors caused animosity to grow between Rao Suraj and Ratan. This ultimately culminated in Ratan and Suraj Mal killing each other during a hunting excursion in 1531. With Ratan's death Vikramaditya became king.

During his reign, Vikramaditya openly voiced his dislike of his widowed sister-in-law Meerabai's disregard for social and family conventions, through her devotion to Krishna, which involved a passion for music which he considered an insult to upper caste people. According to legend he made multiple attempts to murder Meerabai, which all failed due to the divine intervention of Krishna.

Vikramaditya was deemed a weak ruler. This was due to the fact that Mewar was attacked for the second time by Bahadur Shah of Gujarat, at whose hands Vikramaditya had earlier received a defeat. The antagonized nobles were not ready to fight for Vikramaditya and the imminent battle was predicted to be a great defeat. Rani Karnavati wrote to the nobles to come forward for the sake of the honor of the Sisodias and was able to persuade the nobles to fight for Mewar, if not for Vikramaditya. Their sole condition was that Vikramaditya and his younger brother and heir Udai should go to Bundi during the war for their personal safety. Karnavati agreed to send her sons to Bundi and told her trusted maid Panna Dai to accompany them and take good care of them. Panna was reluctant, but surrendered to the wishes of the queen.

While Vikramaditya was in Bundi, the Sisodias fought valiantly, but they were outnumbered and the war was lost. Bahadur Shah entered Chittorgarh and ransacked it for the second time. Realizing that defeat was imminent, Karnavati and the other noble ladies of the court immolated themselves in Jauhar on March 8, 1535, AD, while all the men donned saffron clothes and went out to fight to the death and thus committed Saka. Bahadur Shah was not able to hold Chittor for long and the Sisodias recaptured it within a short time of his departure.

== Assassination ==
Vikramaditya's temperament had not improved even after the defeat. In 1536, he physically abused a respected old chieftain at the Court. This led the Mewar nobles to place Vikramaditya under palace arrest, leaving Udai Singh as heir-elect to the throne. Vanvir Singh sought out to turn Vikramaditya's soldiers against him and succeeded. Vanvir allegedly, the illegitimate son of Udai Singh's uncle, Prithviraj considered himself to be the rightful heir to the throne. In 1537 (some books mention in 1536 as well), he conducted a festival called the "Deepdan" and used it to his full advantage. While the whole kingdom was celebrating the festival, he found this the right time and assassinated the imprisoned Vikramaditya, then hurried towards the rawala to get rid of the only remaining barrier to his ambition, the 14-year-old Maharana-elect, Udai Singh, in which he failed due to Panna Dai's alertness, patriotism and loyalty.

== See also ==
- Siege of Chittorgarh (1533–1535)

== Bibliography ==
- Banerji, S. K. (7 February 2018) [1938]. Humayun Badshah. Creative Media Partners, LLC. ISBN 978-1-376-97373-0.

Vikramaditya Singh of Mewar Sisodia Rajput Clan Born: 1517 Died: 1537
Preceded by Ratan Singh II	Sisodia Rajput Ruler; 1531–1537	Succeeded by Udai Singh II
