= Battle of Mandrael =

1534 battle in Rajasthan between the Mughals and Gujarat

- Part of Mughal–Afghan Wars
Date	November 1534
Location	Mandrayal, near Bayana, Rajasthan 26°18′9.5″N 77°14′22″E
Result	Mughal victory
Territorial changes	Status quo ante bellum

Belligerents
Mughal Empire	Gujarat Sultanate; Lodi dynasty

Commanders and leaders
Mirza Askari; Hindal Mirza; Yadgar Nasir Mirza; Qasim Hussain Sultan; Mir Faquir Ali; Zahid Beg; Dost Beg	Tatar Khan Lodi †

Strength
5,000	Initially 40,000; approx. 3,000 after desertions

Casualties and losses
Unknown	Heavy; approx. 300 killed
- Location within Rajasthan Battle of Mandrael (India)

The Battle of Mandrael (also spelled Mandrel) was fought in November 1534 at Mandrayal, near Bayana, in present-day Rajasthan. It took place between the forces of Tatar Khan Lodi, a Lodi claimant supported by Sultan Bahadur Shah of Gujarat Sultanate and the Mughal army sent by Emperor Humayun.

As part of Bahadur Shah's plan to distract Humayun while he completed the siege of Chittor, Tatar Khan advanced with 40,000 mercenaries and occupied Bayana. Humayun responded by despatching an army under Mirza Askari, Hindal Mirza and other commanders with 18,000 troops. Many of Tatar Khan's mercenaries deserted, leaving him with only 3,000 men. Hindal Mirza checked him at Mandrayal with 5,000 troops. Tatar Khan was killed along with most of his remaining followers. The Mughal victory ended the main threat and forced the other invading contingents to withdraw.

== Background ==
Many Afghans of Northern India and Mughals claimants of the throne sought asylum at the court of Bahadur Shah. In 1530 AD, Fateh Khan, Qutb Khan and Omar Khan fled to Gujarat after their defeat at the Battle of Ghaghra and sought refuge with Sultan Bahadur. According to Firishta, they were relatives of Sultan Bahlul Lodi. After Humayun's accession, Alam Khan Jigat, a relative of Sikandar Lodi, grew dissatisfied against the Mughals. He was expelled from Kalpi on suspicion of rebellion. He arrived in Gujarat with 12,000 cavalry and 200 elephants and was granted asylum by Sultan Bahadur. Alam Khan Lodi, brother of Sultan Sikandar and uncle of Ibrahim Lodi, was another prominent refugee. He had earlier joined Babur in an attempt to overthrow his nephew. Later he rebelled against him and was imprisoned. He managed to escape and reached Gujarat. He still claimed the throne of Delhi and sought Bahadur Shah's assistance. This son Tatar Khan Lodi sought Sultan Bahadur's assistance to recover it. While early relations between Bahadur Shah and Humayun remained cordial, tension arose as Mughal and Afghan dissidents mislead the Sultan, claiming the Mughal army had grown pampered and ease-loving. Bahadur Shah also harboured imperialistic policy. According to Firishta, he began assigning districts of Delhi to his own officers. In 1533, Bahadur Shah besieged Chittor. Rani Karnavati sought Humayun's help who marched to Gwalior but could not offer any assistance. Humayun's action offended Sultan Bahadur. He planned a three-pronged invasion of the Mughal empire to distract the emperor's attention so that the conquest of Chittor could be completed.

== Battle ==
Tatar Khan soon mustered force of 40,000 mercenaries. Sultan Bahadur specifically ordered him not to engage in combat until the Sultan himself arrived. Alam Khan received a contingent with orders cause disturbance in Kalinjar not yet fully subjugated by Humayun. Bahadur Shah expected the local Hindu raja to support him against the Mughals who had invaded the territories. Burhan-ul-Mulk was dispatched with forces with similar task in the Punjab. Imad-ul-Mulk was instructed to stay at Ajmer. The overall plan also included a simultaneous attack on Bihar and the neighbouring region. Tatar Khan advanced on Agra and occupied Bayana without resistance. He sent parties to ravage vicinity of Agra. At Kanauj, Humayun received news of the invasions in Bayana, Kalinjar and the Punjab. Realising that Tatar Khan's force formed the main strength of the attack, he decided to crush it first. He hurriedly reached Agra and sent Mirza Askari, Hindal Mirza, Yadgar Nasir, Qasim Hussain Sultan, Mir Faqir Ali, Ali Zahid Beg and Dost Beg with 18,000 men to suppress the rising. They recovered Bayana forcing Tatar Khan to retreat to Mandrael. As soon as the Mughal troops approached, Tatar Khan's mercenaries began to desert in large numbers. Only 3,000 men remained with him. He spent heavily to stop the desertions, but they continued. Hindal advanced from Bayana with 5,000 Mughal troops. Tatar Khan resolved to fight, hoping for support from the people of Delhi and believing that either Humayun or Bahadur Shah would be defeated, allowing him to dictate terms and seize Delhi. In the ensuing battle with the Mughals in November 1534, he fought desperately but was killed along with about 300 of his followers. The Mughal forces completely routed his army thus securing victory.

== Aftermath ==
After the death of Tatar Khan, the invading forces at Kalinjar and Punjab abandoned their positions. They returned back to Gujarat. Humayun retained Bayana. In the meantime, Bahadur Shah succeeded capturing Chittor.

== See also ==
- Battle of Bayana
- Battle of Hisar Firoza
- Battle of Chausa

== Bibliography ==
- Chaube, J. (1975). History of Gujarat Kingdom, 1458-1537. Munshiram Manoharlal Publishers. ISBN 978-0-88386-573-6.
- Banerji, S. K. (2018-02-07) [1938]. Humayun Badshah. Creative Media Partners, LLC. ISBN 978-1-376-97373-0.
- Prasad, Ishwari (1956). The Life and Times of Humayun. Orient Longmans.
