= Chittorgarh =

- City
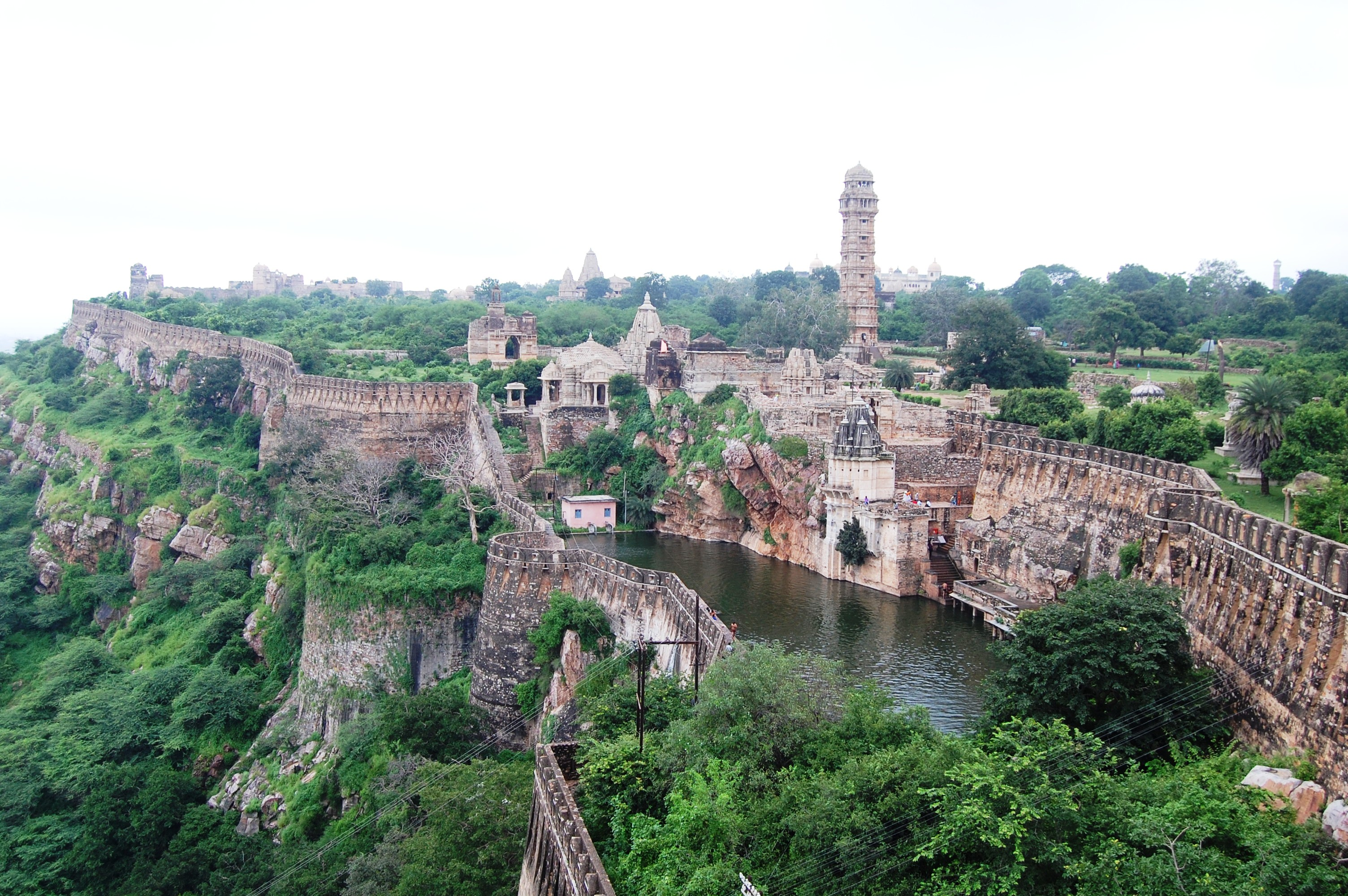
- Chittor Fort, Chittorgarh
- Interactive map of Chittorgarh
- Location in Rajasthan, India Chittorgarh (India)
- Coordinates: 24.88°N 74.63°E
- Country: India
- State: Rajasthan
- District: Chittorgarh
- Established: 650 A.D.
- Founder: Chitrangada Mori
- Named for: Chitrangada Mori

Government
  - Body: Chittorgarh Municipal Council

Area
  - Total: 41 km^{2} (16 sq mi)
- Elevation: 394.6 m (1,295 ft)

Population (2011)
  - Total: 116,406
  - Rank: 91
  - Density: 2,800/km^{2} (7,400/sq mi)

Languages
  - Official: Hindi
  - Additional official: English
  - Spoken: Mewari, Rajasthani
- Time zone: UTC+5:30 (IST)
- PIN: 312001
- Area code(s): +91-1472-XXXXXX
- Vehicle registration: RJ-09
- Website: www.chittorgarh.rajasthan.gov.in

Chittorgarh (Hindi pronunciation: [t͡ʃɪt̪ːɔːɽ.gəɽʱ]; also Chitror, Chittor or Chittaurgarh) is a major city in the state of Rajasthan in western India. It lies on the Berach River, a tributary of the Banas, and is the administrative headquarters of Chittorgarh District. It was a major stronghold of the Rajput State of Medapata (modern Mewar). The city of Chittorgarh is located on the banks of the rivers Gambhiri and Berach.

Chittorgarh is home to the Chittor Fort, one of the largest forts in India and Asia. It was sacked thrice: first in 1303 by Alauddin Khalji, again in 1535 by Bahadur Shah of Gujarat, and lastly by the Mughal Emperor Akbar in 1568. Chittor is known for the veneration of Meera, and was the home of Panna Dai and Rani Padmini.

Religions in Chittorgarh
Hinduism	80.45%
Islam	14.12%
Jainism	4.27%
Sikhism	.48%
Christianity	.2%
Distribution of religions

== Geography ==
Chittorgarh is located at 24.88°N 74.63°E in southern Rajasthan. It has an average elevation of 394 metres (1,293 ft). The district encompasses 350.8 square km (3.17 per cent of the Rajasthan State).

== History ==
Chittor has a history going back several centuries. It was an ancient centre of Jain tradition. Chittor is adjacent to the ancient city of Madhyamika. The Jain inscriptions at Mathura from the Kushana period (1st–3rd centuries CE) mention a "Majjhimilla" branch of the "Kottiya" gana, indicating that it was a major Jain centre. The famous Acharya Haribhadra Suri (6th century CE) was born in Chittor and wrote "Dhurtopakhyana" there.

Originally called Chitrakuta, the Chittor Fort is said to have been built in the 7th century by Chitranga, a Mori king.

The Guhila (Gahlot) ruler Bappa Rawal is said to have captured the fort in either 728 CE or 734 CE. However, some historians doubt the historicity of this legend, arguing that the Guhilas did not control Chittor before the reign of the later ruler Allata.

Between 1251 and 1258, Balban repeatedly led troops to Chittor fort. Under the orders of Alauddin Khilji, Ulugh Khan laid siege to Ranthambore, Chittor and Bundi forts.

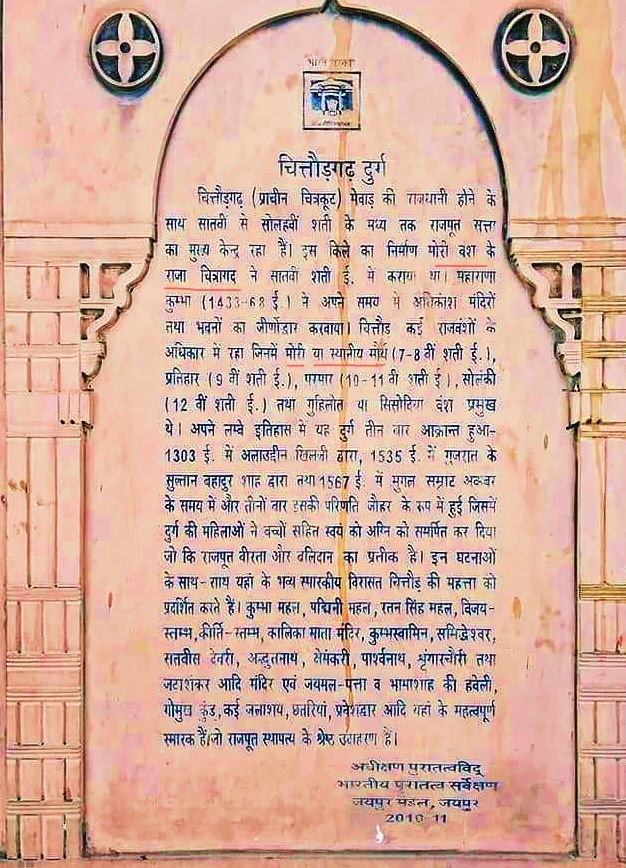
ASI board at Chittorgarh Fort stating that the fort was originally built by the Mori rulers, who are claimed to be a branch of the Mauryan dynasty.

In 1303, the Delhi Sultanate ruler Alauddin Khilji defeated the Guhila king Ratnasimha, and captured the fort. The fort was later captured by Hammir Singh, a king of the Sisodia branch of the Guhilas. Chittor gained prominence during the period of his successors, which included Rana Kumbha and Rana Sanga. In 1535, Bahadur Shah of Gujarat besieged and conquered the fort. However, Bahadur Shah was not able to hold Chittor for long, and the Sisodias captured it within a short time of his departure.

In 1567–68, the Mughal emperor Akbar besieged and captured the fort. In 1615, as part of a peace treaty between Akbar's successor Jahangir and the Maharana of Mewar, Amar Singh I, Mewar accepted Mughal suzerainty and the fort as well as the areas surrounding Chittorgarh were given to Mewar. However, due to the military danger presented by the fort, it was never to be fortified or even repaired.

The Maasir-i-Alamgiri, written by Saqi Must'ad Khan under Mughal patronage, chronicles the reign of Aurangzeb and records that on February 22, 1680 (1st Safar, 1091 AH), the emperor ordered the destruction of 63 Hindu temples in and around the city of Chittorgarh.

=== Climate ===
The climate is a tropical savanna climate (Koppen: Aw), showing traits of a humid subtropical climate (Koppen: Cwa), narrowly being precluded from being a semi-arid climate (Koppen: BSh), with almost all its rainfall occurring during the summer monsoon.

Climate data for Chittorgarh (1991–2020, extremes 1973–2020)
Month	Jan	Feb	Mar	Apr	May	Jun	Jul	Aug	Sep	Oct	Nov	Dec	Year
Record high °C (°F)	32.7 (90.9)	37.5 (99.5)	41.5 (106.7)	45.2 (113.4)	47.5 (117.5)	46.3 (115.3)	42.5 (108.5)	36.9 (98.4)	39.9 (103.8)	40.0 (104.0)	38.0 (100.4)	34.5 (94.1)	47.5 (117.5)
Mean daily maximum °C (°F)	24.2 (75.6)	28.0 (82.4)	33.8 (92.8)	38.6 (101.5)	41.4 (106.5)	39.0 (102.2)	33.1 (91.6)	31.3 (88.3)	33.2 (91.8)	34.4 (93.9)	30.2 (86.4)	26.5 (79.7)	32.7 (90.9)
Mean daily minimum °C (°F)	6.9 (44.4)	9.7 (49.5)	15.2 (59.4)	20.6 (69.1)	25.5 (77.9)	26.4 (79.5)	24.6 (76.3)	23.4 (74.1)	21.9 (71.4)	17.3 (63.1)	12.0 (53.6)	8.0 (46.4)	17.5 (63.5)
Record low °C (°F)	−0.1 (31.8)	0.3 (32.5)	3.8 (38.8)	12.1 (53.8)	16.2 (61.2)	17.2 (63.0)	18.5 (65.3)	18.8 (65.8)	12.4 (54.3)	6.4 (43.5)	3.5 (38.3)	0.2 (32.4)	−0.1 (31.8)
Average rainfall mm (inches)	4.3 (0.17)	2.7 (0.11)	1.8 (0.07)	6.3 (0.25)	11.7 (0.46)	95.8 (3.77)	296.8 (11.69)	270.8 (10.66)	114.5 (4.51)	12.0 (0.47)	4.9 (0.19)	0.5 (0.02)	822.1 (32.37)
Average rainy days	0.2	0.4	0.3	0.8	0.9	4.8	11.9	10.7	5.1	0.8	0.5	0.1	36.5
Average relative humidity (%) (at 17:30 IST)	42	35	26	22	25	42	66	72	62	41	44	45	44
Source: India Meteorological Department

== Festivals ==
Maharana was born on May 9, 1540, in Kumbhalgarh in Rajsamand district of Rajasthan to Maharana Udai Singh II and Maharani Jaivanta Bai Songara. His birth anniversary (Maharana Pratap Jayanti) is celebrated as a festival every year on the 3rd day of Jyestha Shukla phase.

Special puja and processions are held in his remembrance on Maharana Pratap Jayanti day. Several cultural programmes, such as debate, are also organized.

=== Meera Mahotsav ===
Meera Bai (1498–1547), or Mirabai, was a devout follower of Krishna, one of the foremost exponents of the Prema Bhakti (Divine Love) and an inspired poet. She was a Rajput princess born in about 1498 in Medta, Rajasthan. Her father, Ratan Singh, was the youngest son of Rao Duda, ruler of Medta, and son of Rao Duda, the ruler and founder of Jodhpur. Ratan Singh belonged to the Rathore clan. She was married to Bhoj Raj, ruler of Chittor.

Meera Smrithi Sansathan (Meera Memorial Trust), along with the Chittorgarh district officials, organises Meera Mahotsav every year. The celebration begins on Sharad Purnima, Mirabai's birthday, and lasts for 3 days. Many famous musicians and singers get together to sing bhajans in this celebration. The 3-day celebration also features pujas, discussions, dances, and fireworks.

=== Teej ===
Teej, the festival of swings, is one of the major festivals in Chittorgarh.It marks the advent of the monsoon month of Shravan (August). The monsoon rains fall on the parched land, and the pleasing scent of the wet soil rises into the air. Swings are hung from trees and decorated with flowers. Young girls and women dressed in green clothes sing songs in celebration of the advent of the monsoon. This festival is dedicated to the Goddess Parvati, commemorating her union with Shiva. Parvati is worshipped by seekers of conjugal bliss and happiness.

=== Gangaur ===
The Gangaur Festival is a colourful and important local festival in Rajasthan. In July and August, it is observed throughout the state by women who worship Parvati. The name "Gangaur" refers to Gan (a synonym for Shiva) and Gauri (a synonym for Parvati). Gauri symbolises saubhagya (marital bliss), and is the embodiment of perfection and conjugal love. Unmarried women worship her in order to be blessed with good husbands; married women worship her for the welfare, health, and long life of their spouses and a happy married life.

=== Jauhar Mela ===
The fort and the city of Chittorgarh host a large annual Rajput festival called the Jauhar Mela, which commemorates the jauhars, when Rajput women burned themselves alive to avoid capture in war. It is generally believed that it marks the anniversary Padmini's jauhar, which is the most famous such occurrence. This festival is held primarily to commemorate the bravery of Rajput ancestors and all three jauhars which happened at Chittorgarh Fort. A large number of Rajputs, including the descendants of most of the princely families, hold a procession to celebrate the jauhars. It has also become a forum to air one's views on the current political situation in the country.

=== Rang Teras, the Tribal Fair ===
Rang Teras is a popular tribal fest of Mewar celebrated on the 13th night of the month of Chaitra. Rang Teras has been celebrated since the 15th century with colourful fairs and tribes gathering together to rejoice in the harvest of wheat. It is a thanksgiving festival for farmers, who honour Mother Earth for providing them with food every year.

== Industries ==
The city's industrial sector can be divided into:

1. Northern sector – Chanderiya Lead-Zinc Smelter is one of the largest zinc-lead smelting complexes in the world. Its current metal production capacity is 610,000 tonnes per annum (525,000 tonnes per annum of zinc and 85,000 tonnes per annum of lead). In the year ended March 2013, Chanderiya produced 443,000 MT of zinc and 60,000 MT of lead. The main products are special high-grade (SHG) zinc, continuous galvanising grade (CGG) zinc, prime western (PW) zinc, and pure lead. It also produces several valuable by-products, including silver and cadmium.
2. Southern sector – Indore road (Nimbahera road) - many big cement players such as Aditya Birla group, Ultratech cement, Wonder cement by RK group, JK Lakshmi cement, Lafarge Cement are among the major industries of the southern industrial complex of the city. In the northern part of the city, Birla Cement Works (MP Birla group) also boasts one of the biggest cement plants in the country.
3. Northern Marble sector – The second biggest marble production hub of Rajasthan, after Kishangarh, Chittorgarh has one of the biggest production and finishing industries and marble complexes, and also a major exporter centre for marble in the country. RIICO Industrial Area at the bypass road and RIICO Industrial Area Chanderiya are big marble industry compounds. All kinds of marble, like onyx, Italian marble, Kota stone, famous white marble of Rajasthan, are in abundance.

Manpura mines are also a major mining area. The city also boasts of big marble mines.

1. Far north – Soniyana textile industrial area is the newest development in the city in the past 10 years.

== Places of interest ==
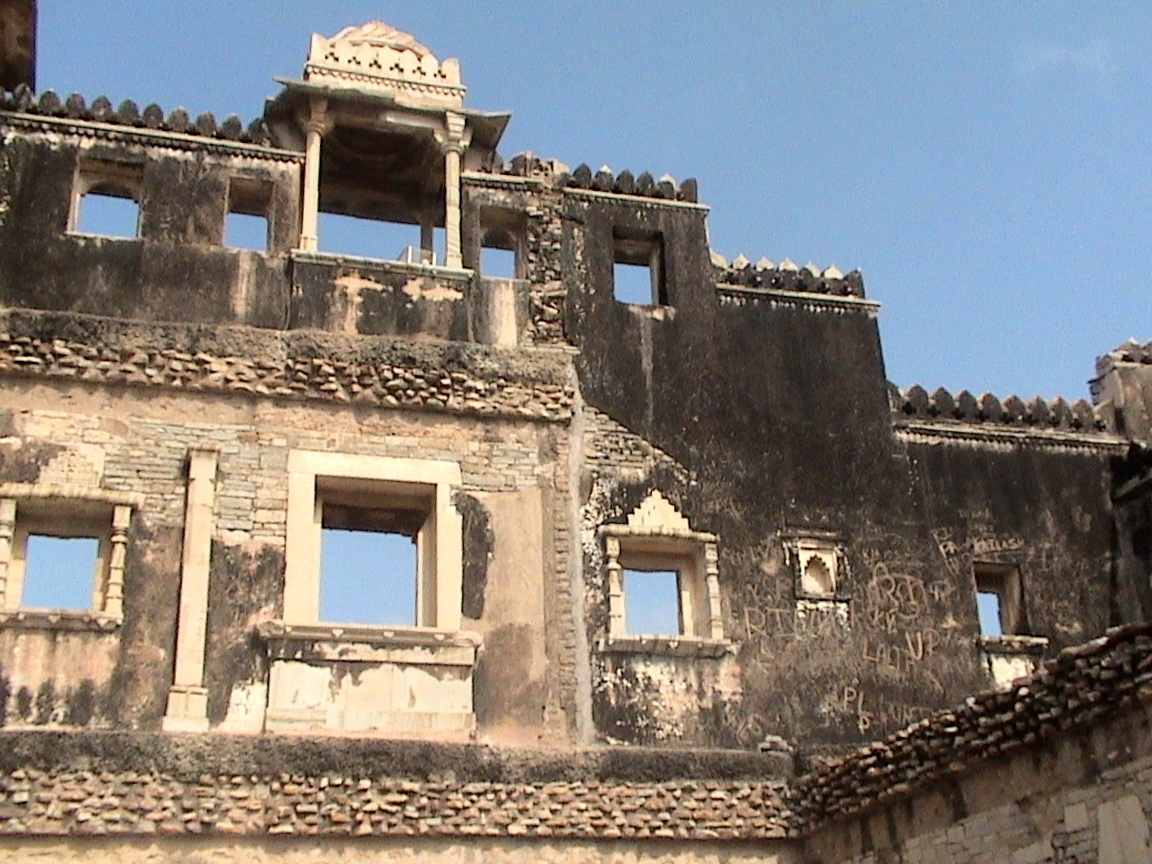
Chittorgarh fort inside

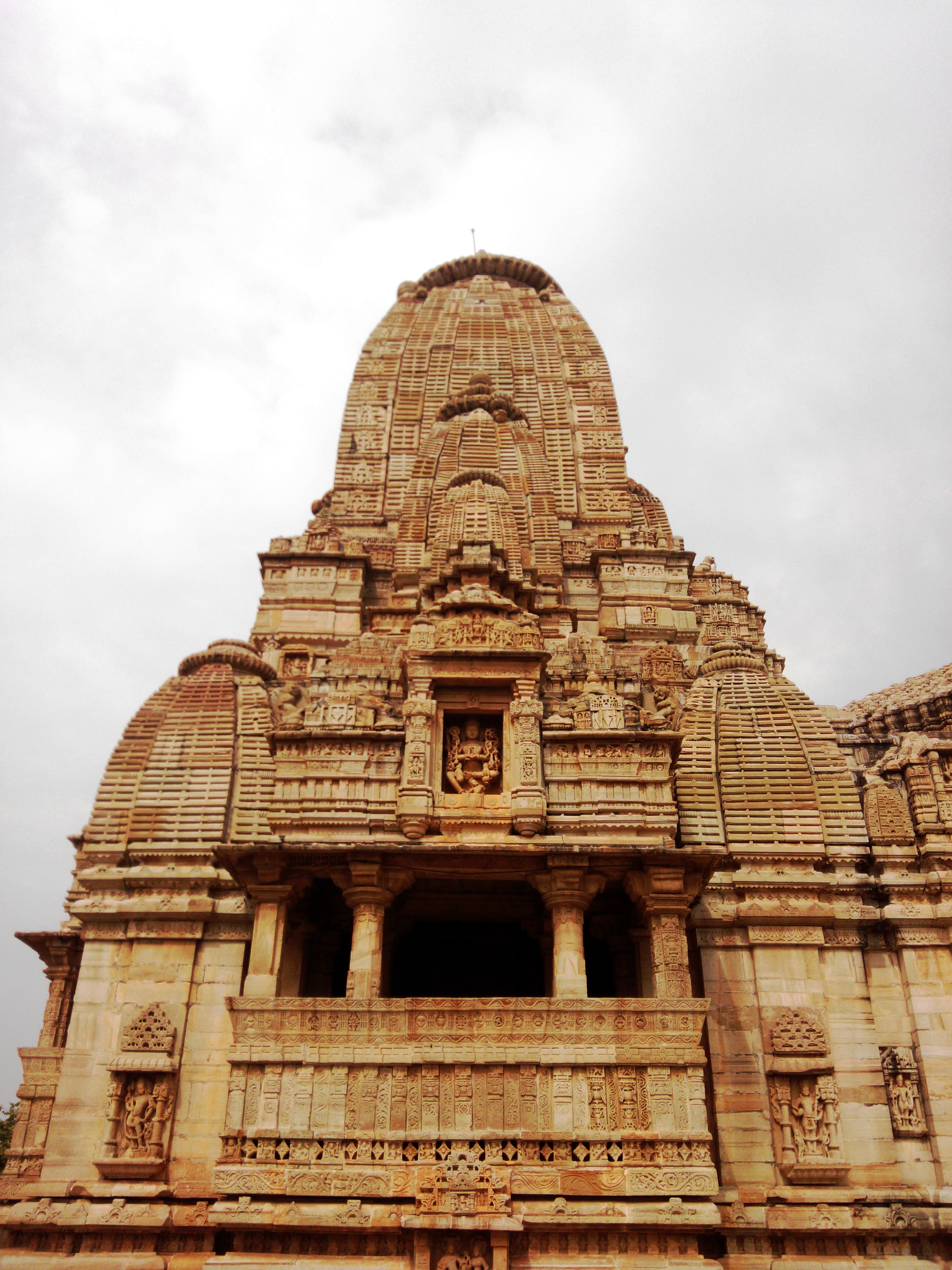
Temple inside Chittorgarh fort

=== Chittorgarh Fort ===
The Chittor Fort is seated on a 180-metre hill, covering an expanse of 700 acres (2.8 km^{2}). It was constructed by the Mauryans in the 7th century CE. There is also a belief that it was constructed by Bhima of the Pancha Pandavas. This fort was the citadel of many great Rajput warriors such as Gora, Badal, Rana Kumbha, Maharana Pratap, Jaimal, Patta, etc.

==== Architectural Features of Chittorgarh Fort ====
The Chittorgarh Fort contains towers, reservoirs, and other architectural elements, as pictured below:

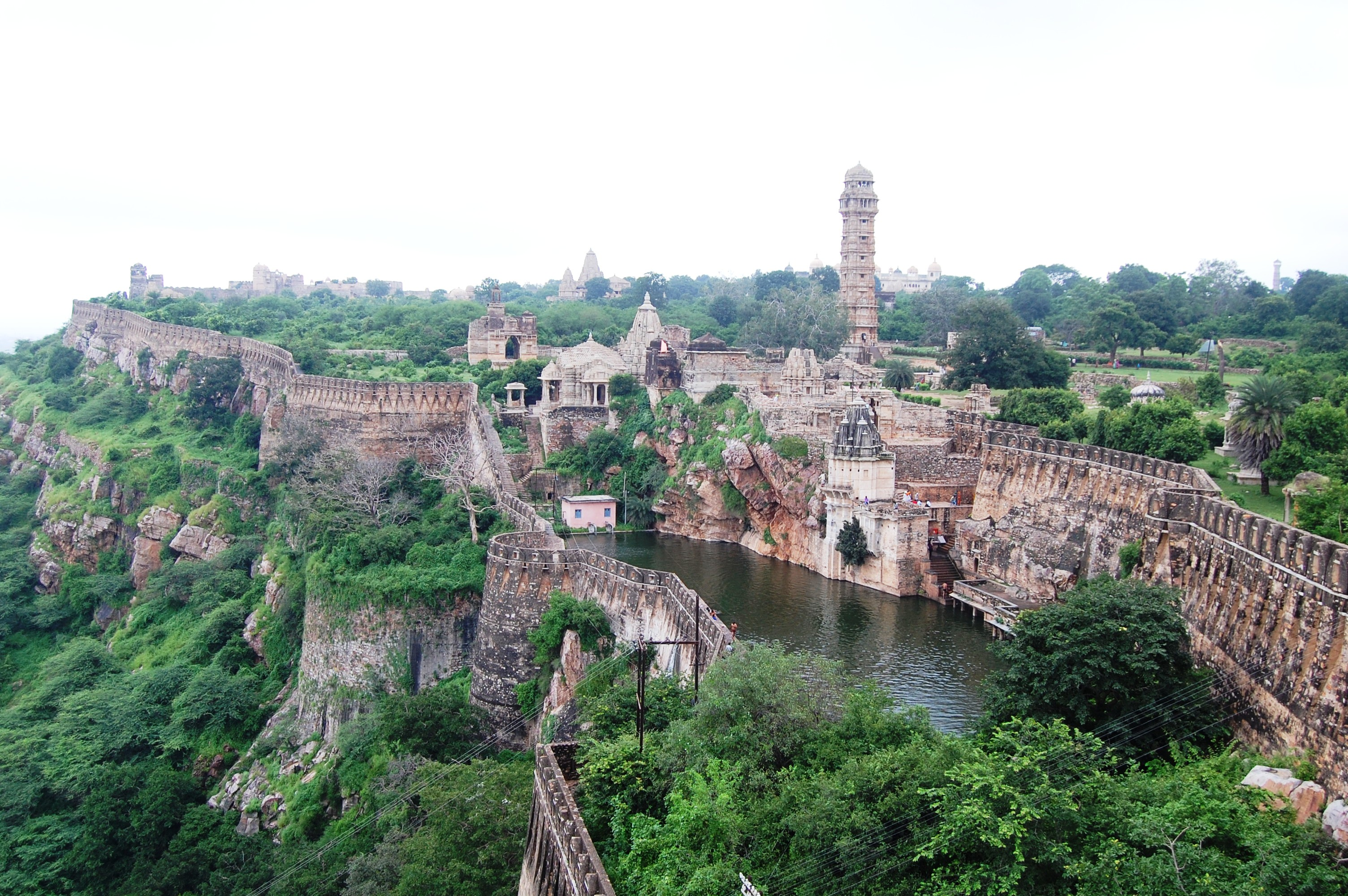
Chittor Fort – A panoramic view of the historic fort.

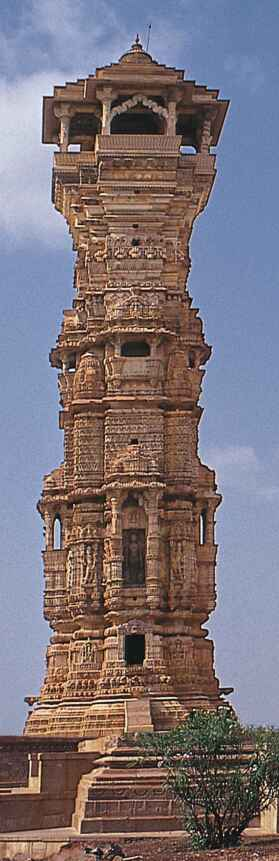
Kirti Stambha (Tower of Fame) – A Jain monument within the fort.

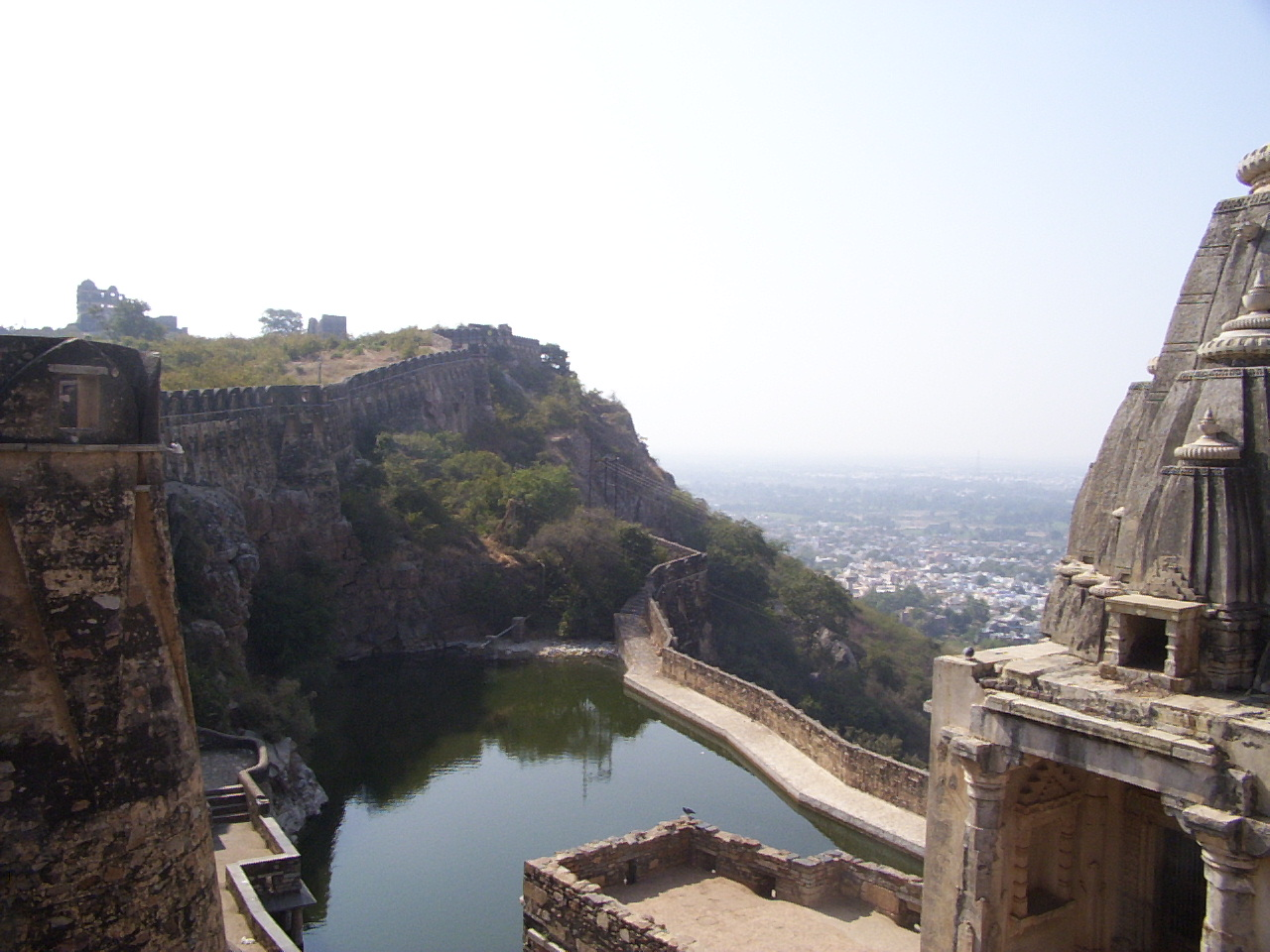
Fort Reservoir – One of the fort's water systems.

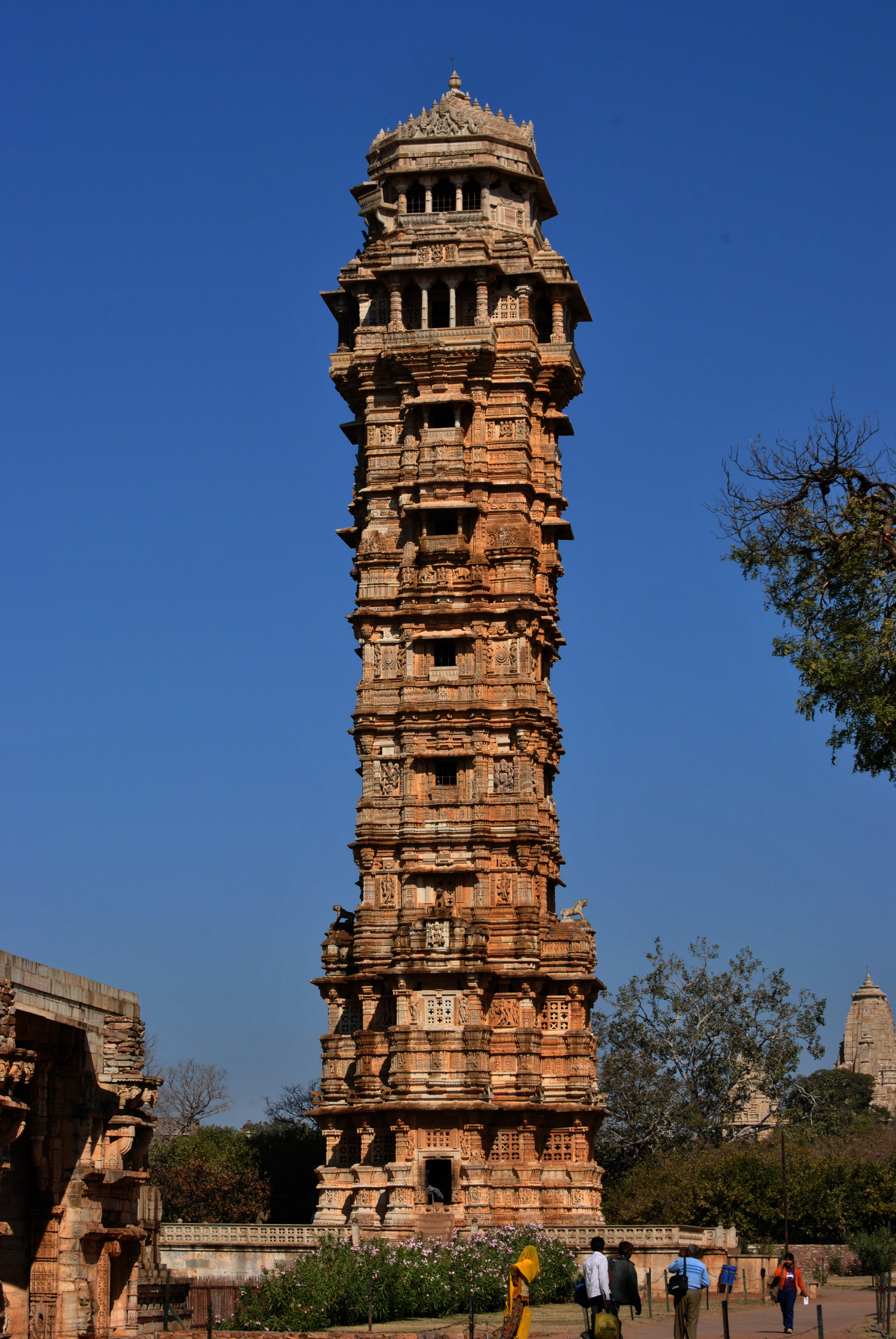
Vijaya Stambha (Tower of Victory) – Built to commemorate Rana Kumbha's victory.

==== Kirti Stambh ====
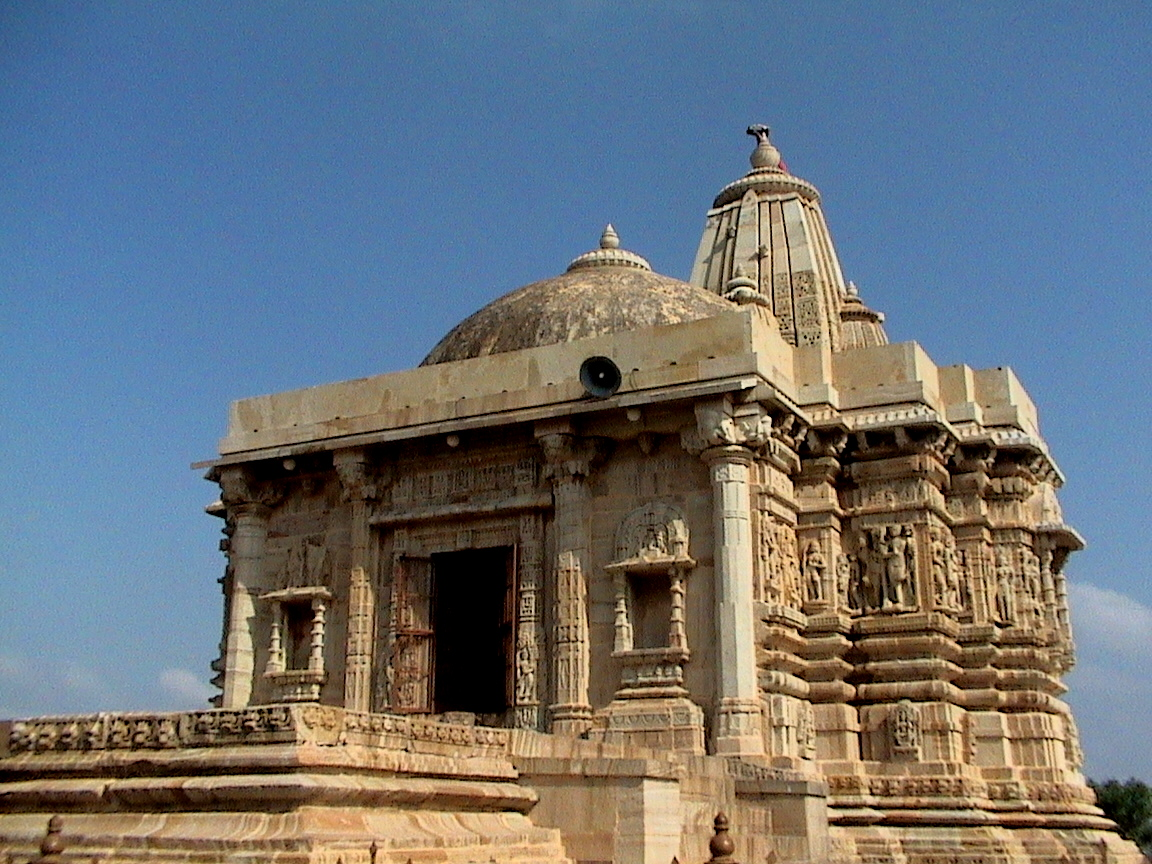
Jain temple at Kirtistambha

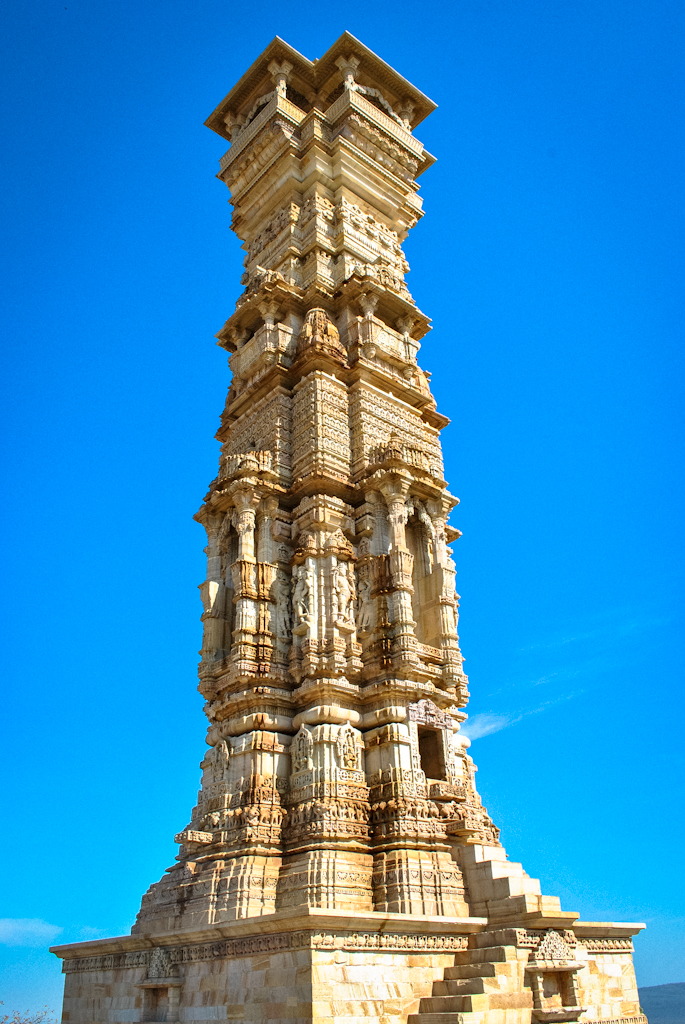
Jain Kirti Stambha

Kirti Stambh (Tower of Fame) is a 22-meter-high (72-foot) tower built in the 12th century CE. Kirti Stambh is built inside the Chittorgarh fort. It is dedicated to Rishabha, the first Tirthankara of Jainism. It was built by a merchant and is decorated with figures from the Jain pantheon. It is a seven-storied pillar which was built by Biherwal Mahajan Sanaya of the Digambar Jain sect. On its four corners are engraved idols of Shri Adinathji in Digambar style, which are each five feet (about 1.5 meters) high, and elsewhere are engraved several small idols consecrated to the Jain lineage of deities.

==== Vijay Stambha ====
Vijay Stambha is a huge nine-storey tower which was built by Maharana Kumbha to commemorate his victory over the rulers of Malwa and Gujarat in 1440. The tower is 122 ft (37 m) high and stands on a 10 ft (3.0 m) high base. There are sculptures and carvings on the exterior walls of the tower. The tower is visible from any section of the town below. To reach the top of the tower, one has to climb 157 steps; it offers a great view of the surroundings from the top. The inside walls of the tower are carved with images of gods, weapons, etc.

=== Rana Kumbha's Palace ===
Rana Kumbha's Palace is near the Vijay Stambh. This is the birthplace of Maharana Udai Singh, the founder of Udaipur. His life was saved by the heroic act of the maid Panna Dhay, who replaced her son in place of the prince, with the result that her son was killed by Banbir. She carried the prince away to safety in a fruit basket. Rani Meera Bai also lived in this palace. This is the place where Rani Padmini committed jauhar with the other ladies in one of the underground cellars.

=== Rani Padmini's Palace ===
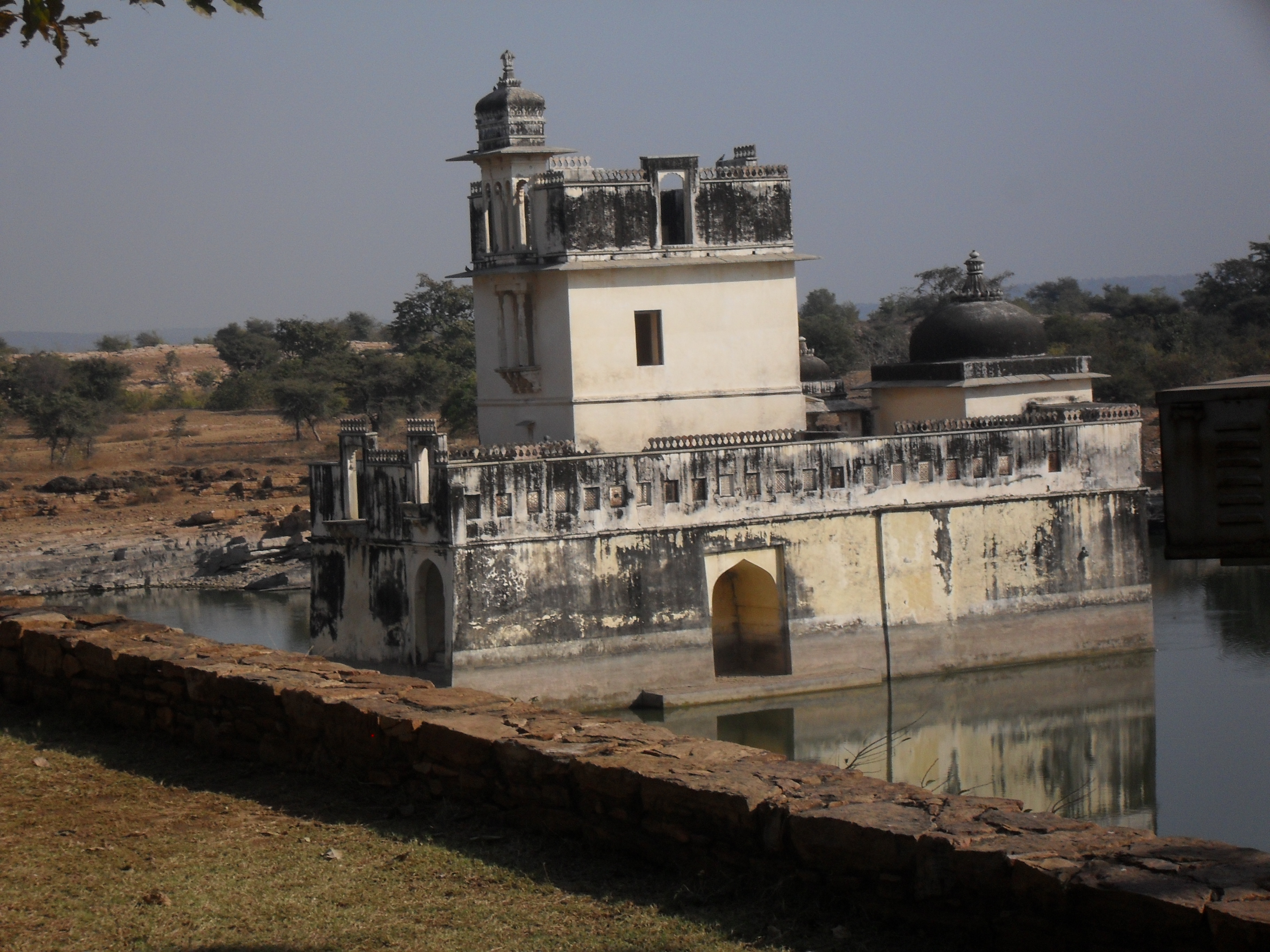
Rani Padmini's palace

According to legend, Rani Padmini's Palace is from which the Delhi Sultanate ruler Alauddin Khalji was allowed to watch a reflection of the Rani by replacing the mirror at such an angle that even if he turned back, he could not see the room. Khalji had been warned by the Rani's husband Rawal Ratan Singh that if he turned back, they would cut his neck.

=== Kalika Mata Temple ===
Kalika Mata Temple was originally built in the 8th century for Surya, the Sun God, and was later converted to a temple for the mother Goddess, Kali, in the 14th century. During the festival days of Navaratri, fairs are organised, and pilgrims from different places come here to pay obeisance at the temple.

== Education Institutions ==
- Mewar University, established in 2009

== Transport ==
The completed Golden Quadrilateral highway system passes through Chittorgarh, connecting it to most of India. The East-West Corridor (Express Highway) also crosses it. Chittorgarh is situated on National Highway No. 27 & 79. National Highway 27 connects to Kota and Udaipur with a 2-hour drive, and National Highway 48 connects to Bhilwara and Ajmer.

Chittorgarh is also connected to Indore via a 4-lane highway, a 5-hour drive, making it easy to access India's mini Bombay and business hub, Indore, via NH56 and then SH156. This highway makes connections with Neemuch, Mandsaur, and Ratlam, also. Chittorgarh is also home to Southeast Asia's largest highway exchange (Diamond crossing or Reethola Chauraha).

Chittaurgarh Junction is a busy & important junction of Western Railway of Indian Railways, Ratlam Division. It has direct rail links with all major Indian cities including Ajmer, Udaipur, Jaipur, Jodhpur, Agra, Delhi, Haridwar, Mumbai, Hyderabad, Kolkata, Pune, Chennai, Rameswaram, Yeshwantpur, Ahmedabad, Surat, Vadodara, Indore, Ratlam, Gwalior, Bhopal, Mandsaur, Jhansi, Khajuraho, Rewa, Nagpur, Bilaspur, Kota, and Mysore.

A daily train to Indore (Veerbhumi Express) and new connections to Ahmedabad are some of the important rail routes of the country. The city also enjoys the services of the Vande Bharat Express. The second suburban station of Chittorgarh is at Chanderiya (a locality of the city). To decongest heavy traffic on the Chittaurgarh junction, many trains are also directed from Chanderiya station.

Chittorgarh is well-connected to all parts of India by roads. The Golden Quadrilateral Road Project and north–south-East–west corridor expressways pass through Chittorgarh City. The bus stand (bus depot) of Chittorgarh is located between the old and new cities. There are good bus services (private as well as state-owned) available for Delhi, Mumbai, Ahmedabad, Ajmer, Bundi, Kota, Udaipur, and other major cities.

Rajasthan Roadways (RSRTC) provides a service for visiting areas around Chittorgarh. Rajasthan Roadways also has premier services called Pink Line, Silver Line, and Sleeper Coaches (Grey Line).

The nearest airport is Udaipur's Dabok Airport. The airport is located 70 kilometres from Chittorgarh and is linked by daily air service from New Delhi, Jaipur, Jodhpur, Ahmedabad, Chennai and Mumbai.

Chittorgarh also has a small airport at Ondawa. The Ondawa air strip serves some defence and chartered flights.

The city has a helipad at the reserve police lines.

== See also ==
- Nagari, Rajasthan
