= Pratap Gaurav Kendra =

Tourist spot in Udaipur based on Maharana Pratap

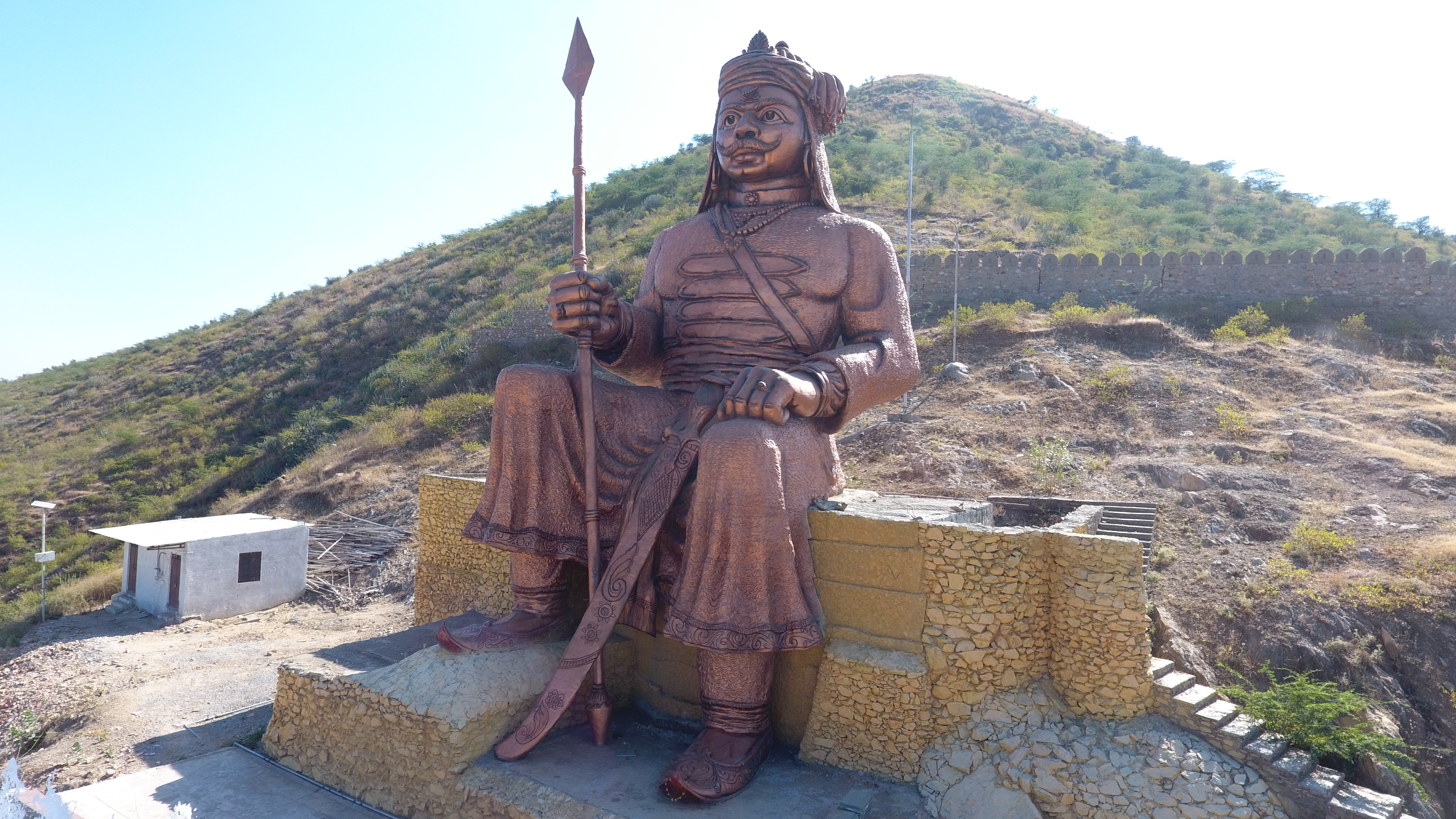
Statue of Maharana Pratap

Pratap Gaurav Kendra Rashtriya Tirtha is a historical memorial and tourist spot at Tiger Hills in Udaipur, Rajasthan, India. The project, which was started by the Veer Shiromani Maharana Pratap Samiti, aims at providing information about Maharana Pratap and the historical heritage of the area with the help of modern technology.

== Background ==
Pratap Gaurav Kendra Rashtriya Tirth aims to provide detailed information about the history and achievements of the former king of Mewar, Maharana Pratap. The project was initiated by a veteran pracharak (senior organizer) of the Rashtriya Swayamsevak Sangh (RSS). To materialise his vision, Veer Shiromani Maharana Pratap Samiti was formed in 2002 and a piece of 25 bigha land was purchased in 2007. The expected budget of this project was 100 crore rupees. The money for the project was also contributed by sangh swayamsewaks.

The RSS General secretary Mohan Bhagwat laid the foundation stone of the attraction in 2008, and inaugurated it in November 2016.

=== Location ===
Pratap Gaurav Kendra is located in Tiger Hills in the Bargaon area, near Manoharpura, around 9 km from Udaipur City Railway Station.

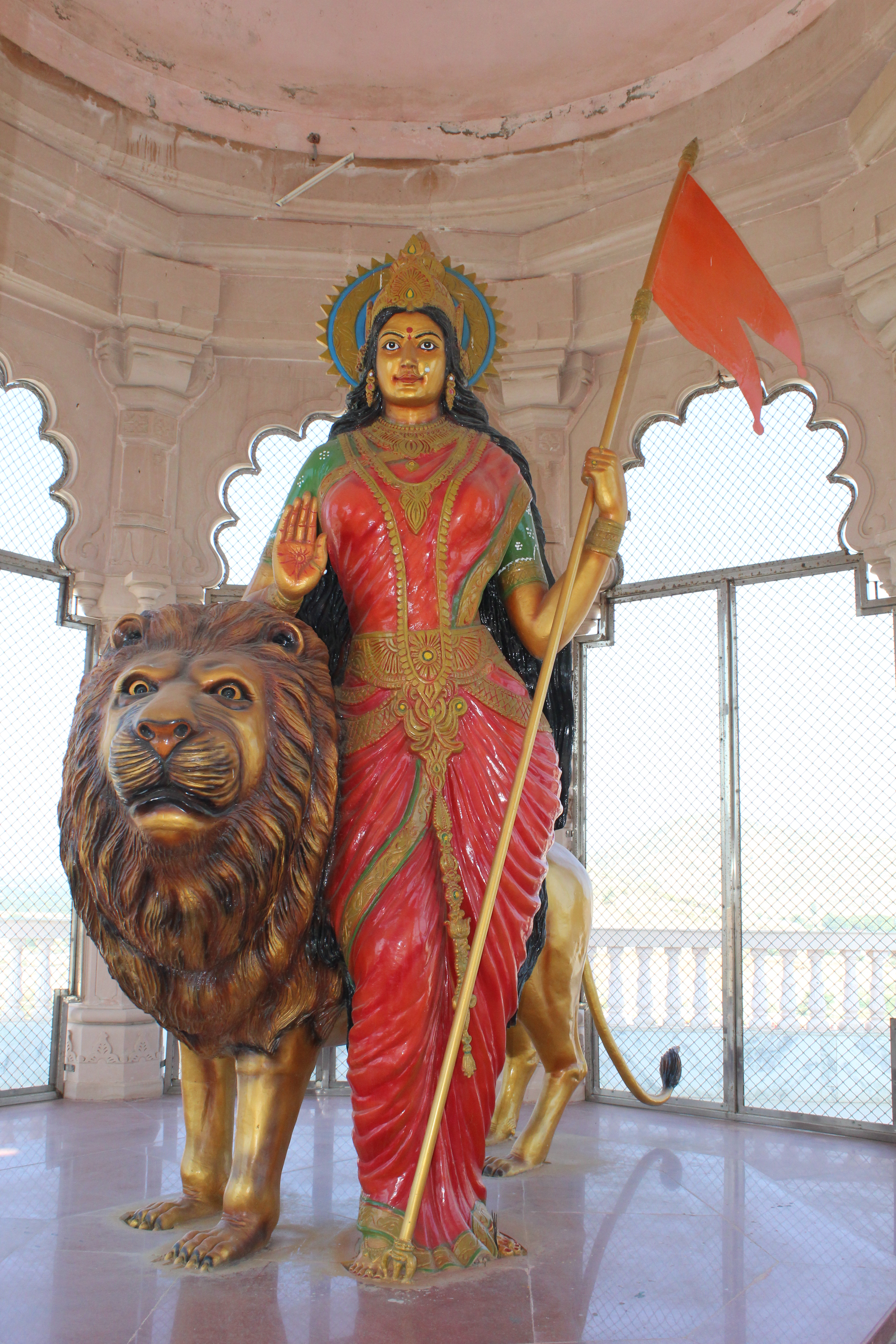
Bharat Mata statue

== Attractions ==
There are a number of attractions at Pratap Gaurav Kendra, the main one being the 57 feet high metal statue of Maharana Pratap in a sitting posture. There is also a 12-feet metal statue of Bharat Mata.

The project provides information on the past of Mewar and India, showing how it was plundered by invaders and how its boundaries were reduced. One of the attractions is a presentation of the history of Mewar with moving figures, embellished by sound and light.

There is also information on the history of historical figures such as Bappa Rawal, Hadi Rani, Panna Dai, and Rana Sangha. Three series of three movies have been produced to show the history of the area and some of the historical figures. In addition, there are galleries with statues and pictures. The Bhakti Dham, is a temple complex located within the premises that includes nine smaller shrines representing deities from nine prominent temples of the Mewar region.

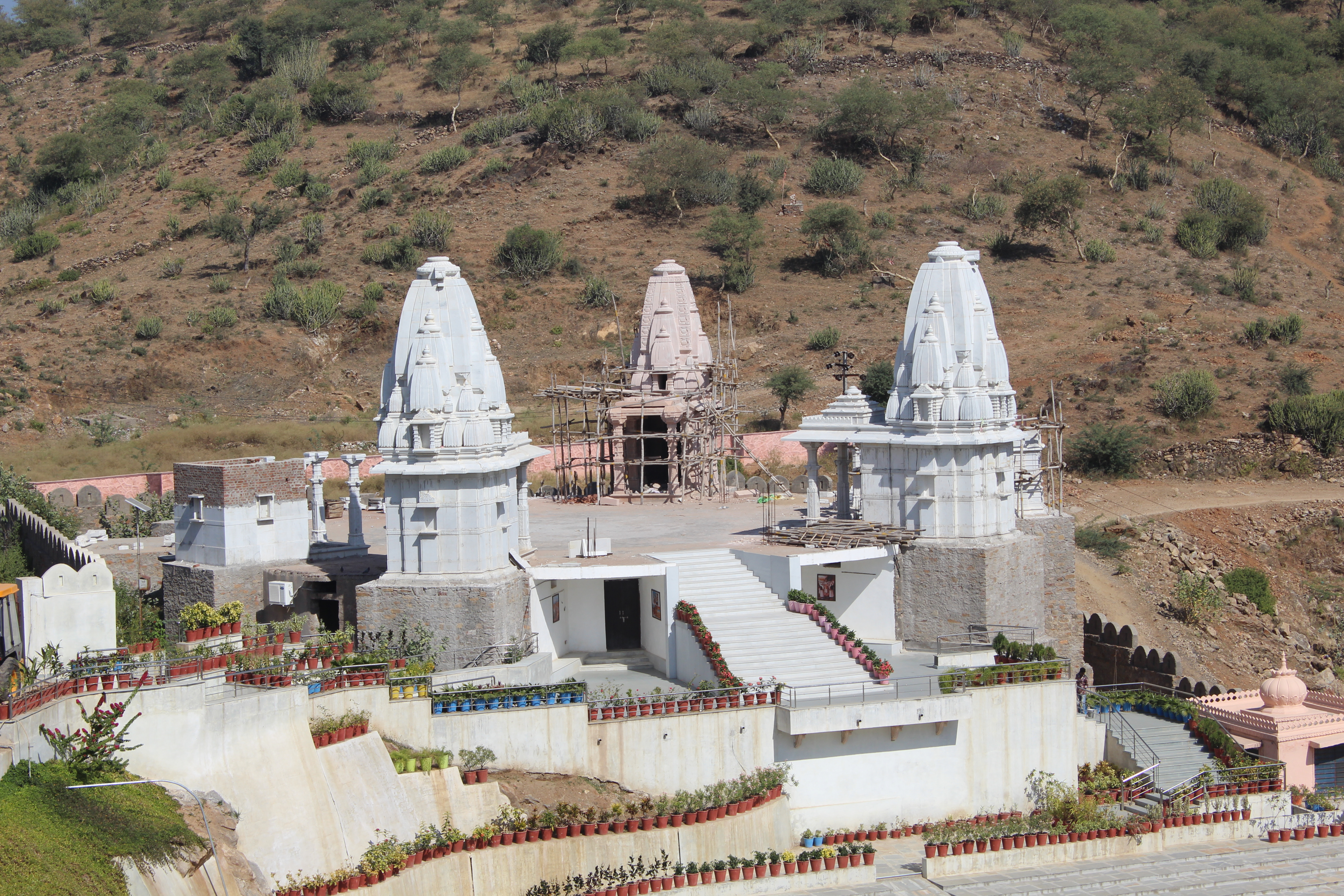
Bhakti Dham

== See also ==
- Moti Magri
