= Udai Singh II =

Founder of Udaipur and Maharana of Mewar from 1540 to 1572

- Maharana
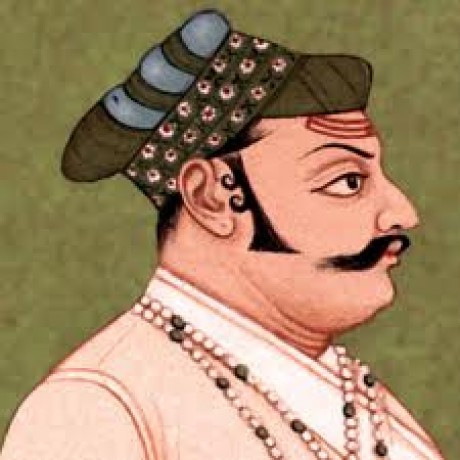
- Rana Udai Singh II

Rana of Mewar
- Reign: 1540 – 28 February 1572
- Coronation: 1540, Kumbalgarh
- Predecessor: Vanvir Singh
- Successor: Pratap Singh I
- Born: 4 August 1522; Chittor Fort, Kingdom of Mewar (present-day Chittor Fort, Chittorgarh District, Rajasthan, India)
- Died: 28 February 1572 (aged 49); Gogunda, Kingdom of Mewar (present-day Gogunda, Udaipur District, Rajasthan, India)
- Consort: Jaiwanta Bai
- Spouse: 18 queens including: Maharani Jaiwanta Bai Songara of Jalore; Rani Sajja Bai Solankini of Toda; Rani Dheer Bai Bhattiyani of Jaisalmer; Rani Jaivanta Bai Madrechi (Rani Lalabai) Rani Laccha Bai Balechi (Chauhan); Rani Veer Bai Jhala of Jhalawad; Rani Lakha Bai Jhala; Rani Karamti Bai of Marwar
- Issue: 24 sons including: Pratap Singh I Shakti Singh; Vikram Singh; Jagmal Singh Sisodia Likhmi (wife of Rao Maldeo); Chanda Bai (wife of Chandrasen Rathore)
- Dynasty: Sisodia
- Father: Rana Sanga
- Mother: Maharani Karmavati Hada (Chauhan) daughter of Rao Nirbudh of Bundi.
- Religion: Hinduism

Udai Singh II (Mewari pronunciation: [ʊ.d̪əj sɪŋʱ]; 4 August 1522 – 28 February 1572) was the 12th Maharana of the Kingdom of Mewar from 1540 until his death in 1572. He was also the founder of the city of Udaipur in the present-day state of Rajasthan, India. He was the fourth son of Rana Sanga and Rani Karnavati, a princess of Bundi.

== Early life ==
Udai Singh was born in Chittor in August 1522. After the death of his father, Rana Sanga, Ratan Singh II was crowned King. Ratan Singh II was assassinated in 1531. He was succeeded by his brother Maharana Vikramaditya Singh. During the reign of Vikramaditya, when the Muzaffarid Sultan of Gujarat Bahadur Shah sacked Chittor in 1535, Udai Singh was sent to Bundi for safety. In 1537, Banvir killed Vikramaditya and usurped the throne. He tried to kill Udai Singh as well, but Udai's nurse Panna Dai sacrificed her own son Chandan to save him from his cousin Banvir and took him to Kumbhalgarh. He lived secretly in Kumbhalgarh for two years, disguised as a nephew of the governor Asha Shah Depura (Maheshwari Majahan).

== Personal life ==
Udai Singh had 24 sons. His first wife, Maharani Jaivanta Bai Songara, a Chauhan princess of Jalore, gave birth to his eldest son, Maharana Pratap. His second wife, Sajja Bai Solankini, a daughter of Rao Prithvi Singh Solanki of Toda, gave birth to his sons Shakti Singh and Vikram Dev Singh. Dheer Bai Bhattiyani, a princess of Jaisalmer, daughter of Rawal Lunkaran Bhatti and sister of Umade Bhattiyani, was his favourite wife and was the mother of his sons, Jagmal Singh, Kunwar Agar Singh and Kunwar Pachyad Singh. Dheerbai also bore him two daughters. Rani Veer Bai Jhala was the mother of Kunwar Sagar Singh and Kunwar Rai Singh.

== Reign ==
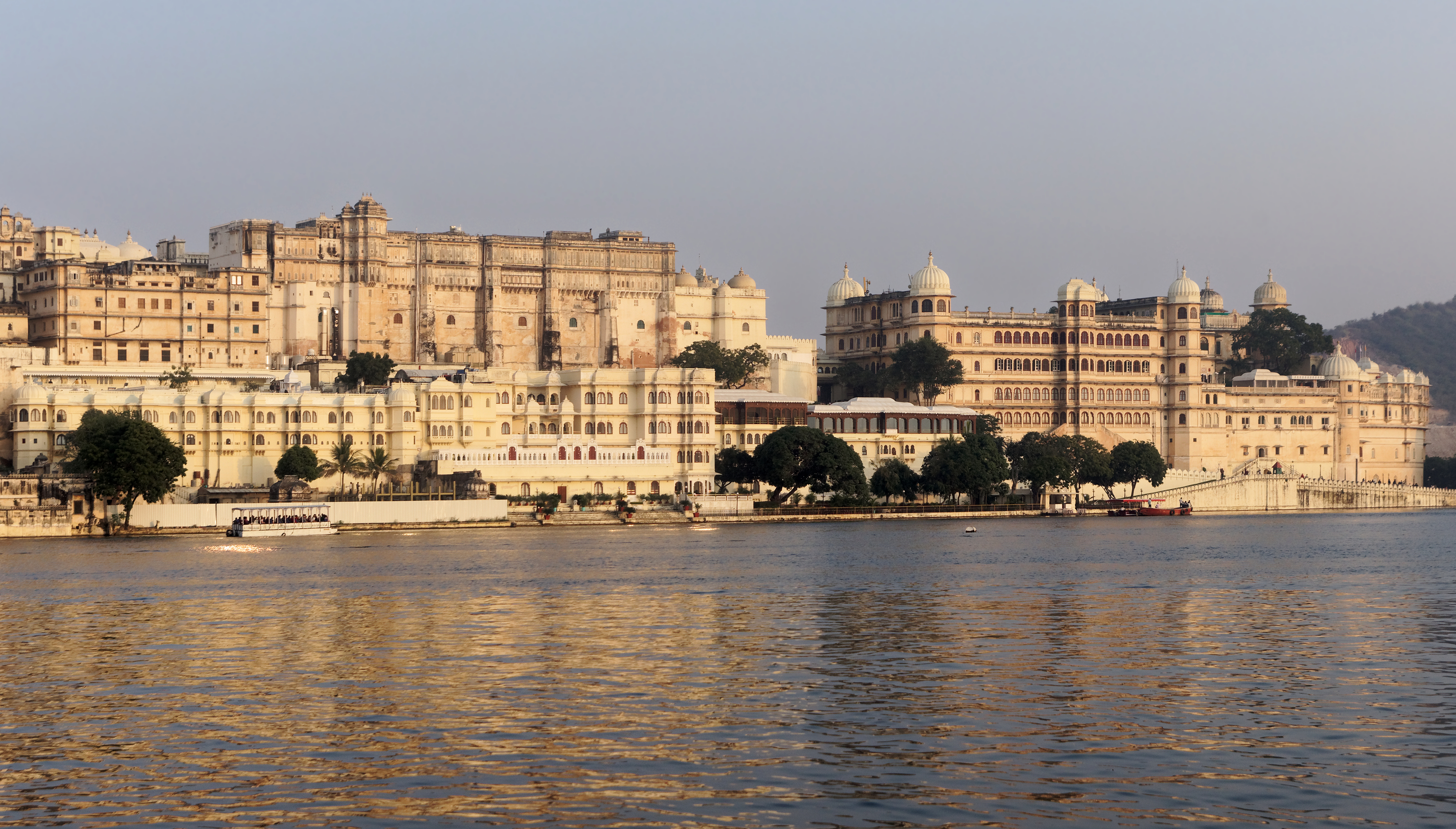
The City Palace, Udaipur built by Udai Singh II

In 1540, he was crowned in Kumbhalgarh by the nobles of Mewar. His eldest son Maharana Pratap from his first wife, Maharani Jaivantabai Songara (daughter of Akheiraj Songara of Jalore), was born in the same year.

In 1544 Sher Shah Suri invaded Marwar after defeating Maldev at Sammel. Udai Singh had just dealt with the civil war in Mewar and did not have the resources to fight the Sur Empire, he thus surrendered Chittor to Sher Shah Suri on the terms that Sher Shah does not harm the people of Mewar. Sher Shah also accepted the terms as he knew that the siege would be long and costly.

Udai Singh and his council felt that Chittor was too vulnerable and thus planned to shift Mewar's capital to a safer location. In 1559 work started in the Girwa portion of Mewar and in the same year a man-made lake was made to promote cultivation. The lake was completed in 1562 and the new capital soon came to be known as Udaipur.

In 1557, Udai was defeated by Maldev Rathore at the Battle of Harmada and lost Merta to him.

In 1562, Udai gave refuge to Baz Bahadur, the last ruler of the Malwa Sultanate, whose kingdom had been annexed by Akbar into the Mughal Empire.

In September 1567, his son Shakti Singh came to him from Dhaulpur and told him of Akbar's plan to capture Chittor. According to Kaviraj Shyamaldas, Udai Singh called a council of war. The nobles advised him to take refuge along with the princes in the hills, leaving a garrison at Chittor. On 23 October 1567 Akbar formed his camp near Chittor. Udai Singh retired to Gogunda (which later became his temporary capital) leaving Chittor in the hands of his loyal chieftains Rao Jaimal and Patta. Akbar captured Chittor after a four-month-long siege on 23 February 1568; the siege culminated in a brutal sacking of the city, leaving Chittor's garrison and 25-40,000 civilians dead. With Chittor lost to the Mughals, Udai would later shift his capital to Udaipur.

He died in 1572 in Gogunda. After his death, Jagmal tried to seize the throne but the nobles of Mewar prevented Jagmal from succeeding and placed Maharana Pratap Singh on the throne on 1 March 1572.

== In popular culture ==
- In the 2008 romance drama film Jodhaa Akbar, a partly fictionalised version of Udai Singh II is portrayed by actor Surendra Pal.
- In the 2013 television serial, Bharat Ka Veer Putra – Maharana Pratap, Udai Singh II was portrayed by Shakti Anand.

Udai Singh II Sisodia Rajput Clan Born: 4 August 1522 Died: 28 February 1572
| Preceded by Vikramaditya Singh | Sisodia Rajput Ruler; 1540–1572 | Succeeded by Pratap Singh I |
