= Banvir =

Maharana of Mewar from 1536 to 1540

- Rana

Rana of Mewar
- Reign: 1536–1540
- Predecessor: Vikramaditya Singh
- Successor: Udai Singh II
- Died: 1540
- Dynasty: Sisodias of Mewar
- Father: Prithviraj Sisodia

Banvir (died 1540), also known as Banbeer, was the ruler of Mewar between 1536 and 1540. He was a nephew of Rana Sanga, born to his elder brother Prithviraj and his concubine.

Banvir, succeeded to the throne of Mewar in the age of political instability in the kingdom which started in aftermath of Sanga's death in 1528. In 1536, aided by chiefs of Mewar, he assassinated Vikramaditya and became the next ruler of the dynasty. Despite his administrative reforms, he failed to get support of Mewar nobles due to his illegitimate birth. He was defeated and killed in Battle of Mavli in 1540 against Udai Singh II who succeeded him as the next ruler of Mewar kingdom.

== Birth ==
Banvir was born to the Sisodia prince Prithviraj and his non Rajput concubine in early 16th century. He was nephew of Rana Sanga (r.1509-1528), former Sisodia king and thus, laid his own claim to the throne after murder of Sanga and succession of weak rulers.

== Reign ==
After a string of weak rulers on the throne of Mewar after the death of Rana Sanga and following Sack of Chittor by Bahadur Shah in 1535, the status of Mewar as leading state of Rajasthan took another setback.

Vikramaditya, who was ruling Mewar at the time, was unpopular among his subjects for his incompetency as a ruler and eventually his own chiefs provoked Banvir to displace him and assume the reign of Mewar. Vikramaditya was soon assassinated by Banvir aided by his rebellious chiefs in 1536 and he succeeded as next ruler of Mewar.

During his rule, Banvir introduced a number of administrative changes which included respite in taxes on public. He also issued land grants to the leading Brahmins of the state along with cancellation of custom taxes on the Charans and Brahmins. In 1537, he order construction of a step-well in memories of his uncle, Rana Sanga.

== Relations with Udai Singh ==
After assassinating Vikramaditya, Banvir further planned to kill Prince Udai Singh (last surviving son of Sanga), to secure his position on the throne. However, Udai Singh was saved from the assault by nursemaid of the Sisodias, Panna Dai, who instead sacrificed her own son and escorted the prince to safety in Kumbhalgarh.

In few years, Banvir learned that Udai Singh survived the attack and garnered support from a faction of Mewar nobles as new Rana, he made an unsuccessful move to crush his rebellion. Udai Singh meanwhile, supported by the loyals of Mewar defeated Banvir in a fierce battle fought near Mauvli, where he died on the battleground. Thus, Udai Singh II succeeded to the throne of Mewar in 1540 amidst the instability in the kingdom.
