= Siege of Chittorgarh =

Siege of Chittorgarh may refer to these sieges of the Chittor Fort (Chittorgarh) in India:

- Siege of Chittorgarh (1303), in which the Delhi Sultanate ruler Alauddin Khalji defeated the Guhila king Ratnasimha.
- Siege of Chittorgarh (1535), in which Bahadur Shah of Gujarat defeated the Mewar regent Rani Karnavati after which she committed Jauhar.
- Siege of Chittorgarh (1567–1568), in which the Mughal emperor Akbar defeated Rao Jaimal of Merta.
