= Mandrayal =

- Town
- Location in Rajasthan, India Mandrayal (India)
- Coordinates: 26.3°N 77.23°E
- Country: India
- State: Rajasthan
- District: Karauli
- Elevation: 262 m (860 ft)

Population (2001)
  - Total: 23,118

Languages
  - Official: Hindi
- Time zone: UTC+5:30 (IST)
- PIN: 322251
- Telephone code: 07464-226...
- ISO 3166 code: RJ-IN
- Vehicle registration: RJ-

Mandrayal is a town in the state of Rajasthan, India. According to a census from 2011, Mandrayal has a population of 8,590; while the population of Mandrayal Tehsil is 74,600.

== History ==
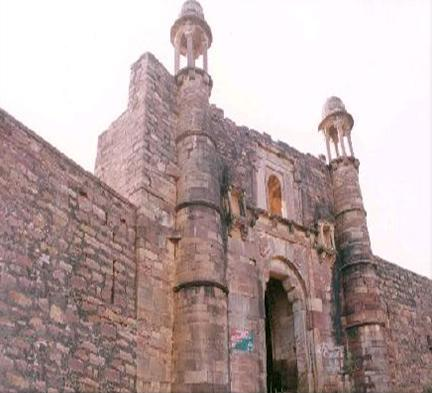
Mandrayal

Mandrayal is the main town in the Karauli district. It joins the two states of Madhya Pradesh and Rajasthan and is famous for its history. In 1534, Puranmal, the Raja of Amber, fought in favour of Mughals in the Battle of Mandrayal. The following year, Bahadur Shah of Gujrat besieged the fortress of Chittor. He dispatched Tatar Khan Lodi to capture Bayann. Humayun dispatched forces under Hindal Mirza and defeated the invaders in the Battle of Mandrayal in November 1534. Bharmal's policy towards Mughals was merely an extension of his brother's policy.

== Population ==
As of the 2011 Census of India, Mandrayal was home to 1588 households. Its population was 8,590 of which 4,586 were male and 4,004 female. The number of children with age 0-6 was 1412 and the Average Sex Ratio was 873, which was lower than the Rajasthan state average of 928. The Child Sex Ratio was 940, higher than the Rajasthan average of 888.

Mandrayal village has a higher literacy rate compared to Rajasthan. In 2011, the literacy rate of Mandrayal village was 70.30% compared to 66.11% of Rajasthan. In Mandrayal Male literacy stands at 82.81% while the female literacy rate was 55.75%. It is administrated by a Sarpanch (Head of Village), who is an elected representative.

== Festivals ==
The main religious festivals are Deepawali, Holi, Gangaur, Teej, Gogaji, Makar Sankranti and Janmashtami, as the main religion is Hinduism. Rajasthan's annual winter desert festival is also celebrated.
