= Lamida mediobarbalis =

Scientific classification
- Kingdom: Animalia
- Phylum: Arthropoda
- Class: Insecta
- Order: Lepidoptera
- Family: Pyralidae
- Genus: Lamida
- Species: L. mediobarbalis

Binomial name
- Lamida mediobarbalis (Hampson, 1916)

Synonyms
- Macalla mediobarbalis Hampson, 1916

Species of moth

Lamida mediobarbalis is a species of snout moth in the genus Lamida. It is known from India.
