= Panna Dhai =

Nursemaid of Sisodias

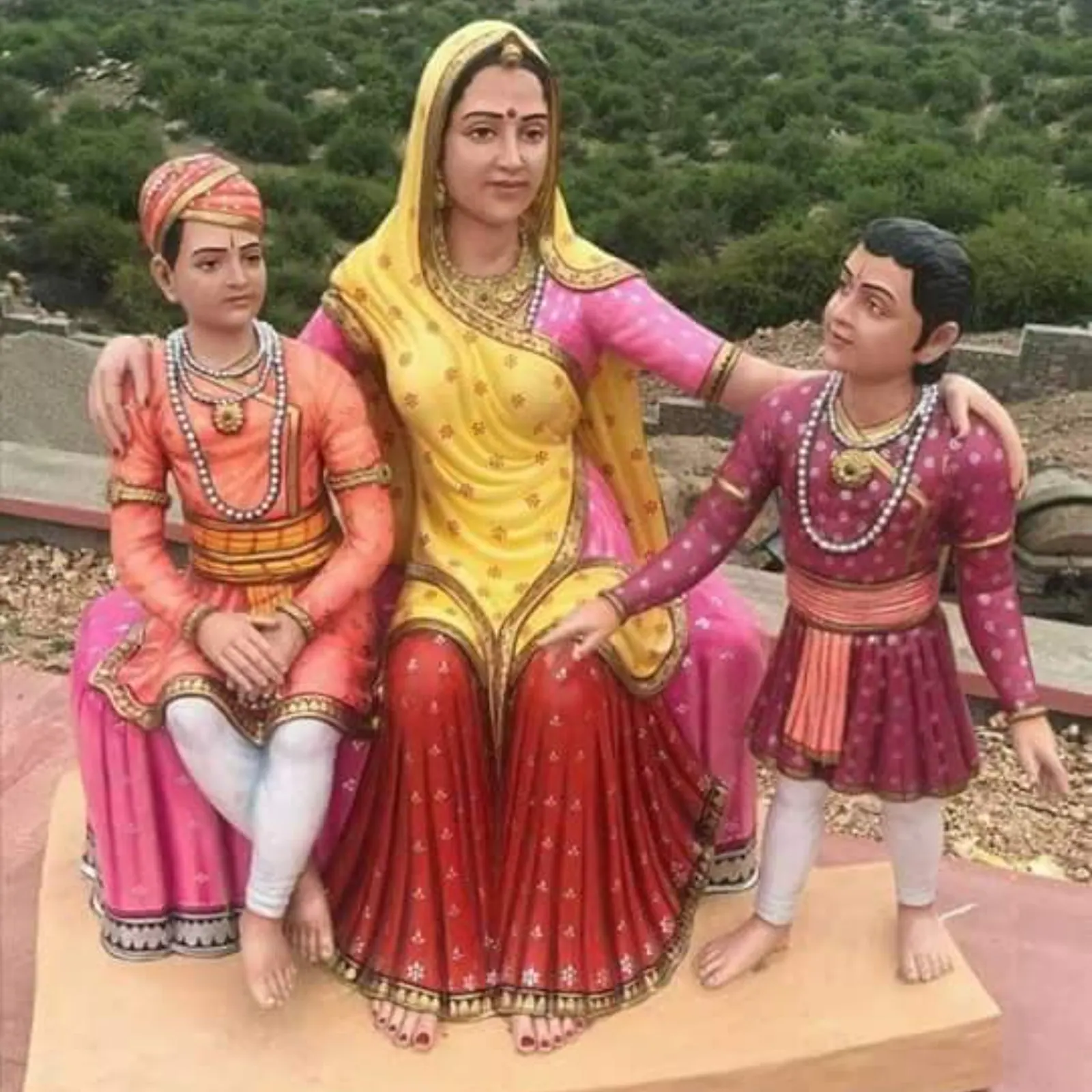
- Pronunciation: Pa-nnaa Daayee
- Era: Medieval India
- Known for: Sacrifice of her own son to save king's son from enemies.
- Children: Chandan

Panna Dhai also known as Panna Dai was a 16th-century nursemaid to Udai Singh II, the fourth son of Rana Sanga.

In Hindi, Panna means "emerald," and dhai means "nurse" "someone who breastfeeds someone else's child". Udai Singh was left in care of Panna, after Rani Karnavati committed Jauhar in 1535. When Udai was attacked by his uncle Banvir, Panna Dai sacrificed her own son Chandan's life to save him.

== Biography ==
Panna Dai was the nurse of Rani Karnavati, who was the wife of Rana Sanga. In 1531, Vikramaditya, the second son of Rana Sanga, succeeded the throne after his brother Rana Ratan Singh II. He was known for being insolent and arrogant. In 1535, Chittor was attacked by Bahadur Shah, causing Karnavati to call nobles and ordinary soldiers to defend Chittor. Those who were forced to leave Mewar or were disgruntled, joined. Unfortunately, the battle was lost, leaving Chittor sacked. However, Rajputs occupied the fort as soon as Bahadur Shah left. With the fort back in Rajput control, Vikramaditya came back from Bundi to rule again.

After the defeat, Vikramaditya's temperament didn't improve, causing him to physically abuse a respected chieftain at the court. In this situation, Banvir (Rana Sanga's nephew), who was the son of a non Rajput concubine of Prithviraj, joined the court. Banvir was ambitious and in 1536, he assassinated Vikramaditya. To remove all obstacles of his claim to the throne, Banvir attempted to assassinate Udai Singh as he was sleeping, however, Panna was alerted of the situation, and she was assisted by a man named Keerat who moved out Udai Singh from the kingdom, carrying him in a basket, while Panna placed her own son, Chandan, in Udai's place. Banvir came soon after, asking for Udai. Panna tried making excuses but she failed in that. The bed was then occupied by her son. She watched as he was murdered by that cruel person. Banvir arranged a meeting of the court and informed the chiefs that both the heirs were deceased. He then claimed his right to the throne and appointed himself king of Mewar. Panna and Udai fled to Kumbhalgarh, where the governor was a Maheshwari Mahajan, Asa Depura, who agreed to grant Udai protection. Udai Singh was nearly 15 years of age then.

When the rumours of Udai Singh being alive reached Banvir, he called him imposter, but since Udai Singh was around 15 years of age and his maternal relatives from Bundi could recognize him, Udai Singh started getting more and more support. In 1540, Udai and a considerable force from Mewar, marched into Chittor to reclaim his throne. Banvir sent out an army to repel the attack, but he was defeated. Udai Singh was crowned the 12th Rana of the Sisodia Dynasty. His eldest son and successor Maharana Pratap was born in the same year.

== Legacy ==
Harshadrai Sakerlal Mehta made, Veerangana Panna, an Indian silent about the nursemaid in 1934.

In 2014, the then Chief Minister of Rajasthan, Vasundhara Raje, inaugurated the Shaheed Smarak and Panna Dhai Museum, as well as a boat shaped museum at the Goverdhan Sagar Lake. The museum is dedicated to Panna Dai and her sacrifice to Mewar. The hall also portrays her life; in which visitors will be shown a 3D movie about her.

A national award, as well as a nursing college in Western Udaipur, has been named after her. Sachin Sen Gupta has also released a book detailing her life named 'Panna Dai'. There is also another college named after her, Panna Dhai Maa Subharti Nursing College, located in a lush green campus of Swami Vivekanand Subharti University, located at the outskirts of the town Meerut.

== See also ==
- Bappa Rawal
- Hadi Rani
- Rana Sanga
- Maharana Pratap
- Moti Magri
- Pratap Gaurav Kendra
- Udaipur
