= Lamida buruensis =

Scientific classification
- Domain: Eukaryota
- Kingdom: Animalia
- Phylum: Arthropoda
- Class: Insecta
- Order: Lepidoptera
- Family: Pyralidae
- Genus: Lamida
- Species: L. buruensis

Binomial name
- Lamida buruensis Janse, 1931

Species of moth

Lamida buruensis is a species of snout moth in the genus Lamida. It is known from Buru, Indonesia, from which its species epithet is derived.
