= Lamida moncusalis =

Scientific classification
- Kingdom: Animalia
- Phylum: Arthropoda
- Class: Insecta
- Order: Lepidoptera
- Family: Pyralidae
- Genus: Lamida
- Species: L. moncusalis

Binomial name
- Lamida moncusalis Walker, [1859]

Synonyms
- Macalla moncusalis; Allata penicillata Walker, 1863

Species of moth

Lamida moncusalis, the cashew shoot and blossom webber, is a species of snout moth in the genus Lamida. It was described by Francis Walker in 1859. It is found in India.

The larvae feed on cashew and mango.
