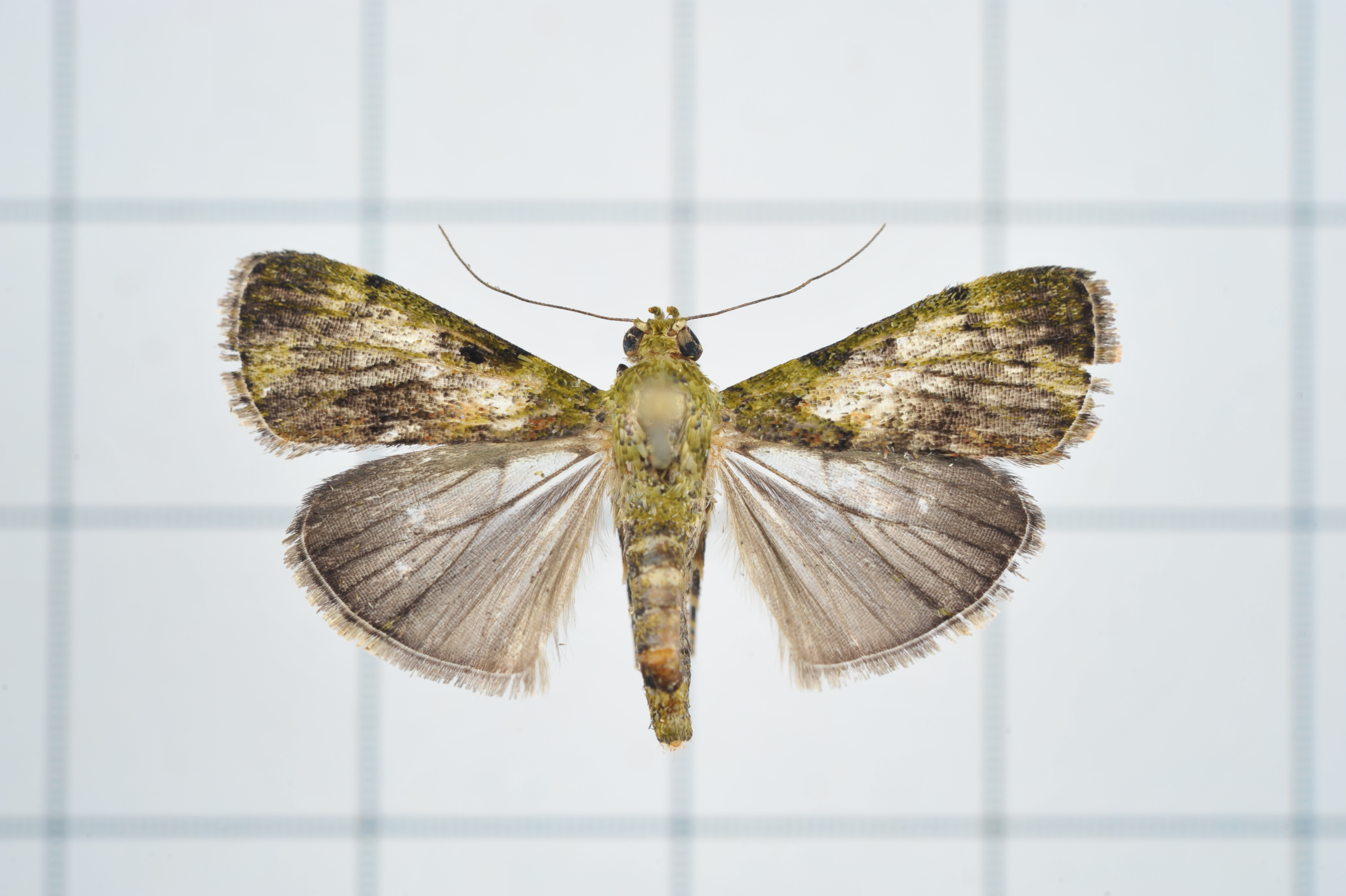

Scientific classification
- Domain: Eukaryota
- Kingdom: Animalia
- Phylum: Arthropoda
- Class: Insecta
- Order: Lepidoptera
- Family: Pyralidae
- Genus: Lamida
- Species: L. obscura

Binomial name
- Lamida obscura (Moore, 1888)

Synonyms
- Orthaga obscura Moore, 1888; Macalla proximalis Caradja, 1925; Macalla sordidalis Hampson, 1916

= Lamida obscura =

Species of moth

Lamida obscura is a species of snout moth in the genus Lamida. It was described by Frederic Moore in 1888, and is known from India (including Sikkim), China (including Canton), Taiwan and Japan.

The wingspan is 12–13 mm.
