= Ratan Singh II =

Rana of Mewar from 1528 to 1531

Maharana of Mewar
- Reign: 30 January 1528 – 1531
- Predecessor: Rana Sanga
- Successor: Vikramaditya Singh
- Died: 1531
- Spouse: Suja Bai of Bundi; Guman Kanwar of Jawas
Names
- Rana Ratan Singh Sisodia
- Dynasty: Sisodias of Mewar
- Father: Rana Sanga
- Mother: Rani Dhan Bai Rathore of Marwar

Ratan Singh II (died 1531) was the Maharana of Mewar from 1528 to 1531. He was a son of Rana Sanga. He was killed during a war in 1531. He was succeeded by his brother Vikramaditya Singh.

== Biography ==
Ratan Singh II was the son of Rana Sanga and Rani Dhan Bai. Thus he was a nephew of Rao Ganga and half-brother of Bhoj Raj, Vikramaditya, and Udai Singh. Upon the death of his elder brother Bhoj, Ratan became the heir apparent and post the death of his father, Maharana of Mewar.

His wives were Rani Guman Kanwar and Maharani Suja Bai of Bundi, the cousin of his stepmother Rani Karnavati.

Mahmud Khilji of Malwa was defeated by Ratan's father Sanga. He was waiting for an opportunity to enact revenge with a ruler of Mewar as a result. After the death of Sanga, he detached Shirza Khan with an army to lay waste the country of the Rana. According to Tarikh-i Alfi, he was actuated by these three motives (i) to chastise Rana (ii) to recover some territories of Malwa, which had been captured by Sanga and (iii) to punish Silahadi Tanwar, who was in concert with Rana and had recently seized some territory belonging to the kingdom of Malwa. But the attempts of the Sultan proved futile as Shirza Khan was badly defeated. At the same time, Ratan Singh II with a large army penetrated into Malwa and reached the village of Sambaliya (near Sarangpur). Having ravaged the country around it, he proceeded towards Ujjain to confront Sultan Mahmud Khilji II of Malwa. At the time when Maharana Sanga entered into Malwa, the Sultan of Gujrat, being in concert with the Sultan of Malwa, had extended the necessary help to the latter. But soon, the situation changed. Dissensions had broken out between these Sultans. Due to his arrogant temper, Sultan Mahmud Khilji of Malwa could not develop his faith among his adherents. He then summoned Mohin Khan of Sewas and Silahady to help him against the invasion of Mewar. When they waited on him, they were given some extraordinary honours. Both of them, suspecting foul play, deserted him and went to the camp of Ratan Singh which had disheartened the Sultan. The Mewar army succeeded in defeating the Malwa troops neat Ujjain and carried out depredations successfully.

Ratan notably had resentment for his brother in law Rao Suraj Mal of Bundi. This was due to the fact that he acted as guardian to his half-brother Vikramaditya and also because he abducted Ratan's fiancée, a daughter of Prithviraj Singh I. In order to enact revenge Ratan invited Suraj to hunt with him with the intent of killing him. During the hunting excursion Ratan attacked Suraj and they both ended up killing each other.

Preceded by Maharana Sangram Singh	Ruler of the Mewar Kingdom; 1528 - 1531	Succeeded by Vikramaditya Singh
