= Lamida =

Scientific classification
- Kingdom: Animalia
- Phylum: Arthropoda
- Class: Insecta
- Order: Lepidoptera
- Family: Pyralidae
- Subfamily: Epipaschiinae
- Genus: Lamida; Walker, 1859

Synonyms
- Allata Walker, 1863

Genus of moths

Lamida is a genus of snout moths. It was described by Francis Walker in 1859.

== Species ==
- Lamida buruensis
- Lamida mediobarbalis
- Lamida moncusalis Walker, [1859]
- Lamida obscura (Moore, 1888)
