= Bhoj Raj =

Heir apparent of Mewar and husband of poet Meerabai

- Born: c. 1495
- Died: 1526 (aged 30–31)
- Spouse: Mirabai
- Kunwar Bhojraj Singh Sisodia
- House: Sisodia
- Father: Rana Sanga
- Mother: Kanwar Bai Solankini
- Religion: Hinduism

Bhojraj Singh Sisodia (c. 1495–1526) was the eldest son of Rana Sanga, ruler of Mewar in western India. He is best known as the husband of the reputed bhakti poet-saint Meerabai.

== Biography ==
Bhojraj Singh was born the eldest of the seven sons of Maharana Sangram Singh I (Rana Sanga) of Mewar. He was thus the heir apparent to the throne of Mewar, but predeceased his father and died without male heirs. His father was head of the Sisodia clan of Rajputs. His mother, Kanwar Bai, was born into the Solanki clan of Rajputs and was the senior-most of Rana Sanga's wives.

As per contemporary tradition, Bhojraj and his bride would both have been in their teens when their marriage was celebrated in 1516. His bride, Meerabai, belonged to the noble family of Merta, a feudatory estate within the neighbouring kingdom of Marwar. She belonged to the Rathore clan of Rajputs.

The young Meerabai had already embarked upon the internal, spiritual journey that would pervade her life and raise her in future centuries to the status of near-divinity in India. Her disinterest in matters corporeal was of a piece with her rejection of the princely luxuries to which she was born. Bhojraj was nonplussed by her detachment and is said to have initially attempted to pull her back into worldly affairs. He is said to have found Meerabai's detachment and personality fascinating. By many accounts, Bhojraj and Meerabai enjoyed a relationship of friendship and understanding, with Bhojraj appreciating Meerabai's poetic talents and indulging her wish to have a temple build to God Krishna within the palace complex.

Bhojraj died in battle in 1526. His death had a profound effect on Meerabai's life, for she lost both a friend who had kept her interested, however tenuously, in worldly affairs; and a patron who had protected her from criticism and rebuke within the family while indulging her eccentricities.

Bhojraj left no children and was succeeded as heir apparent of Mewar by his younger brother, Ratan Singh II.

== In popular culture ==
He features primarily in many biopics of Meera Bai, including Meera (1945), a Tamil language film starring M. S. Subbulakshmi, and Meera (1979), a Hindi film by Gulzar with Hema Malini in lead role and Vinod Khanna playing the role of Bhoj Raj.

The relationship between Bhojraj, the worldly heir-apparent of a powerful kingdom, and Meerabai, a princess with a passion for God and a preference for detachment and austerity, has engaged the attention of several scholars. Kiran Nagarkar has written a semi-fictional book "Cuckold," dealing with the many nuances of this relationship. The book's title refers to Bhojraj himself, for he took second place to God Krishna in the affections of his wife. The book was widely acclaimed and received the Sahitya Akademi Award in 2001.

Other portrayals of Bhojraj are found in Indian films. In the Tamil film Meera, the role of Bhojraj is played by V. Nagayya. Bhojraj shown to be a sensitive and conscientious prince with a fondness for music and Meerabai's poetry. He is shown making many efforts to woo the woman he is married to, and largely succeeds in establishing a relationship of affection and mutual respect. His several private frustrations in this project are also depicted sensitively. Towards the end, Bhojraj's own sense of duty towards his kingdom and people, and the need to maintain the dignity of his royal house, added to disapproval from family and courtiers, compel him to send his wife into exile. Meerabai later dies after having a vision of the God Krishna, and in the final scene of the film, Bhojraj is shown becoming a devotee of his own wife. This version is at variance with most other versions of events, which state that Bhojraj died before Meerabai, and that her subsequent exile was ordered by Bhojraj's younger brother and successor.
