= Rani Karnavati =

Rani of Mewar from 1509 to 1528

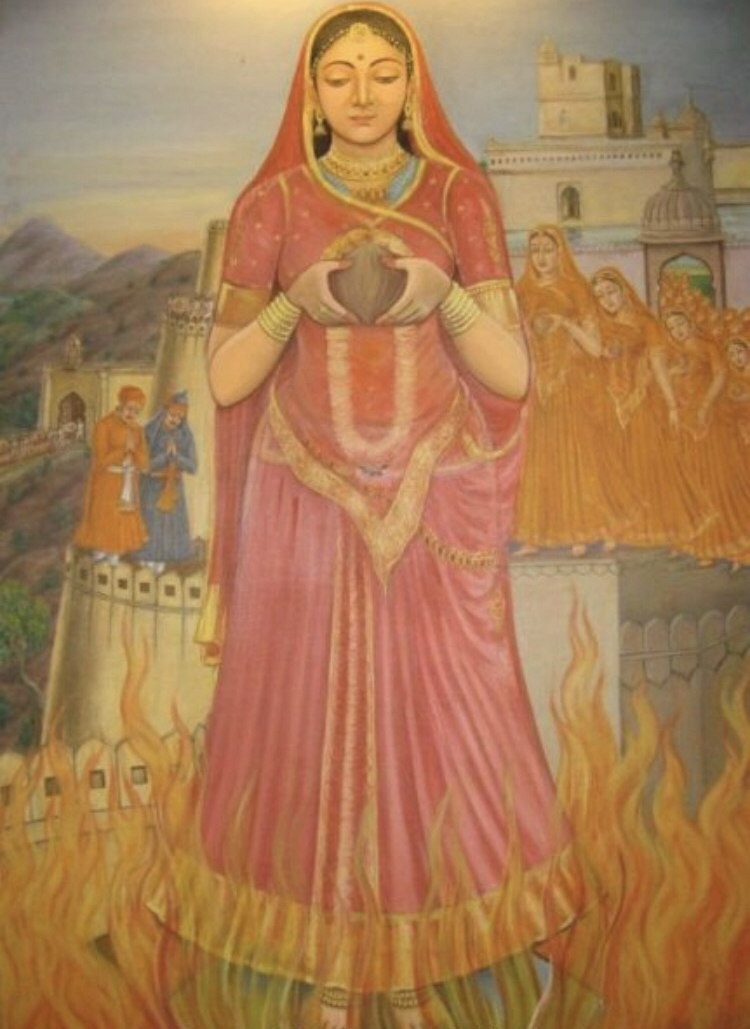

Maharani of Mewar
- Reign: 1509 – 1528
- Predecessor: Jhali Ratan Kanwar of Halvad
- Successor: Suja Bai of Bundi
- Died: 8 March 1535; Chittorgarh
- Spouse: Rana Sanga
- Issue: Vikramaditya; Udai Singh II
- Father: Rao Nirbudh of Bundi
- Mother: Rani Sa of Bundi

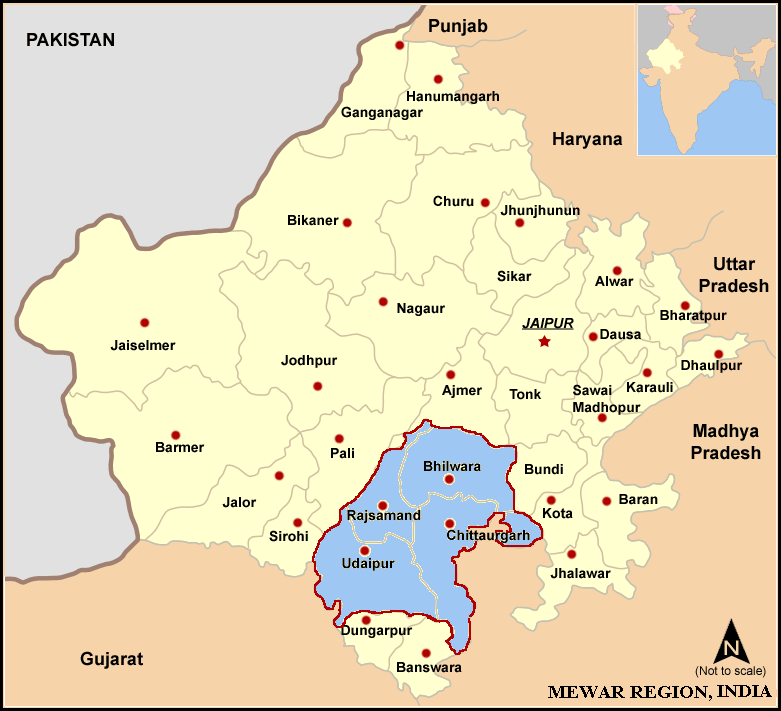
Mewar

Rani Karnavati, also known as Rani Karmavati (died 8 March 1535), was a princess from Bundi, India and regent of Mewar. She was married to Rana Sanga (c. 1508–1528) of Mewar. She was the mother of the next two Ranas, Rana Vikramaditya and Rana Udai Singh, and grandmother of Maharana Pratap. She served as regent during the minority of her son, from 1527 until 1533. She was as fierce as her husband and defended Chittor with a small contingent of soldiers until it inevitably fell to the Gujarat army which was led by Bahadur Shah of Gujarat. She refused to flee and performed jauhar to protect her honor.

== Biography ==
=== Early Life and Marriage ===
Rani Karnavati was born a Hada Chauhan princess. She was the daughter of Rao Nirbudh of Bundi, son of the 6th Rao of Bundi, Rao Banduji. Both she and her sister Rani Lakhu Devi were married to Rana Sanga. Karnavati was mother to Sanga's younger sons Vikramaditya and Udai.

=== As Queen Dowager ===
After Mughal Emperor Babur had captured the throne of Delhi in 1526 AD, Rana Sanga led a confederation of Rajput Kings against Babur to capture the throne of Delhi. Initially, the Rana succeeded in pushing the Mughal army back in the Battle of Bayana, but in the Battle of Khanva he was defeated due to Babur's superior tactics, cannons and artillery.

After Rana Sanga's death in 1528, Karnavati's stepson Ratan took the throne. During this time Karnavati took up residence at Ranthambore Fort with her sons. She chose her cousin Rao Suraj Mal of Bundi (who also happened to be Ratan's brother in law) to be her representative during this time. Ratan ordered that Karnavati return to Chittor and give up the treasures Rana Sanga had accumulated from the Kings of Malwa during his Siege of Mandsaur. Karnavati however was able to evade doing this. Instead during this time she allegedley engaged in talks with Babur to accquire the land of Bayana for the Kingodom of Mewar. This however did not materialize.

=== As Regent ===
In 1531 Ratan and Suraj Mal killed each other during a hunting excursion. This left the throne to Karnavati's son Vikramaditya. Karnavati took up the regency in the name of her elder son Vikramaditya, who was deemd a weak ruler. This was due to the fact that Mewar was attacked for the second time by Bahadur Shah of Gujarat, at whose hands Vikramaditya had earlier received a defeat. It was a matter of great concern for Rani.

The antagonized nobles were not ready to fight for Vikramaditya and the imminent battle was sure to be another blot in the history of Sisodias. Rani Karnavati wrote to the nobles to come forward for the sake of the honor of the Sisodias and was able to persuade the nobles to fight for Mewar, if not for Vikramaditya. Their sole condition was that Vikramaditya and Uday Singh should go to Bundi during the war for their personal safety. Some later unsophisticated legends say that the Rani also sent a Rakhi to the Mughal Emperor Humayun, calling him a brother and asking for help. Thus her name became irrevocably linked to the festival of Raksha Bandhan. However, this is not supported by any contemporary writer, and modern historians like Satish Chandra consider this to be a fable rather than a historical fact.

Karnavati agreed to send her sons to Bundi and told her trusted maid Panna Dai to accompany them and take good care of them. Panna was reluctant, but surrendered to the wishes of the queen. The Sisodias had fought valiantly, but they were outnumbered and the war was lost. Bahadur Shah entered Chittorgarh and ransacked it for the second time.

Realizing that defeat was imminent, Karnavati and the other noble ladies of the court immolated themselves in Jauhar on March 8, 1535 AD, while all the men donned saffron clothes and went out to fight to the death and thus committed Saka. This is the occasion for the second of the three Jauhars performed at Chittor.
