= Hadi Rani =

Legendary female figure in India

- Hadi Rani
- Born: Sahal Kanwar
- Spouse: Ratan Singh Chundawat
- Dynasty: Hada Chauhan (by birth); Chundawat Sisodia (by marriage)
- Father: Sangram Singh Hada
- Religion: Hinduism
- Known for: sacrificed herself to motivate her husband to go to a battle.

Hadi Rani Sahal Kanwar was a Queen from Rajasthan. She was a daughter of Hada Chauhan Rajput, the Sangram Singh married to Rawat Ratan Singh, a Chundawat chieftain of Salumbar in Mewar who sacrificed herself to motivate her husband to go to a battle.

According to the legend, when Raj Singh I (1653–1680) of Mewar called Ratan Singh to join the rebellion against Mughal governor of Ajmer Subah, the commander, having married only a few days earlier. He asked his wife, Hadi Rani, for some memento to take with him to the battlefield. Thinking that she was an obstacle to him doing his duty for Mewar, she cut off her head and put it on a plate. A servant covered it with a cloth and presented it to her husband. Devastated but nevertheless proud, the commander tied the memento around his neck by its hair and after their rebellion ended, he got to his knees and cut his neck, having lost the desire to live.

A Beautiful Poetry Book, defining that love, and sacrifice of Sahal : Hada Rani, is written by Dany Solanki, an epic love story.

"She had long, knee-length hair and always tied it in a single braided ponytail. After cutting off her head, the commander picked it up, lifted it by the long braided ponytail, and tied it around his neck as a necklace."

== Legacy ==
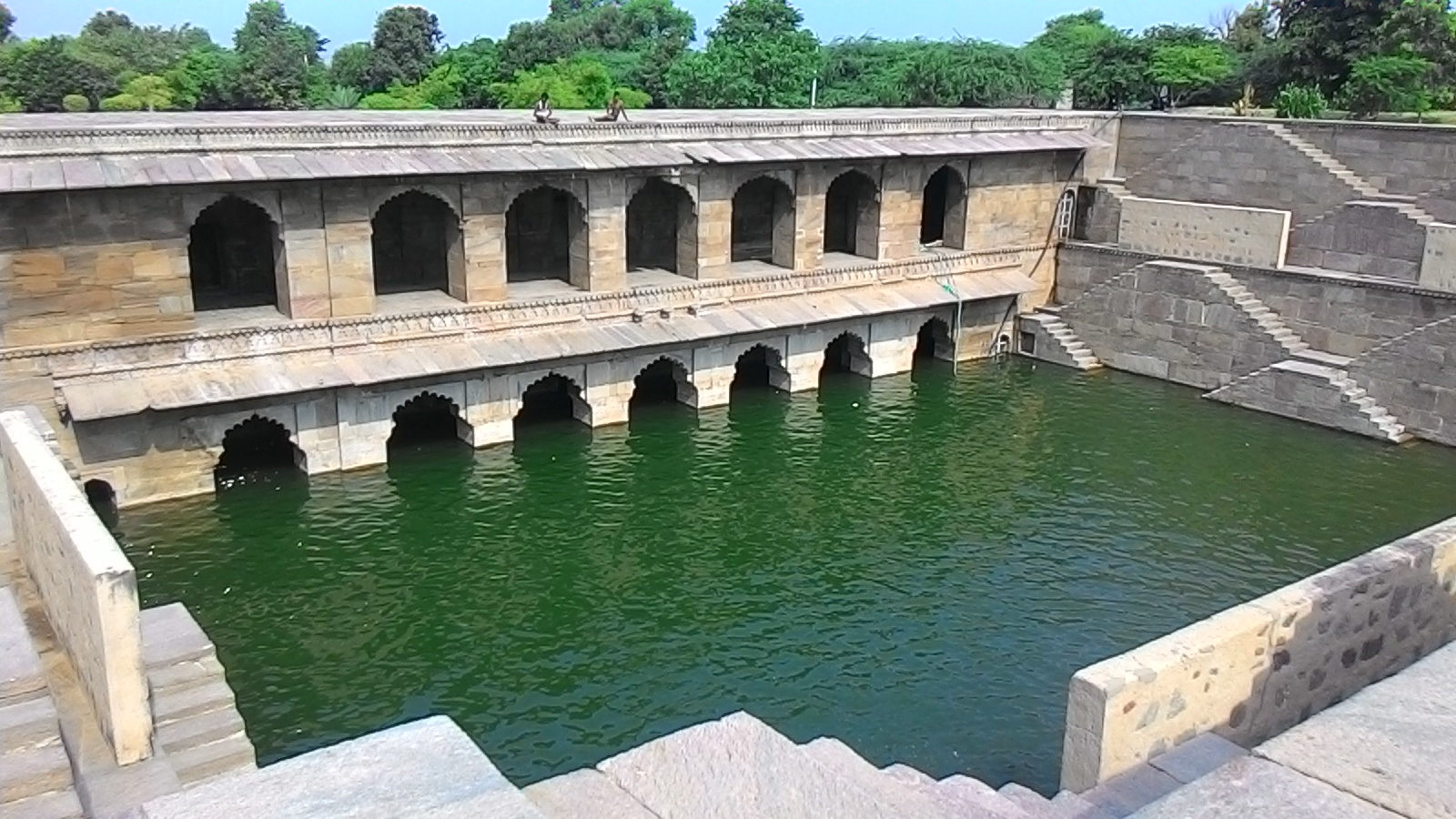
Hadi Rani Ki Baori

Still today, people worship her in Rajasthan and folklore singers tell her story in songs about her chivalry, valor, courage. She is also inspiration of various stories, poems and songs in Rajasthan and her story is part of curriculum in Rajasthan. Hadi Rani Ki Baori is a stepwell located in Todaraisingh town in Tonk district of Rajasthan state in India. It is believed that it was built in 17th century CE. Rajasthan Police has formed a women's battalion named 'Hadi Rani Mahila Battalion'
