= Prithviraj Sisodia =

16th-century Rajput prince of Mewar

Kunwar Prithviraj Sisodia
- Udno Prithviraj (Flying Prithviraj)
- Died: Kumbhalgarh
- Spouse: Tarabai Solanki, Pama De
- Issue: Banvir
- House: Sisodia
- Father: Rana Raimal
- Mother: Jhali Ratan Kanwar
- Religion: Hinduism

Prithviraj Sisodia, generally known as Kunwar Prithviraj (born late 15th century; died 16th century), was the eldest son of Maharana Raimal (died 1509) of Mewar and heir apparent of Mewar, of the Sisodia Rajputs. His mother was Jhali Rani Ratan Kanwar. His rapidity of moving from one place to another and lightning speed of attack earned him the title of Udno Rajkumar Prithviraj, the flying prince Prithviraj. He added the regions of Godwar and Ajmer to the territory of Mewar.

== Early life ==
Maharana Raimal had 14 sons, of whom Prithviraj was the eldest and heir apparent. Prithviraj's two real brothers were Jaimal and Sangram Singh, who later became the Maharana of Mewar, popularly known as Maharana Sanga (1482–1528). Their mother was Jhali Ratan Kanwar, daughter of Rajdhar Jhala. These three brothers played an important role in shaping Mewar's history.

== Conflict with Sanga ==
A Charan woman, who lived at Nahar Magra, had prophesied that Sanga would be the heir to the throne, not Prithviraj. Upon hearing this, Prithviraj attacked Sanga, but Surajmal (cousin of Prithviraj, grandson of Maharana Mokal) interposed himself and took the blow, but that blow still injured Sanga's eye. Sanga, unwilling to attack the heir apparent, left the fight while Surajmal engaged Prithviraj. Sanga succeeded in getting away with five cuts and the loss of an eye. Jagmal chased Sanga, but Sanga was saved by Rathore Bida, who died in the fight at Sewantri. Sanga then remained for a few months under Karamchand Panwar at Shrinagar, near Ajmer.

== Conquest of Godwar ==
After Prithviraj's conflict with Sanga, Maharana Raimal forbade Prithviraj his presence. Prithviraj made Kumbhalgarh fort his base and expanded his control over the plains of Godwar, suppressing the Meenas who ravaged the countryside. He also subdued the Balecha and Madrecha Chauhans of Godwar, except for their stronghold of Desuri.

He took the help of Raimal Solanki, who sent his sons Shankar Singh and Samant Singh to attack the Madrechas of Desuri. The Solankis defeated the Madrechas, and Sanda the leader of the Madrechas was killed in the battle. Prithviraj then granted Patta of Desuri with its 140 villages to the Solankis. The Solankis of Jhilwara and Roopnagar are descendants of Shankar Singh and Samant Singh respectively.

Prithviraj then established civil and military authority over the entire Godwar and he appointed administrators, Raimal Solanki for the military and an Ojha for civil administration. The Narlai inscription mentions that Prithviraj remained in charge of Godwar for a considerable time.

Ram Kanwar Bai, daughter of Rana Kumbha Kunwar and aunt of Prithviraj, was married to Mandalik, King of Girnar. When she was alienated from her husband, Prithviraj made a swift march and surprised Mandalik in his palace. He spared his life however and brought Rama Bai back to Mewar. Jawar was conferred upon Ram Kanwar. She built a temple of Rama Swami and a large stepwell here.

== Attack on Toda ==
Toda, which was earlier under the Solankis, was taken over by the Afghan Lalla Khan when Rao Surtan Solanki was living in Badnor, which was granted to the Solankis by Rana Raimal. Prithviraj vowed to "restore Toda to Solankis or he was no true Rajput".

Prithviraj, with his chosen 500 horsemen and Tarabai Solanki, daughter of Rao Surtan Solanki, attacked Toda. They reached it when the Tazia procession was ongoing. Prithviraj, with one of his trusted Sengar chiefs (being those who were the inseparable companion of Kunwar Prithviraj & Tarabai) and Tarabai left their cavalcade and joined the procession. As they reached under the balcony of the Afghan chief, the Afghan enquired about these strange horsemen who were part of the procession. Prithviraj threw his lance and Tarabai shot an arrow, which struck the Afghan lord, and he fell on the ground. Before the public recovered from the shock, the three of them dashed for the gate of the city, which was obstructed by an elephant. Tarabai sliced the elephant's trunk: with the elephant fleeing, the passage was clear to join their cavalcade. The Afghans could not withstand the attack and those who could not flee were killed.

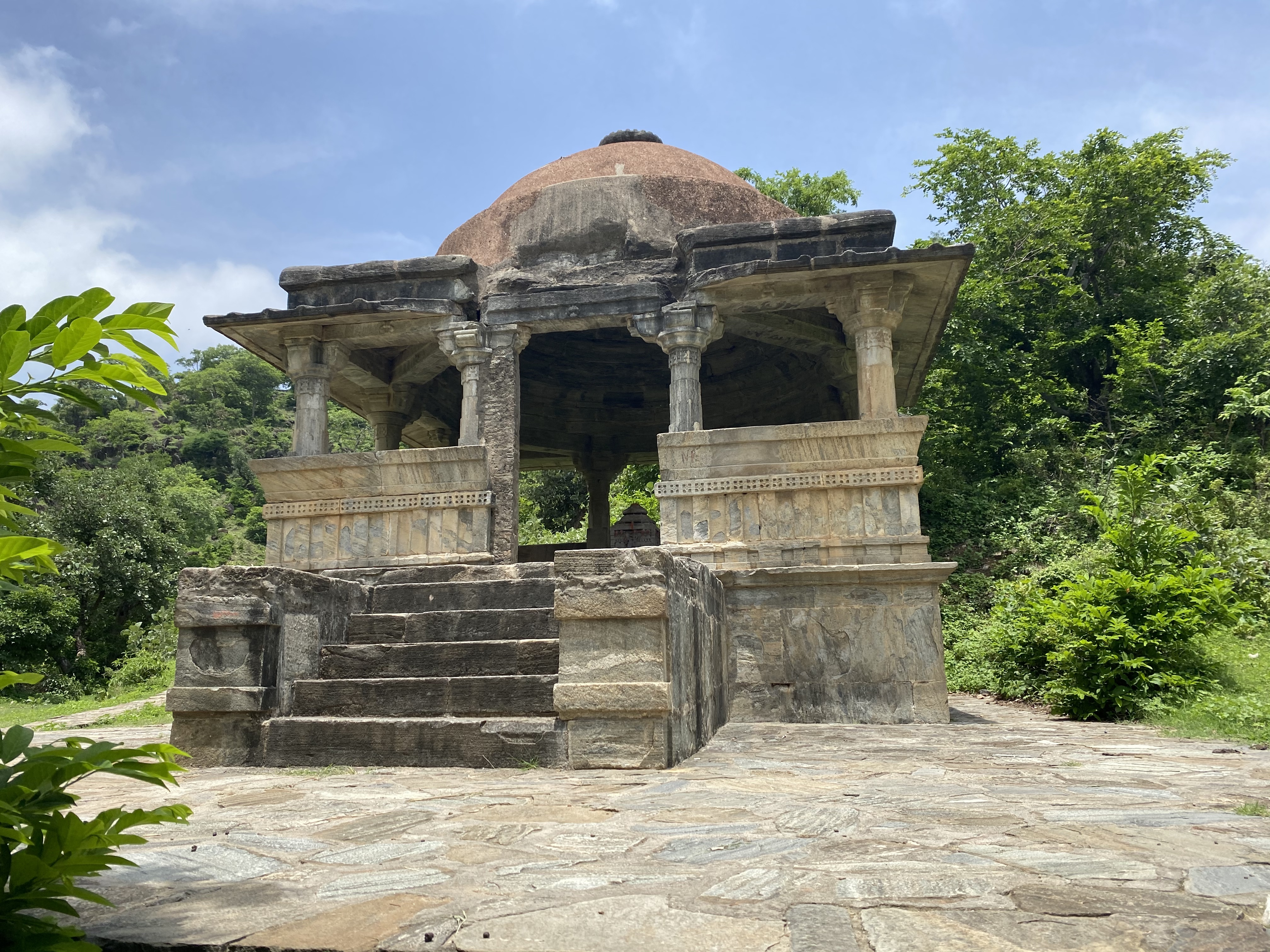
Cenotaph of Prithviraj Sisodiya

== Capture of Ajmer ==
Prithviraj captured Taragarh fort of Ajmer towards the end of the 15th century, after slaying Governor Mallu Khan. The fort is also called Taragarh, named after Prithviraj's wife Tarabai. It remained under the control of Mewar and later Maharana Sanga granted it to Karamchand Panwar.

== Family ==
The names of the wives of Prithviraj which are known:

- Tara Bai Solanki, daughter of Rao Surtan Solanki. Tara Burj, a bastion in Kumbhalgarh, is named after her.
- Pama De

Prithviraj also had a concubine, by whom he had a son, named Banvir, who was ruler of Mewar from 1536/37 to 1540.

== Death ==
Rao Jagmal of Sirohi was married to Prithviraj's sister, Ananda Bai, but their relations were not good. Prithvriraj went to Sirohi to punish Jagmal, but in the end pardoned him. It was suspected that Prithviraj died of poisoning by Rao Jagmal. Prithviraj died just after entering the Kumbhalgarh fort, where his cenotaph is still standing near Mamadeo Temple. Under the dome, there is a memorial stone with figures sculpted on all four sides. On one side, the figure riding a horse is Prithviraj (his horse's name was Sahanadiva). Out of the other four figures, the names of two are known: they were Prithviraj's wives Tarabai and Pama De. They committed sati after Prithviraj's death.

== Sources ==
- Rajawat, D.S. (1991). Glimpses of Rajasthan: Off the Beaten Track. Delta Publications.
- Dhoundiyal, B.N. (1966). Rajasthan District Gazetteers: Ajmer. Gazetteer of India. Ajmer. Hauptbd. Bharat Printers.
- Sarda, Har Bilas (1918). Maharana Sanga, The Hindupat (1st ed.). Ajmer: Scottish Mission Industries Company Limited.
- Kumbhalgarh, Archaeological Survey Of India, 2012 (1st ed.). New Delhi: The Director General, Archaeological Survey of India, Janpath, New Delhi-110011. 2012.
- Somani, Ram Vallabh (1976). History Of Mewar [From the earliest times to 1751 AD] (1st ed.). Jaipur: Shantidevi, Matheshwari Publications.
- Sarda, H.B. (1932). Maharana Kumbha: Sovereign, Soldier, Scholar. HardPress. p. 137. ISBN 978-1-290-94260-7.
- Sarda, H.B. (1941). Ajmer: Historical and Descriptive. Fine Art Printing Press.
