= Siege of Chittorgarh (1533–1535) =

1535 battle between the Gujarat Sultanate and the Kingdom of Mewar

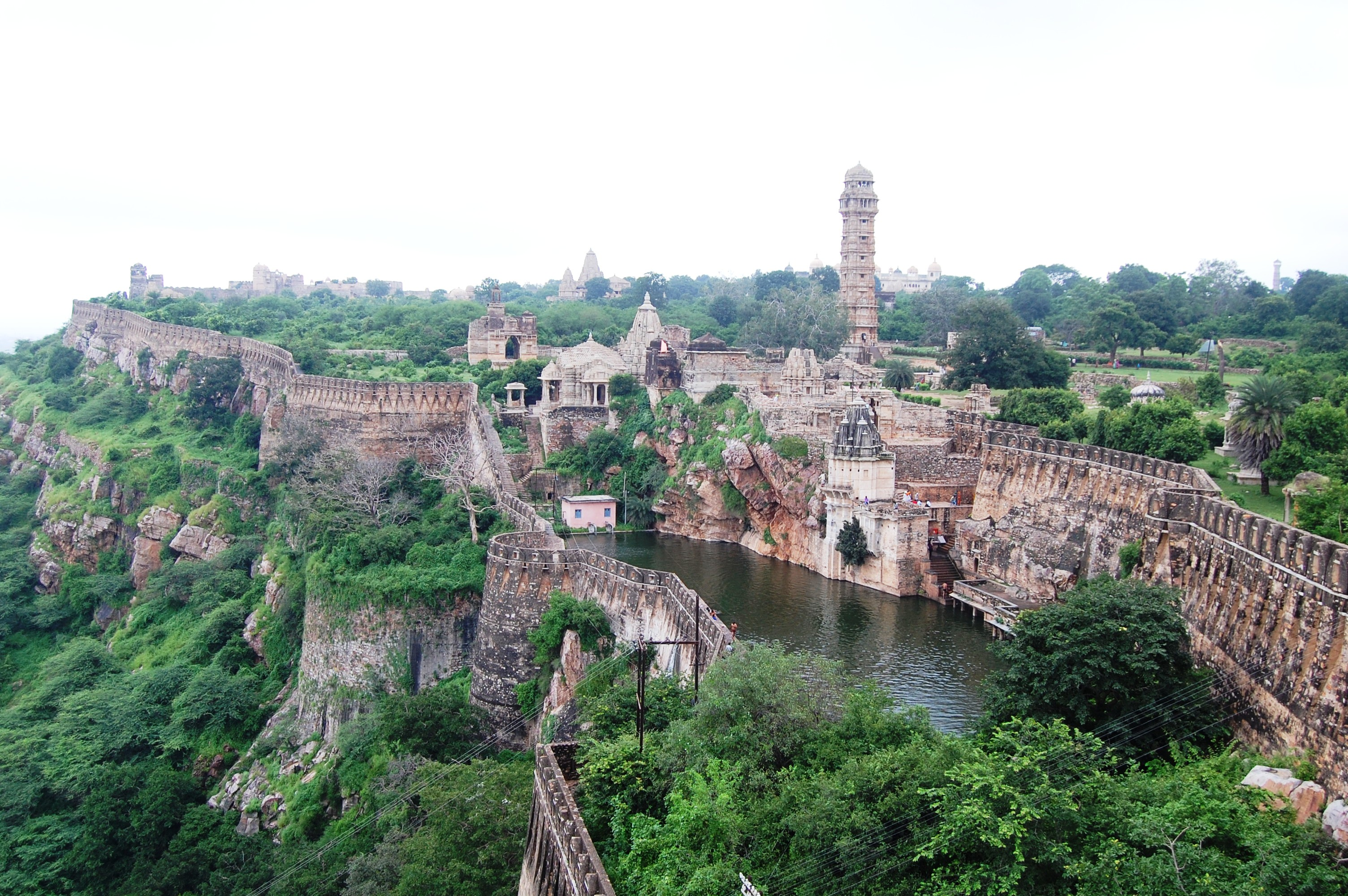
Date	First siege: 31 January 1533 – 24 March 1533 (1 month, 3 weeks and 3 days); Second siege: November 1534 – 8 March 1535
Location	Chittor Fort, Kingdom of Mewar, Rajasthan
Result	Gujarat Sultanate victory
Territorial changes	Gujarat Sultanate captured the Chittor Fort

Belligerents
Gujarat Sultanate; Khandesh Sultanate	Kingdom of Mewar

Commanders and leaders
Bahadur Shah; Miran Muhammad Shah II; Khudawand Khan; Mustafa Rumi Khan; Alif Khan; Tatar Khan; Malik Kallu; Sikandar Khan; Sadr Khan	Vikramaditya Singh; Rani Karnavati ‡‡ Rani Jawahir Bai †; Rawat Bagh Singh †; Hada Arjun †; Hada Narbad; Ratan Singh Hoat; Jhala Singh; Jhala Sajja; Prince Udai Singh; Solanki Bhairavdas; Dadia Bhan; Satta; Kamma; Padal Pal; Suraj Pal; Lakhotabari; Bhupat Rai

Strength
1,80,000 soldiers 1,000 elephants	Unknown

Casualties and losses
Unknown	32,000 killed in battle 13,000 died in Jauhar

The Siege of Chittorgarh was a military campaign launched by Sultan Bahadur Shah of Gujarat Sultanate against the fortress of Chittor, capital of the Kingdom of Mewar under Rana Vikramaditya. The conflicts witnessed two successive sieges between 1533 and 1535, leading to the fort's capture on 8 March 1535 by the Gujarati army.

Following the collapse of the Malwa Sultanate, rivalry over its territories ended earlier friendly ties between Gujarat Sultanate and Kingdom of Mewar. The first siege of Chittor occurred in early 1533 that ended in a temporary peace. In November 1534, the second siege began. Despite determined Rajput resistance led under the command of Rawat Bagh Singh, Gujarati artillery under Rumi Khan breached the defences. The defenders performed the ritual of saka while the women, including Rani Karnavati, committed jauhar. Chittor fell to Bahadur Shah.

== Background ==
When Bahadur Shah was a prince, he left Gujarat over his father Muzaffar Shah's favouritism toward brother Sikandar and stayed at Chittor, where Rana Sanga and his wife Rani Karnavati treated him as a son despite his killing their nephew. After accession Bahadur Shah kept friendly relations with Sanga and Ratan Singh. The latter congratulated him on accession, aided in Malwa conquest. Their friendly relation lasted until 1531 AD.

After the end of Malwa Sultanate both Mewar and Gujarat rivalled over the territories. While Bahadur Shah sought to occupy it directly, Vikramaditya Singh of Mewar tried to assert Rajput influence by backing local chiefs. In 1532, Bahadur Shah besieged Raisen then ruled by the Rajput chief Silhadi. Vikramaditya wanted to keep Raisen as a buffer against Gujarat. Vikramaditya sent 40–50 thousand troops under Bhupat Rai to relieve it, but Bahadur intercepted them, forced the Rana to retreat to Chittor. He viewed the attack on Raisen as a threat to his state. After the conquest of Raisen, Bahadur Shah launched a punitive expedition against Mewar for the intervention. Rana Vikramaditya was an unpopular ruler, mainly due to his short temper and arrogance. He had insulted several nobles and courtiers which caused many nobles to leave his court. Narsinghdeva, nephew of Rana Sanga who had fled to Gujarat and urged the Sultan to attack Chittor. He took the chance to invade Mewar.

== First siege ==
Bahadur Shah arranged troops and equipment for the Chittor campaign. He ordered Miran Muhammad Shah of Khandesh to advance with them to Mandu accompanied by the wazir Khudawand Khan. They reached Mandsaur unopposed. Rana Vikramaditya did not have enough strength for defence. He sued for peace through two emissaries offering to surrender the occupied Malwa territories, pay regular tribute, accept vassal status, and pledge loyalty to the Sultan. Shujat Khan delivered the messages to the Sultan who rejected the peace terms. He ordered Miran Muhammad Shah and Khudawand Khan to besiege Chittor. On 31 January 1533 the Gujarati army reached the vicinity of Chittor. Next morning, Bahadur Shah reached there with 5,000 men. He positioned his commanders to fully besiege the stronghold. Alif Khan at the Lakhote gate, Tatar Khan at the Hanuman gate, Malik Kallu and Sikandar Khan before the Suptburj, and Rumi Khan's artillery at key points. Rani Karnavati, mother of Vikramaditya, successfully united the disgruntled Rajput nobles to defend Chittor. Rani Karnavati sent Rakhi to Mughal emperor Humayun for help. Satish Chandra doubts historicity of the legend about Rani Karnavati sending a Rakhi to Humayun is not mentioned by any contemporary accounts. Rima Hooja mentions it a modern folklore. Seeing no chance of success, Rani Karnavati sent Bhupat Rai with peace proposals. Troubled by Burhan Nizam Shah's encroachment in Khandesh and potential conflict with Humayun, made Bahadur Shah to agree with peace terms with Mewar. The following terms were made:

1. Mewar agreed to give up all the occupied territories of Malwa.
2. Surrender jewelled waistband and crown taken from Mahmud Khalji II.
3. Pay 10 million tankas, 100 horse and 10 elephants as tribute.
4. Sent Prince Udai Singh to serve under Bahadur Shah.

Bahadur Shah raised the siege on 24 March 1533. He began to conquer other small states in Rajputana.

== Second siege ==
The flight of Udai Singh to Mewar led Bahadur Shah to second attack on Chittor. The Gujarat army numbered at 1,80,000 soldiers and 1,000 elephants. In November 1534, Bahadur Shah set out from Mandu. Miran Muhammad Shah II joined him. Bahadur Shah posted his generals at every strategic point and gave supreme command of the siege to Rumi Khan. Meanwhile Rani Karmavati again appealed to the disgruntled nobles, who responded at once as Rajputs flocked from all parts of Mewar. Rawat Bagh Singh, Hada Arjun, Hada Narbad, Ratan Singh Hoat, Jhala Singh and Jhala Sajja joined in defence of Chittor. Rana Vikramaditya and Prince Udai Singh were sent to Bundi for safety. Rawat Bagh Singh was appointed to command the garrison. He posted Solanki Bhairavdas at the Hanuman gate, Jhala Sajja at Ganesh Pal, while Dadia Bhan, Satta and Kamma also took up their defensive positions. Meanwhile Tatar Khan Lodi and Burhan-ul-Mulk attacked Bayana but were defeated and killed. Humayun then advanced to Gwalior to punish Bahadur Shah. The Gujarati sultan wanted to lift the siege and retire. However, Sadr Khan advice to urge Humayun that he was on jihad. Humayun stayed at Gwalior and spared Bahadur.

The Mewari army was able to fend off attacks until March 1535, after which the Gujarati artillery under Rumi Khan succeeded in breaking through the fort defences. Rao Doorga, Arjun Hada and the Chundawat brothers were killed after trying to repel the Gujarati assaults. Hada Arjun lost 500 troops. One of Rana Sanga's widows, Rani Jawahir Bai Rathor, then donned her armour and led the sortie with Mewari soldiers against the Sultan's army. She wreaked havoc on the Gujarati ranks and was killed after inflicting casualties to the enemy. Simultaneous Gujarati attacks on Padal Pal, Suraj Pal and Lakhotabari followed. The women of Chittor including Rani Karnavati committed jauhar and the soldiers prepared for Saka, which was led by Rawat Bagh Singh of Deola. Udai Singh's faithful nurse Panna Dai escaped to Bundi to her master. According to Kaviraj Shyamaldas, the 32,000 Rajput soldiers were killed; while 13,000 Rajput women died in jauhar. On 8 March 1535, the fortress of Chittor was captured by Bahadur Shah after three months of siege.

== Aftermath ==
According to J. Chaube, Bahadur Shah blundered by rejecting the peace terms. The support of Rana Vikramaditya would have helped against Humayun. He failed to the realize the consequences. The conquest of Chittor provoked direct conflict with the Mughal emperor which ultimately caused his successive defeats in Malwa and Gujarat. Before Bahadur Shah could consolidate his power in Chittor, Humayun invaded his territory, prompting him to abandon it. Rana Vikramaditya soon occupied it after Bahadur's departure.

== Bibliography ==
- Commissariat, M. S. (1938). A History of Gujarat. Vol. I. Ahmadabad: Longmans Green & Co. Ltd.
- Tiwari, Arya Ramchandra G. (1958). "BAHADUR SHAH'S CONQUEST OF CHITTOR — ITS CHRONOLOGY". Proceedings of the Indian History Congress. 21. Indian History Congress: 302–305. ISSN 2249-1937. JSTOR 44145216.
- Prasad, Ishwari (18 December 2024). A Short History of Muslim Rule in India: From the Conquest of Islam to the Death of Aurangzeb. Fazlul Karim. ISBN 978-81-976328-7-7.
- Chandra, Satish (2007). History of Medieval India: 800-1700. Orient BlackSwan. ISBN 978-81-250-3226-7.
- Hooja, Rima (2006). A History of Rajasthan, Section:The State of Mewar, AD 1500 – AD 1600. Rupa & Company. ISBN 9788129108906.
- Mankekar, D. R. (1976). Mewar Saga: The Sisodias' Role in Indian History. Vikas Publishing House. ISBN 978-0-7069-0416-1.
- Chaube, J. (1975). History of Gujarat Kingdom, 1458-1537. Munshiram Manoharlal Publishers. ISBN 978-0-88386-573-6.
- Somani, Ramavallabha (1976). History of Mewar, from Earliest Times to 1751 A.D. Mateshwari Publications.
