= Stambha =

Column in Indian architecture

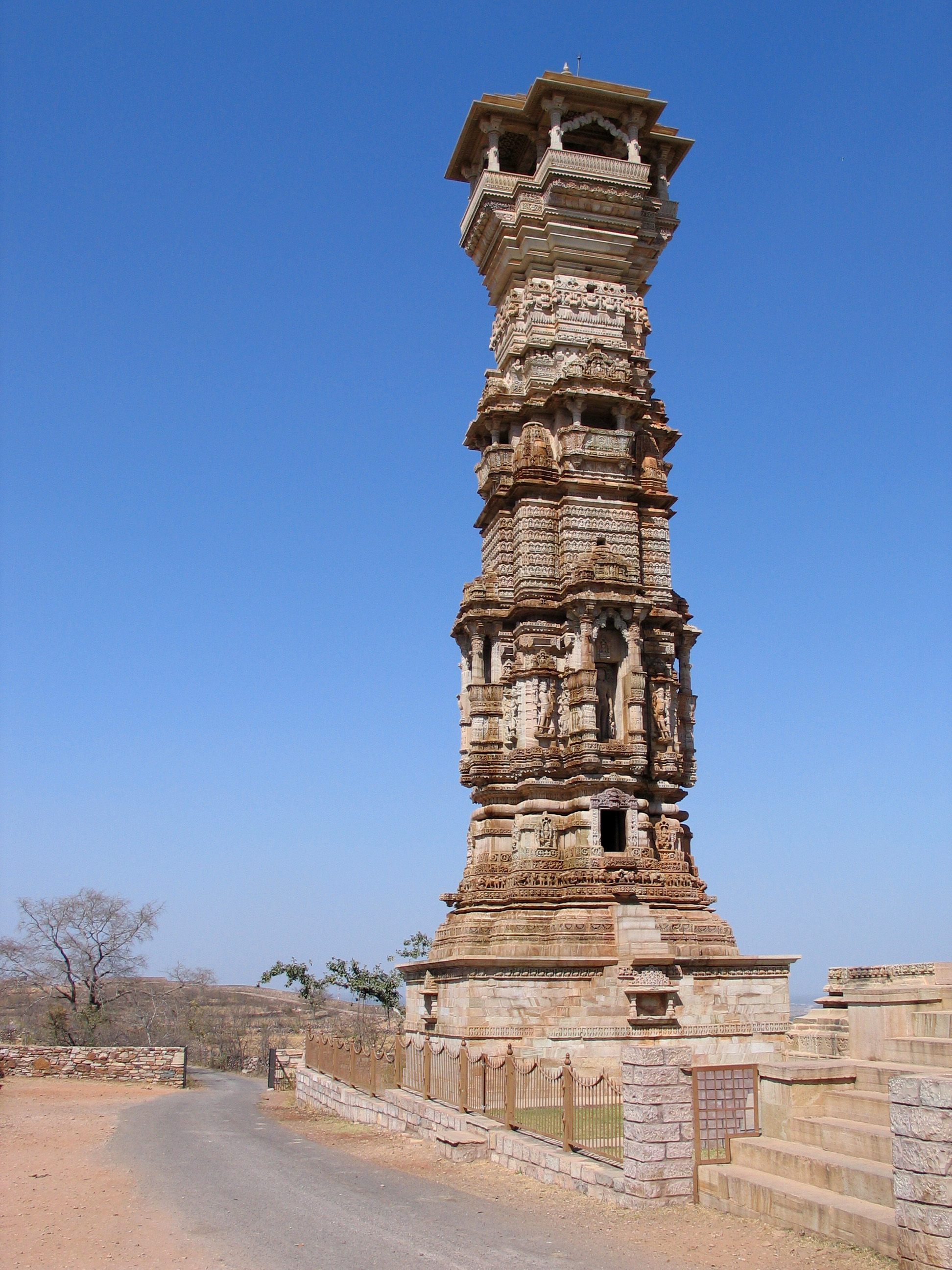
Kirti Stambha at Chittorgarh fort in Rajasthan, India

A stambha (Sanskrit: स्तम्भ, romanized: stambha) is a pillar or a column employed in Indian architecture. A stambha sometimes bears inscriptions and religious emblems.

== Religion ==
In Hindu mythology, a stambha is believed to be a cosmic column that functions as a bond, joining heaven (Svarga) and earth (Prithvi). A number of Hindu scriptures, including the Atharva Veda, feature references to stambhas. In the Atharva Veda, a celestial stambha has been described as an infinite scaffold, which supports the cosmos and material creation.

In the legend of Narasimha, an avatara of Vishnu, the deity appears from a stambha to slay the asura Hiranyakashipu. The stambha has been interpreted to represent the axis mundi in this myth by Deborah A. Soifer.

== Architecture ==
Stambhas are popularly employed in Indian architecture. Different stambhas serve different purposes, including the following:

- A dhvaja stambha (flagstaff tower) is placed opposite the main shrine, on an axis with the main deity.
- A kirti stambha (glorious tower) and vijaya stambha (victory tower) are erected to commemorate victories.
- The most well-known stambhas of India are the Ashoka Stambha (Pillars of Ashoka) — erected during the reign of Ashoka, spread across the subcontinent, bearing different types of royal edicts.
- The Adi Purana — a huge manastambha — stands in front of the samavasarana of the tirthankaras, which is regarded to causes entrants to a samavasarana to shed their pride.

== Gallery ==
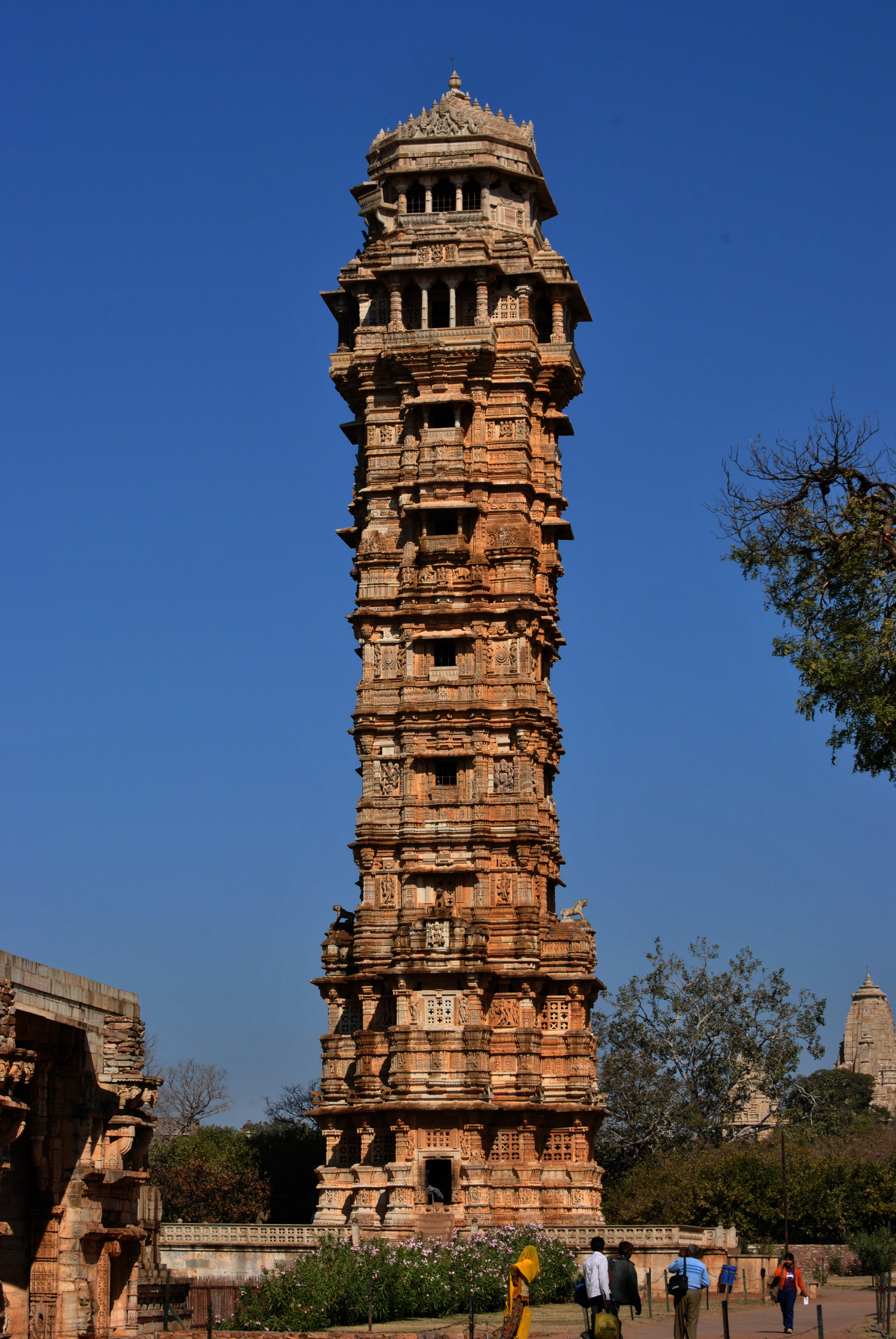
Vijay Stambha at Chittorgarh fort

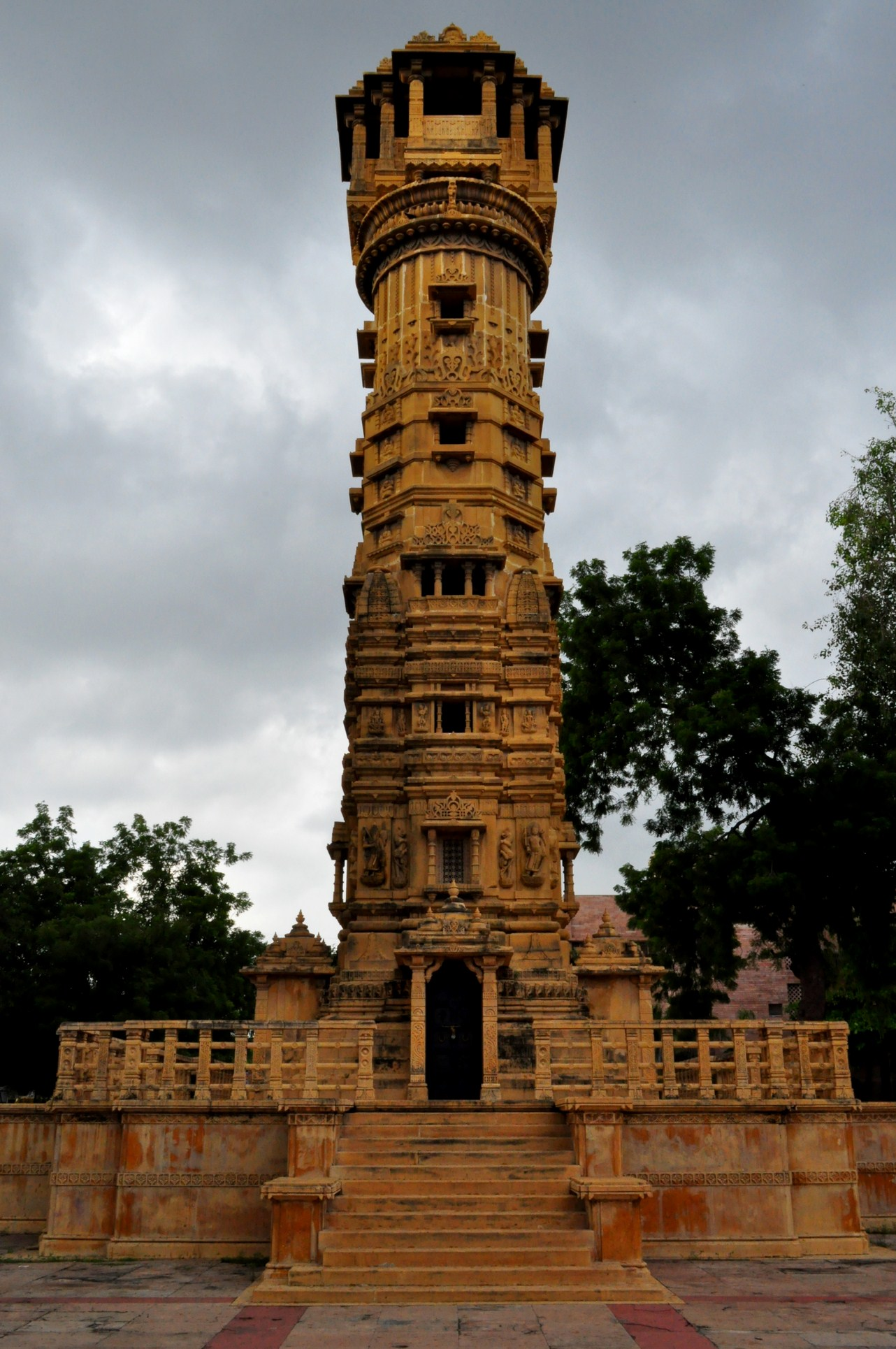
Kirti Stambha of Hutheesing Jain Temple

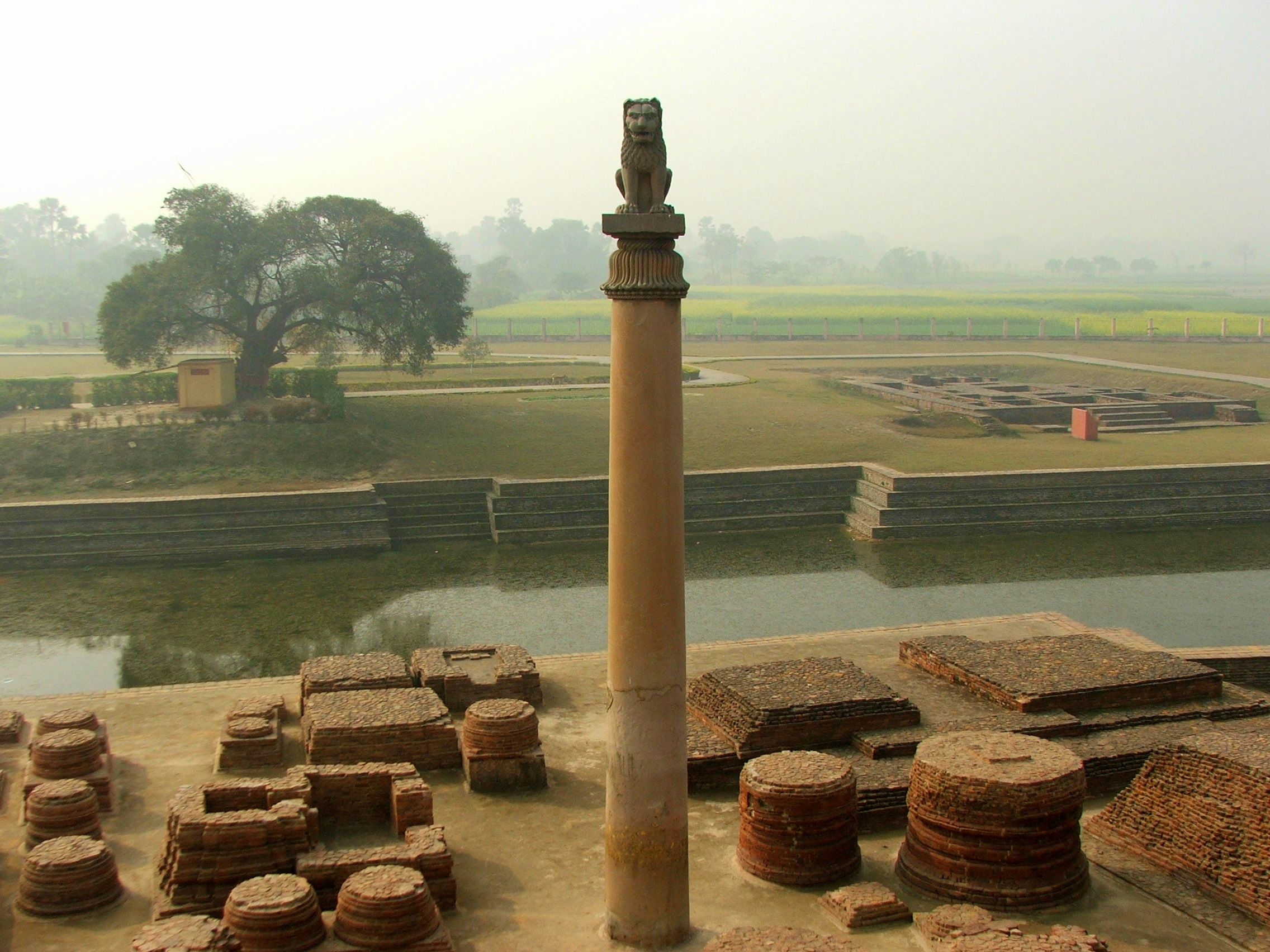
Ashoka Pillar

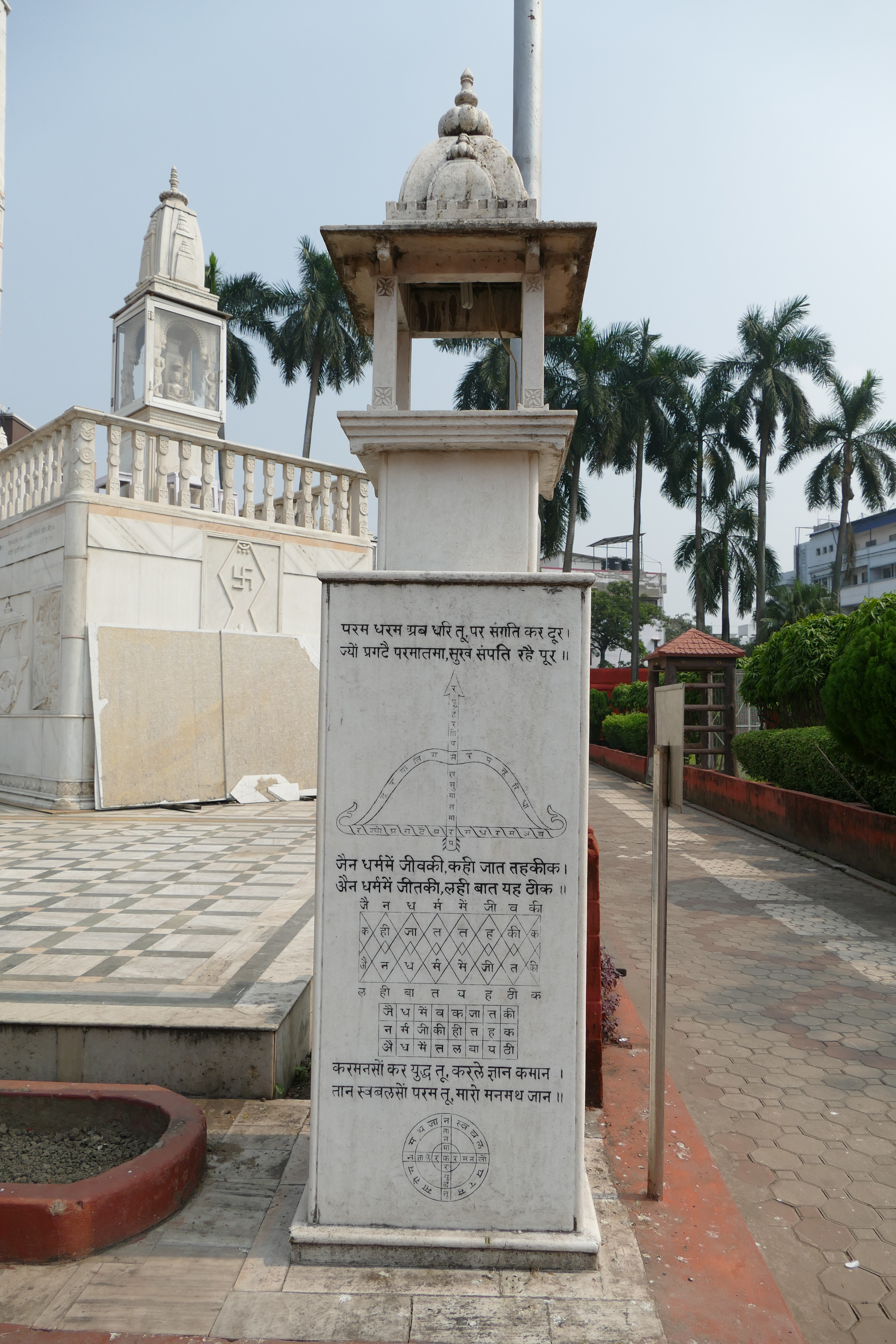
The stambha of Parshwanath Jain Mandir, Belgachhiya

== See also ==
- Related topics
  - Hutheesing Jain Temple
  - Ashoka's Major Rock Edicts
  - Dhar iron pillar
  - History of metallurgy in South Asia
  - Iron pillar of Delhi
  - Pillars of Ashoka
  - Heliodorus pillar
- Other similar topics
  - Early Indian epigraphy
  - Indian rock-cut architecture
  - List of rock-cut temples in India
  - Outline of ancient India
  - South Indian Inscriptions
  - Tagundaing

== Sources ==
- Dictionary of Hindu Lore and Legend (ISBN 0-500-51088-1) by Anna Dallapiccola.
