= Vidyadhar Johrapurkar =

Vidyadhar Pasusa Johrapurkar, also spelled as Vidyadhar Pasusa Joharapurkar (born 1935), is a Sanskritist, social anthropologist, and historian who specializes in Jainism and Jain philosophy.

== Early life and education ==
Born in Nagpur, Johrapurkar completed his M.A. in 1956 and Ph.D. in 1959 from Nagpur University.

Johrapurkar's early love for reading was inspired by his grandfather Nemasav's personal library. As a young man, he joined the Jain Svayamsevak Sangh, which sparked his interest in social service. His close friend Shantikumar Killedar encouraged his study of Indian history and social anthropology.

== Career ==
He worked as a Professor of Sanskrit in the Department of Education under the Government of Madhya Pradesh. Throughout his career, he taught Sanskrit at various government colleges, including those in Nagpur, Jabalpur, Jaora, Mandala, and Bhopal. He eventually retired as Professor and Head of the Department of Sanskrit at Government College, Keolari, District Seoni, Madhya Pradesh.

== Literary work ==
Johrapurkar has published nearly 100 scholarly articles in well-known magazines like Sanmati and Anekanta. He has also been interviewed by Nagpur Doordarshan and Radio Nagpur.

One of his notable works, Bhattaraka-Sampradaya, offers a detailed reconstruction of Digambar Jain monastic lineages through the study of Jain inscriptions.

=== List of publications ===
- Yashastilaka - Hindi Kathasara (Abridged Hindi version of the Yashastilaka)
- Tilakamanjari - Hindi Kathasara (Abridged Hindi version of Dhanapala's Tilakamanjari)
- Bhattaraka Sampradaya (Research work on the historical and anthropological aspects of Digambara Jain Bhattarakas, published by Jain Sanskriti Sanrakshak Sangh, Solapur, in 1958)
- Dharmamrta (Study of a 15th-century Marathi work on Jainism)
- Jina-Sagara Kavita (Compilation of 18th-century Marathi devotional poetry)
- Tirthavandanasamgraha (Collection of essays on Jain Tirthas, published by Jain Sanskriti Sanrakshak Sangh, Solapur, in 1965)
- Vishva-Tattva Prakasha by Bhavasena Traividya (Hindi translation of a 13th-century Sanskrit work, published by Jain Sanskriti Sanrakshak Sangh, Solapur, in 1964)
- Pramaprameya by Bhavasena Traividya (Hindi translation of a 13th-century Sanskrit work on formal logic)
- Jain Shilalekha Samgraha, Part 4 (Compilation and critical study of Jain epigraphy, published by Bharatiya Jnanapitha, New Delhi),1961
- Jain Shilalekha Samgraha, Part 5 (Compilation and critical study of Jain epigraphy, published by Bharatiya Jnanapitha, New Delhi), 1970
- Kuvalayamala - Marathi Kathasara (Abridged Marathi version of the Prakrit classic Kuvalayamala)
- Svayambhustotra (Marathi translation of Acarya Samantabhadra's Svayambhustotra)
- Vira Shasana ke Prabhavaka Acarya - Purvardha (Historical research on early and medieval Jain monks, published by Bharatiya Jnanapitha, New Delhi, in 1975)
- Viveka Vilasa (Translation of a 15th-century Gujarati text)
- Bhagavan Mahavira (Short introduction in Hindi on Jina Mahavira)
- Bhagavan Mahavira (Short introduction in Marathi on Jina Mahavira)
- Pracina Marathi Kathapancaka (Adaptation of 17th and 18th-century Marathi short stories)
- Marathi Jain Sahitya (Published as part of Jain Sahitya Ka Brhad Itihasa, Part 7, by Parshvanatha Vidyapitha, Varanasi)
- Bagherwal Jati Ka Itihasa (Historical study of the Bagherval Jain community, published by Akhil Bharatiya Digambara Jain Bagherval Sangh, Kota, in 2001)
