= A Bao A Qu (disambiguation) =

A Bao A Qu is a fictional Malayan legend invented by Argentinian writer Jorge Luis Borges.

A Bao A Qu may also refer to:

- A Bao A Qu (album), an album by Virginia Astley
- "A Bao A Qu" (song), a song by Japanese rock band Boris
- A Baoa Qu, an asteroid fortress in the anime Mobile Suit Gundam
