= Bagherwal =

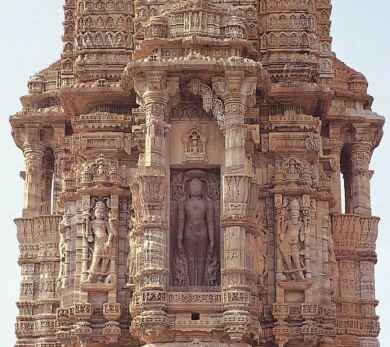
The Kirti Stambha at Chittor

Bagherwal is a digambar Jain community originally from Baghera, a princely state in Rajasthan. The town is situated in Ajmer district of Rajasthan near Kekri.

== History ==
Stone inscriptions from the eleventh century A.D. refer to this community as located in Chittorgarh, Ranthambore and Mandalgarh at various times. During the foreign aggression of North India in the twelfth century, the community left these forts and spread to villages and towns of Rajputana and Madhya Pradesh. About six hundred years ago, three hundred families migrated to Maharashtra from Chittor under the leadership of Jijaji and Punaji Khatod. This group settled in Maharashtra.

All community members are followers of the Jain religion (Digambar). The community has built Jain temples in Rajasthan, Madhya Pradesh, Maharashtra. Kirti Stambh, built by one of the community members, Jijaji Kathod, at Chittor fort is a historical monument. It is a seven-story structure built in the twelfth century AD.

Different clans have followed different monastic lineages, Mula Sangh Balatkara Gana, Mula Sangh Sena Gana and Kashtha Sangha. Their center in Karanja Lad had thus seats of three bhattarakas of each of the three traditions.

Pandit Ashadhar, a scholar of Jain philosophy in the 13th century, writer of about 100 manuscripts in Sanskrit, was born in this community.

== Publications ==
=== Community publications ===
- Bagherwal Web Site
- Bagherwal Sandesh (Monthly news magazine)
- Bagherwal Samaj Sandesh (Monthly news magazine)
- Pratibimb ( quarterly magazine )

=== Books published about community ===
- Bagherwal Jati Ithias by Vidyadhar Johrapurkar
- Pandit Ashadhar. Vyaktitva and Kratitava by Nemi Chand Dongaonkar
