= Manastambha =

Holy pillar in Jain temples

In Jainism, a manastambha (from Sanskrit 'column of honour') is a pillar that is often constructed in front of Jain temples or large Jain statues. In North India, they are topped by four Tirthankara images.

According to the Digambara Jain texts like Adi Purana and Tiloyapannati, a huge manastambha stands in front of the samavasarana (divine preaching hall) of the tirthankaras, which causes someone entering a samavasarana to shed their pride.

A monolithic manastambha is a standard feature in the Jain temples of Moodabidri. They include a statue of Brahmadeva on the top as a guardian yaksha.

== Examples ==
Some of the well known Jain manastambhas are:

- Kirti Stambha of Chittorgarh. The Vijaya Stambha was inspired by this.
- Manastambhas of Devagarh
- Manastambhas of Moodabidri
- Manastambhas of Shravanabelagola
- Manastambha at Shikharji at Madhuvan

Manastambhas in South India are generally monolithic.

== Photo gallery ==
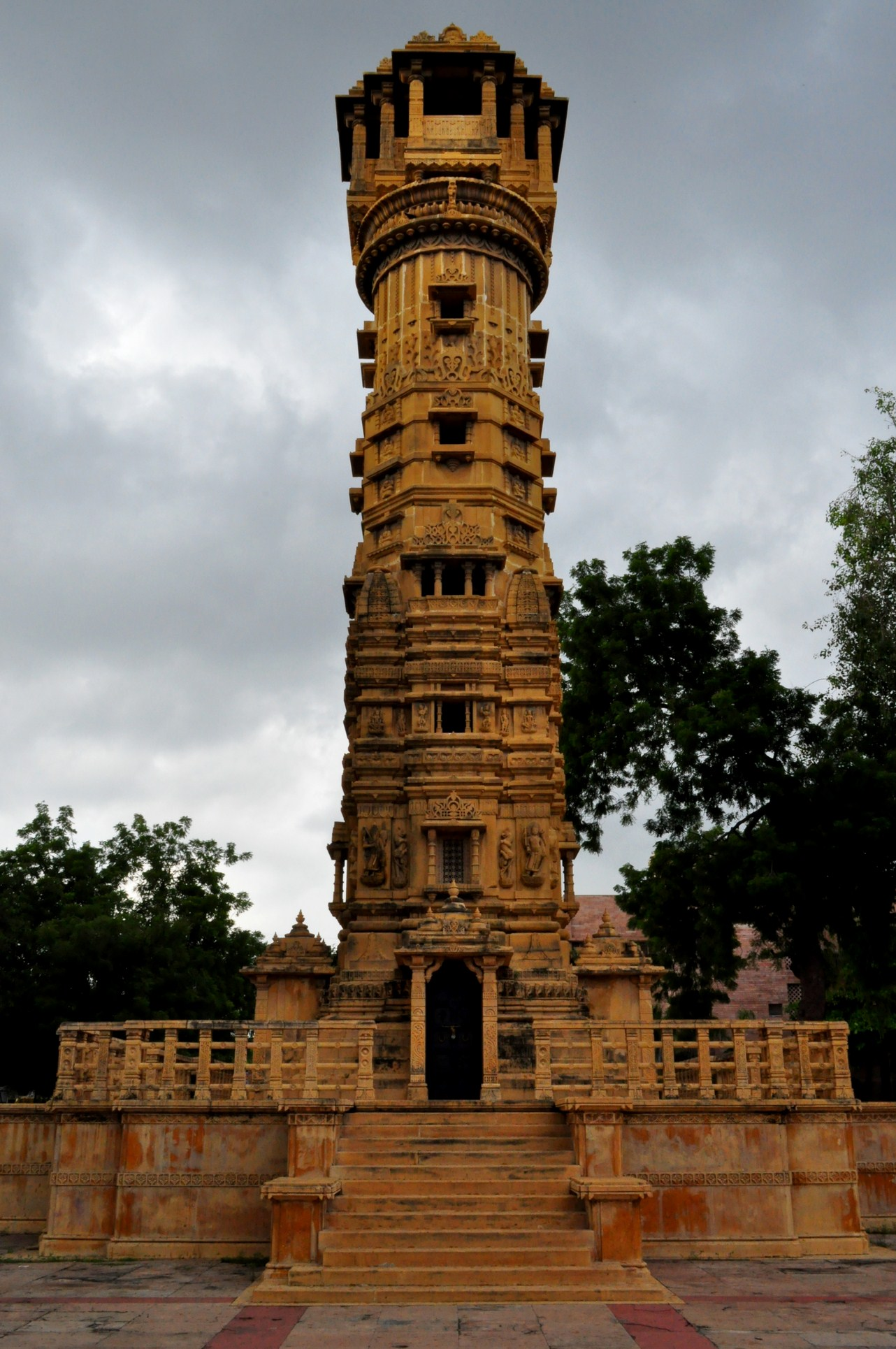
Kirti Stambha of Hutheesing Jain Temple

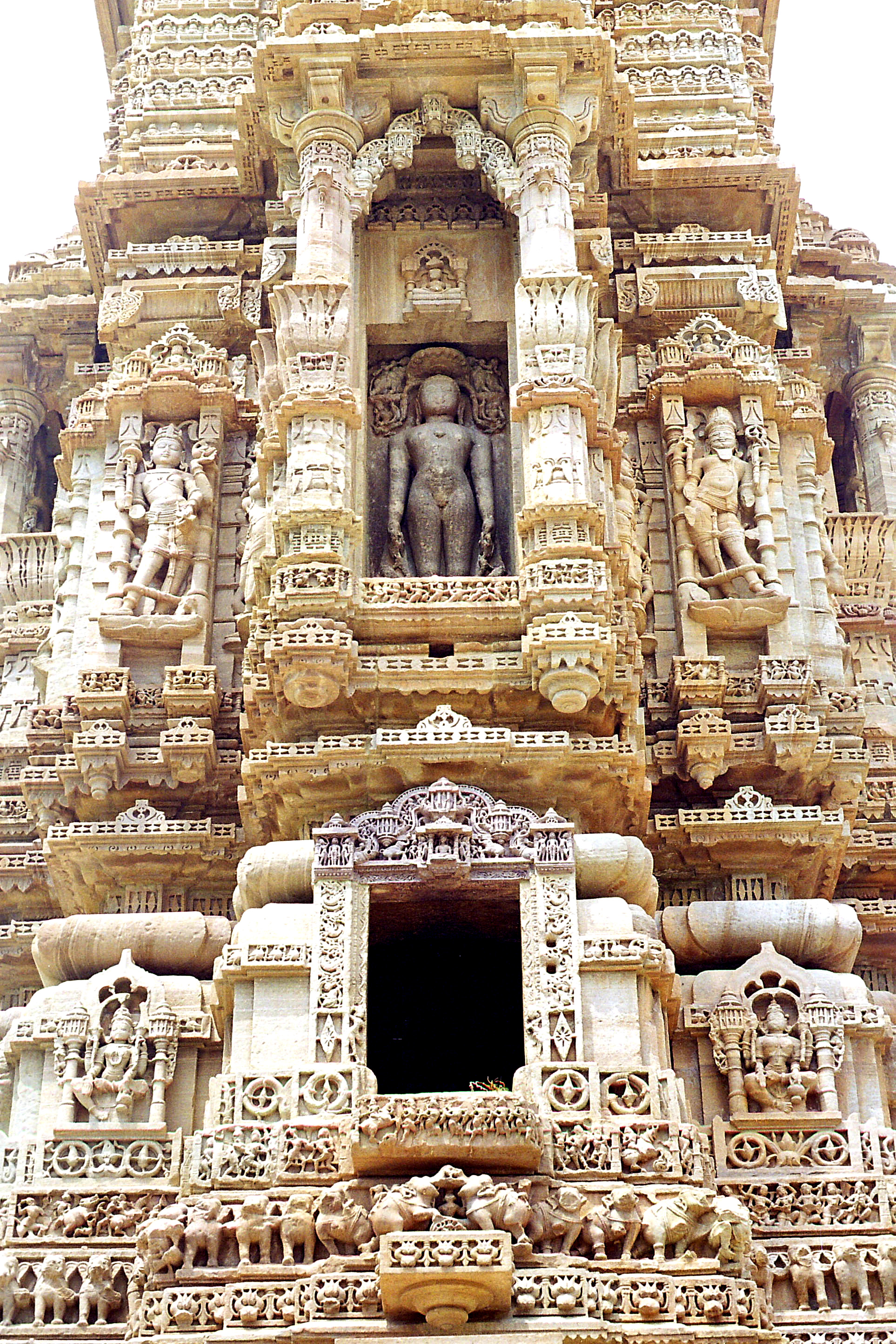
Kirti Stambha at Chittorgarh fort

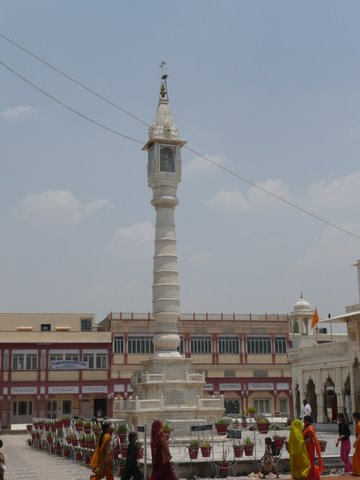
Manastambha at Shri Mahavirji Temple, Rajasthan, India

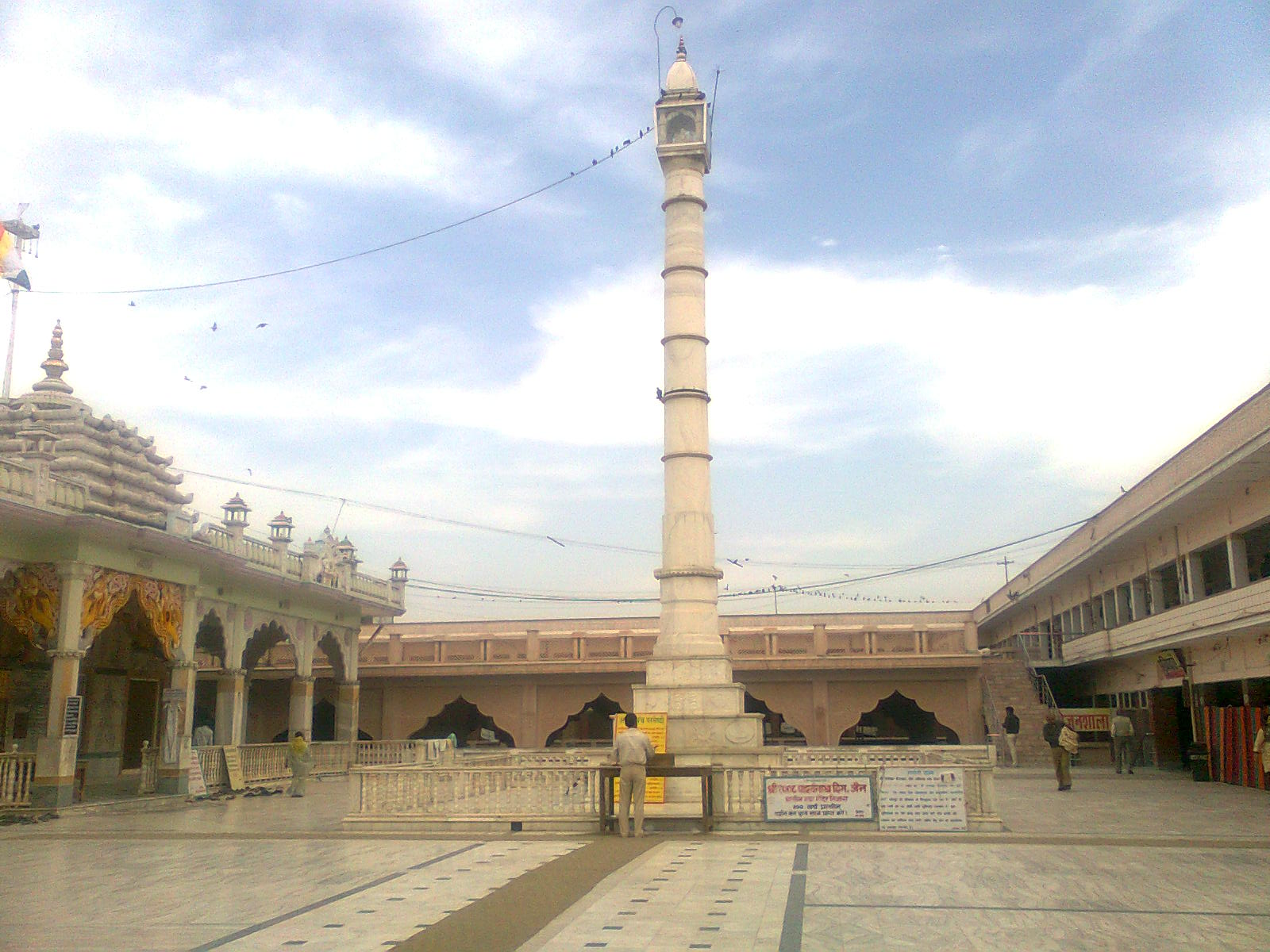
Manastambha at Tijara Jain Temple, Rajasthan, India

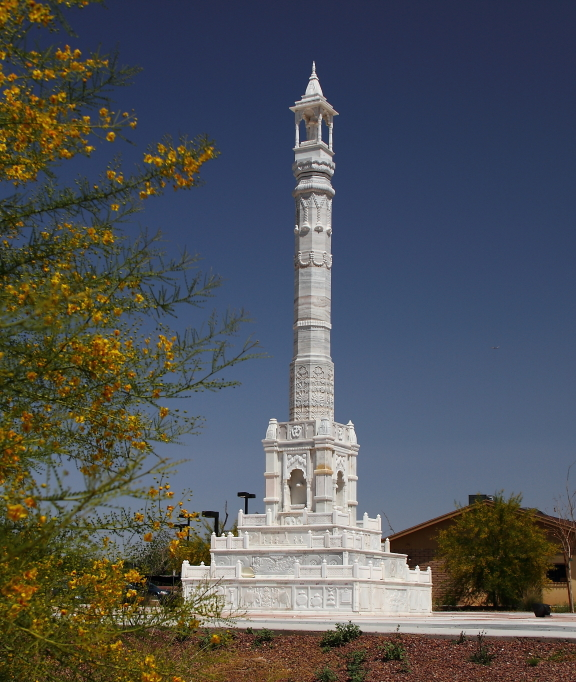
Manastambha at Jain Center of Greater Phoenix (JCGP), Phoenix, Arizona, United States

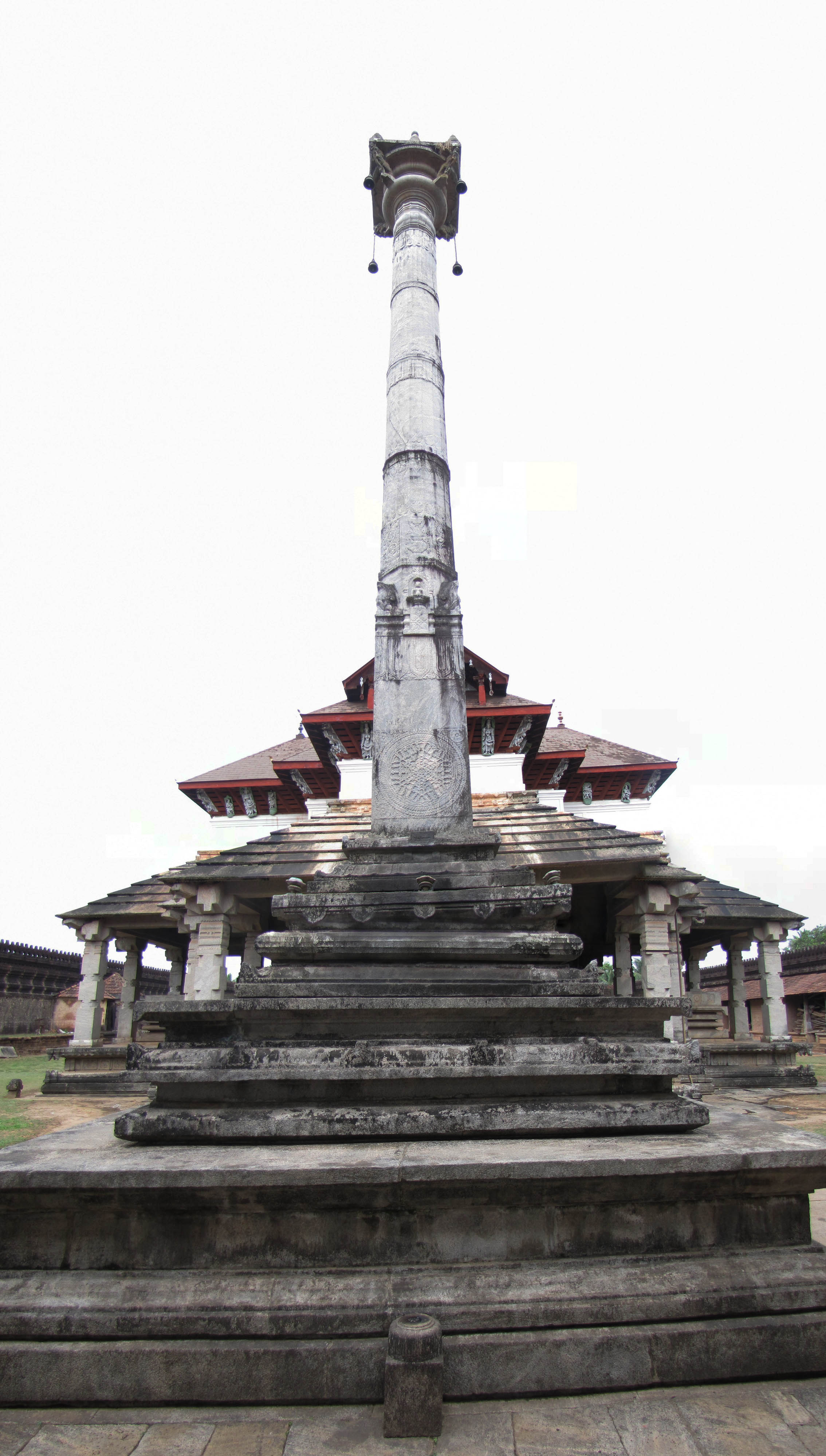
Manastambha at Saavira Kambada Basadi, Moodbidri, Karnataka, India

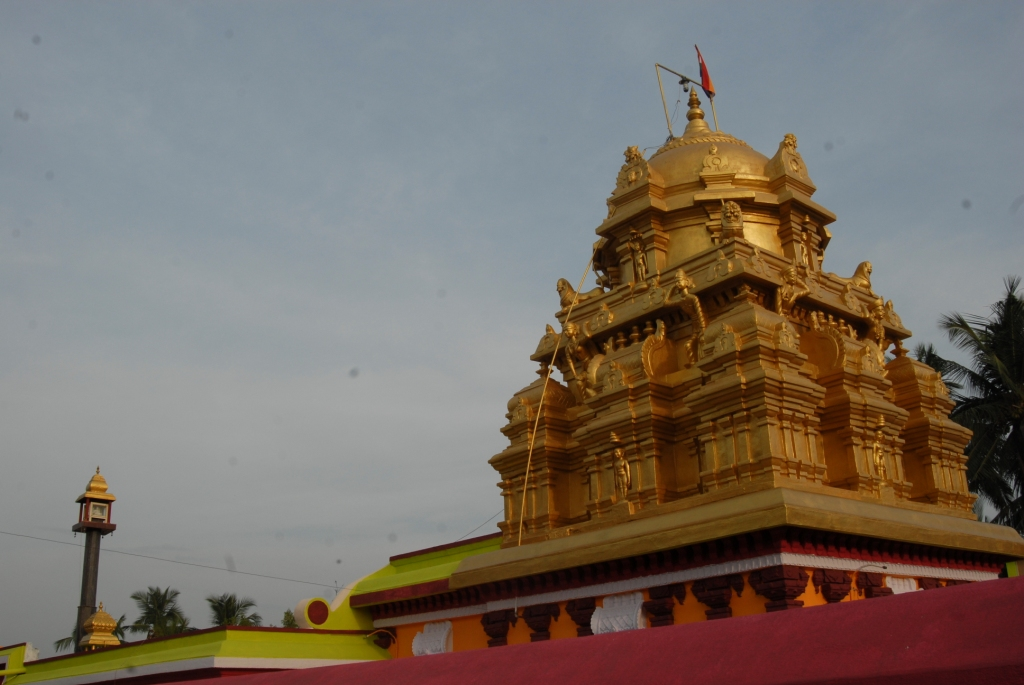
Desur Jain temple and Manastambha at Desur, Tiruvanamalai, Tamil Nadu, India

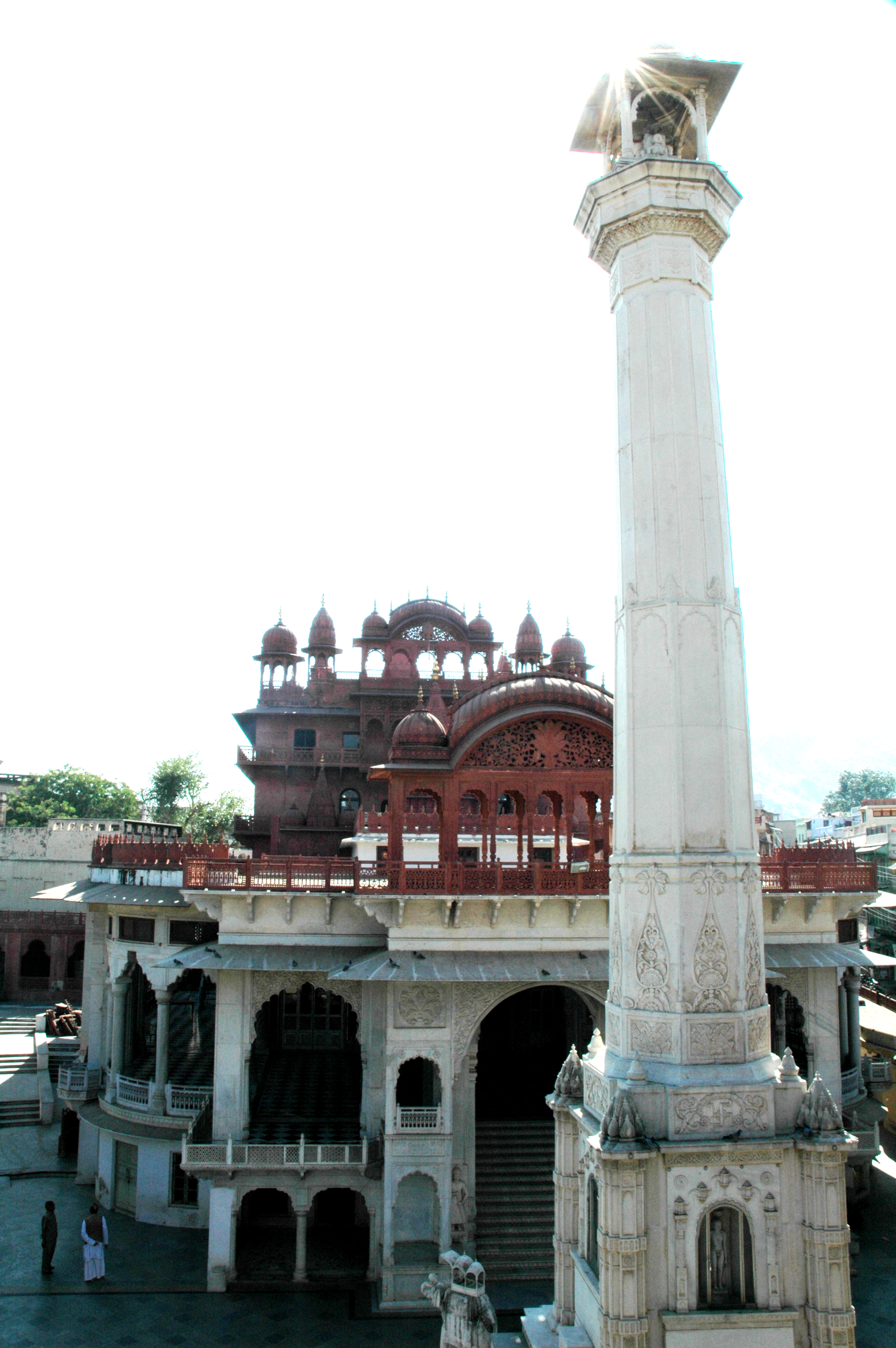
Manasthamba at Ajmer Jain temple

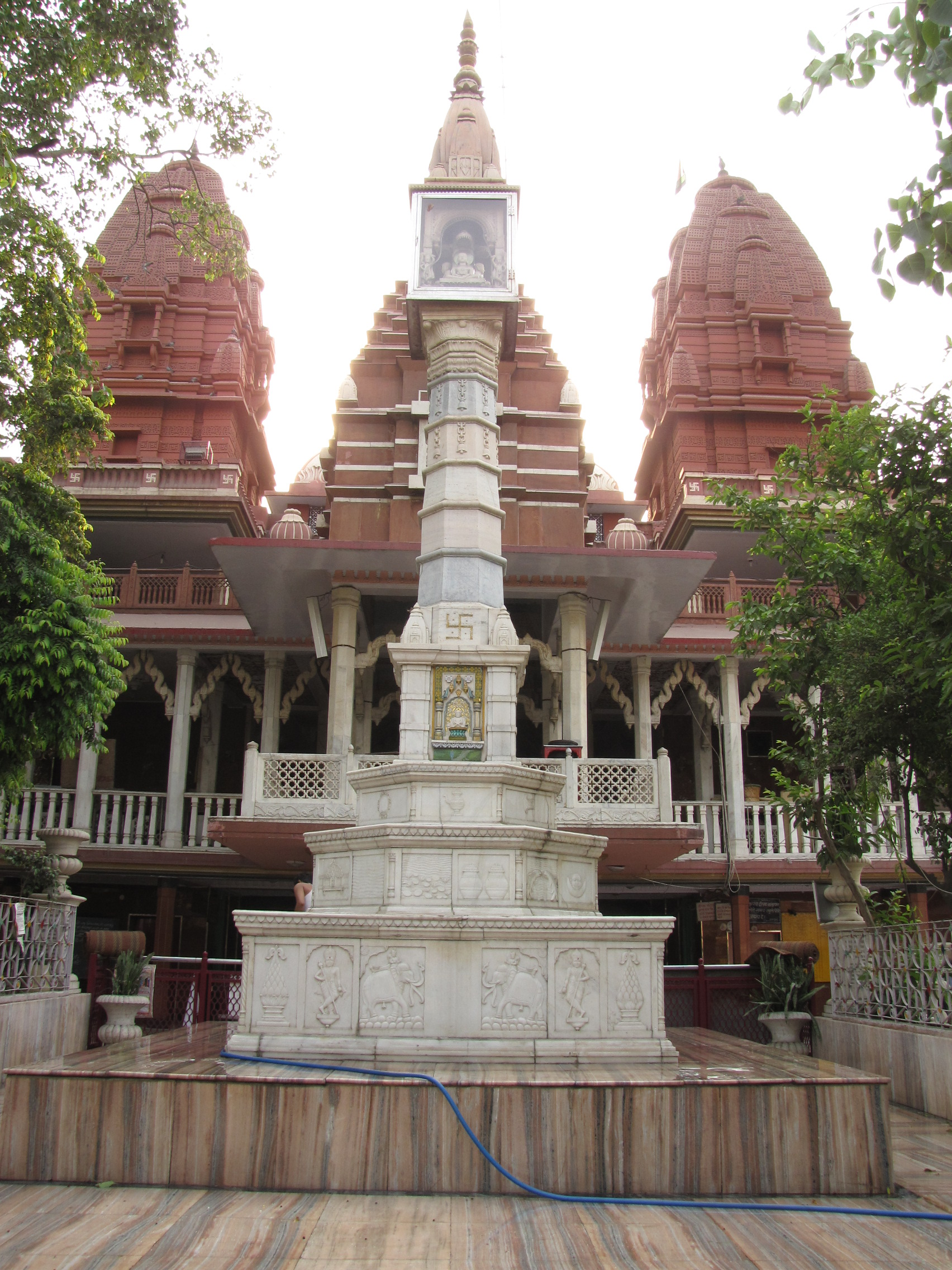
Manastambha at Lal Mandir

== See also ==
- Jain Temples
- Tirthas
