= Hutheesing Jain Temple =

Śvetāmbara Jain Temple in Gujarat, India

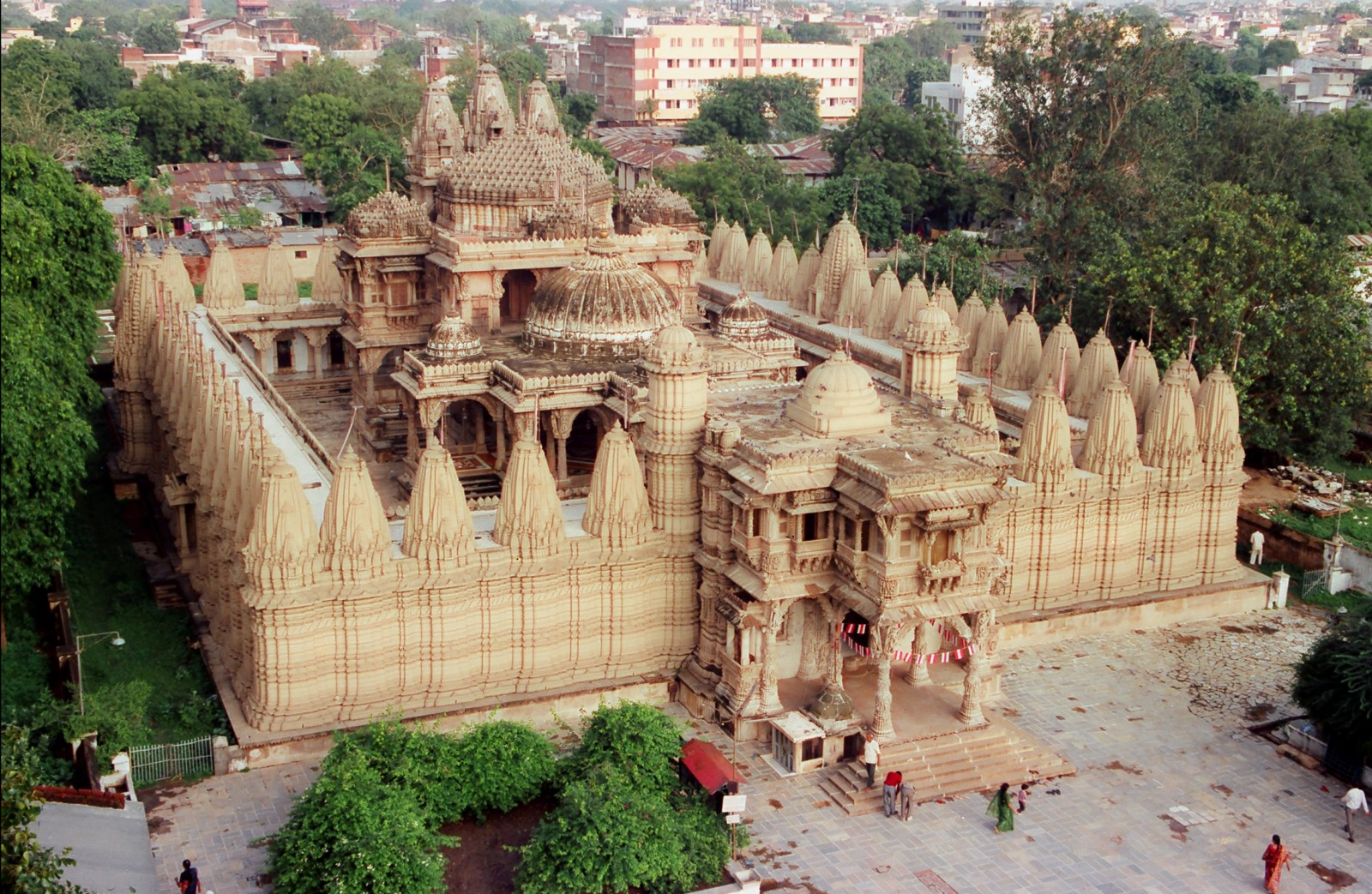
- Hutheesing Temple

- Location within Ahmedabad Location within Gujarat

Religion
- Affiliation: Jainism
- Sect: Śvetāmbara
- Deity: Dharmanatha
- Festival: Mahavir Janma Kalyanak

Location
- Municipality: Ahmedabad
- State: Gujarat
- Country: India
- Interactive map of Hutheesing Jain Temple
- Coordinates: 23°2′27.92″N 72°35′22.6″E

Architecture
- Creator: Premchand Salat
- Established: 1848
- Temple: 1

Hutheesing Temple is a Jain temple in Ahmedabad in Gujarat, India. It was constructed in 1848 by the Hutheesing family. The temple blends the old Maru-Gurjara temple architecture style with new architectural elements of haveli in its design.

== History ==
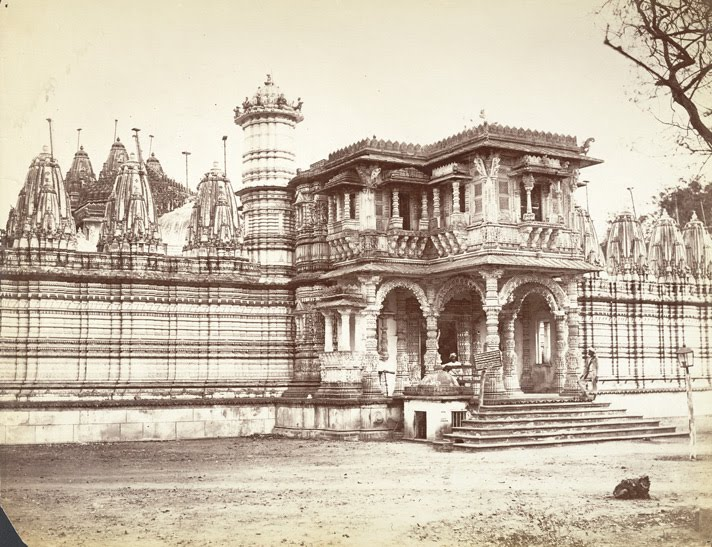
The temple circa 1880

The construction of the temple was originally planned and initiated by Hutheesing Kesarisinh, a wealthy trader of Ahmedabad. Following his death at the age of 49, construction was supervised and completed by his wife, Harkunwar. The total cost was approximately ₹10 lakh (equivalent to ₹75 crore or US$7.8 million in 2023). The chief temple architect was Premchand Salat. The temple is located outside the Delhi Darwaza.

Lockwood de Forest, a business associate of Muganbhai Hutheesing, the son of Sheth Hutheesing, estimated the cost as "over a million dollars". The temple was built during a severe famine in Gujarat. Construction of the temple employed hundreds of skilled artisans, supporting them for a period of two years.

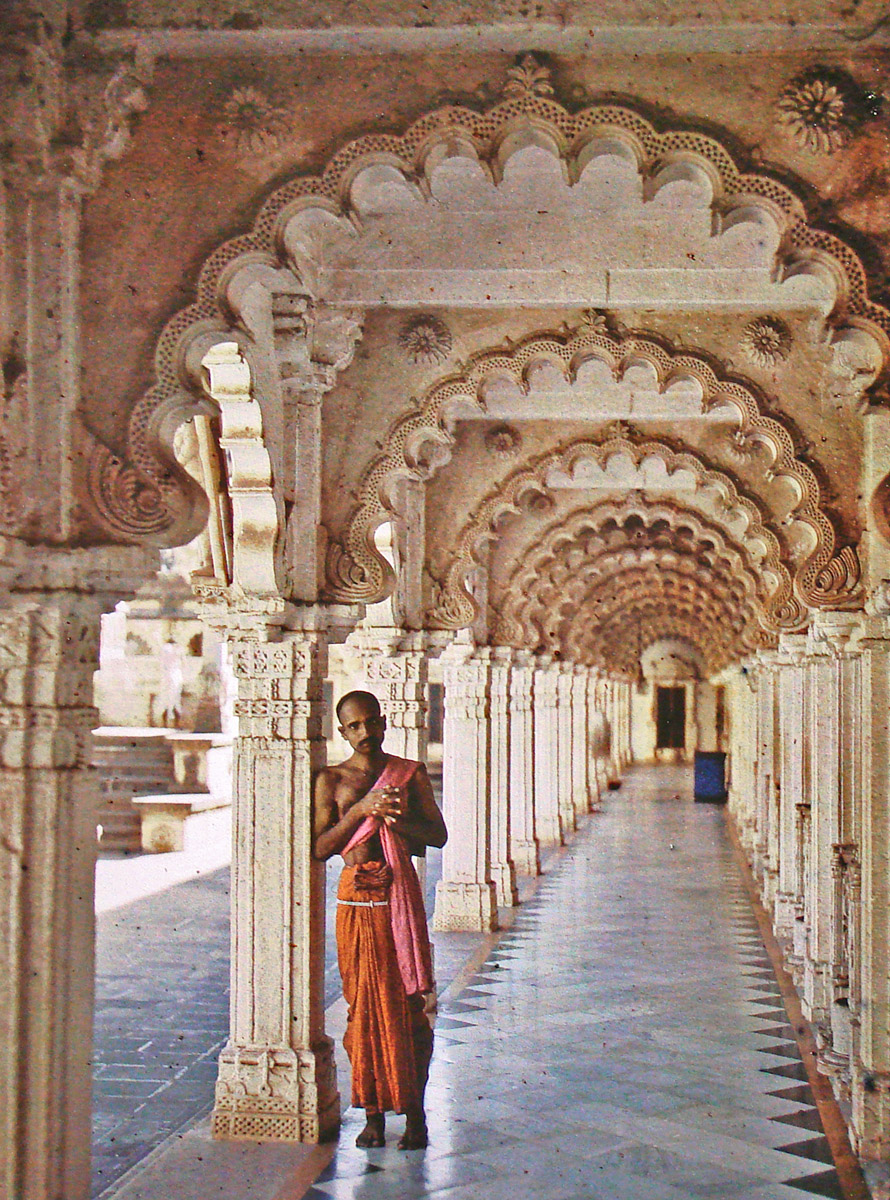
Temple officiant in 1913

The temple is managed by a Hutheesing family trust.

== Architecture ==
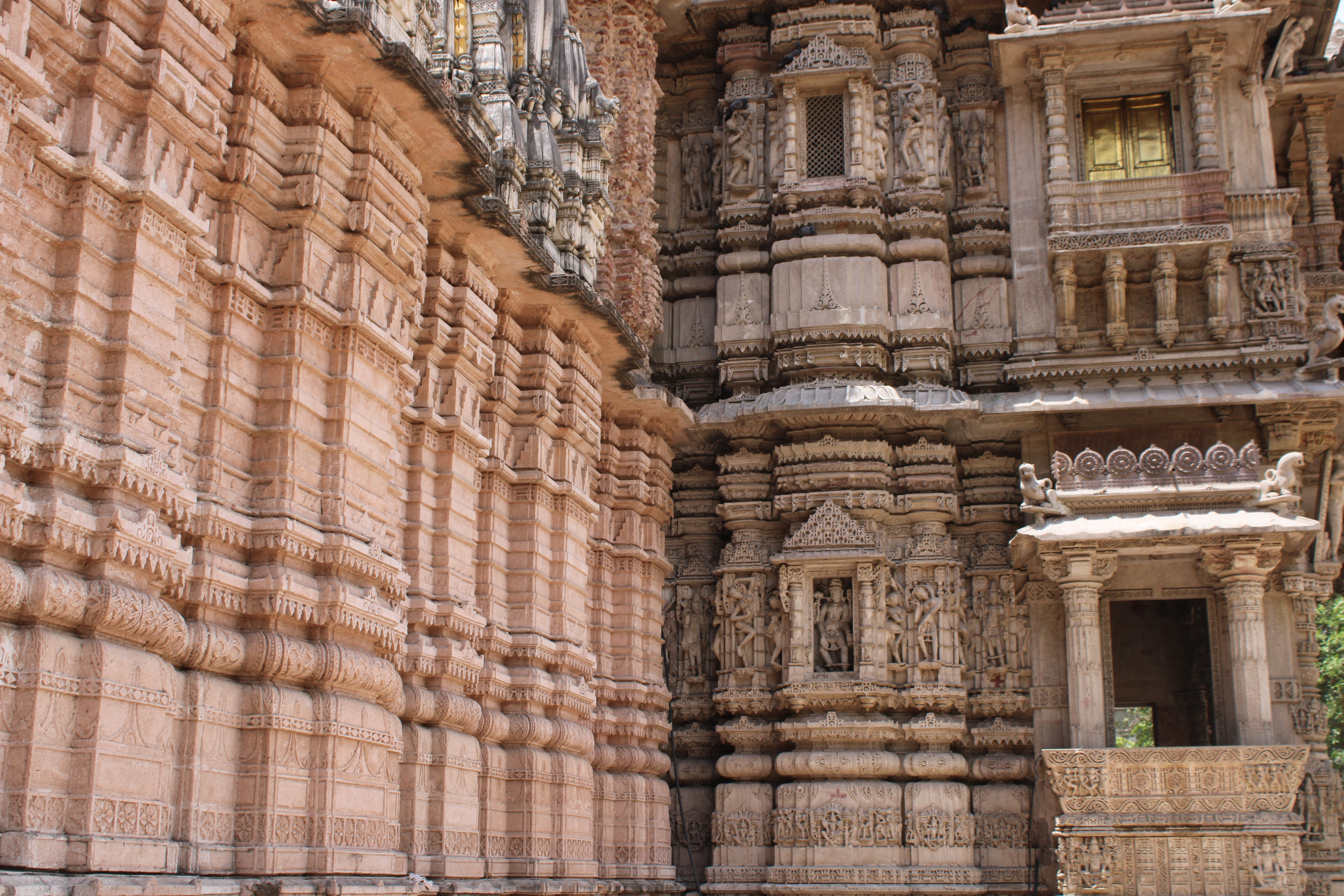
Detailed carving on the temple wall

Salat has blended the old temple architecture style with new architectural elements of haveli in designing the temple. It uses the Māru-Gurjara style, with many similarities to Bhadreshwar and Ranakpur. The temple is built from white marble.

The main gateway porch features architectural elements of wooden haveli including decorated walls, carved balustrades, overarching balconies, chabutras and jalis.

It is a nirandhara-prasada type of the temple which do not feature an ambulatory passage. The west-facing temple is built on a large platform. The principal temple has three sanctuaries in a row: a garbhagriha (sanctum), a gudhamandapa (closed shrine hall with porches), a vestibule and a sabhamandapa (assembly hall), each having its own shikhara. The principal temple is 52.5 metre high and double-stories. The garbhagriha on the east end has three ornate spires. The large ridged dome of the gudhamandapa is supported by twelve ornate pillars. The large protruding porches have ornate columns and brackets with figures on three outer sides. The temple is dedicated to Dharmanatha, the fifteenth Jain Tirthankara, whose marble image is housed in the central sanctum. The principal temple houses eleven deities, six in basement and five in three bay sanctuary. The porch and the outer mandapa each have three domes. There is a good deal of "sharply sculpted" decoration, "but figures appear only at the brackets".

The principal temple is surrounded by an open courtyard with a colonnaded cloister with 52 devakulikas (secondary shrines), each containing an image of a deity.

The temple is also known for rainwater harvesting structure.

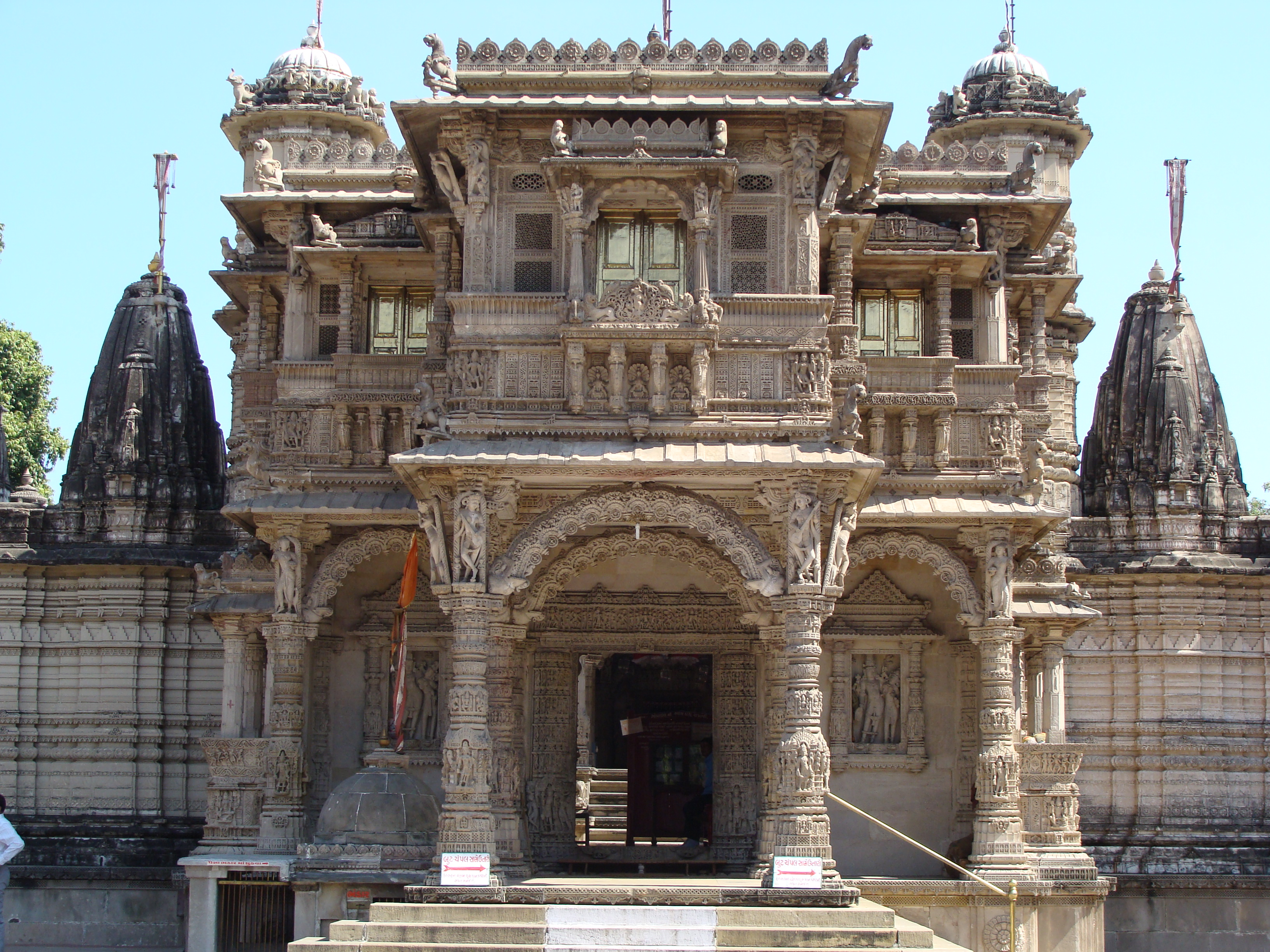
Front façade of the gateway porch

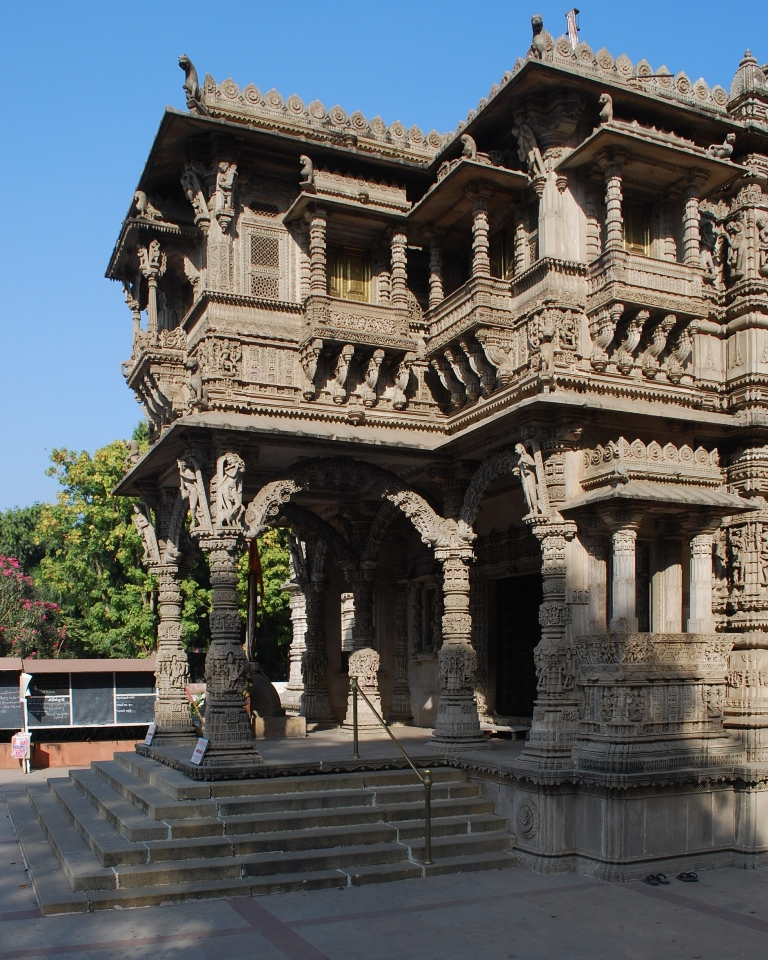
Decoration of the gateway porch

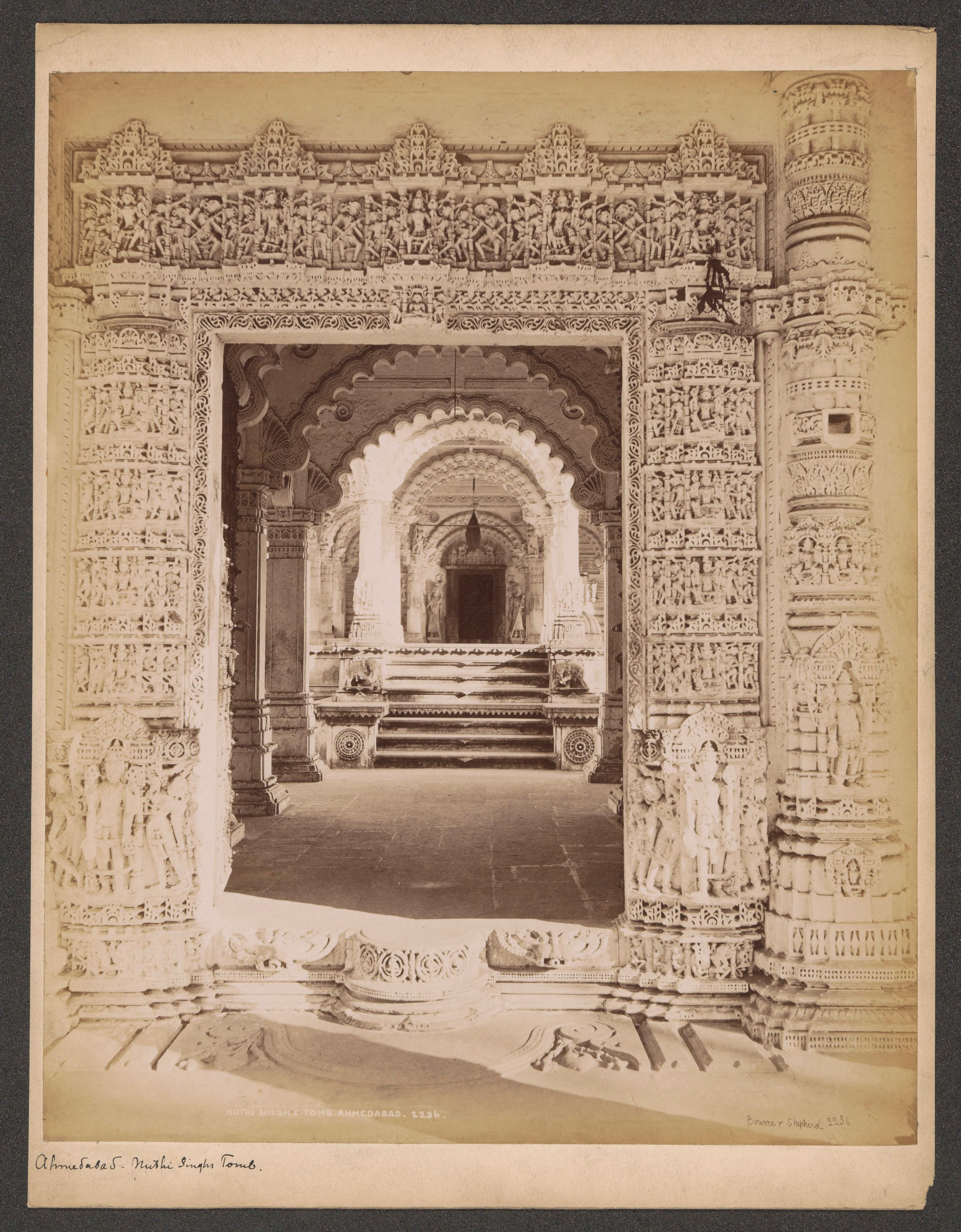
Ornamentation of the doorframe

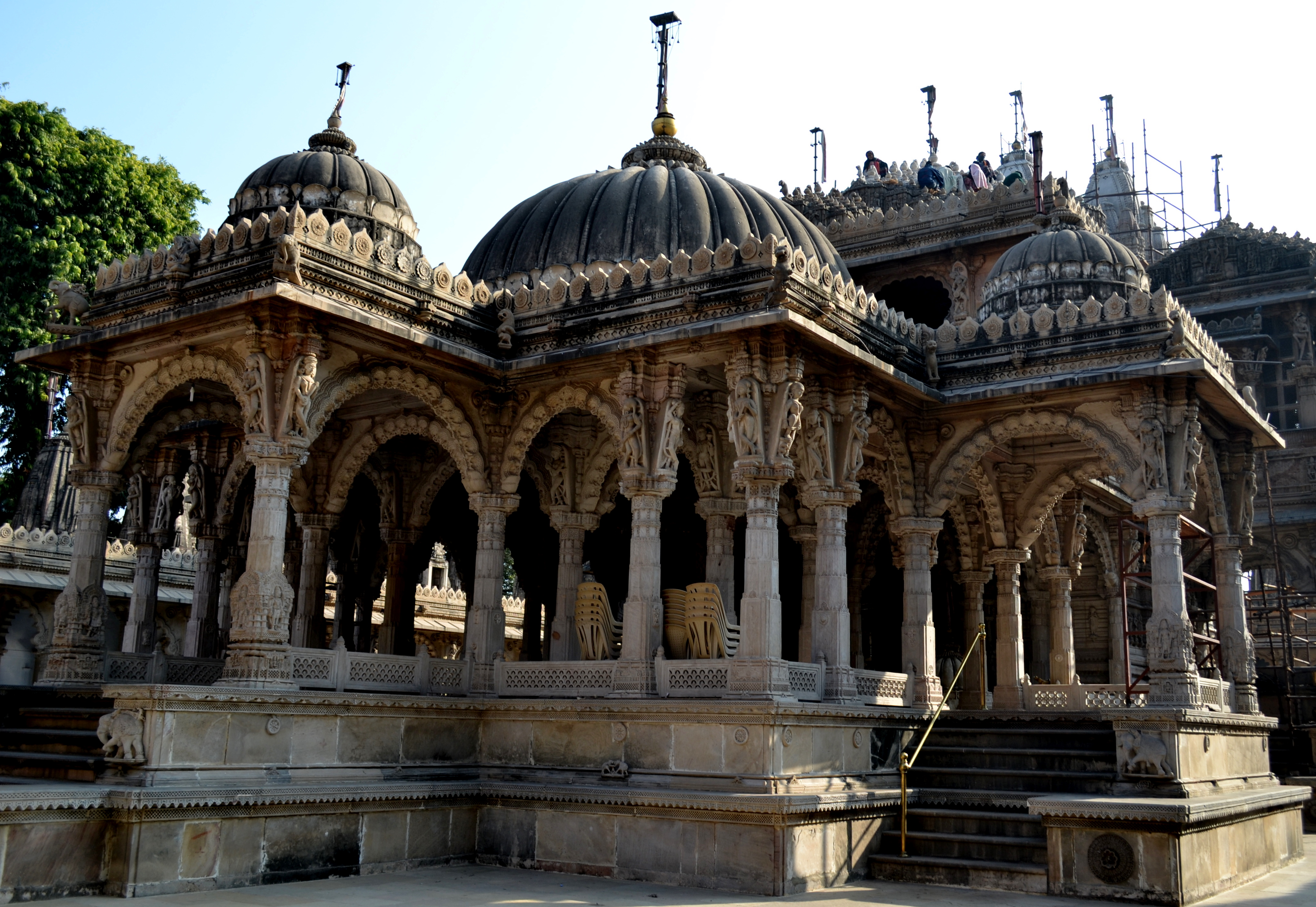
Three sanctuaries of the temple

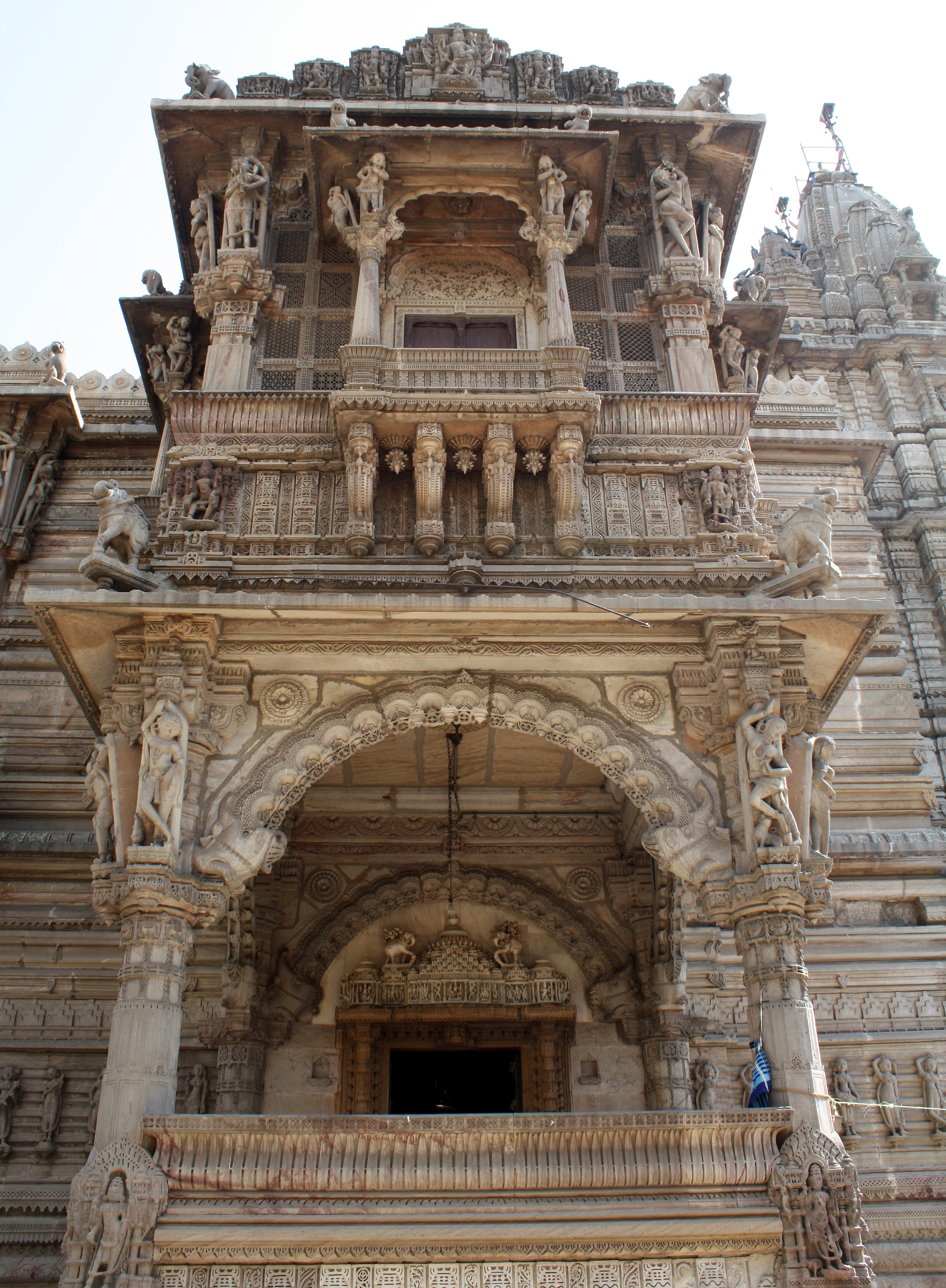
Decoration of the Gudhamandapa

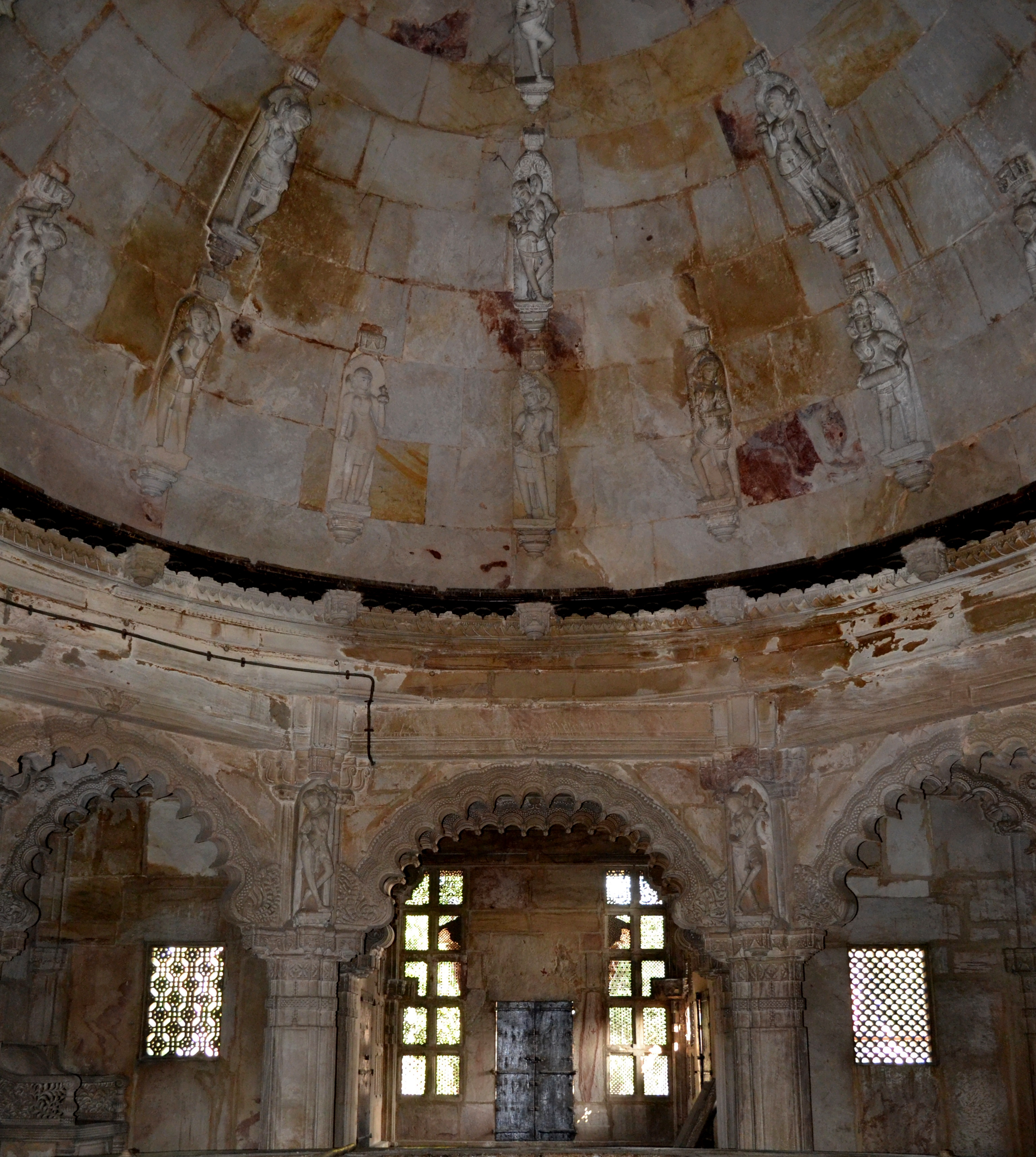
Ceiling

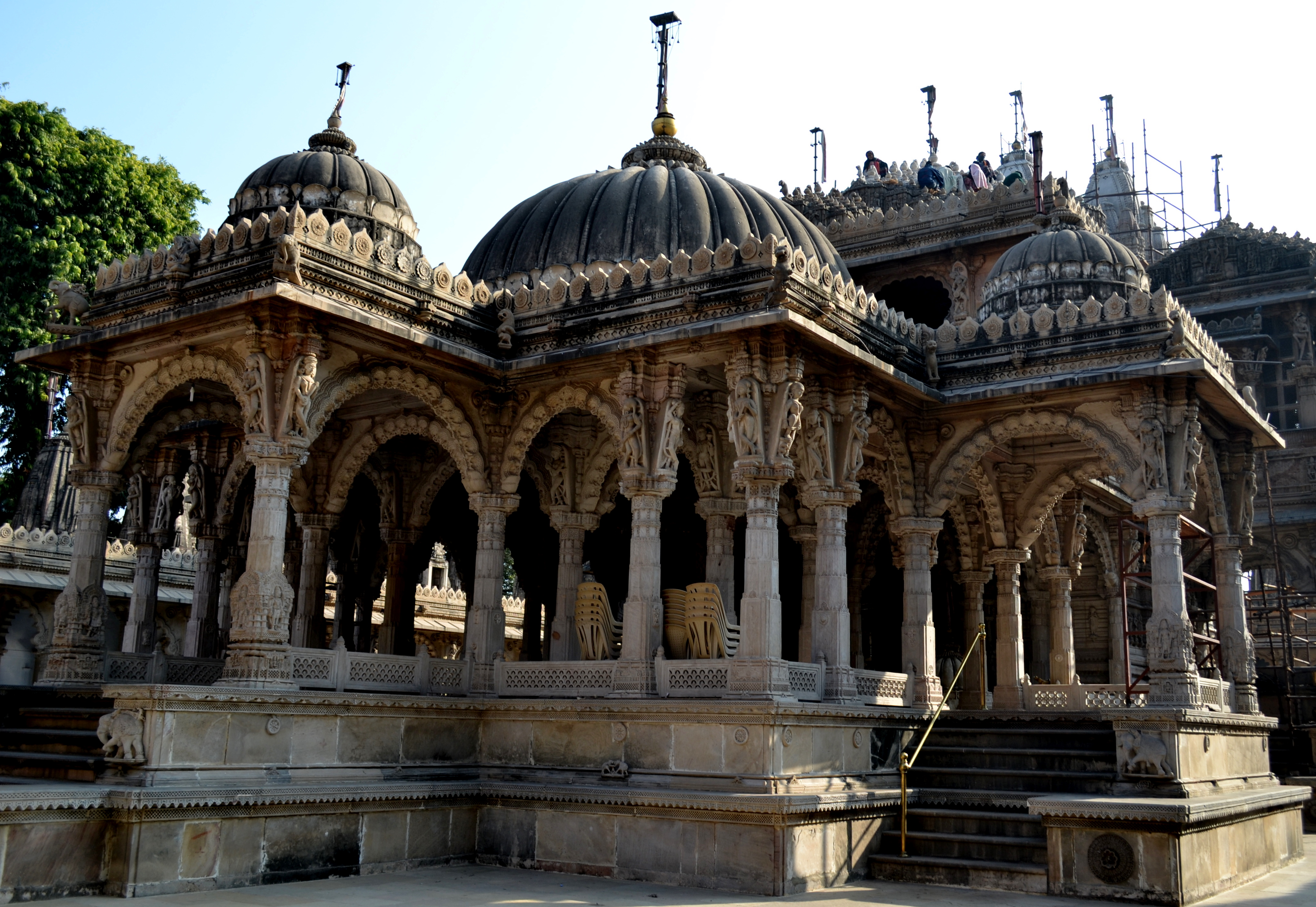
Sabhamandapa

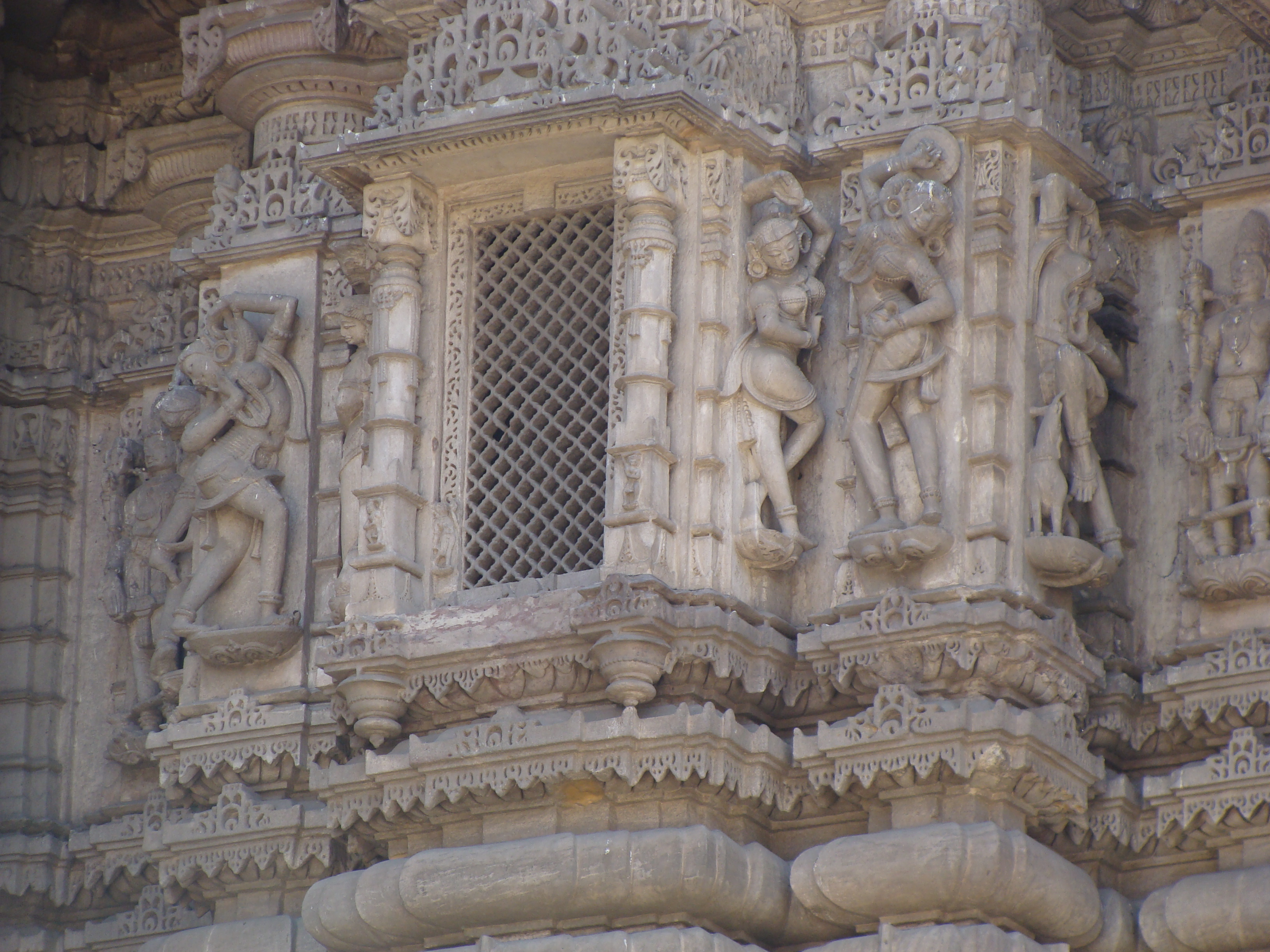
Carved exterior wall

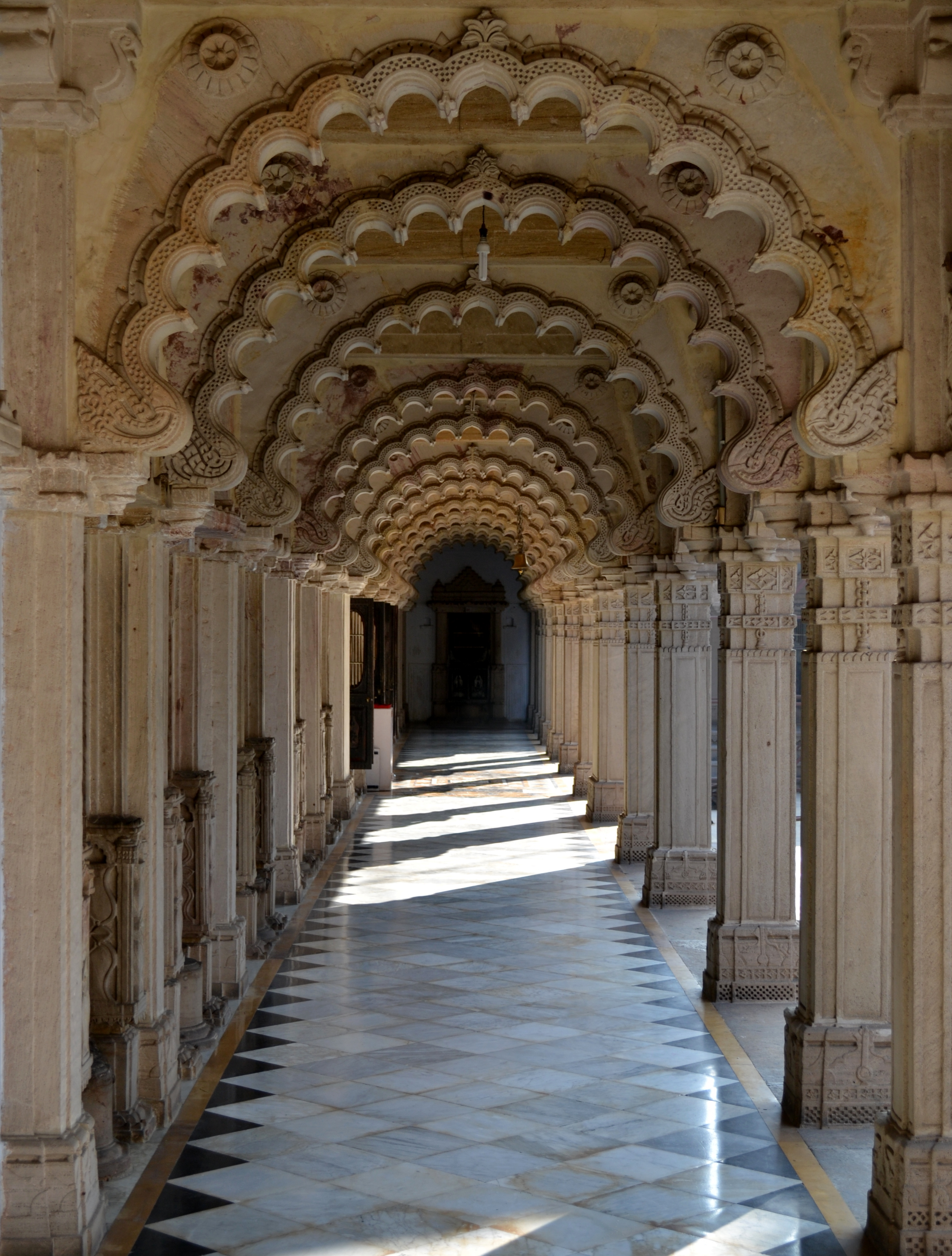
Colonnaded cloister

=== Manastambha ===
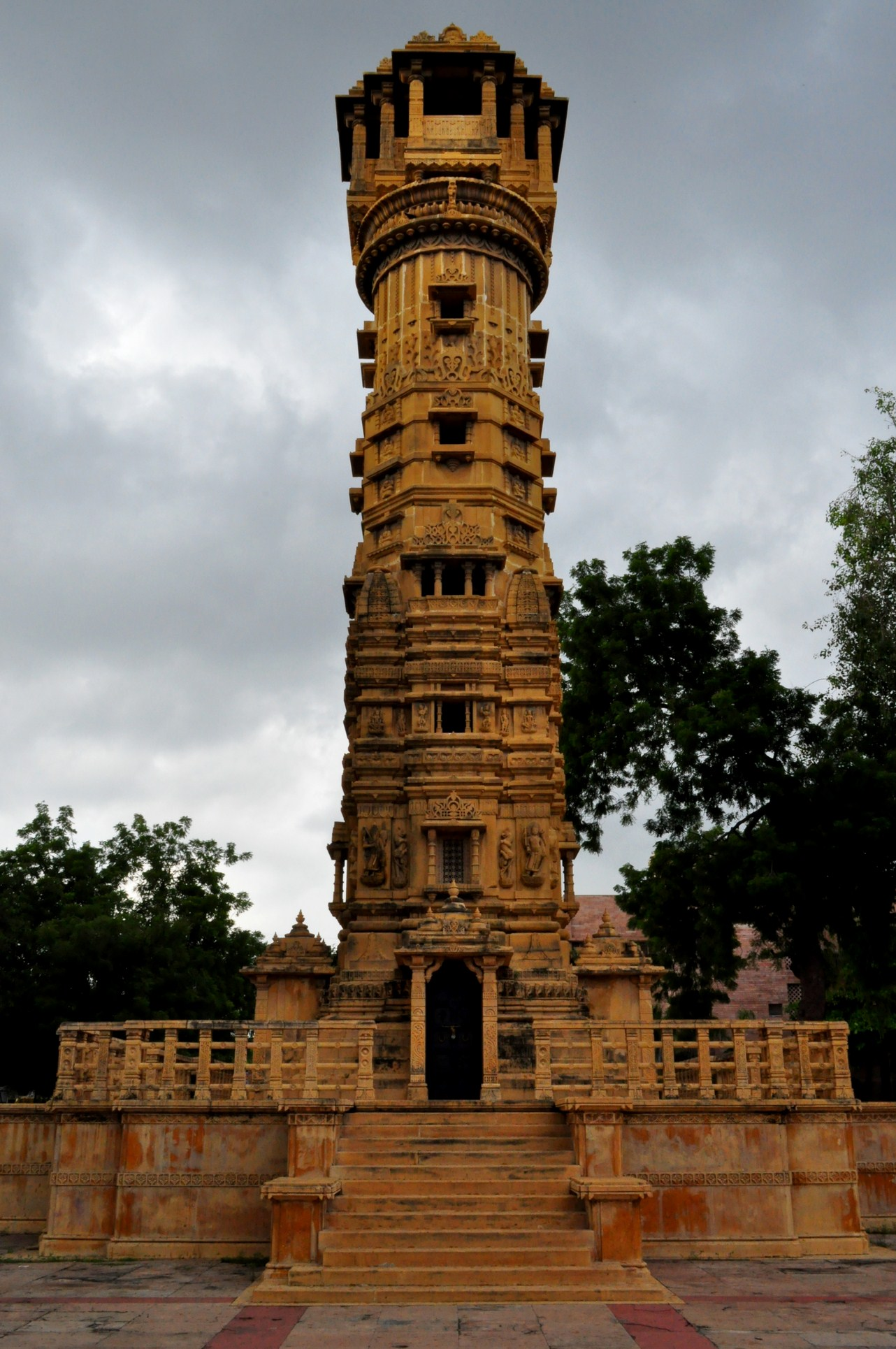
Manastambha

There is a 78 feet high Manastambha (or a column of honour) in its outer courtyard. It is inspired by the Kirti Stambha at Chittore in Rajasthan. It is six stories in height and enshrines an idol of Mahavira. It was built to commemorate the 2500th birth anniversary of Mahavira. Some of the motifs of the column are compared to the Sultanate minarets of the Mughal era.

== See also ==
- Hutheesing family
- Jainism in Gujarat
- List of Jain temples
