= Kirti Stambha =

12th-century tower at Chittor Fort in Chittorgarh, Rajasthan, India

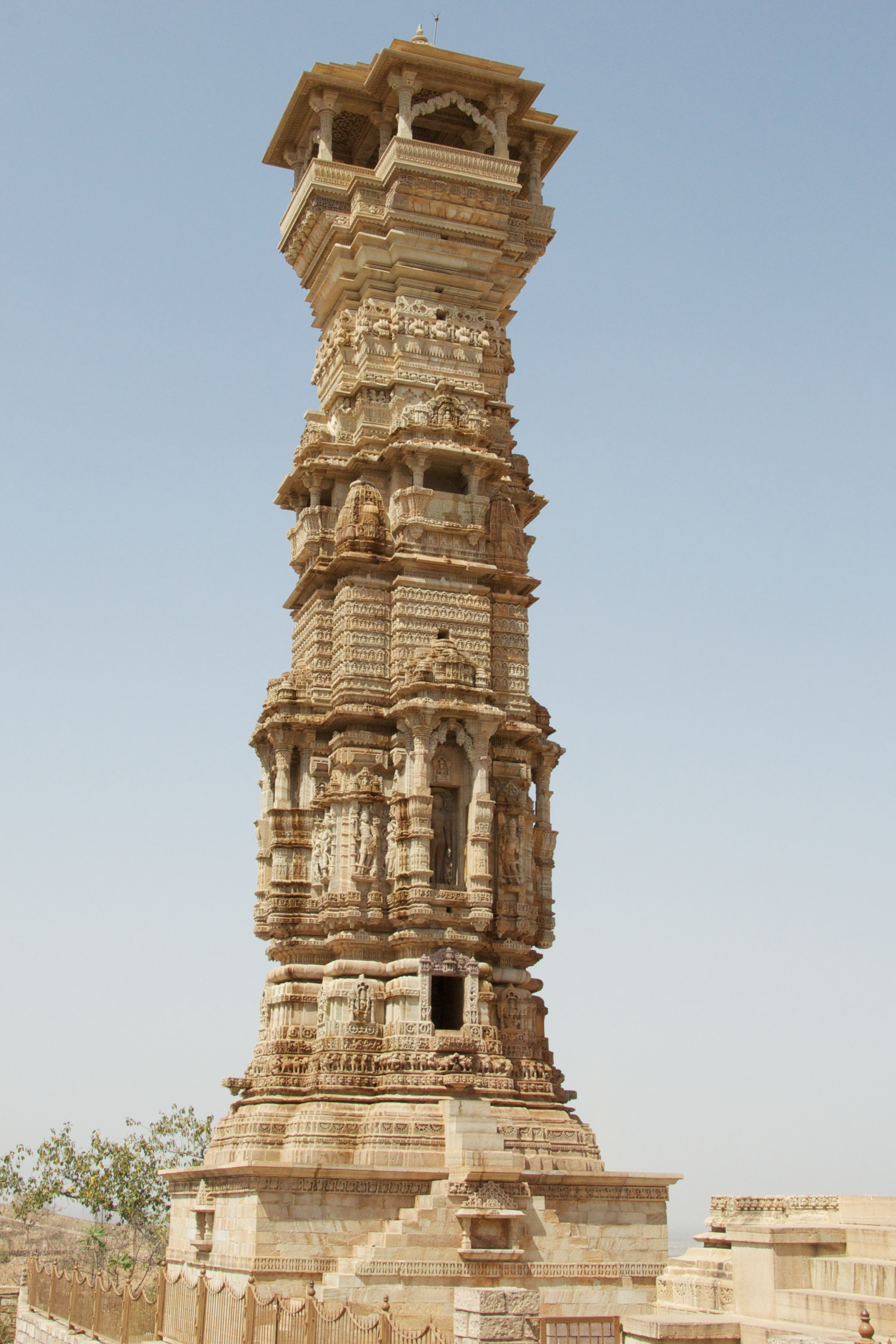
- Kirti Stambha

- Location within Rajasthan

Religion
- Affiliation: Jainism
- Sect: Digambara
- Deity: Rishabhanatha
- Festival: Mahavir Janma Kalyanak

Location
- Location: Chittor Fort, Chittorgarh, Rajasthan
- Interactive map of Kirti Stambha
- Coordinates: 24°53′32″N 74°39′0″E

Architecture
- Type: Tower
- Style: Māru-Gurjara architecture
- Creator: Jeeja Bhagerwala
- Established: 12th century CE

Kirti Stambha is a tower situated at Chittor Fort in Chittorgarh town of Rajasthan, India. It has been a major Jain center since at least the Kushana period, producing scholars such as Acharya Haribhadrasuri in the 6th century and Virasena in the 9th. Around 1179–1191 AD, the 22 m‑high Kirti Stambh was erected by merchant Jeeja Bhagerwala under Rawal Kumar Singh’s patronage, later serving as the seat of a Jain Bhattaraka until the 17th century. Built in the Solanki style, the seven‑storey tower stands on a 9 × 9 m plinth near the Saat‑Bees temple and originally housed life‑size images of Rishabhanatha in its sculpted niches. Inscriptions link the monument to the Bagherwal community and date its completion to the early 13th century, making it older than Vijay Stambh.

== History ==
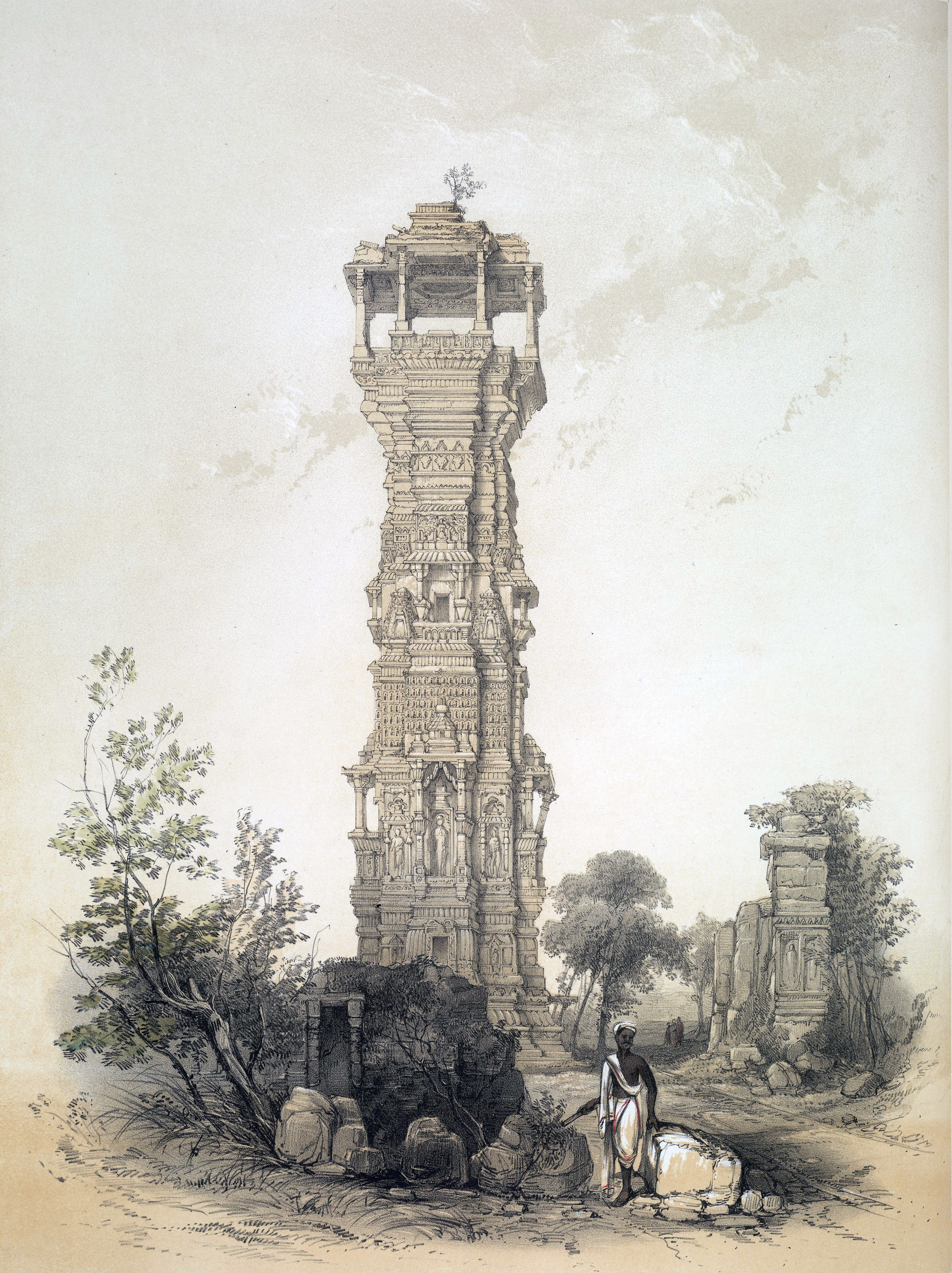
An 1847 drawing of the Kirti Stambha

Chittor has a history going back several centuries. It was an ancient centre of Jain tradition. Chittor is adjacent to the ancient city of Madhyamika. The Jain inscriptions at Mathura from the Kushana period (1st–3rd centuries CE) mention a "Majjhimilla" branch of the "Kottiya" gana, indicating that it was a major Jain centre. The famous Acharya Haribhadra Suri (6th century CE) was born in Chittor and wrote "Dhurtopakhyana" there.

There was a scholar Elacharya at Chittor from whom Vira-senacharya (9th century) learned the ancient Shat-khandagama and Kashayapahuda. Virasena later wrote the famous "Dhavala" and "Jayadhavala" on the basis of these books.

The 22 metres (72 ft) tower was built by a Jain merchant Jeeja Bhagerwala during the reign of Rawal Kumar Singh in c. 1179–1191 CE. It was the residence of Jinavallabha who propagated the Vidhimarga in the 12th century. From the 15th to 17th centuries, it was the seat of a Bhattaraka.

Three inscriptions have been found that mention Jija of Bagherwal community as the builder of the stambha. One of the inscriptions mention Dharmakirti, the disciple of Shubhakirti, who was disciple of Vasantkirti. According to the Balatkara Gana Pattavali, Dharmakirti headed the patta during 1224-1257 CE. Thus the structure dates from the 13th century, although an unrelated Jain inscription of 896 CE was found in the vicinity. Kirti Stambha is older than another tower in the same fort, known as the Vijay Stambha (Tower of Victory).

== Architecture ==
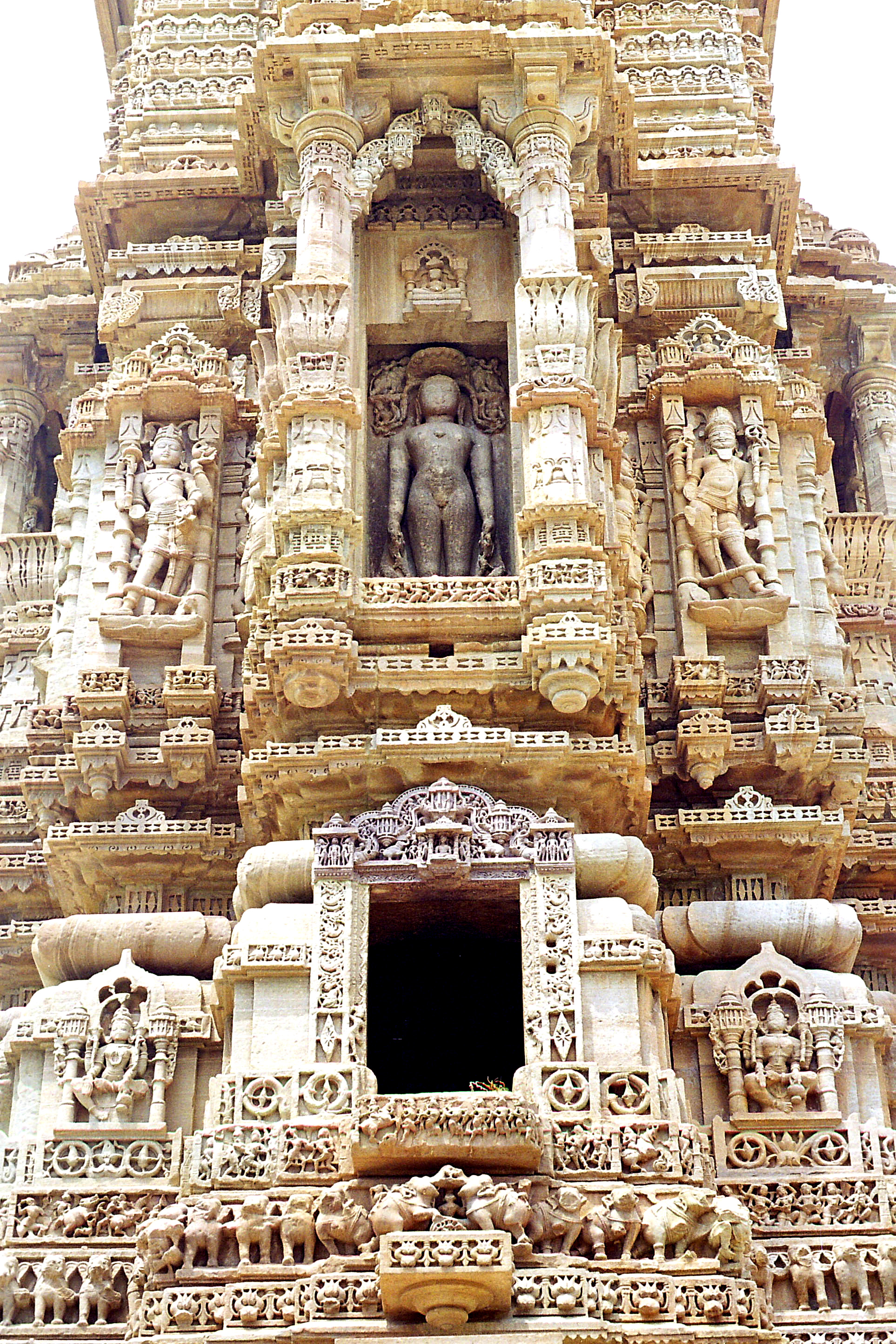
Kirti Stambh

The Kirti Stambh was built in the Solanki style. It rises in seven distinct storeys to a total height of approximately 22.5 m above its 9 m by 9 m square plinth. The tower stands near the Saat-Bees Jain temple. Its ground level, known as the Hansh Peeth, along with Sinha-mukh Thar, Gaja Thar and Nava Thar, originally housing life‑size images of Rishabhanatha. It is dedicated to Rishabha, the first Tirthankara of Jainism.

== Gallery ==
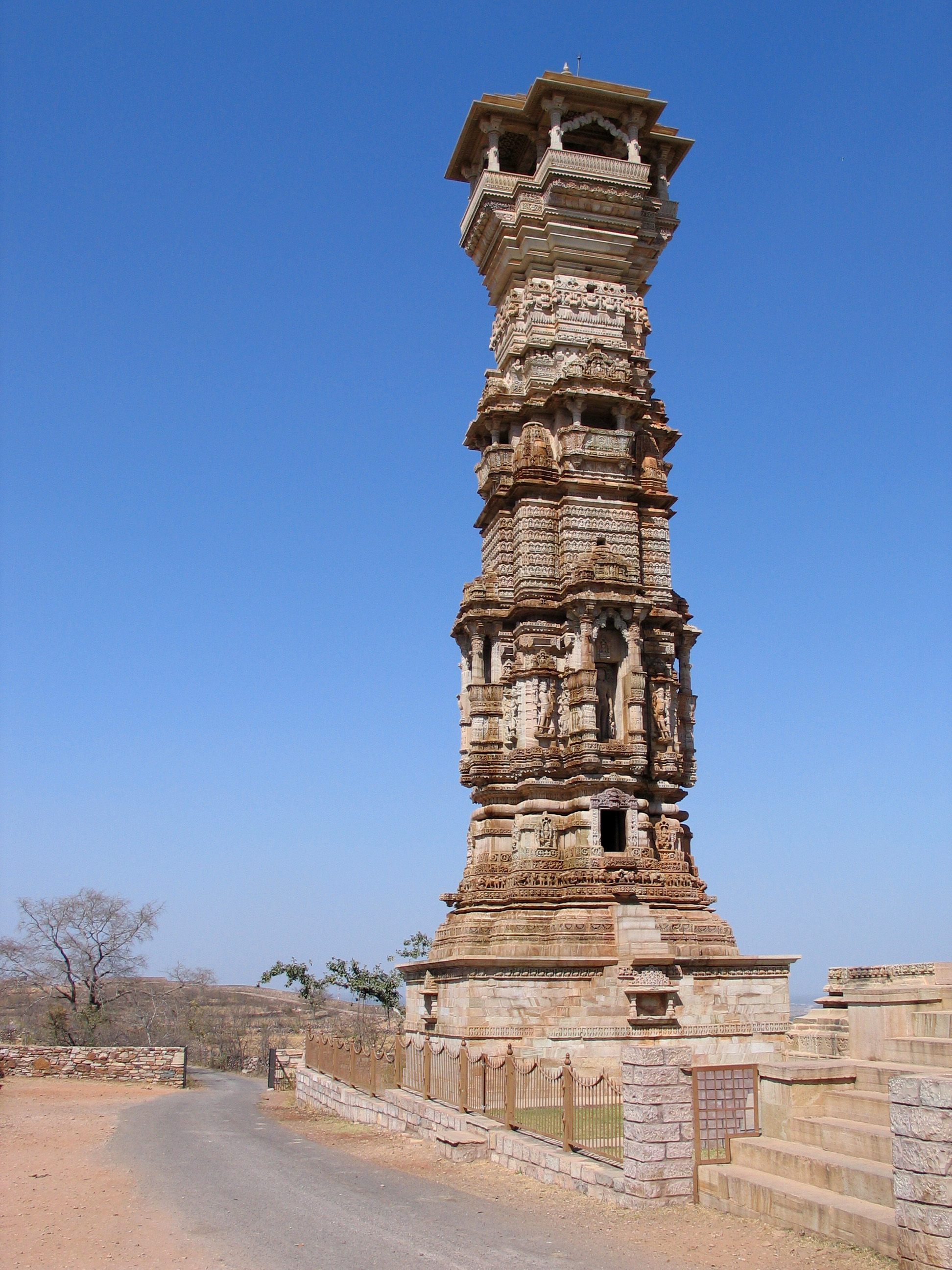
A recent photo of the tower standing tall in Chittor

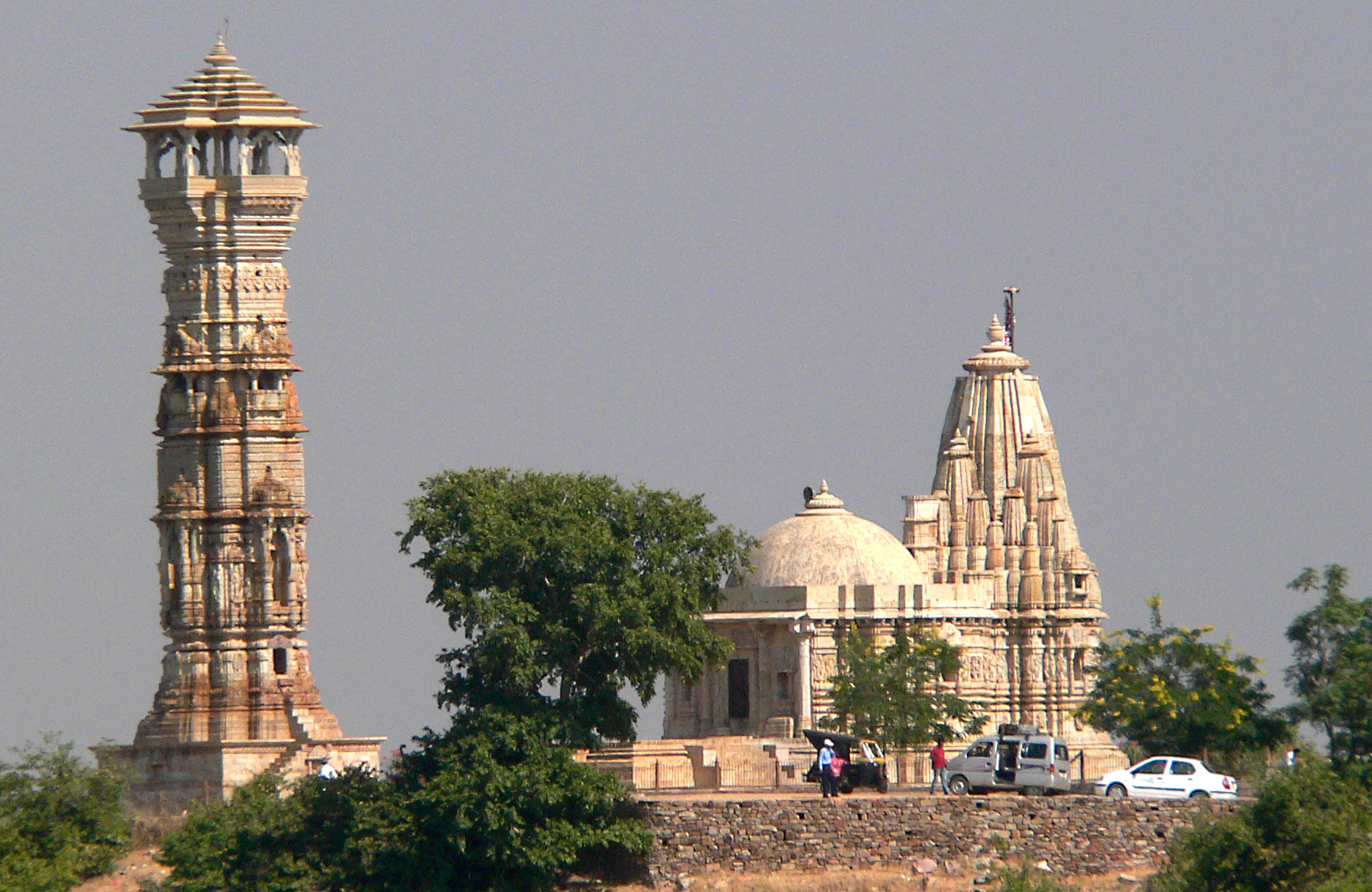
Mahavir temple with Kirti Stambha

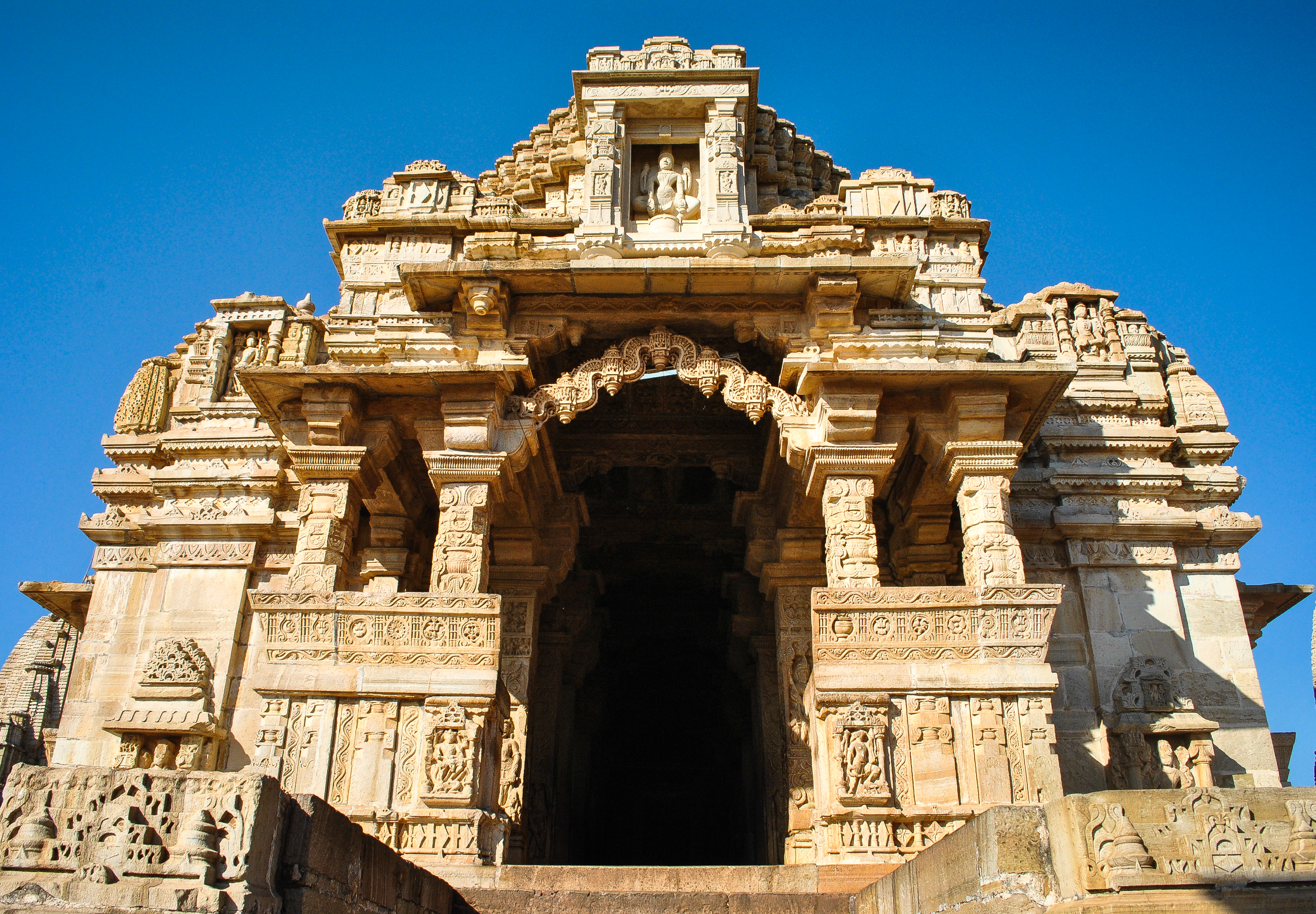
Mahavir Jain temple

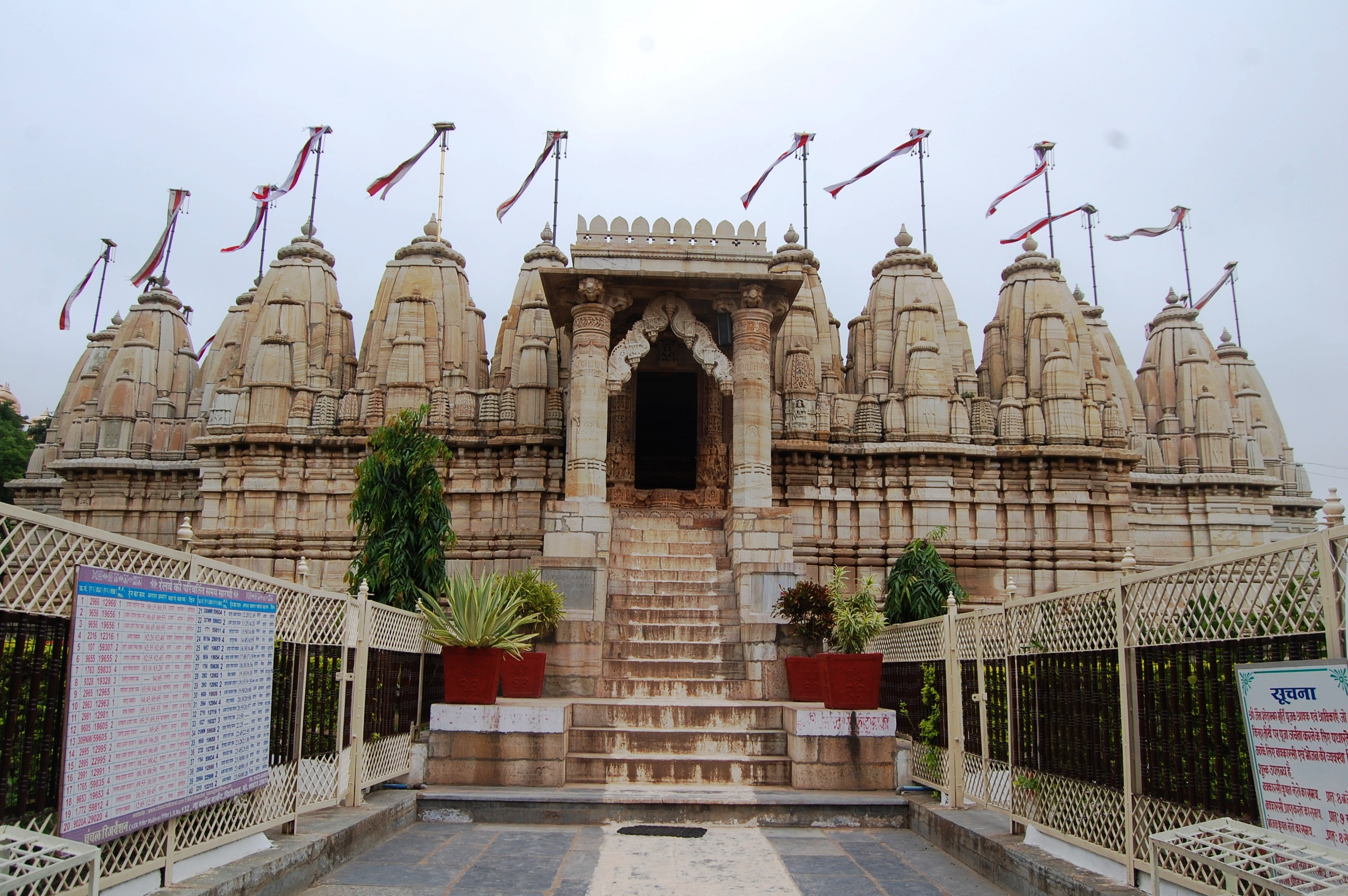
Saat-Bees Jain temple near Kirti Stampla

== See also ==
- Stambha
- Vijay Stambha
- Manastambha
- Chittor Fort
