= List of Jain inscriptions =

The following is a list of Jain inscriptions.

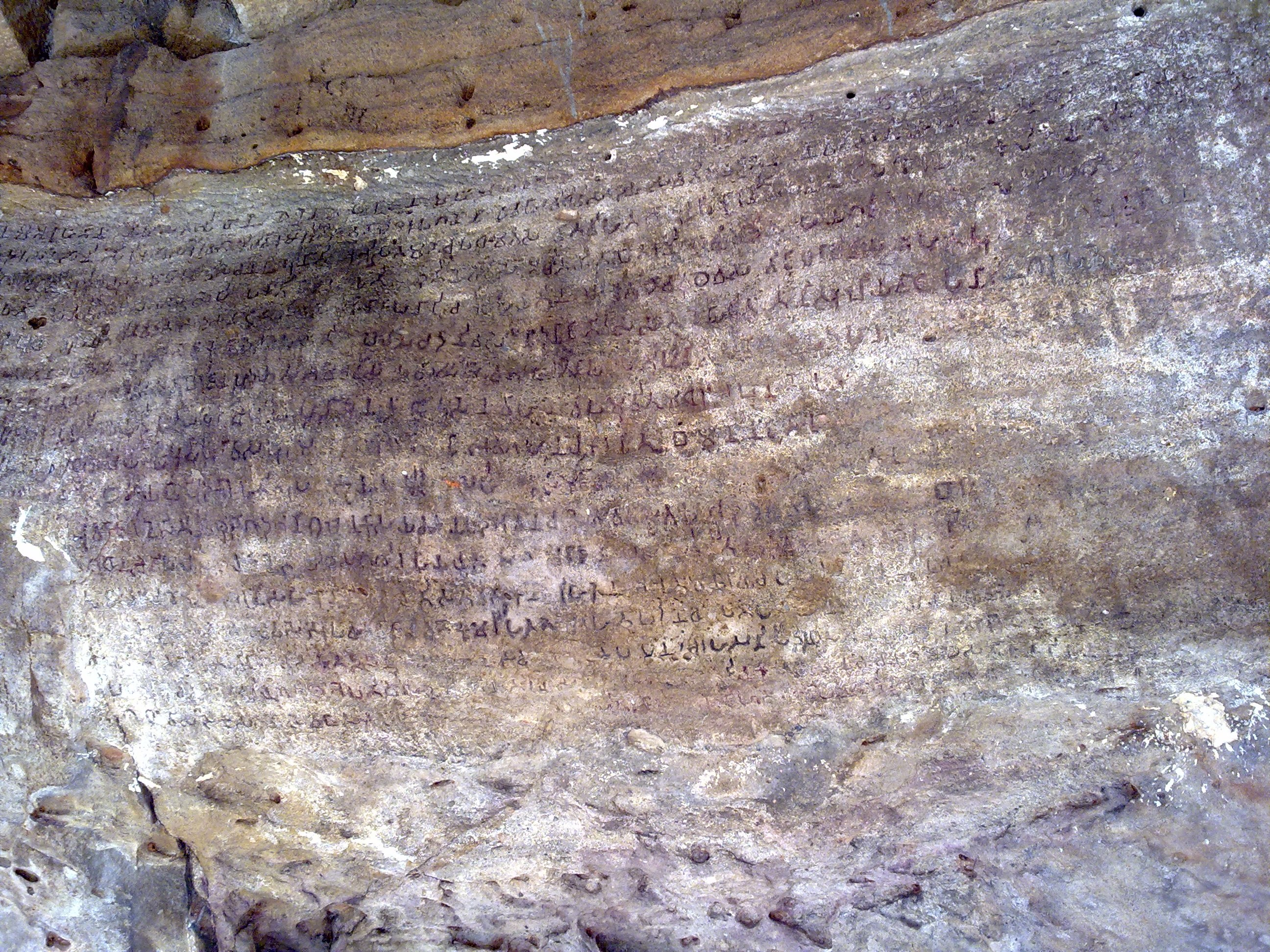
Inscriptions at a Udaygiri-Khandagiri 2nd-1st-century BCE Jain rock cut cave, Odisha.

| Location | Period | Citation |
|---|---|---|
| Barli inscription | 443 BCE | |
| Mangulam inscription | 3rd century BCE | |
| Pugalur inscription | 2nd century BCE | |
| Hathigumpha inscription | 2nd century BCE | |
| Arachalur | 2nd-century CE | |
| Inscriptions in Kankali Tila | 2nd century BCE — 2nd century CE | |
| Kahaum Pillar Inscription | 460-461 CE | |
| Akota Bronzes Inscriptions | 5th — 12th century CE | |
| Aihole inscription | 7th century CE | |
| Seeyamangalam Jain inscription | 892-93 CE | |
| Bijolia Jain inscription | 1170 CE | |
