= Á Bao A Qu =

Creature in Borges's Book of Imaginary Beings

A Bao A Qu is a legendary Malay creature described in Jorge Luis Borges's 1967 Book of Imaginary Beings. Borges claimed to have found it either in an introduction to the Arabian Nights by Richard Francis Burton, or in the book On Malay Witchcraft (1937) by C.C. Iturvuru. The Burton reference was given in the original Spanish, but it was changed to the Iturvuru reference in the English text, possibly to make it sound more exotic, or as a reference to Borges' friend C. C. Iturburu. The writer Antares conjectures that Borges's tale might be inspired by Orang Asli myth, and that "A Bao A Qu" is a slurring of abang aku meaning "my elder brother".

In Borges's story, the A Bao A Qu lives on the steps of the Tower of Victory in Chitor, from the top of which one can see "the loveliest landscape in the world". The A Bao A Qu waits on the first step for a man brave enough to try to climb up. Until that point, it lies sleeping, shapeless and translucent, until someone passes. Then, when a man starts climbing, the creature wakes, and follows close behind. As it progresses further and further up, it begins to become clearer and more colorful. It gives off a blue light which increases as it ascends. But it only reaches perfection when the climber reaches the top, and achieves Nirvana, so his acts don't cast any shadows. But almost all the time, the climber cannot reach the top, for they are not perfect. When the A Bao A Qu realizes this, it hangs back, losing color and visibility, and tumbles back down the staircase until it reaches the bottom, once more dormant and shapeless. In doing so, it gives a small cry, so soft that it sounds similar to the rustling of silk. When touched, it feels like the fuzz on the skin of a peach. Only once in its everlasting life has the A Bao A Qu reached its destination at the top of the tower.

== Mentions to Á Bao A Qu ==
Mentions and references to the creature can be found in the following works:

- A Baoa Qu, an asteroid fortress in the anime Mobile Suit Gundam.
- A Bao A Qu, album from Virginia Astley (1982).
- A theater play from Peruvian-Brazilian actor Enrique Diaz.
- Part of the legend is narrated in the movie The Old Place from Jean-Luc Godard and Anne-Marie Miéville.
- A Bao A Qu, an EP from the Japanese band Boris (2005).
- A creature in the manga MÄR (2003–2006).
- A Bao A Qu, the Lightless Shadow, a monster from the cardgame Yu-Gi-Oh!
- A Bao A Qu is an enemy monster in La-Mulana which is virtually invisible, and "attacks the hesitant".
