= Vijaya Stambha =

Victory monument within Chittor Fort in Chittorgarh, Rajasthan, India

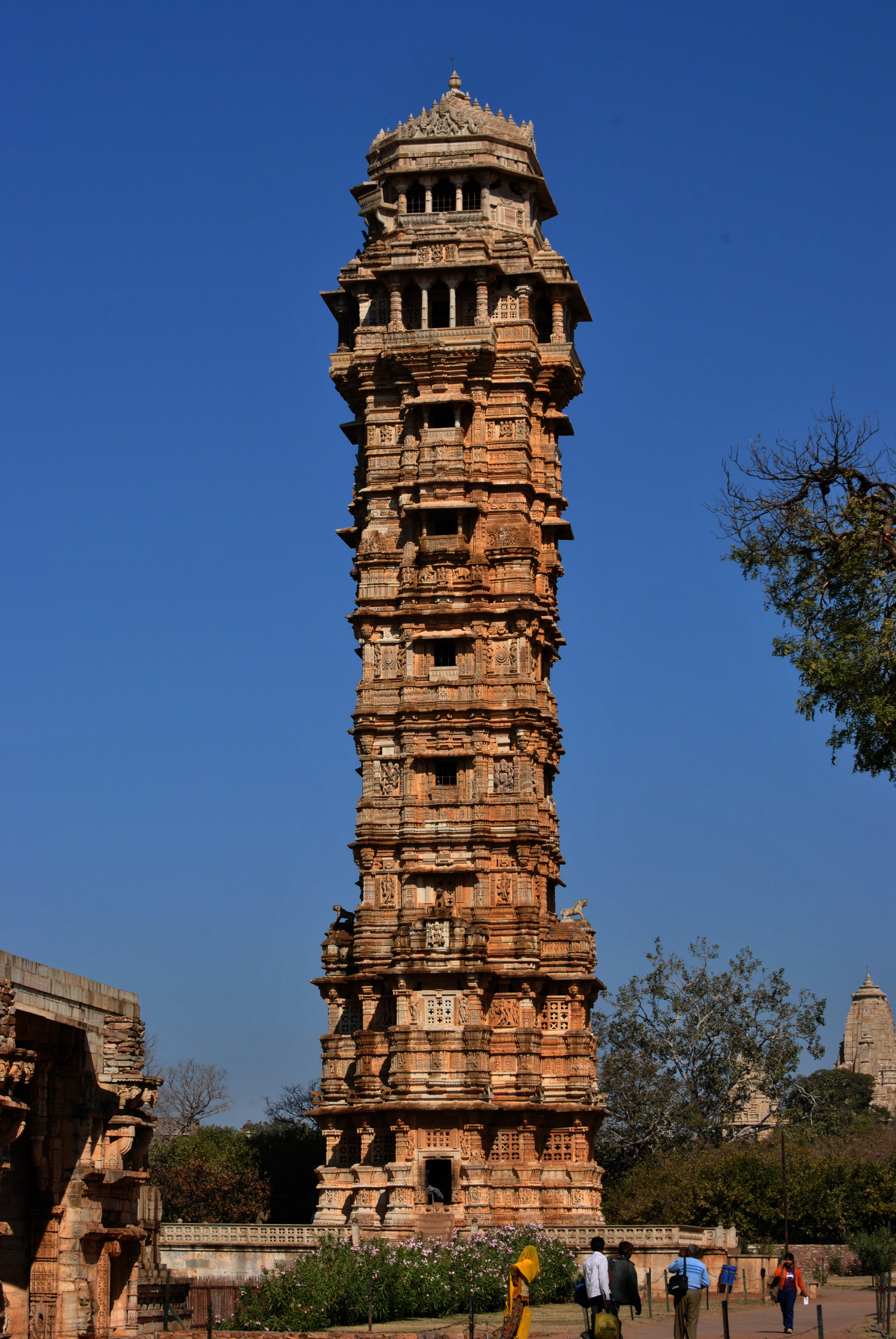
- Vijaya Stambha (Tower of Victory)

- Location within India Location within Rajasthan
- Alternative names: Victory Tower

General information
- Type: Tower
- Location: Chittorgarh, Rajasthan, India
- Coordinates: 24.887870°N 74.645157°E
- Completed: 1448 CE

Height
- Height: 37.19 m (122 ft)

Technical details
- Floor count: 9

Design and construction
- Architect: Sutradhar Jaita

The Vijaya Stambha is a Rajput victory monument located within Chittor Fort in Chittorgarh, Rajasthan, India. The tower was constructed by the Hindu Rajput king Rana Kumbha of Mewar in 1448 CE to commemorate his victory over the army of Sultanate of Malwa led by Mahmud Khilji in the Battle of Sarangpur. The tower is dedicated to Hindu God Vishnu. Colonel James Todd considered it one of the finest examples of Hindu Rajput architecture and superior to Qutub Minar.

== Inscriptions ==
To commemorate this great victory, Rana Kumbha built the great Vijay Stambha (Tower of Victory) in the fortress of Chittor. However, before this tower could be completed, the Rana had to face and vanquish the combination of two most powerful kingdoms in India at the time, those of Gujarat and Malwa, these glorious events are inscribed on the celebrated tower. Sultan Mahmud Khilji remained a prisoner in Chittor for a period of six months, after which he was liberated with ransom by Rana Kumbha. The inscribed slabs in the uppermost storey containing a detailed genealogy of the rulers of Chittaur and their deeds is ascribed to Rana Kumbha court scholar, Atri and his son Mahesh. The names of the architect, Sutradhar Jaita and his three sons who assisted him, Napa, Puja, and Poma, are carved on the fifth floor of the tower.

The Vijaya Stambha is a remarkable example of religious pluralism practised by the Rajputs. The topmost story features an image of the Jain Goddess, Padmavati.

== Architecture and Design ==
The Vijay Stambha's column is one hundred and twenty feet in height; the breadth of each face at the base is thirty-five feet, and at the summit, immediately under the cupola, seventeen feet and a half. It stands on an ample terrace, forty - two feet square. It has 9 distinct storeys, with openings at every face of each storey, and all these doors have colonnaded porticos.

== Commemorative Postal Stamps ==
Commemorative stamps released by India Post

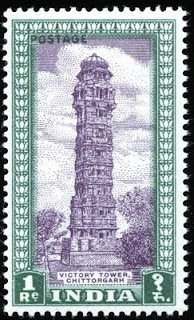
1949 postal stamp

== See also ==
- Kirti Stambha
- Victory column
- Á Bao A Qu
