= Mori Kingdom =

Indian kingdom

- 610s–734
- The Moris and neighbouring South Asian polities circa 600 CE
- Capital: Chittorgarh Fort, Rajasthan, India; 24.8863°N 74.647°E
- Religion: State religion: Hinduism
- History
  - Established: 610s
  - Disestablished: 734
Preceded by	Succeeded by
Aulikaras	Guhila dynasty

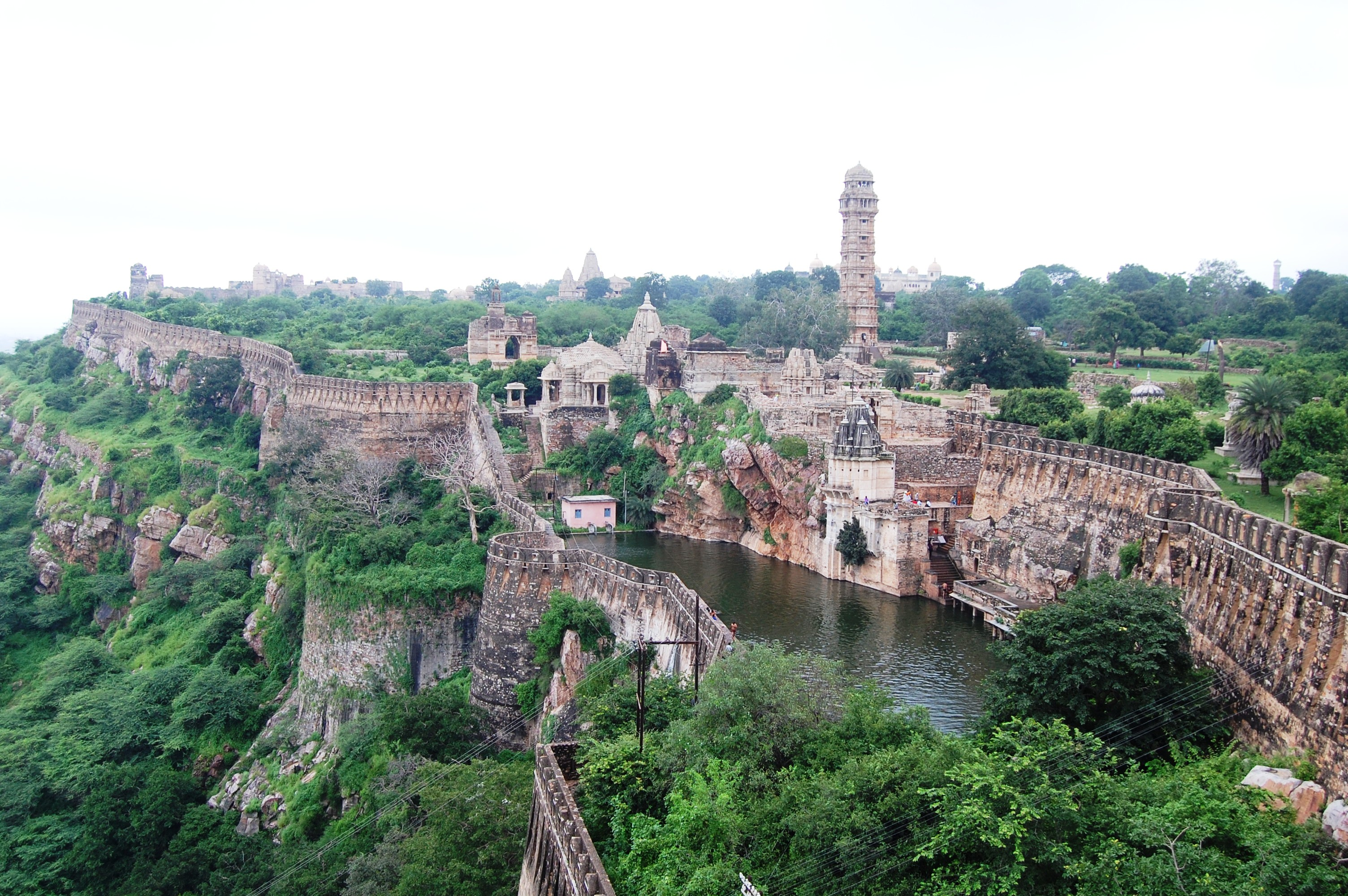
A view of Chittorgarh Fort, Rajasthan, India

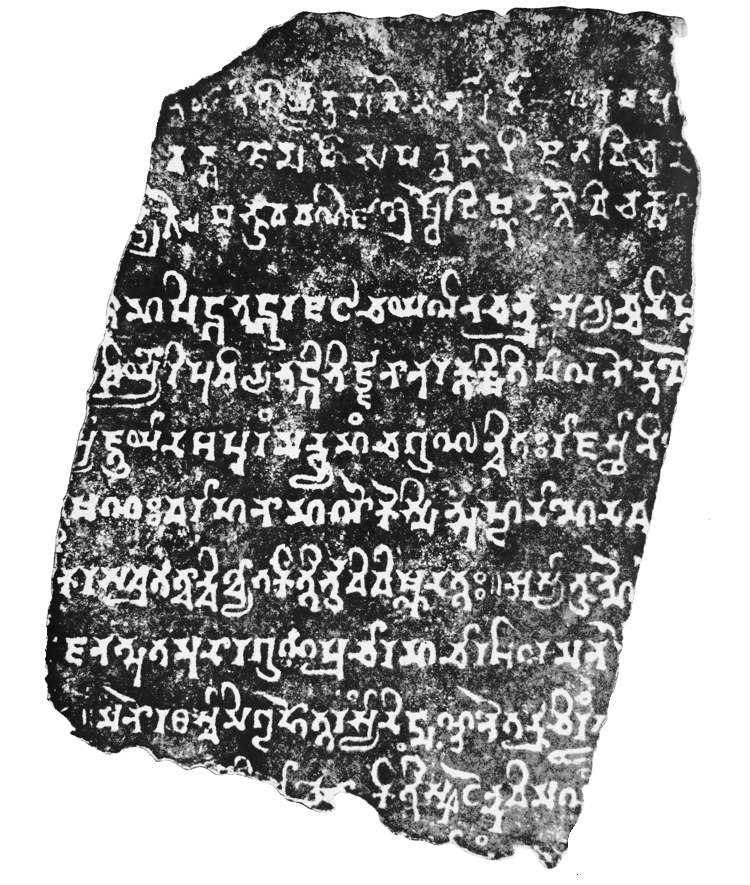
Chittorgarh fragmentary inscriptions of the Naigamas, first half of the 6th century CE.

The Mori Kingdom, also known as the Later Mauryas, (Note: To distinguish them from the unrelated Maurya Empire.) was a kingdom that ruled over southwestern Rajasthan and northern Malwa in India. The kingdom was established in the 7th century, and reigned for a period of about 120 years. The Moris controlled the Chittor Fort, and were a powerful military regime in this region before the rise of the Gurjara-Pratihara dynasty.

== History ==
The Moris are mentioned as one of the branches of the Parmar Rajput clan by some scholars. Chitrangada Mori, a Mori Rajput ruler, laid the foundation of the fort of Chittorgarh (also known as Chittor Fort).

The Mori people controlled the Chittor Fort and the surrounding region before the Guhila dynasty took control. The fort of Chittor became a well-established citadel in the 8th century under the Moris. An inscription in the fortress (dated 713 CE) names four Mori Rajput rulers of Chittor.

Bappa Rawal probably led the Mori campaign against the Arabs, which, among other factors, contributed to his historical prominence. Later, he either deposed his overlord, Manuraja of the Chittor (also known as Mana Mori), and became king with the help of the nobles, or he became the king after Manuraja died childless. Following Bappa Rawal's rise to power, the Moris were expelled from Chittorgarh.

=== Defeat by the Arabs ===
According to C.K. Majumdar, the Moris were ruling at Chittor when the Arabs (mlechchhas) invaded north-western India, around 725 CE. The Arabs defeated the Moris, and in turn, were defeated by a confederacy that included Bappa Rawal.

=== Decline of Mori Kingdom ===
Bappa Rawal defeated King Mana Mori, his maternal grandfather, and captured the kingdom of Chittor. This event is mentioned in the Rajprashasti Abhilekh, in the epic Mahakavya, in Canto 3.

Instead of counting Bappa Rawal as the last king of the Mori Dynasty of Chittor, some sources provide a different order of events and count Mana Mori as the final king. Muhammad bin Qasim who was an Arab military commander in service of the Umayyad Caliphate, attacked Chittor via Mathura in 725 CE. Bappa Rawal, of Guhila dynasty, was a commander in the Mori army. After defeating Bin Qasim, Bappa Rawal obtained Chittor in dowry from Mana Mori in 734 CE. From then on, Chittor was ruled by the Sisodia Rajputs. Still, descendants of Chitrangada Mori are said to survive in the Malwa region of India.

== Inscriptions ==
The Dabok stone inscription, dating back to Gupta Samvat 407 (725 CE), records events during the reign of Dhavalappadeva. This ruler is likely the same as Dhavala, a prince from the Maurya dynasty mentioned in the Kansuvam inscription of Vikrama Samvat 795 (738 CE). Mana Mori ruled Chittor until at least 736 AD as per the Kansuvam inscription. It is known that Bappa captured the fort from Mana Mori, not from Dhavala Mori. The Kanswa inscription describes Dhavala as follows:

(L.5)- The rulers (born) in this Mauryan race, like the elephants of the quarters, filling the noble with joy by (their) faces bright with generosity (as with rutting-juice) together with their adherents confidently take delight everywhere, undaunted of mind (and) exulting in (their) pride, of known renown on account of (their) good lineage (and) known for (their) virtues, praiseworthy for probity and full of energy.
(L.6)- Among these kings, who were such (and) who ruled the whole earth, there was a prince who, Dhavala as he was, was dazzling by (his) fame. For their own sins, which day by day they always openly brought on themselves by their bodies and so forth, he defeated (his) enemies and reduced the wretches to such a state that, like evil spirits, naked (and) ever famishing (and thus) day by day revealing the punishment (meted out to them, and) again and again wandering at night to strangers' houses, they even now are kings.
—Kanswa Inscription of Dhavala Mori

Manuraja is identified with Māna, mentioned in the Chittorgarh Māna-sarovara inscription of 713 AD. Māna was described as the son of Bhoja. Māna's great - grandfather was named Maheśvara.

== See also ==
- List of Indian monarchs
- Chitrangada Mori
- Bappa Rawal

== Bibliography ==
- Khalid Yahya Blankinship (1994). The End of the Jihad State: The Reign of Hisham Ibn 'Abd al-Malik and the Collapse of the Umayyads. SUNY Press. p. 188. ISBN 978-0-7914-1827-7.
- Ram Vallabh Somani (1976). History of Mewar, from Earliest Times to 1751 A.D. Mateshwari. OCLC 2929852.
- R. C. Majumdar (1977). Ancient India. Motilal Banarsidass. ISBN 9788120804364.
- Shyam Manohar Mishra (1977). Yaśovarman of Kanauj. Abhinav. OCLC 557679616.
