= Kumbha Shyam Temple, Chittorgarh =

Temple

Kumbha Shyam Temple Chittorgarh was constructed by Maharana Sangram Singh I, the ruler of Mewar (1482–1528), on the special request of Mirabai, his daughter-in-law. It was used as a private worship place to chant the name of Krishna by his devotee Mirabai.The grand structure of the temple, with a pyramidal tower, high roofs, and archways, is installed with idols of many Hindu gods and goddesses.

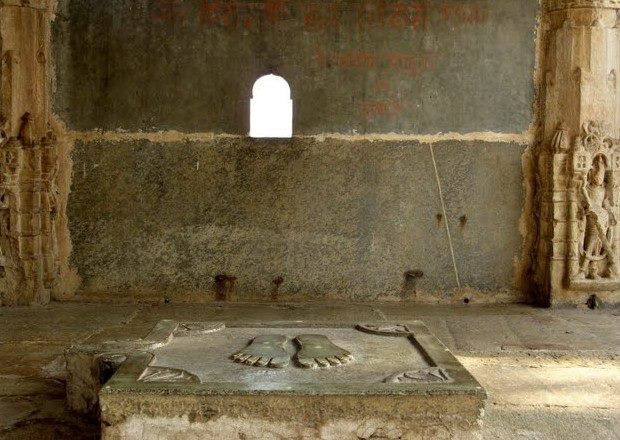
Engraved footprints of Guru Ravidass at Kumbha Shyam Temple, Chittorgarh

In the vicinity of Kumbha Shyama Temple, there is a chhatri constructed in memory of Meera Bai's guru named Ravidass. This chattri, located opposite the main temple, preserves the impression of Guru Ravidass's footprints.

== See also ==
- Chittor Fort
- Ravidas
