= Chittor Fort =

Historic fort in Rajasthan, India

- Part of Chittorgarh
- Rajasthan, India
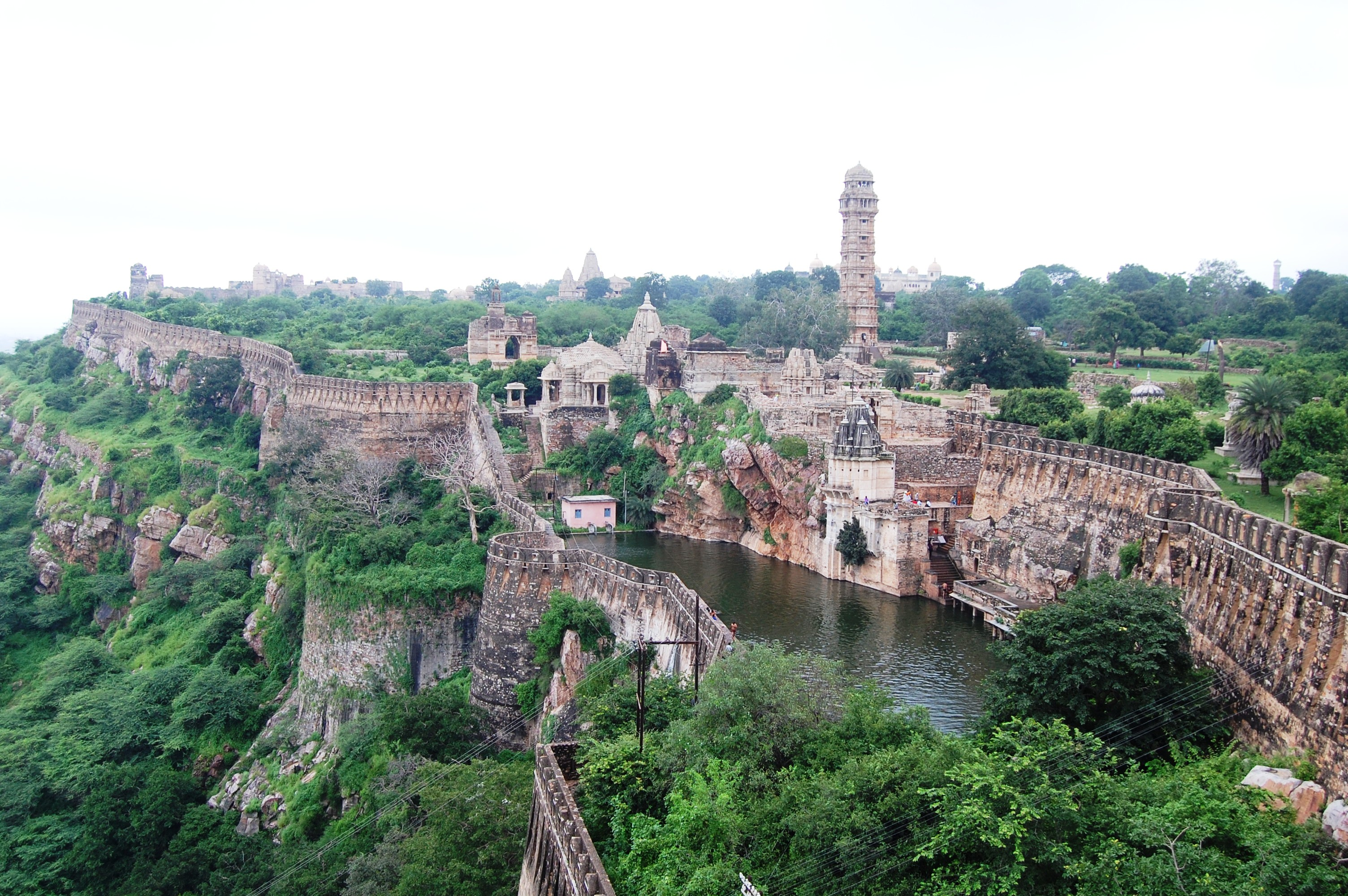
- A view of Chittorgarh Fort, Rajasthan, India

Site information
- Other site facilities: Floor area: 280 ha (691.9 acres)

Location
- Location within India Location within Rajasthan
- Coordinates: 24.8863°N 74.647°E

Site history
- Battles/wars: Siege of Chittorgarh (1303); Battle of Chittor (1321); Siege of Chittorgarh (1535); Siege of Chittorgarh (1567–1568)

Garrison information
- Occupants: Mori Kingdom, Guhilas of Medapata, Delhi Sultanate, Gujarat Sultanate, Mughal Empire, Sisodias of Mewar, British Raj, Republic of India

UNESCO World Heritage Site
- Type: Cultural
- Criteria: ii, iii
- Designated: 2013 (37th session)
- Part of: Hill Forts of Rajasthan
- Reference no.: 247
- Region: South Asia

Chittor Fort (the literal translation of the Hindi Chittorgarh), also known as Chittod Fort, is one of the largest forts in India. It is a UNESCO World Heritage Site. The fort was the capital of Mewar and is located in the present-day city of Chittorgarh. It sprawls over a hill 180 m (590.6 ft) in height, spread over an area of 280 ha (691.9 acres) above the plains of the valley drained by the Berach River. The fort covers 65 historic structures, which include four palaces, 19 large temples, 20 large water bodies, 4 memorials, and a few victory towers.

In 2013, at the 37th session of the World Heritage Committee held in Phnom Penh, Cambodia, the group of six Hill Forts of Rajasthan, including Chittor Fort, was declared a World Heritage Site.

== Geography ==
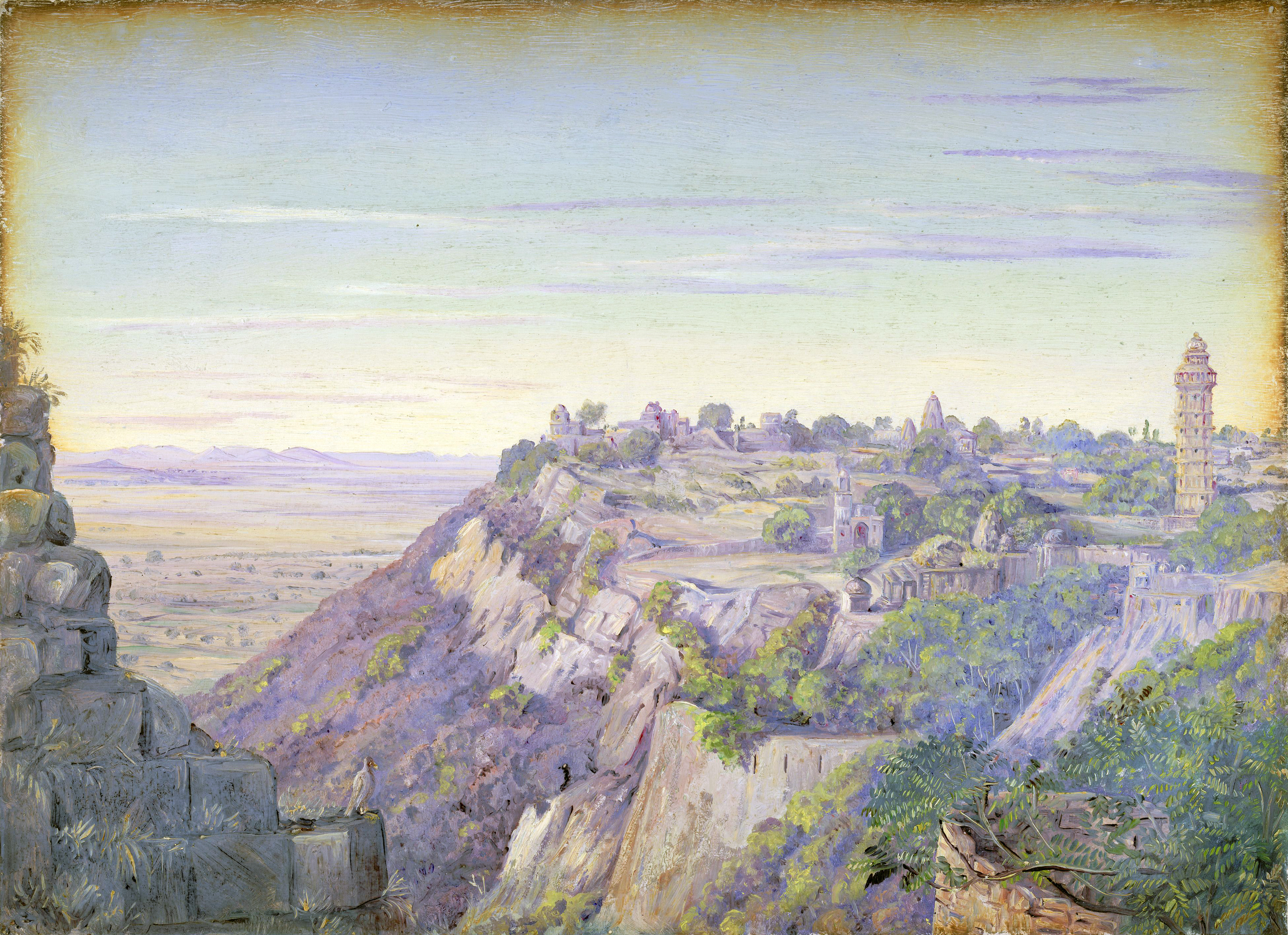
A painting of the fort by Marianne North, 1878

The city of Chittorgarh, located in the southern part of the state of Rajasthan, is 233 km (144.8 mi) from Ajmer, midway between Delhi and Mumbai on National Highway 48, which forms part of the Golden Quadrilateral road network. Chittorgarh is situated where National Highways No. 76 and 79 intersect.

The fort stands on a hill that rises abruptly 180 m (590.6 ft) above the surrounding plains, and the fort is spread over an area of 2.8 km^{2} (1.1 mi^{2}). It is situated on the right bank of the Berach River (a tributary of the Banas River) and is linked to the new town of Chittorgarh (known as the 'Lower Town') developed in the plains after 1568 AD when the fort was deserted following the introduction of artillery in the 16th century, and therefore the capital was shifted to the more secure Udaipur, located on the eastern flank of the Aravalli hill range, where heavy artillery and cavalry were not effective. Mughal Emperor Akbar attacked and sacked this fort, which was but one of the 84 forts of Mewar.

A winding hill road of more than 1 km (0.6 mi) length from the new town leads to the west end main gate of the fort, called Ram Pol. Within the fort, a circular road provides access to all the gates and monuments located within the fort walls.

The fort that once boasted 84 water bodies now has only 22. These water bodies are fed by natural catchment and rainfall, and have a combined storage of 4 billion litres that could meet the water needs of an army of 50,000. The supply could last for four years. These water bodies are in the form of ponds, wells, and stepwells.

== History ==
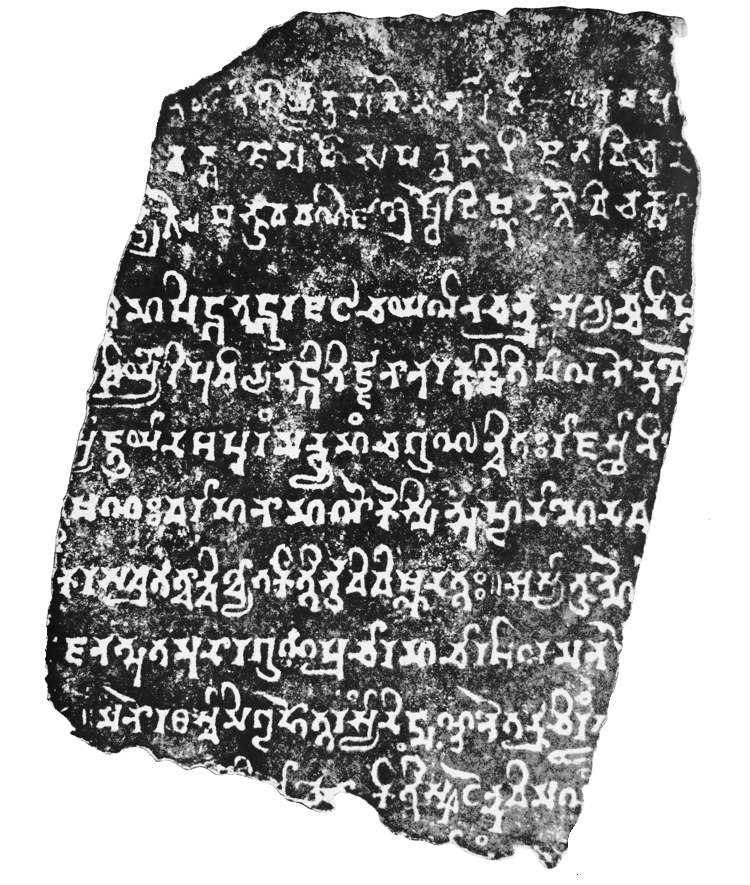
Chittorgarh fragmentary inscriptions of the Naigamas, first half of the 6th century CE

Chittorgarh (garh means fort) was originally called Chitrakut. It was constructed by the Mori (Note: Sometimes referred to as the Later Mauryas, to distinguish them from the unrelated earlier Maurya Empire.) ruler Chitrangada Mori. According to one legend, the name of the fort is derived from its builder. Several small Buddhist stupas dated to the 9th century based on the script were found at the edge of Jaimal Patta lake.

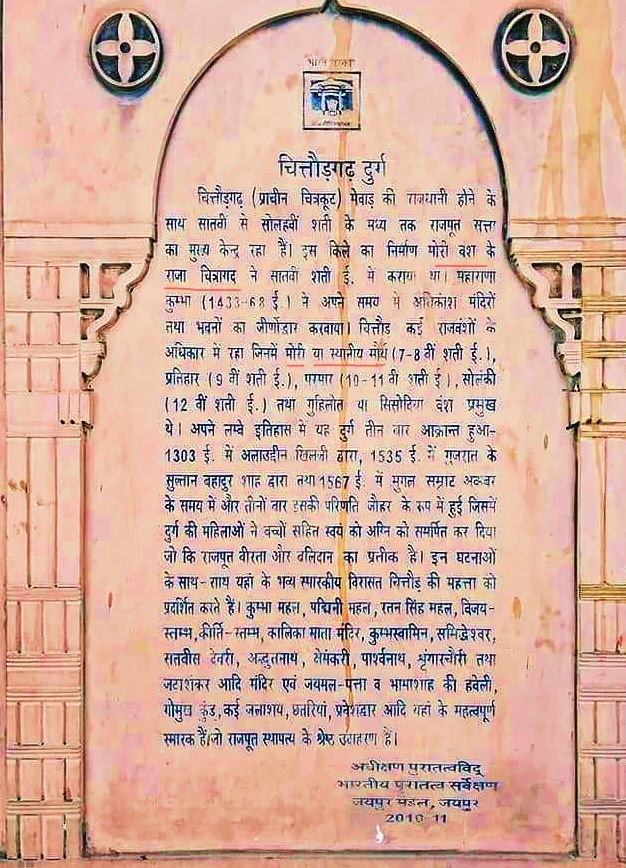

The Guhila ruler Bappa Rawal is said to have captured the fort in either 728 CE or 734 CE. One account states that he received the fort in dowry. According to other versions of the legend, Bappa Rawal captured the fort either from the Moris. Historian R. C. Majumdar theorizes that the Moris were ruling at Chittor when the Arabs invaded north-western India around 725 CE. The Arabs defeated the Moris, and in turn, were defeated by a confederacy that included Bappa Rawal. R. V. Somani theorized that Bappa Rawal was a part of the army of Nagabhata I. Some historians doubt the historicity of this legend, arguing that the Guhilas did not control Chittor before the reign of the later ruler Allata. The earliest Guhila inscription discovered at Chittor is from the reign of Tejasimha (mid-13th century); it mentions "Chitrakuta-maha-durga" (the great fort of Chittor).

Under the orders of Alauddin Khilji, between 1251 and 1258, Balban repeatedly led armies to attack and lay siege to Chittor fort, as well as Ranthambore and Bundi forts.

=== Siege of 1303 ===
Padmini's Palace

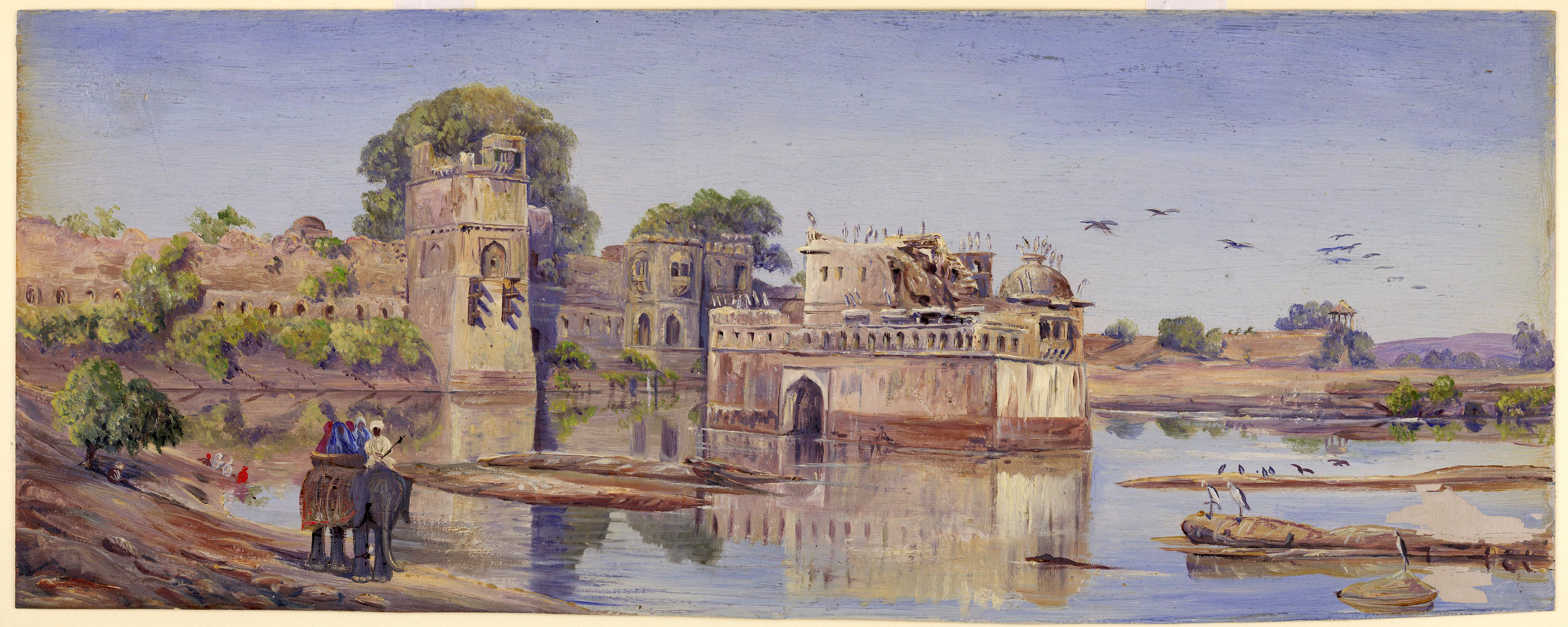
An 1878 painting by Marianne North

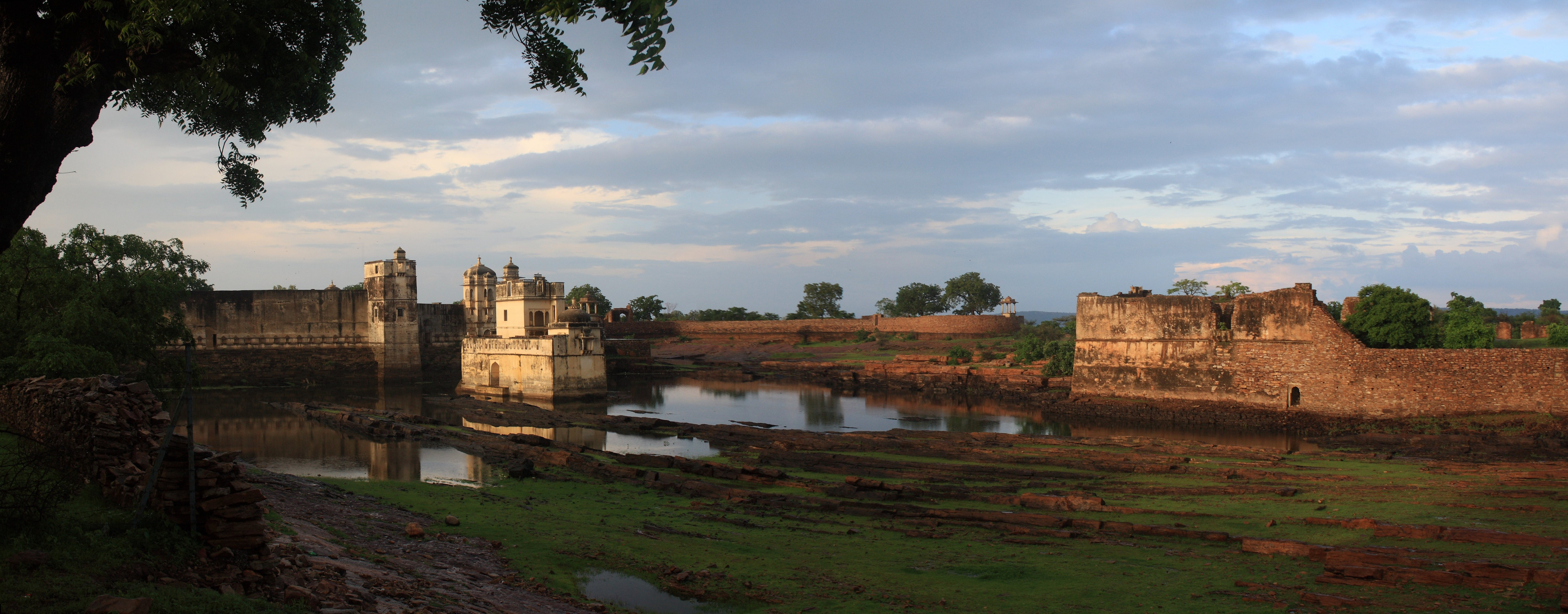
A 2010 photograph

In 1303, the Delhi Sultanate or Delhi Sultans ruler Alauddin Khalji led an army to conquer Chittorgarh, which was ruled by the Guhila king Ratnasimha. Alauddin captured Chittor after an eight-month-long siege. According to his courtier Amir Khusrow, he ordered a massacre of 30,000 local Hindus after this conquest. Some later legends state that Alauddin invaded Chittor to capture Ratnasimha's beautiful queen Padmini. Still, most modern historians have rejected the authenticity of these legends. The legends also state that Padmini and other women committed suicide by jauhar (mass self-immolation). Historian Kishori Saran Lal believes that a jauhar did happen at Chittorgarh following Alauddin's conquest, although he dismisses the legend of Padmini as unhistorical. On the other hand, historian Banarsi Prasad Saksena considers this jauhar narrative as a fabrication by the later writers, because Khusrow does not mention any jauhar at Chittorgarh. However, he has referred to the jauhar during the earlier conquest of Ranthambore.

Alauddin assigned Chittorgarh to his young son Khizr Khan (or Khidr Khan), and the Chittor fort was renamed "Khizrabad" after the prince. As Khizr Khan was only a child, the actual administration was handed over to an enslaved person named Malik Shahin.

=== Rana Hammir and successors ===
Khizr Khan's rule at the fort lasted till 1311 AD, and due to the pressure of Rajputs, he was forced to entrust power to the Sonigra chief Maldeva, who held the fort for 7 years. Hammir Singh usurped control of the fort from Maldeva, and Chittor once again came under rajput rule. Hammir, before he died in 1378 AD, had converted Mewar into a fairly large and prosperous kingdom. The dynasty (and clan) fathered by him came to be known by the name Sisodia after the village where he was born. His son Rana Kshetra Singh or Rana Kheta succeeded him and ruled with honour and power. Rana Kheta's son Rana Lakha (Lakshya), who ascended the throne in 1382 AD, also won several wars. His famous grandson Rana Kumbha came to the throne in 1433 AD and by that time the Muslim rulers of Malwa and Gujarat had acquired considerable clout and were keen to usurp the powerful Mewar state.

=== Rana Kumbha and clan ===
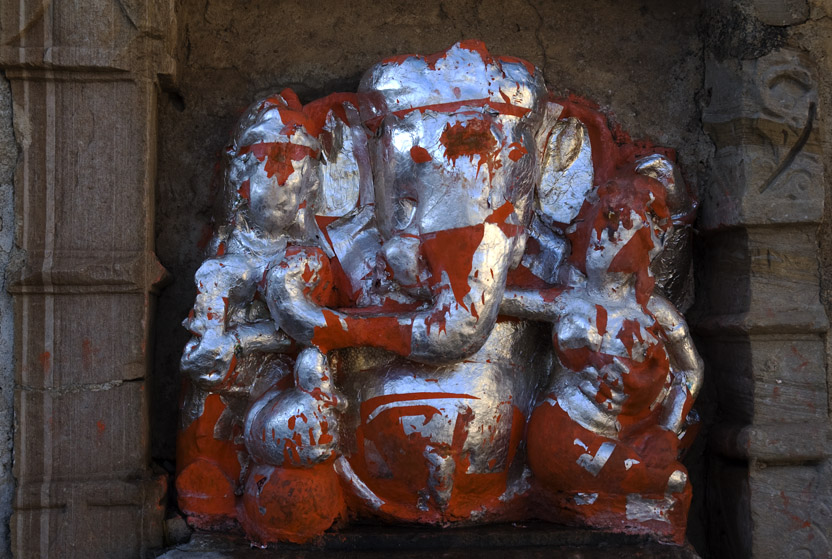
Ganesh statue at Chittorgarh Fort

There was a resurgence during the reign of Rana Kumbha in the 15th century. Rana Kumbha, also known as Maharana Kumbhakarna, son of Rana Mokal, ruled Mewar between 1433 AD and 1468 AD. He is credited with building up the Mewar kingdom assiduously as a force to reckon with. He built 32 forts (84 fortresses formed the defense of Mewar), including one in his own name, called Kumbalgarh. His younger son, Rana Raimal, assumed the reins of power in 1473. After Raimal's death in May 1509, Sangram Singh (also known as Rana Sanga), his younger son, became the ruler of Mewar, which brought in a new phase in the history of Mewar.

=== Chittorgarh Under Rana Sanga ===
Rana Sanga ascended the throne in 1509 after a long struggle with his brothers, Prithviraj and Jaimal. He was an ambitious king under whom Mewar reached its zenith in power and prosperity. Rajput strength under Rana Sanga reached its zenith and threatens to revive their powers again in Northern India. He established a strong kingdom from Satluj in Punjab in North till Narmada River in South in Malwa after conquering Malwa and the Thar desert to the west and until Bayana in the east. In his military career, he defeated Ibrahim Lodhi at the Battle of Khatoli and managed to free most of Rajasthan. Along with that, he marked his control over parts of Uttar Pradesh, including Chandwar. He gave the part of U.P to his allies, Rao Manik Chand Chauhan, who later supported him in Battle of Khanwa. After that, Rana Sanga fought another battle with Ibrahim Lodhi, known as Battle of Dholpur, where again the Rajput confederacy was victorious. This time, following his victory, Sanga conquered much of the Malwa along with Chanderi and bestowed it on one of his vassals, Medini Rai. Rai ruled over Malwa with Chanderi as his capital. Sanga also invaded Gujarat with 50,000 Rajput confederacy joined by his three allies. He plundered the Gujarat sultanate and chased the Muslim Army as far as the capital Ahmedabad. He successfully annexed Northern Gujarat and appointed one of his vassals to rule there. Following the series of victories over Sultans, he successfully established his sovereignty over Rajasthan, Malwa, and large parts of Gujarat. After these victories he united several Rajput states from Northern India to expel Babur from India and re-establish Hindu power in Delhi. He advanced with a grand army of 100,000 Rajputs supported by a few Afghans to expel Babur and to expand his territory by annexing Delhi and Agra. The battle was fought for supremacy of Northern India between Rajputs and Mughals. However, Rajput Confederation suffered a disastrous defeat at Khanwa due to Babur's superior generalship and modern tactics. The battle was more historic than First Battle of Panipat as it firmly established Mughal rule in India while crushing re-emerging Rajput powers. The battle was also earliest to use cannons, matchlocks, swivel guns and mortars to great use.

Rana Sanga was taken away from the battlefield in an unconscious state by his vassals Prithviraj Singh I of Jaipur and Maldeo Rathore of Marwar. After regaining consciousness, he took an oath to never return to Chittorgarh until he defeated Babur and conquered Delhi. He also stopped wearing a turban and used to wrap a cloth over his head. While he was preparing to wage another war against Babur, he was poisoned by his own nobles who did not want another battle with Babur. He died in Kalpi in January 1528.

After his defeat, his vassal Medini Rai was defeated by Babur at Battle of Chanderi, and Babur captured the capital of the Rai kingdom Chanderi. Medini was offered Shamsabad instead of Chanderi as it was historically important in conquering Malwa, but Rai refused the offer and chose to die fighting. The Rajput women and children committed self-immolation to save their honor from the Muslim army. After the victory, Babur captured Chanderi along with Malwa, which was ruled by Rai.

=== Siege of 1535 ===
Bahadur Shah, who came to the throne in 1526 AD as the Sultan of Gujarat, besieged the Chittorgarh fort in 1535. The fort was sacked and, once again, the medieval dictates of chivalry determined the outcome. Following the escape of the Rana Vikramaditya, his brother Udai Singh II and the faithful maid Panna Dai to their maternal relatives land of Bundi, it is said that their mother Rani Karnavati led 13,000 Rajput women in committing jauhar (self-immolation on the funeral pyre) as 3,200 Rajput warriors rushed out of the fort to fight till death (Saka) and died in the ensuing battle.

=== Siege of 1567 ===
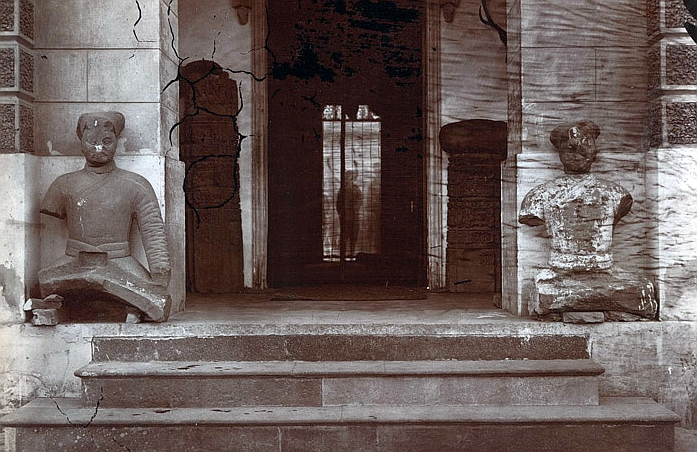
Rao Jaimal and Patta (Rajasthan), mounted on a pair of black marble elephants which stood outside the Delhi Gate at the Red Fort. Originally stood outside the fort at Agra

The final Siege of Chittorgarh came 33 years later, in 1567, when the Mughal Emperor Akbar attacked the fort. Akbar wanted to conquer Mewar, which was being ruled by Rana Uday Singh II, to gain easy access to the Gujarati ports and establish a trade route.

Shakti Singh, son of the Rana who had quarreled with his father, had run away and approached Akbar when the latter had camped at Dholpur preparing to attack Malwa. During one of these meetings, in August 1567, Shakti Singh deduced from a remark made in jest by Emperor Akbar that he intended to wage war against Chittorgarh. Akbar had told Shakti Singh in jest that since his father had not submitted himself before him like other princes and chieftains of the region, he would attack him. Startled by this revelation, Shakti Singh quietly rushed back to Chittorgarh and informed his father of the impending invasion by Akbar. Akbar was furious with the departure of Shakti Singh and decided to attack Mewar to humble the arrogance of the Ranas.

In September 1567, the emperor left for Chittorgarh, and on 20 October 1567, camped in the vast plains outside the fort. In the meantime, Rana Udai Singh, on the advice of his council of advisors, decided to go away from Chittor to the hills of Gogunda with his family. Jaimal and Patta were left behind to defend the fort along with 8,000 Rajput soldiers under their command. Akbar laid siege to the fortress, which lasted for 4 months.

On 22 February 1568, Jaimal was killed by a musket shot fired by Akbar himself. Jauhar was committed in the houses of Patta, Aissar Das, and Sahib Khan. The next day, the gates of the fort were opened, and Rajput soldiers rushed out to fight the enemies. In the ensuing battle, the army of Chittorgarh was killed alongside 20,000–25,000 civilians, and Chittorgarh was conquered.

=== Mughal–Rajput peace treaty of 1615 ===
In 1615, after a treaty between Jahangir and Amar Singh, Chittorgarh was given back to Amar Singh by Jahangir.

The fort was refurbished in 1905 during British Raj.

== Precincts ==
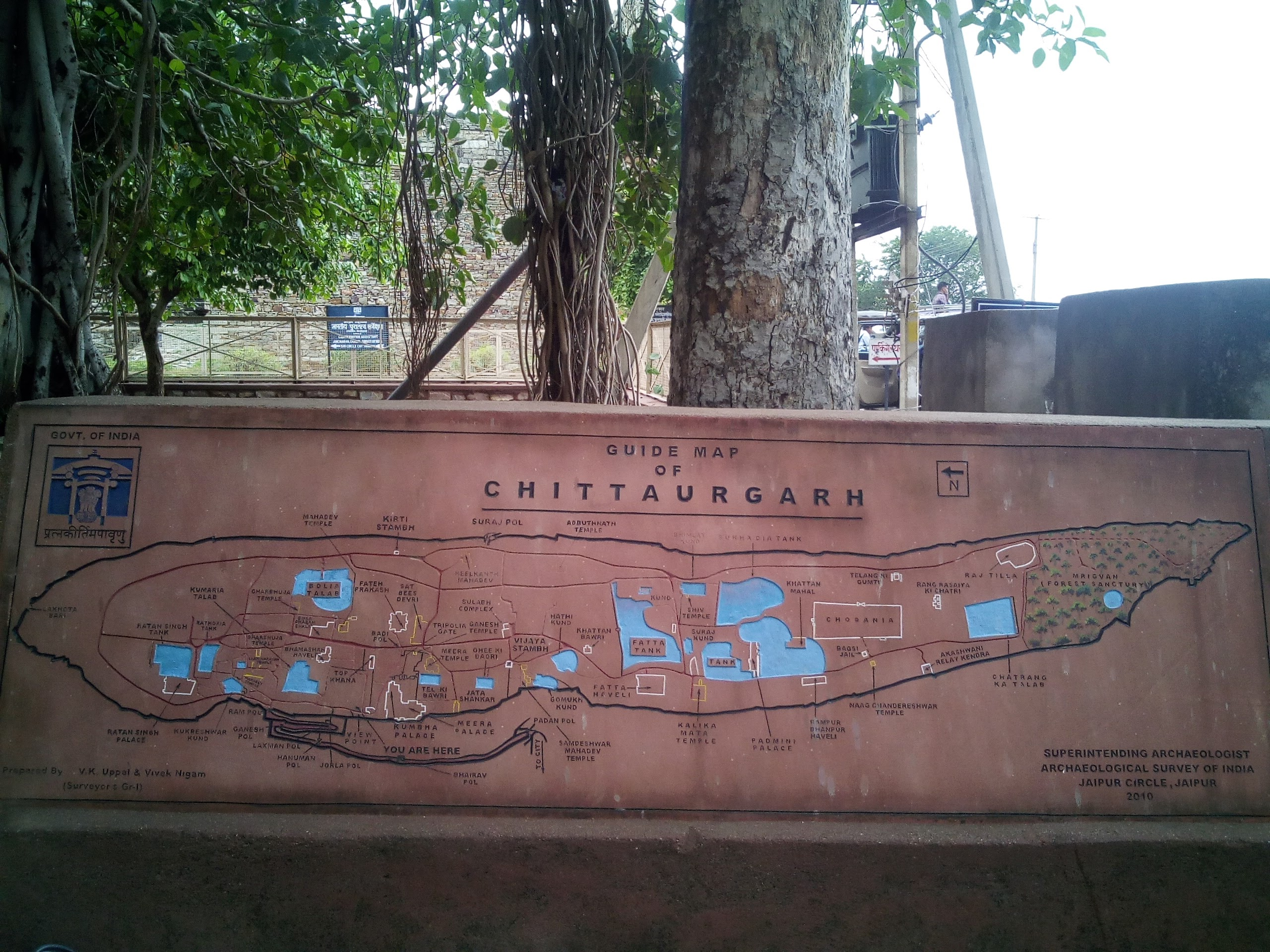
Map of Chittorgarh Fort

The fort, which is roughly in the shape of a fish, has a circumference of 13 km (8.1 mi) with a maximum length of 5 km (3.1 mi), and it covers an area of 700 acres. The fort is approached through a difficult zig-zag ascent of more than 1 km (0.6 mi) from the plains, after crossing over a limestone bridge. The bridge spans the Gambhiri River and is supported by ten arches (one has a curved shape while the balance have pointed arches). Apart from the two tall towers, which dominate the majestic fortifications, the sprawling fort has a plethora of palaces and temples (many of them in ruins) within its precincts.

The 305-hectare component site, with a buffer zone of 427 hectares, encompasses the fortified stronghold of Chittorgarh, a spacious fort located on an isolated rocky plateau of approximately 2 km length and 155 m width.

It is surrounded by a perimeter wall 13 km (8.1 mi) long, beyond which a 45° hill slope makes it almost inaccessible to enemies. The ascent to the fort passes through seven gateways built by the Mewar ruler Rana Kumbha (1433–1468) of the Sisodia clan. These gates are called, from the base to the hilltop, the Paidal Pol, Bhairon Pol, Hanuman Pol, Ganesh Pol, Jorla Pol, Laxman Pol, and Ram Pol, the final and main gate.

The fort complex comprises 65 historic built structures, among them 4 palace complexes, 19 main temples, 4 memorials, and 20 functional water bodies. These can be divided into two major construction phases. The first hill fort with one main entrance was established in the 5th century and successively fortified until the 12th century. Its remains are mostly visible on the western edges of the plateau. The second, more significant defence structure was constructed in the 15th century during the reign of the Sisodia Rajputs, when the royal entrance was relocated and fortified with seven gates, and the medieval fortification wall was built on an earlier wall construction from the 13th century.

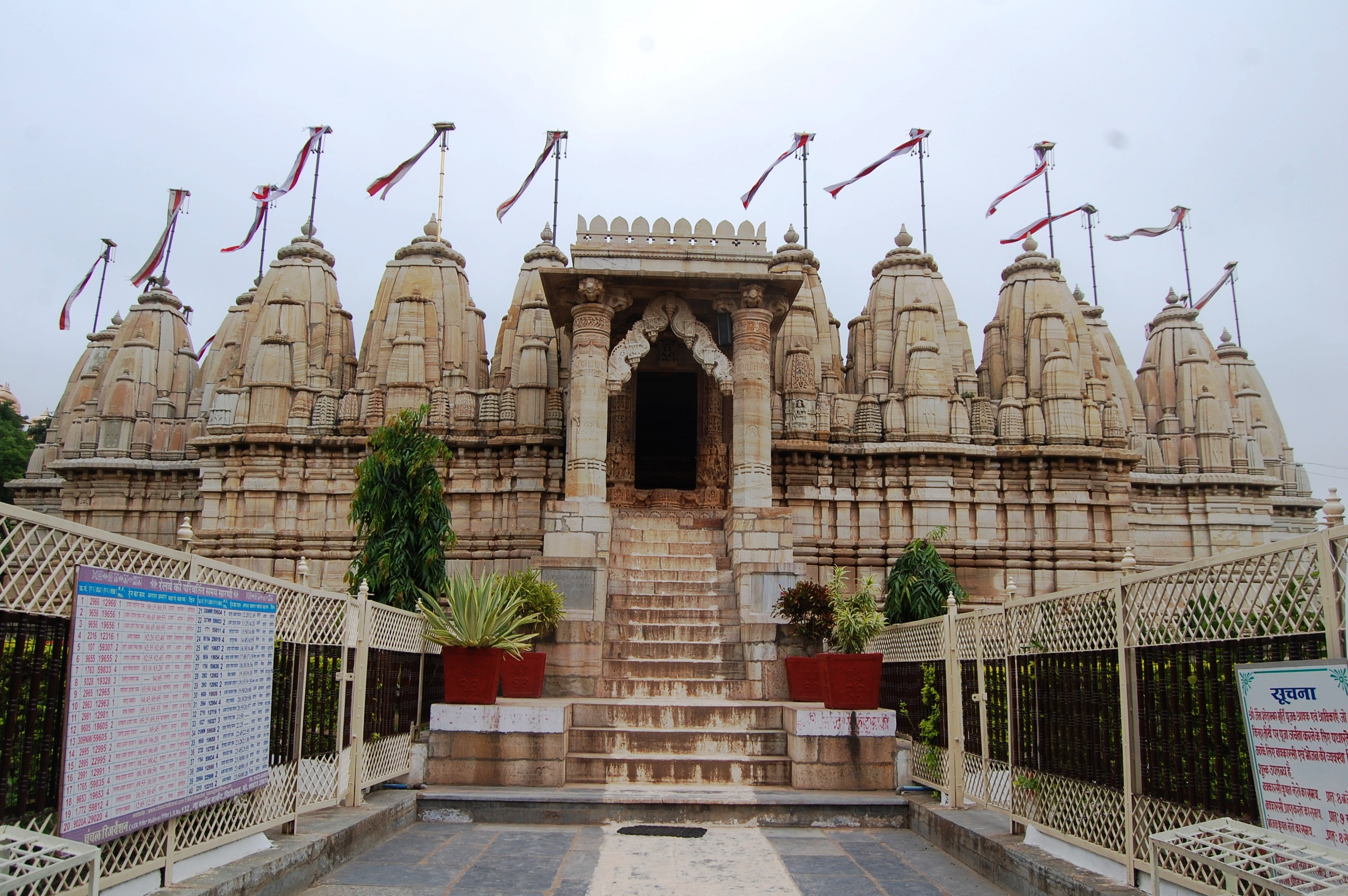
Satbees Deori Jain temple

Besides the palace complex, located on the highest and most secure terrain in the west of the fort, many of the other significant structures, such as the Kumbha Shyam Temple, the Mira Bai Temple, the Adi Varah Temple, the Shringar Chauri Temple, Ravidas chhatri (pavilion) in front of Meera's temple which bears Guru Ravidas' engraved foot print and the Vijay Stambh memorial were constructed in this second phase. Compared to the later additions of Sisodian rulers during the 19th and 20th centuries, the predominant construction phase illustrates a comparatively pure Rajput style combined with minimal eclecticism, such as the vaulted substructures, which were borrowed from Sultanate architecture. The 4.5 km walls with integrated circular enforcements are constructed from dressed stone masonry in lime mortar and rise 500 m above the plain. With the help of the seven massive stone gates, partly flanked by hexagonal or octagonal towers, access to the fort is restricted to a narrow pathway that climbs up the steep hill through successive, ever-narrower defense passages. The seventh and final gate leads directly into the palace area, which integrates a variety of residential and official structures. Rana Kumbha Mahal, the palace of Rana Kumbha, is a large Rajput domestic structure and now incorporates the Kanwar Pade Ka Mahal (the palace of the heir) and the later palace of the poet Mira Bai (1498–1546). The palace area was further expanded in later centuries, when additional structures, such as the Ratan Singh Palace (1528–1531) or the Fateh Prakash, also named Badal Mahal (1885–1930), were added.

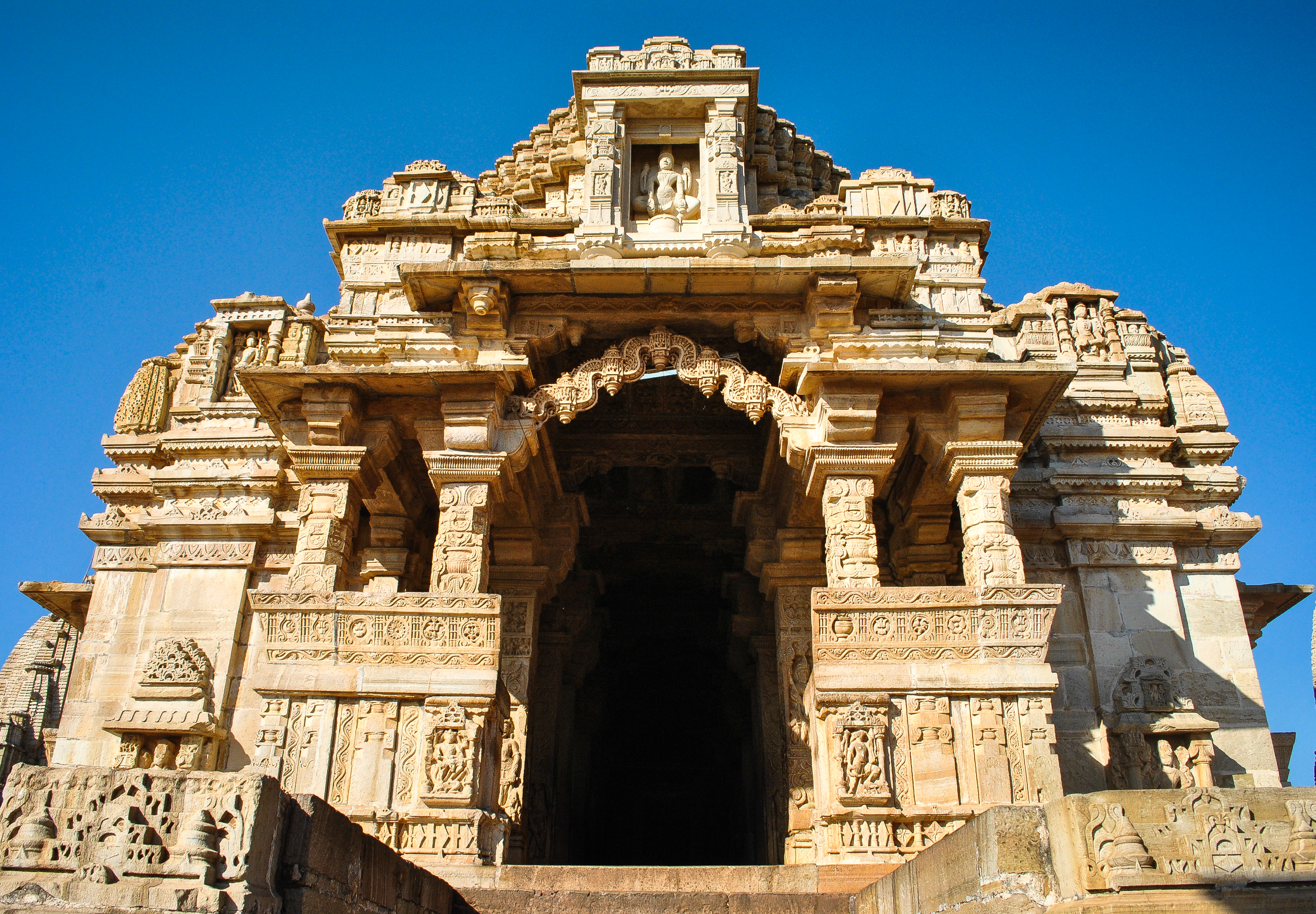
Jain temple near Kirti stambha

Although the majority of temple structures represent the Hindu faith, most prominently the Kalikamata Temple (8th century), the Kshemankari Temple (825–850), the Kumbha Shyam Temple (1448), or the Adbuthnath Temple (15th–16th century), the hill fort also contains Jain temples, such as Sattaees Devari, Shringar Chauri (1448), and Sat Bis Devri (mid-15th century). Finally, the fort compound is home to a contemporary municipal ward of approximately 3,000 inhabitants, which is located near Ratan Singh Tank at the northern end of the property.

=== Gates ===
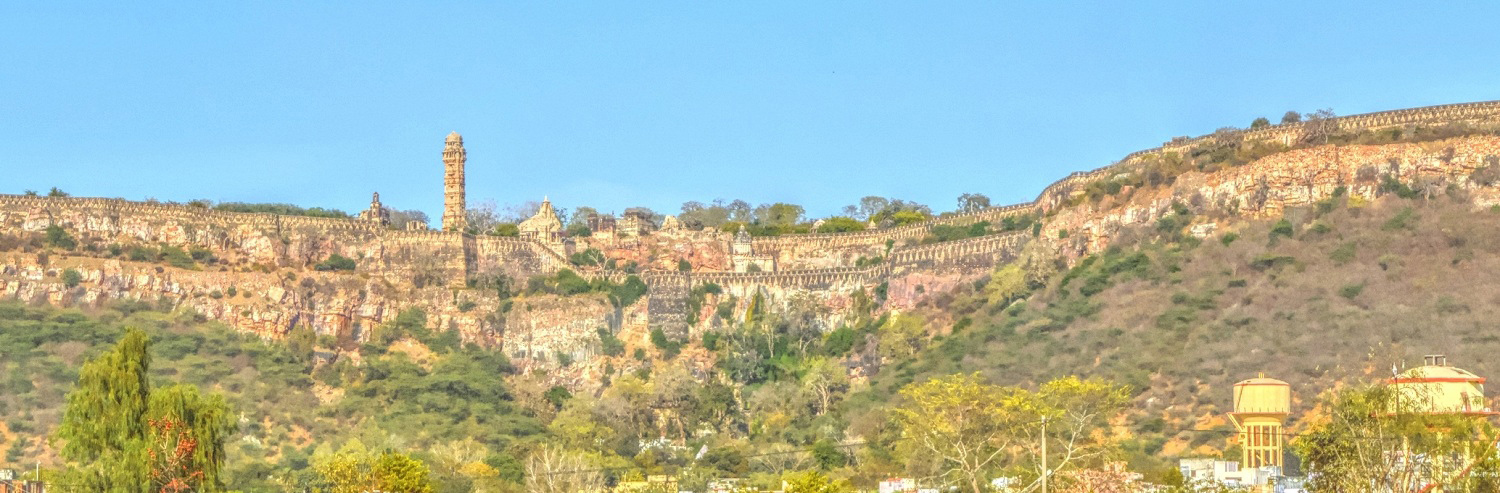
A view of the fort from Chittorgarh town

The fort has a total of seven gates made by Maharana KUMBHA. (In the local language, the gate is called Pol) In the west, namely the Padan Pol, Bhairon Pol, Hanuman Pol, Ganesh Pol, Jodla Pol, Laxman Pol, and the main gate named the Ram Pol (Lord Rama's Gate). All the gateways to the fort have been built as massive stone structures with secure fortifications for military defense. The doors of the gates with pointed arches are reinforced to fend off elephants and cannon shots. The top of the gates has notched parapets for archers to shoot at the enemy army. A circular road within the fort links all the gates and provides access to the numerous monuments (ruined palaces and 130 temples) in the fort.

On the right of Suraj Pol is the Darikhana or Sabha (council chamber), behind which lie a Ganesha temple and the zenana (living quarters for women). A massive water reservoir is located towards the left of Suraj Pol. There is also a peculiar gate, called the Jorla Pol (Joined Gate), which consists of two gates joined. The upper arch of Jorla Pol is connected to the base of Lakshman Pol, a feature that has not been noticed anywhere else in India. The Lokota Bari is the gate at the fort's northern tip, while a small opening that was used to hurl criminals into the abyss is seen at the southern end.

=== Vijaya Stambha ===
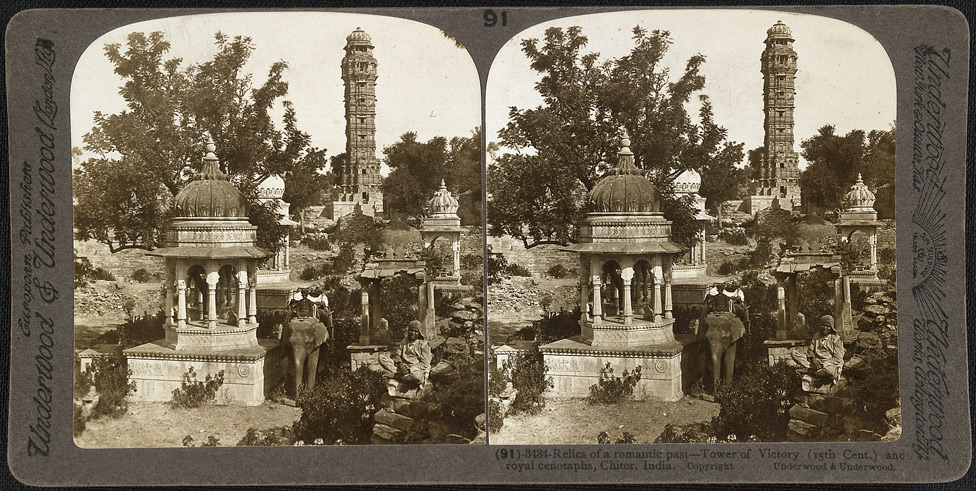
Vijaya Stambha with other relics stereoscopic view

The Vijaya Stambha (Tower of Victory) or Jaya Stambha, called the symbol of Chittorgarh and a particularly bold expression of triumph, was erected by Rana Kumbha between 1458 and 1468 to commemorate his victory over Mahmud Shah I Khalji, the Sultan of Malwa, in 1440 AD. Built over a period of ten years, it rises 37.2 metres (122 ft) over a 47 square feet (4.4 m^{2}) base in nine stories accessed through a narrow circular staircase of 157 steps (the interior is also carved) up to the 8th floor, from where there is good view of the plains and the new town of Chittorgarh. The dome, which was a later addition, was damaged by lightning and repaired during the 19th century. The Stambha is now illuminated during the evenings and gives a beautiful view of Chittorgarh from the top.

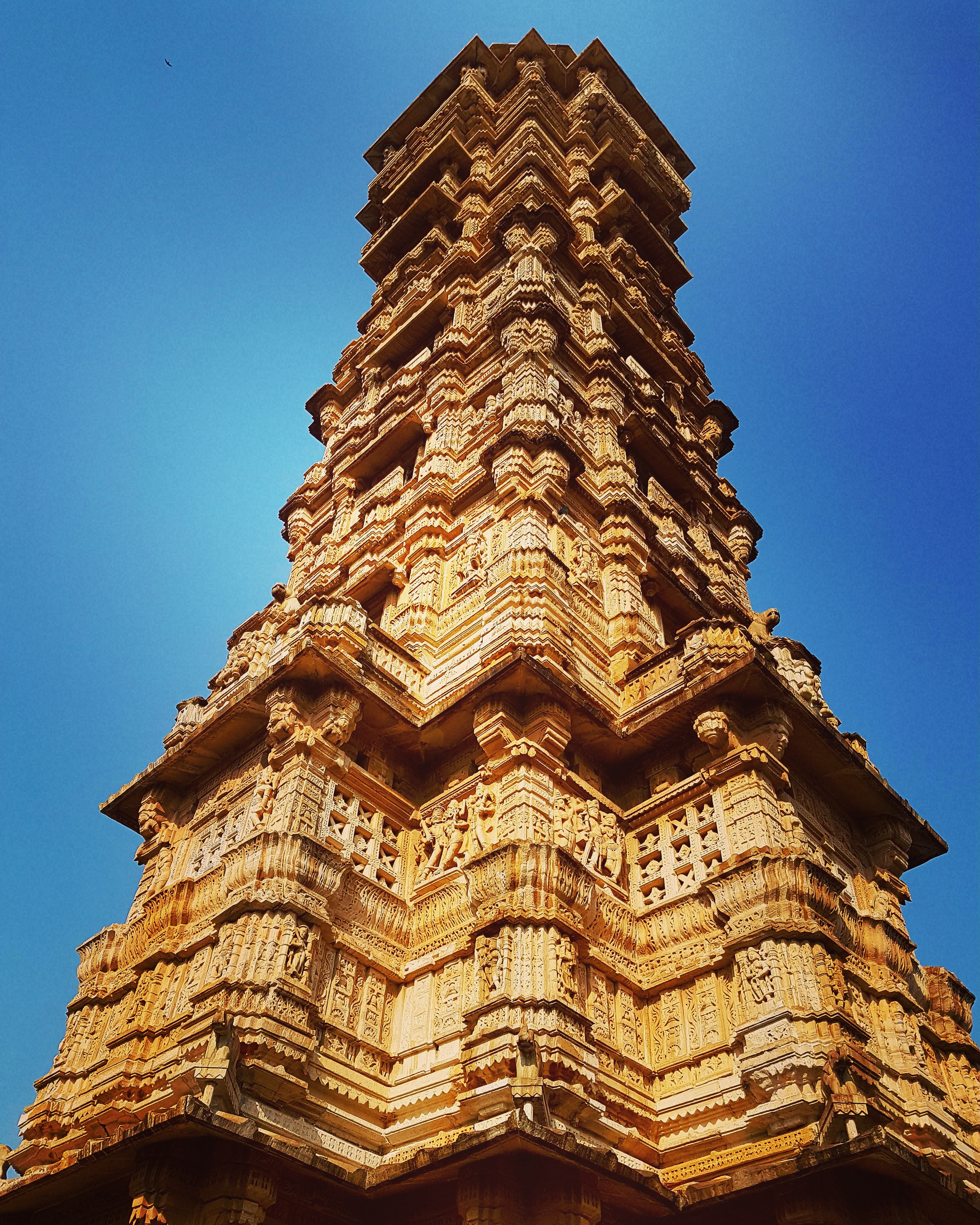
Vijaya Stambha

=== Kirti Stambha ===
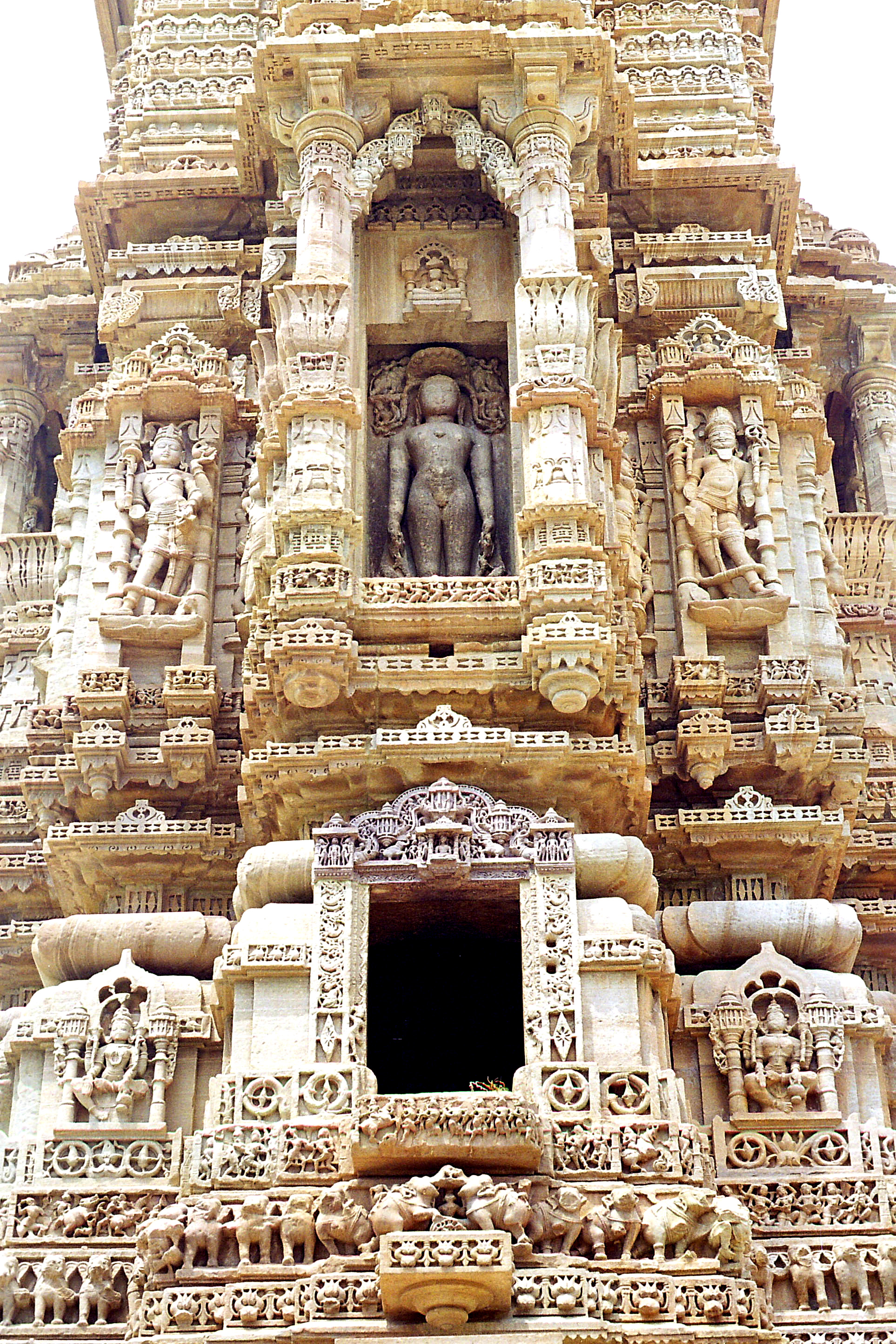
Architectural details from the Kirti Stambh

Kirti Stambha (Tower of Fame) is a 22-metre-high (72 ft) tower built on a 30-foot (9.1 m) base with 15 feet (4.6 m) at the top; it is adorned with Jain sculptures on the outside and is older (probably 12th century) and smaller than the Victory Tower. Built by the Bagherwal Jain merchant Jijaji Rathod, it is dedicated to Adinath, the first Jain tirthankar (revered Jain teacher). In the lowest floor of the tower, figures of the various tirthankars of the Jain pantheon are seen in special niches formed to house them. These are digambara monuments. A narrow stairway with 54 steps leads through the six storeys to the top. The top pavilion that was added in the 15th century has 12 columns.

=== Rana Kumbha Palace ===
Rana Kumbha's palace (in ruins) is at the entrance gate near the Vijaya Stamba. The palace included elephant and horse stables and a temple to Lord Shiva. Maharana Udai Singh, the founder of Udaipur, was born here; the popular folklore linked to his birth is that his maid Panna Dai saved him by substituting her son in his place as a decoy, which resulted in her son being killed by Banbir. The prince was spirited away in a fruit basket. The palace is built with plastered stone. The remarkable feature of the palace is its splendid series of canopied balconies. Entry to the palace is through Suraj Pol, which leads into a courtyard. The famous poet-saint, Rani Meera, also lived in this palace. This is also the palace where Rani Padmini is said to have consigned herself to the funeral pyre in one of the underground cellars, as an act of Jauhar along with many other women. The Nau Lakha Bandar (literal meaning: nine lakh treasury) building, the royal treasury of Chittorgarh, was also located close by. Now, across from the palace is a museum and archaeological office. The Singa Chowri temple is also nearby.

=== Fateh Prakash Palace ===
Located near Rana Khumba palace, built by Rana Fateh Singh, the precincts have modern houses and a small museum. A school for local children (about 5,000 villagers live within the fort) is also nearby.

=== Gaumukh Reservoir ===
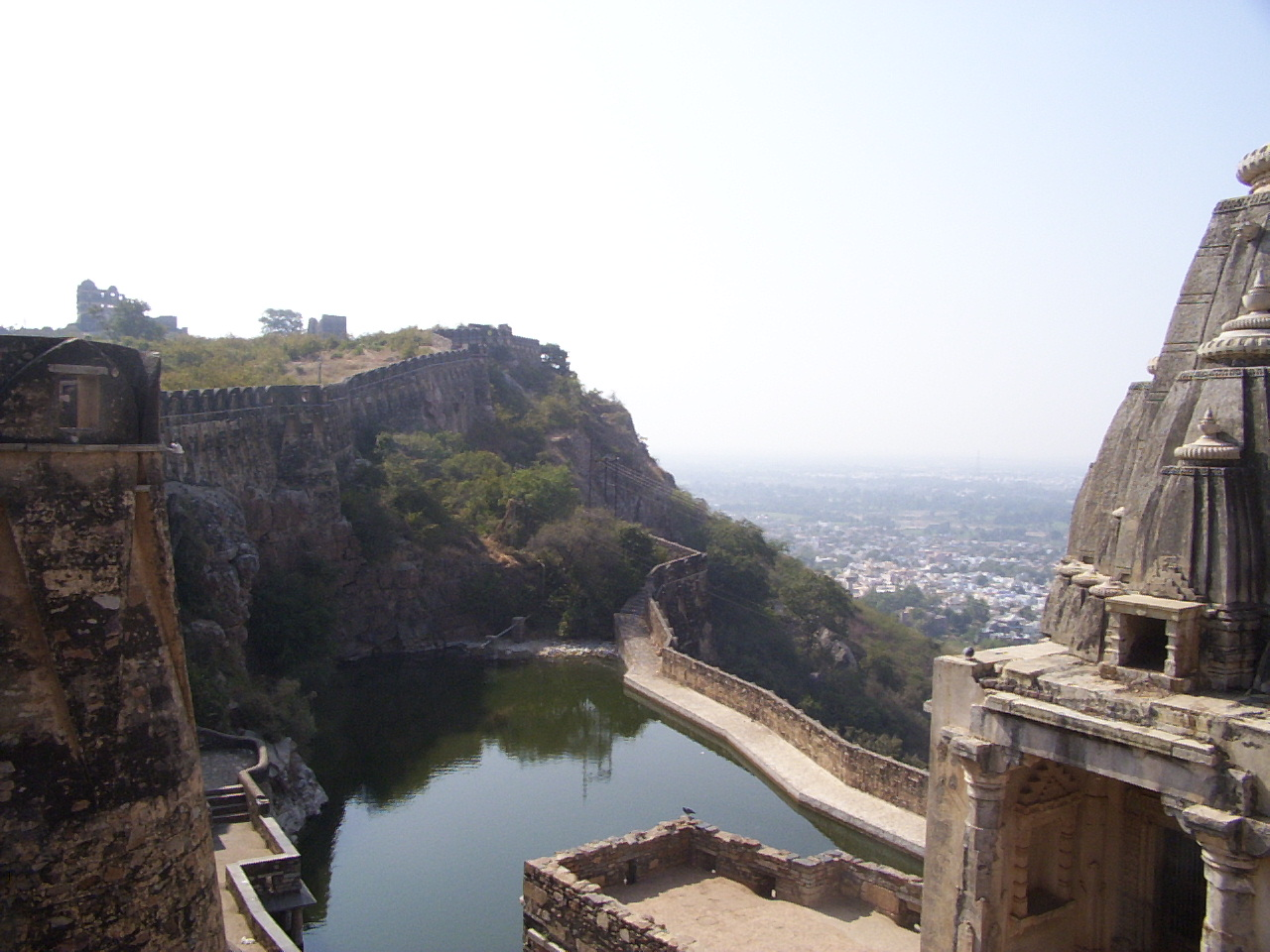
The Gaumukh Reservoir

A spring feeds the tank from a carved cow's mouth in the cliff. This pool was the main source of water at the fort during the numerous sieges.

=== Padmini's Palace ===
Padmini's Palace or Rani Padmini's Palace is a white building and a three-storied structure (a 19th-century reconstruction of the original). It is located in the southern part of the fort. Chhatris (pavilions) crown the palace roofs, and a water moat surrounds the palace. This style of the palace became the forerunner of other palaces built in the state with the concept of Jal Mahal (palace surrounded by water). Maharana Ratan Singh was killed, and Rani Padmini committed Jauhar. Rani Padmini's beauty has been compared to that of Cleopatra, and her life story is an eternal legend in the history of Chittorgarh. This Palace finds its reference in some of the historical texts of Mewar. Amar Kavyam mentions the confinement of Mahmud Khilji- II, Sultan of Malwa, here by Rana Sanga. Maharana Udai Singh married his daughter JasmaDe to Rai Singh of Bikaner. A song was composed about the charity done by Rai Singh, in which it is mentioned that he donated an elephant for each step of the stairs of Padmini's Palace. It was repaired by Maharana Sajjan Singh.

=== Other sights ===
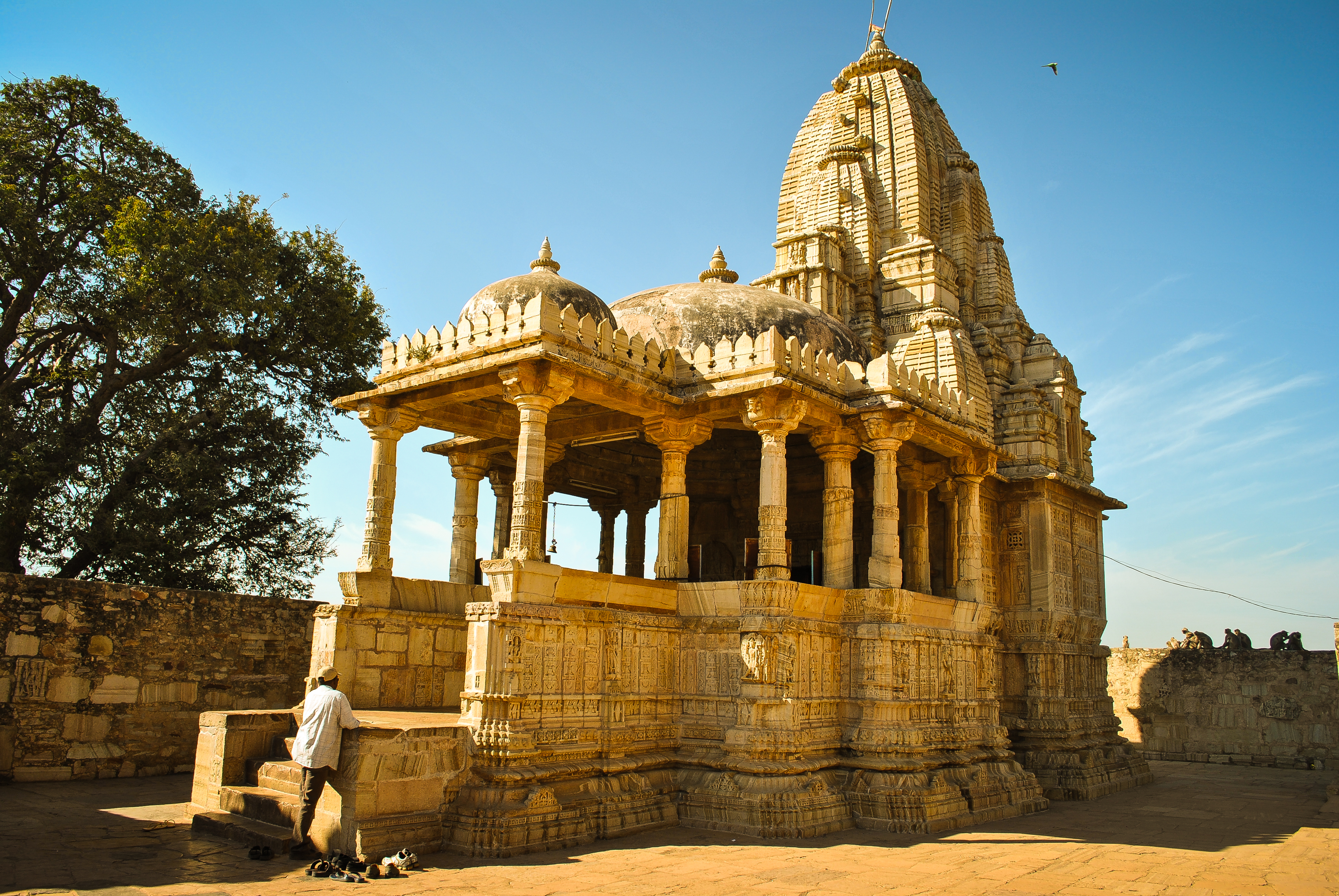
Meera Temple, where saint Mirabai prayed to Krishna, starting her Bhakti movement. Chittorgarh Fort, Rajasthan

Close to Vijay Sthamba is the Meera Temple, or the Meerabai Temple. Rana Khumba built it in an ornate Indo-Aryan architectural style. It is associated with the mystic saint-poet Mirabai who was an ardent devotee of Krishna and dedicated her entire life to His worship. She composed and sang lyrical bhajans called Meera Bhajans. The popular legend associated with her is that with the blessings of Krishna, she survived after consuming poison sent to her by her evil brother-in-law. The larger temple in the same compound is the Kumbha Shyam Temple (Varaha Temple). The pinnacle of the temple is in pyramid shape. A picture of Meerabai praying before Krishna has now been installed in the temple.

Across from Padmini's Palace is the Kalika Mata Temple. Originally, a Sun Temple, dated to the 8th century, dedicated to Surya (the Sun God), was destroyed in the 14th century. It was rebuilt as a Kali temple.

Another temple on the west side of the fort is an old temple dedicated to the goddess Tulja Bhavani, built by Vanvir Singh. The Tope Khana (cannon foundry) is located next to this temple in a courtyard, where a few old cannons are still seen.

== Culture ==
The fort and the city of Chittorgarh host the biggest Rajput festival called the "Jauhar Meala". It takes place annually on the anniversary of one of the jauhars, but no specific name has been given to it. It is generally believed that it commemorates Padmavati's jauhar, which is most famous. This festival is held primarily to commemorate the bravery of Rajput ancestors and all three jauhars which happened at Chittorgarh Fort. A huge number of Rajputs, who include the descendants of most of the princely families, hold a procession to celebrate the Jauhar. It has also become a forum to air one's views on the current political situation in the country.

Six forts of Rajasthan, namely, Amber Fort, Chittorgarh Fort, Gagron Fort, Jaisalmer Fort, Kumbhalgarh, and Ranthambore Fort were included in the UNESCO World Heritage Site list during the 37th meeting of the World Heritage Committee in Phnom Penh in June 2013. They were recognized as a serial cultural property and examples of Rajput military hill architecture.

The ruined city of the Cold Lairs from The Jungle Book by Rudyard Kipling, where the protagonist Mowgli is taken to after being kidnapped by the Bandar-log, is noted by the Kipling Society to have possibly been based on Chittorgarh Fort, which Kipling personally visited in 1887, and would have been relatively close to the Aravalli Range also located in Rajasthan, the original setting of the Jungle Books before Kipling changed it to the hills of Seoni in Madhya Pradesh.

== Gallery ==
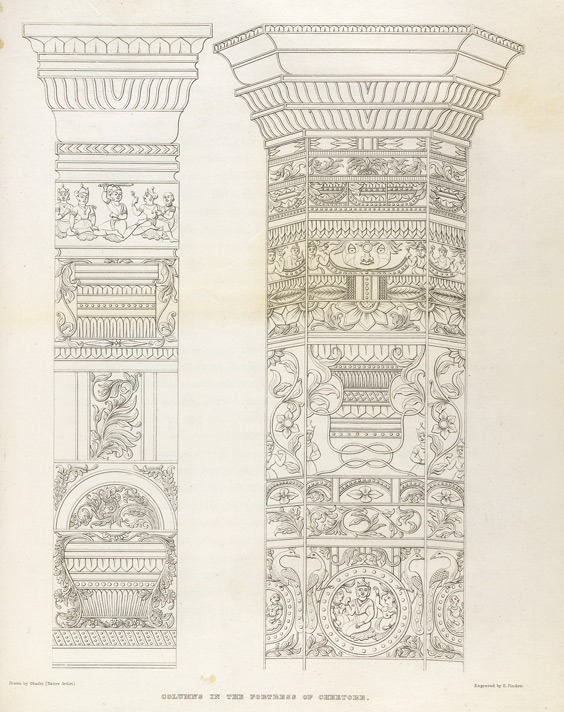
Columns in the fortress.

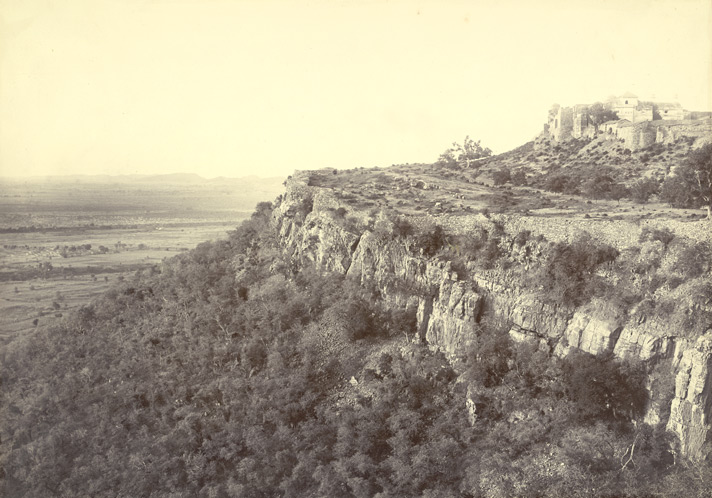
A part of the fortress.

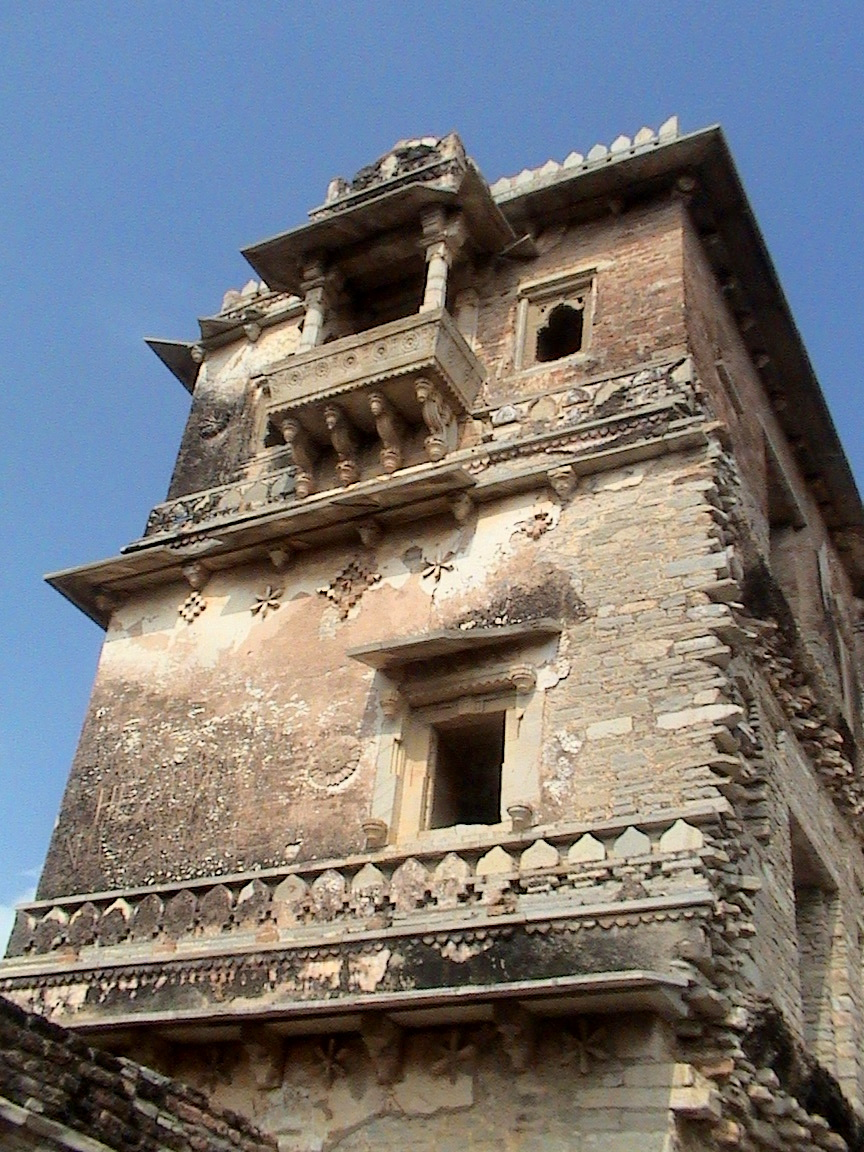
Fort remains 1

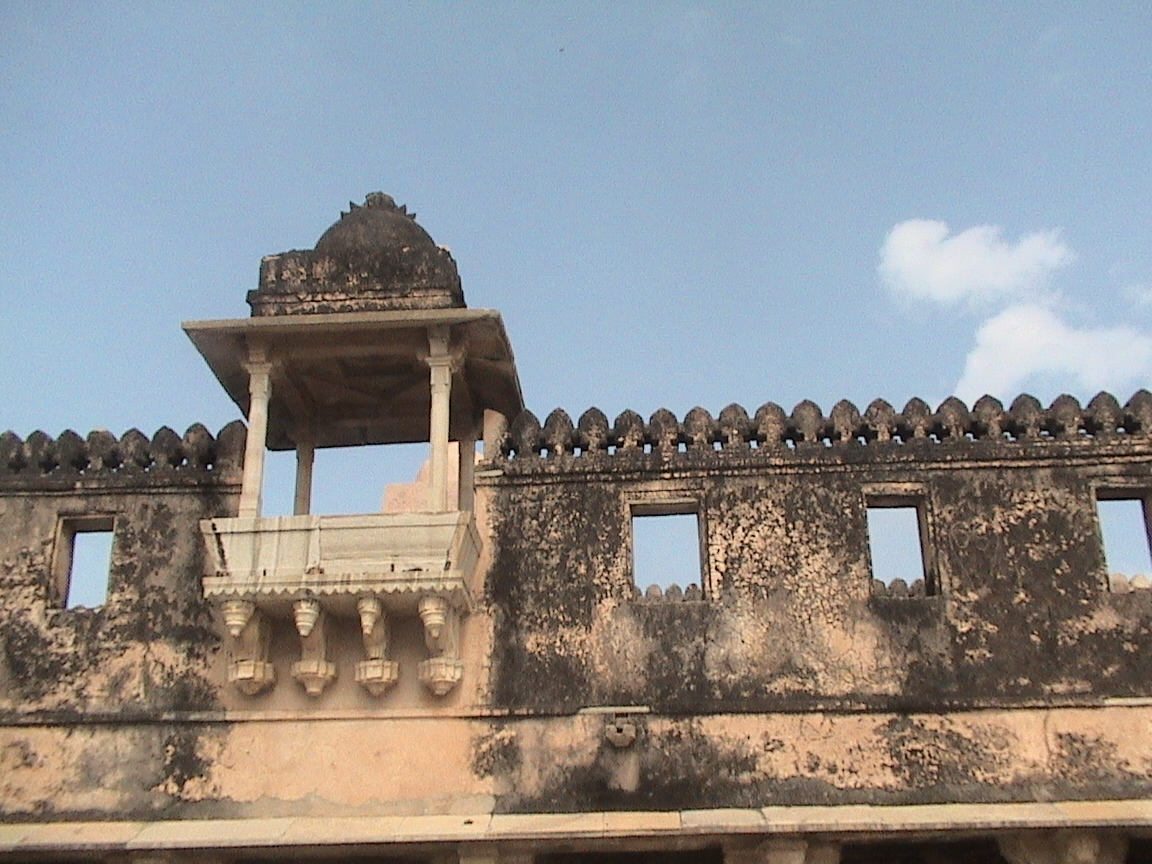
Fort remains 2

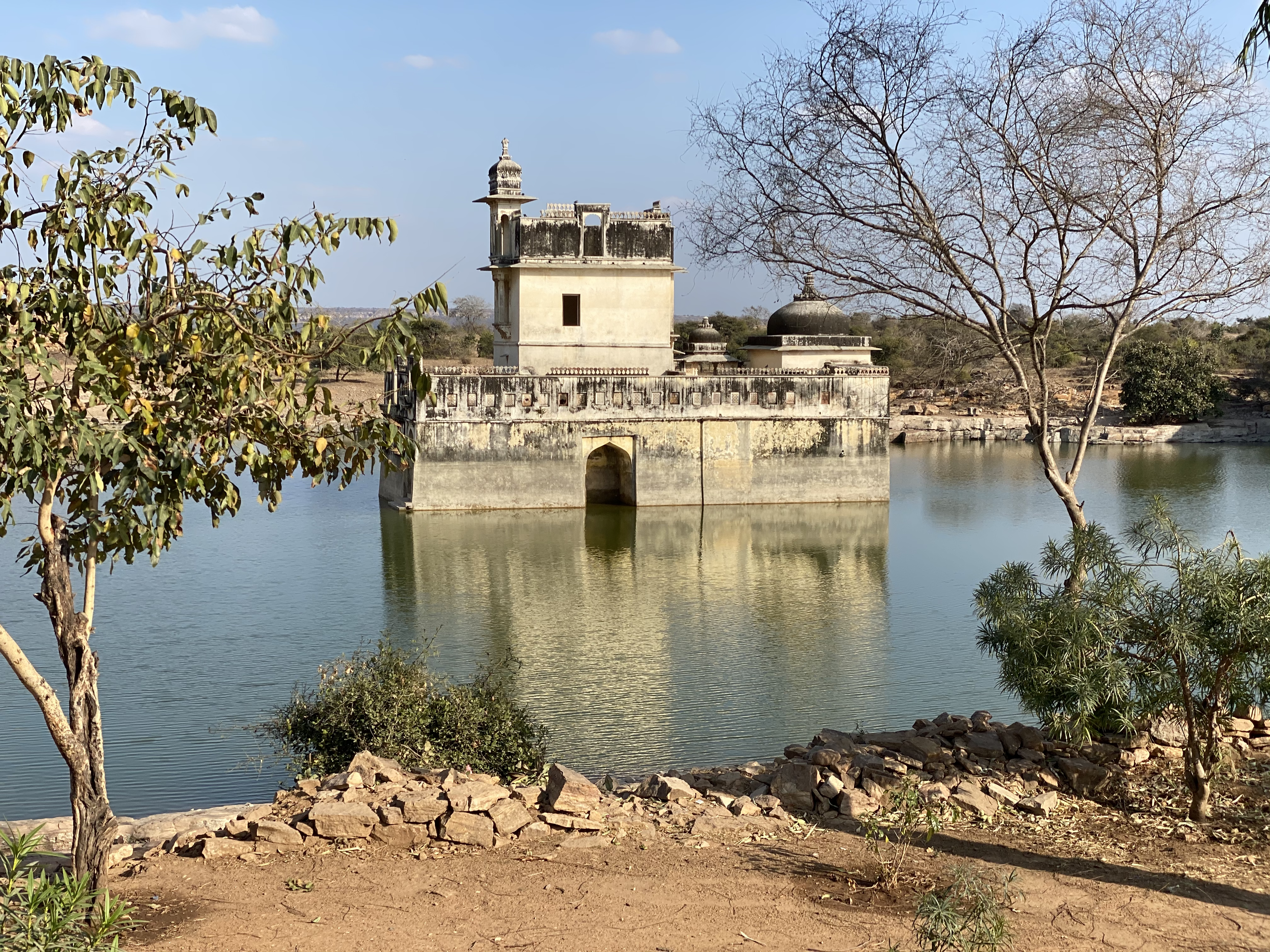
Padmini Palace

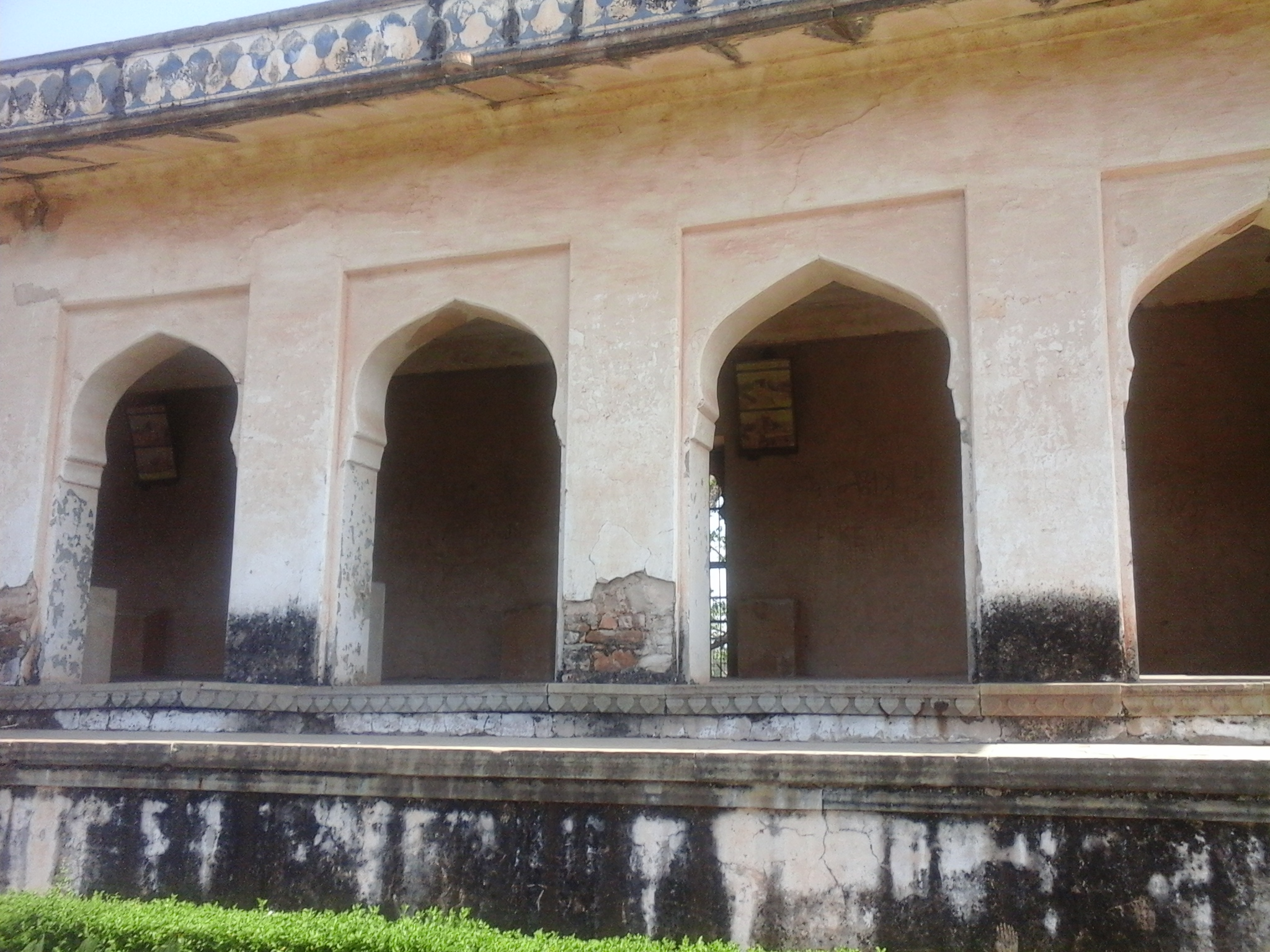
Interiors of the Padmini Palace.

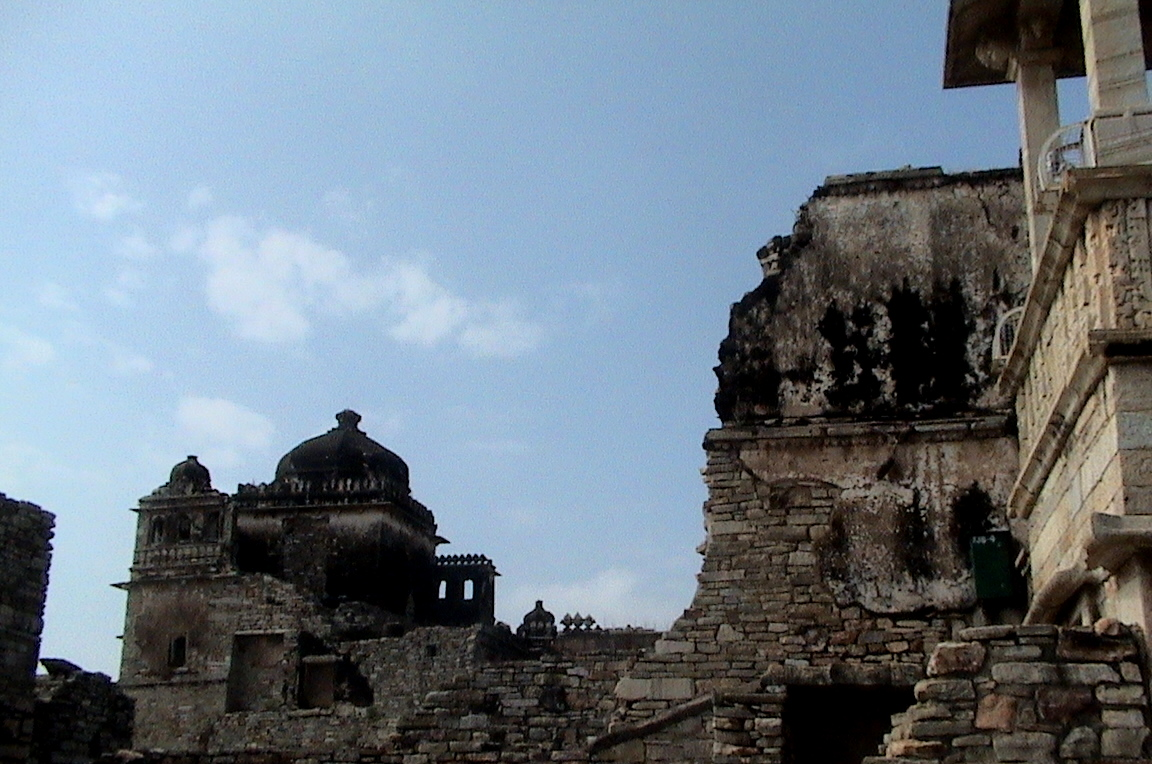
Structures in the fort 1

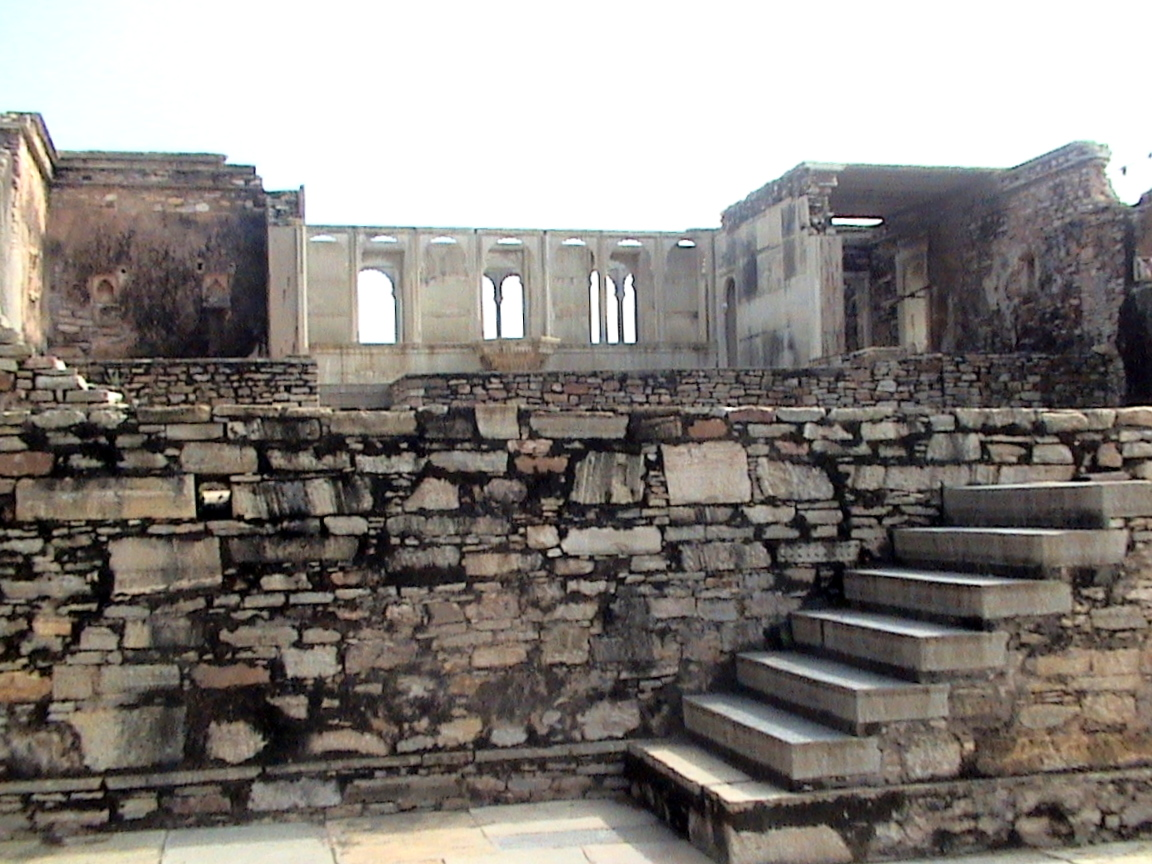
Structures in the fort 2

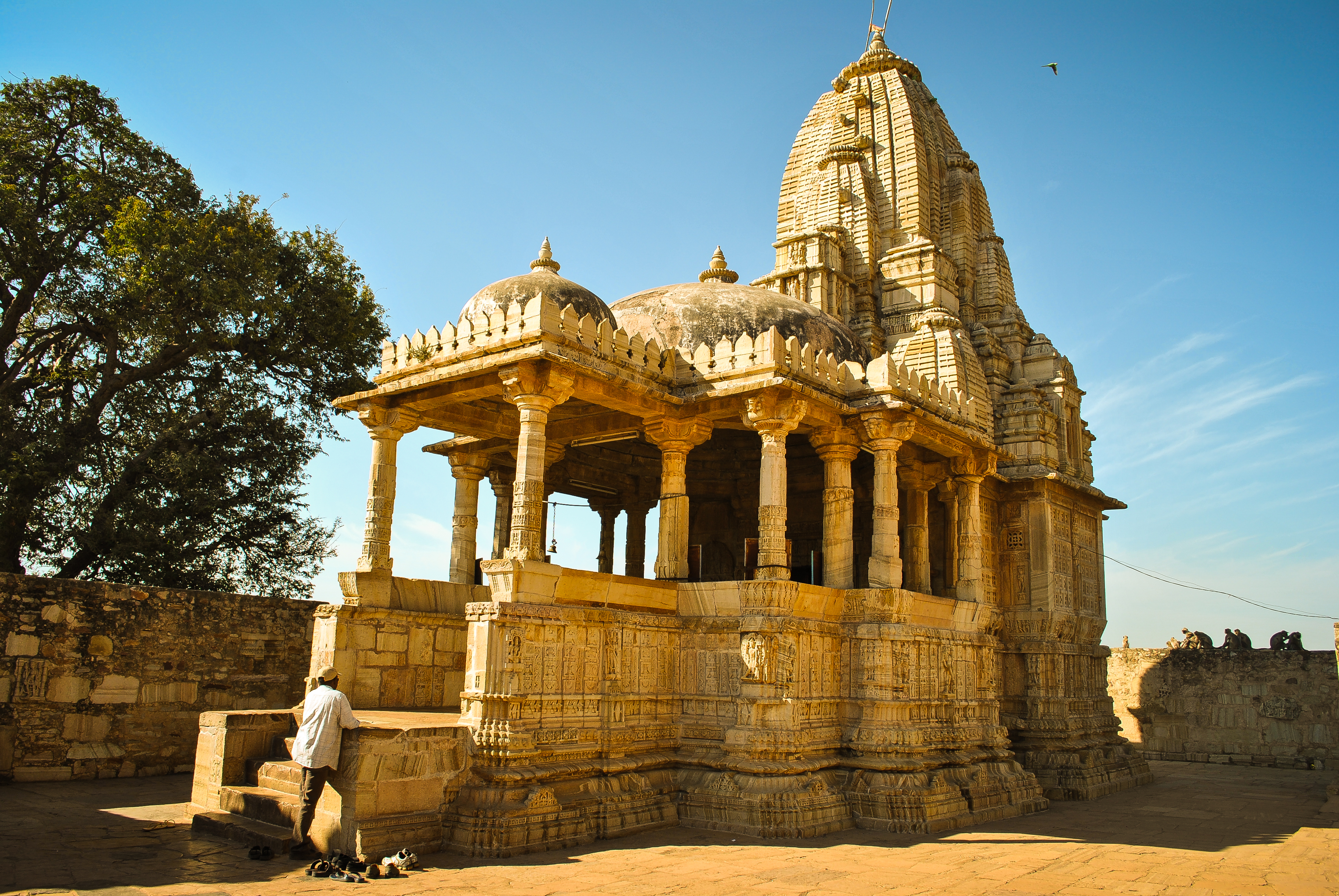
Meera Temple

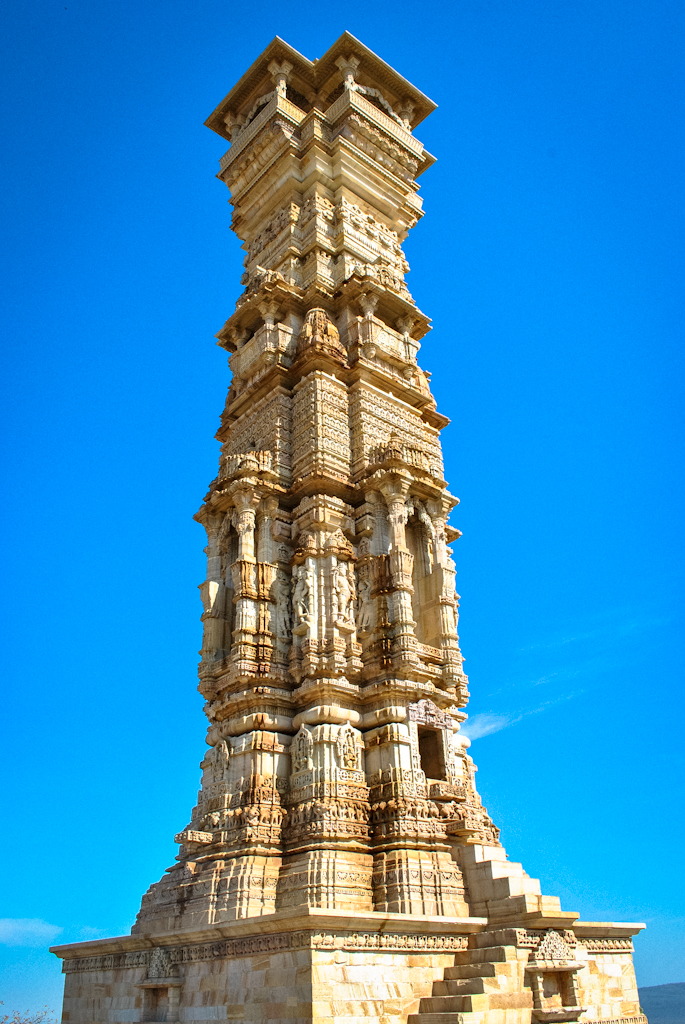
Kirti Stambha

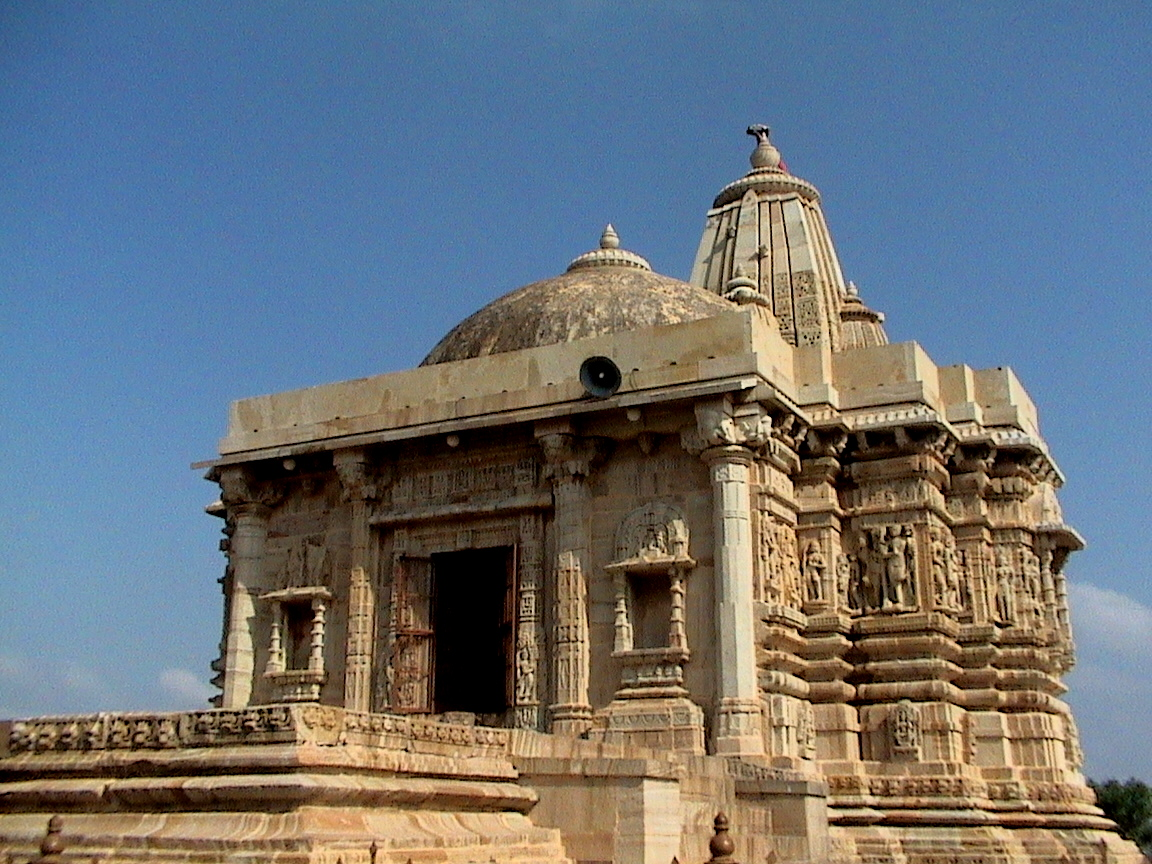
Jain temple at Kirtistambha

== See also ==
- Kumbha Shyam Temple, Chittorgarh
- Ravidas
- Mirabai
