= Kalika Mata Temple, Chittorgarh Fort =

Hindu temple in India

Coordinates: 24°52′52.4526″N 74°38′39.03″E

Kalika Mata Temple
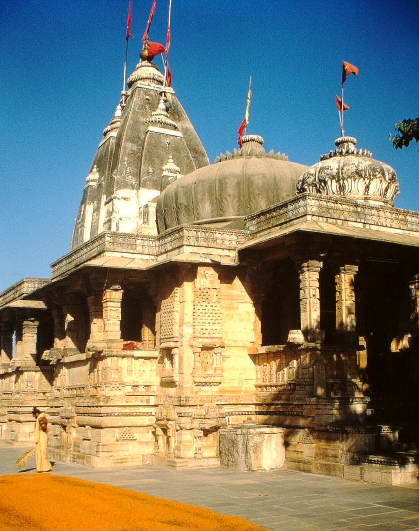

Religion
- Affiliation: Hinduism
- Deity: Bhadrakali
- Governing body: Devasthan Vibhag

Location
- Location: Chittor Fort, Chittorgarh, Rajasthan, India
- State: Rajasthan
- Country: India
- Interactive map of Kalika Mata Temple

Architecture
- Creator: Chitrangna Mori
- Established: 8th century

Website
- Instagram/@kalikamatachittor

Kalika Mata Temple is an 8th-century Hindu temple located within the Chittor Fort in the Chittorgarh municipality of Rajasthan state in India. It was originally a Sun temple which was partly destroyed in sack of Chittor, it was rebuilt during the time of Rana Kumbha. In the 14th-century, Maharana Lakshman Singh lighted a lamp called "Akhanda Jyoti". The goddess is worshipped by Gaur Rajputs as kuldevi. The goddess worshipped at this temple is an aspect of goddess Bhadrakali, also Known with a regional name "Chittodeshwari & Suryabharnini". clan goddess of Panwar (Mori Panwar) clan, The Mori Panwar Clan are the descendants of Chitrangna Mori, who built Chittorgarh. Bhadrakali Is also Worshipped as Isthdevi Of Sisodiya's and Purohit's. The upper part of the structure is relatively more recent. It is visited by thousands of visitors every day. Worship of goddesses is mainly done under the supervision of the Saints Of Akhada Shri Niranjani (Responsibility given by Maharana). Currently temple is managed by Devasthan Vibhag. In 2020, a new religious organisation "Chittor Bhakti Seva Trust" has been founded by Naveen Purohit for devotees of Bhadrakali. Chittor Bhakti Seva Trust started an informative page of temple on Instagram and Yashpal Singh Shaktawat is Currently Serving as President at Chittor Bhakti Seva Trust.
