= Chitrangada Mori =

Ruler of the Mori Kingdom in India

- Reign: 7th century
- Dynasty: Mori Kingdom
- Religion: Hinduism

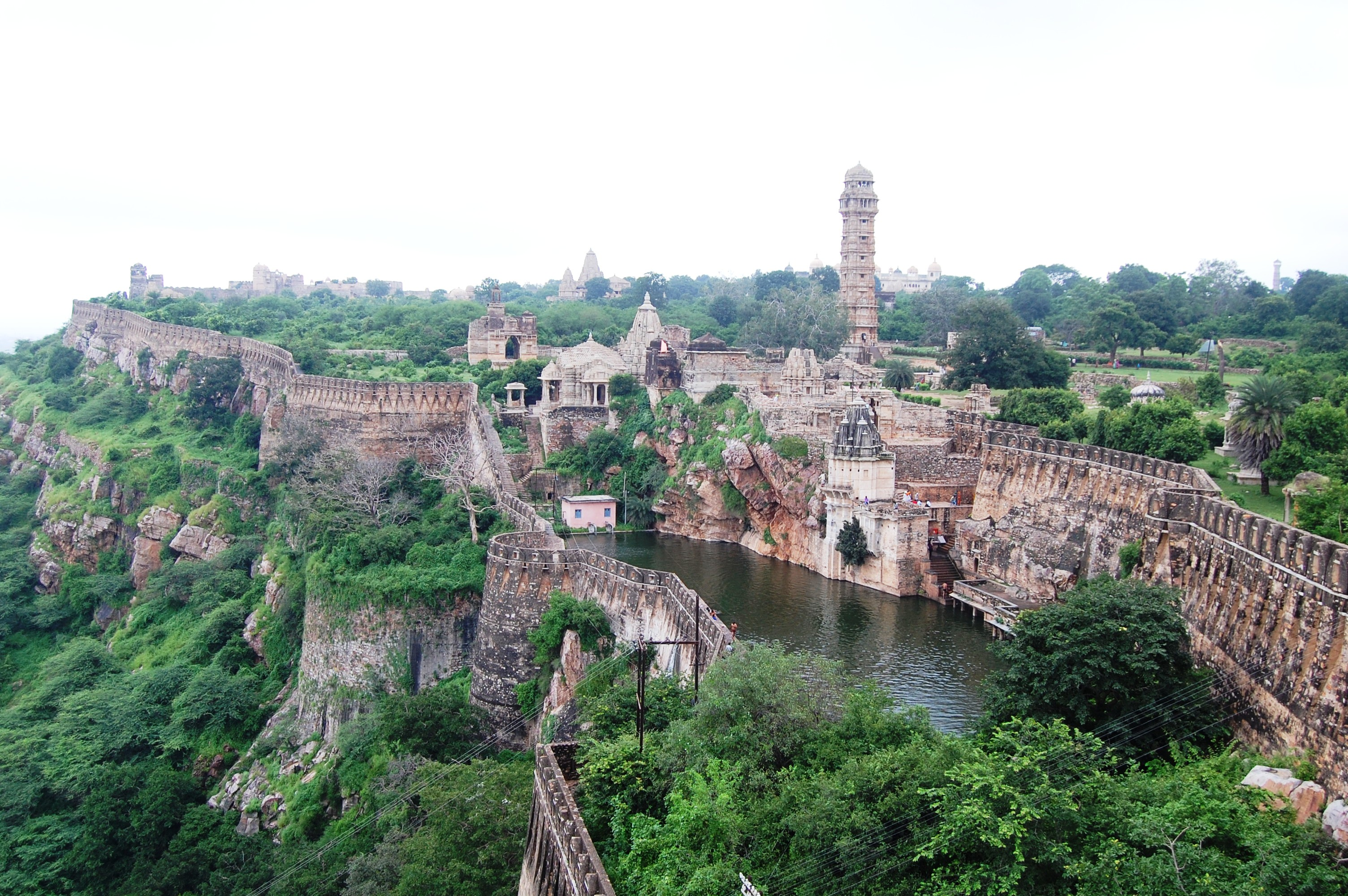
Chittorgarh fort, which was founded by Chitrangada Mori

Chitrangada Mori was a ruler of the Mori Kingdom.

Chitrangada Mori laid the foundation of his capital at Chittor Fort, which is the largest fort in India. He reigned in the 7th century AD, and the ruins of his palace still are present today. Chittorgarh was then known as Chitrakot, which changed to Chittorgarh in colloquial language.

Chitrangada Mori was possibly succeeded by Bappa Rawal, the Rajput ruler of Guhila dynasty after several conflicts with Arabs.

== See also ==
- Guhila dynasty
- Sisodias of Mewar
