= Kanswa =

Village in Rajasthan, India

Coordinates: 27°14′N 80°35′E

Kanswa Kansua
- City
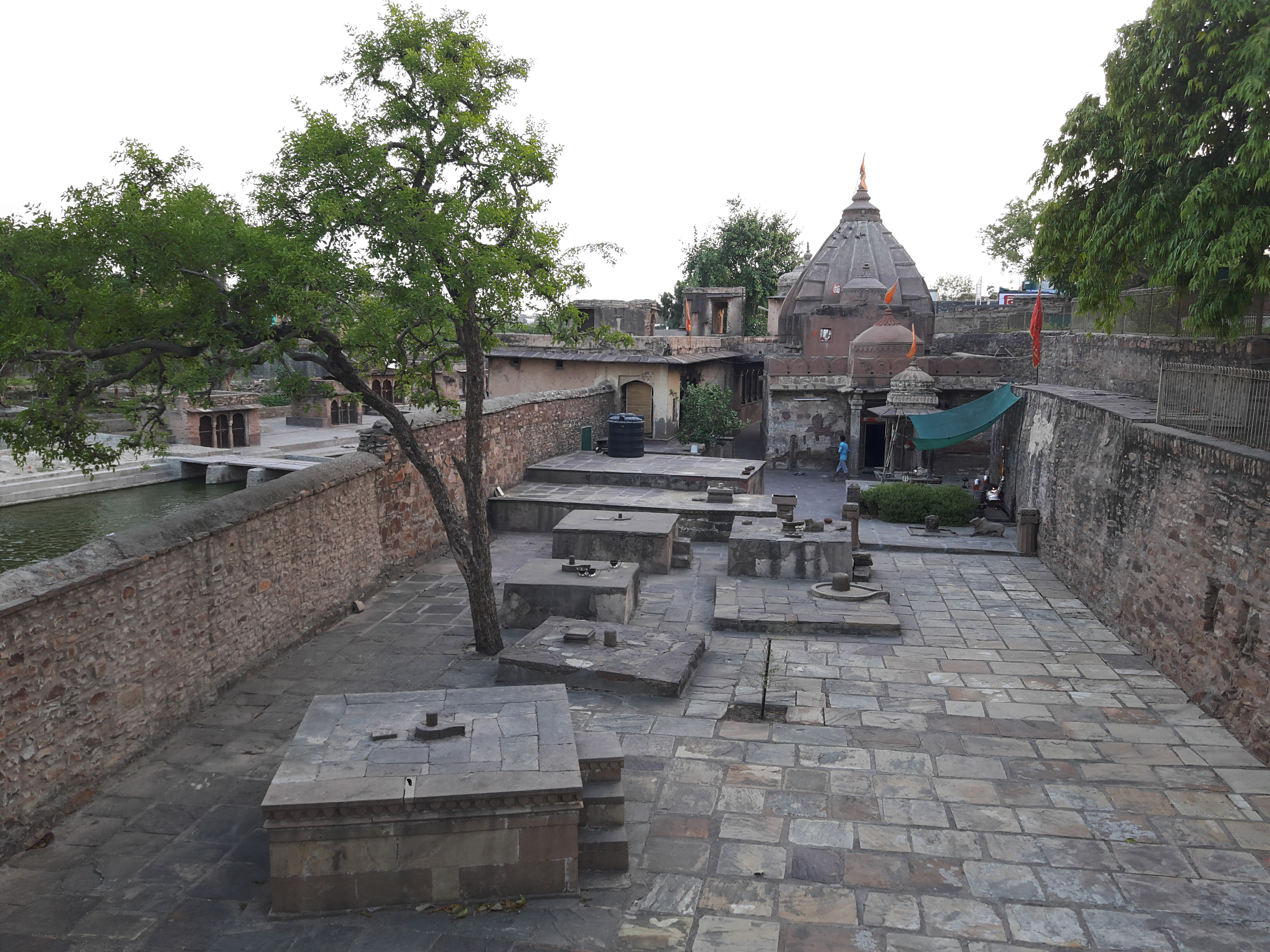
- Shiva temple at Kanswa
- Interactive map of Kanswa
- Country: India
- State: Rajasthan

Languages
  - Official: Hindi
- Time zone: UTC+5:30 (IST)
- ISO 3166 code: RJ-IN

Kanswa, also spelled Kansua, is a village in the Kota district of Rajasthan, India. It is of archaeological importance. It is the site where James Tod found an inscription in 1820 AD that reveals the rule of the Jat king Maharaja Shalinder in Kota region in 5th century AD.

There is a temple to Shiva here, located "in a scenic spot along the banks of a spring a few kilometers outside of Kota". An in situ inscription on the temple's wall, dated to 738 CE (VS 795), records the temple's construction and endowment by a private individual name Śivagaṇa. The inscription says that the temple was built on the site of the Kaṇvāśrama — that is, the ashram of the sage Kaṇva. The modern name Kansua is derived from this name Kaṇvāśrama. The inscription also mentions a ruler named Dhavala, who is likely the same person as the Dhavalappadeva mentioned in the Dabok stone inscription dated to c. 725 CE. Dhavala, however, does not seem to have played any role in the temple's founding.

The temple has been extensively rebuilt since its original construction, although some of the original elements are still present. There was probably originally a larger complex of smaller shrines, and possibly also a matha, around the main linga shrine, but stone walls now enclose a smaller area. Images of Lakulīśa placed in prominent locations suggest that the temple was once affiliated with the Pāśupata Shaiva sect.
