= Siege of Raisen (1532) =

Gujarat Sultanate's conquest of Raisen

- Ruins of Rani Mahal in the Fortress of Raisen
Date	18 January – 6 May 1532 (3 months, 2 weeks and 5 days)
Location	Raisen, Malwa (present-day Madhya Pradesh, India) 23°19′48″N 77°48′00″E
Result	Gujarat Sultanate victory
Territorial changes	Raisen, Ujjain, Bhilsa, Sarangpur, Gagron, Kanaur, Islamabad, Hoshangabad and Mandsaur annexed into Gujarat Sultanate

Belligerents
Gujarat Sultanate; Khandesh Sultanate	Purbiya Rajputs of Raisen

Commanders and leaders
Bahadur Shah; Miran Muhammad Shah Commanders: Mustafa Rumi Khan; Ikhtiar Khan; Imad-ul-Mulk; Muqbil Khan; Khudawand Khan; Mallu Khan; Darya Khan; Habib Khan; Alif Khan; Burhan-ul-Mulk; Malik Sher; Malik Amin Nasan; Alam Khan Jigat	Silhadi †; Lakshman Singh †; Taj Khan †

Strength
Large army 12,000 Deccani troops	Fort Garrison; 4,000 relief troops of Bhupat Rai

Casualties and losses
Unknown	Heavy; Silhadi, Lakshman Singh and many killed; approx. 700 women committed jauhar
- Location within Madhya Pradesh Siege of Raisen (1532) (India)

The Siege of Raisen (18 January – 6 May 1532) was a military campaign led by Sultan Bahadur Shah of Gujarat against the Rajput principality of Raisen in Malwa, ruled by the chieftain Silhadi.

Bahadur Shah and Silhadi had been on good terms. The Sultan granted him the territories of Ujjain, Sarangpur, Bhilsa and Raisen. Later, Bahadur Shah turned against him due to concerns over Silhadi's growing independence. The Sultan was also alarmed by Silhadi's friendly relations with Vikramaditya Singh of Mewar. Silhadi also seized many Muslim women in his harem which was taken as the pretext of the invasion. In January 1532, the Gujarati forces besieged Raisen. After four months of prolonged siege, Raisen was finally captured by Bahadur Shah. Silhadi and his brother Lakshman Singh were killed in the final fighting. Hundreds of Rajput women, led by Rani Durgavati, committed jauhar. The capture of Raisen brought the principality under Gujarat's control and completed Bahadur Shah's consolidation of Malwa.

== Background ==
Silhadi was granted jagir of Sarangpur, Ujjain and Raisen by Medini Rai. Taking advantage of Mahmud Khalji's weakness, he made himself independent occupying Bhilsa, Sarangpur and Raisen as the capital of his principality. He strengthened his position by marrying Rana Sanga's daughter Durgavati, a princess of the Sisodia dynasty of Mewar. During Bahadur Shah's invasion of Malwa, Mahmud Khalji II sought Silhadi's assistance. However, he defected to join Rana Ratan Singh, then Bahadur Shah. Impressed by his service, Sultan Bahadur granted him the Sarkar of Ujjain and confirmed his authority over Sarangpur, Bhilsa and Raisen. After the conquest of Malwa, Sultan Bahadur turned his attention towards Raisen. Despite earlier good relations with Silhadi, the Sultan of Gujarat was eager to expand his kingdom and eliminate potential dangers. In 1531–2, Silhadi demanded equal status with Muslim nobility at Bahadur Shah's court. When refused, he stopped attending the sultan and considered rejoining the Rana of Mewar. The growing friendliness between Silhadi and Vikramaditya Singh of Mewar, alarmed Bahadur Shah. To avoid an alliance, he decided to break the Rajput power, beginning with the conquest of Raisen.

Silhadi also kept Muslim women in his harem. Malik Nasan urged Bahadur Shah to inflict execution for this offence. Bahadur Shah repeatedly summoned Silhadi but the latter did not pay a visit. According to Nizamuddin Ahmad, Silhadi avoided the Sultan because he had taken Muslim women including members of Sultan Nasiruddin of Malwa during Mahmud Khalji's reign. Sikandar states that Bahadur Shah, enraged, decided to march against him. According to Dirk H. A. Kolff, medieval Muslim authors claimed that respectable Muslim women were forced to become dancing-girls enslaved by the Purbiyas. Some were also the daughters of local chiefs who depended on Silhadi for jobs and land; keeping them in his household raised his status. There were also real princesses from important families. Sultan Bahadur Shah decided it was his duty to free the Muslim women from the disgrace of kufr and kafirs' slavery.

== Prelude ==
Bahadur Shah sent Muqbil Khan to Muhammadabad-Champaner to summon Ikhtiar Khan with treasure and army. On 15 December 1531, he left Mandu for Nalchha, pretending to return to Gujarat. Silhadi's son Bhupat Rai, then in the Sultan's service, realized the plan and asked leave to persuade his father to submit and renew loyalty. Bahadur Shah granted the request and went hunting at Dipalpur where he was waiting for the main army. While hunting near Sadalpur (22°44′27.5″N 75°25′26.3″E) and Dipalpur, the main Gujarati forces reached Dhar. At Ujjain, Bhupat Rai persuaded Silhadi to meet the Sultan. Silhadi agreed, hoping to clear misunderstandings and regain favour. Leaving his son behind, he arrived at Sadalpur. The Sultan tried to settle the matter promising of a crore of tankas and the district of Cambay. No agreements were reached with Silhadi. Bahadur Shah ordered his arrest on 27 December 1531. Silhadi and two relatives were confined in Dhar fort. His camp was plundered and elephants seized. Most of his followers fled to Ujjain to inform Bhupat Rai about the incident. At Dhar, Ikhtiar Khan joined Sultan Bahadur with a large army, artillery and treasures. He dispatched Imad-ul-Mulk to check Bhupat Rai's advance. Bhupat Rai had already left Ujjain for Chittor. Imad-ul-Mulk occupied Ujjain. Bahadur Shah defeated the scattered forces of Silhadi and occupied the places. Sultan Bahadur set out from Dhar. On reaching Sadalpur he ordered Khudawand Khan to bring the main army and himself advanced to Ujjain. There Imad-ul-Mulk informed him of Bhupat's flight. Then the town of Astha was captured. Sultan Bahadur granted Ujjain to Darya Khan and Astha to Habib Khan as jagir. He then marched to Sarangpur and waited there for the main army. Leaving Mallu Khan in charge, he captured Bhilsa. A small force was left at Bhilsa and the Sultan marched to besiege Raisen.

== Siege ==
On 17 January 1532, Bahadur Shah encamped near Raisen. An immediate Rajput sortie against his camp was repelled and driven back into the fort. On the next day, 18 January 1532, Bahadur Shah besieged Raisen from all directions. Silhadi's brother Lakshman Singh was in charge of the fort's defence. The artillery captain, Mustafa Rumi, demolished a bastion but the garrison quickly repaired the breach. Bahadur Shah deployed 12,000 Deccani troops to explode mines at the fort's foundations, and after the breach was blown, he ordered assaults from all sides. Silhadi was worried watching these developments from the royal camp. Through some Muslim nobles, Silhadi offered to accept Islam and surrender the fort after its evacuation. According to Firishta, he renounced his faith and was named Salahuddin. Hajji-ud-Dabir records that he accepted Islam in Bahadur Shah's presence. Sir Denison Ross claims he only feigned conversion to conciliate the Sultan, but contemporary authorities state he had no such intention. Silhadi accompanied by Bahadur Shah tried to persuade his brother to surrender. Lakshman Singh, the garrison commander, came out and urged Silhadi not to accept Islam or abandon his gods Mahadev and Somnath. He added that Bhupat will soon arrive from Chittor with a strong relief force. Convinced, Silhadi asked the Sultan to let his brother re-enter the fort to arrange evacuation. Sultan Bahadur agreed. Lakshman promised to evacuate by morning. When the surrender was not complied the next day, Silhadi sought leave to inquire and was sent with some nobles. He secretly advised the garrison to repair the breaches. Enraged by this betray, Bahadur Shah ordered Burhan-ul-Mulk to take him to Mandu. Meanwhile Silhadi's son attacked the besiegers outpost at Parasia but was defeated and killed with his followers.

Bhupat Rai advanced with a strong army of 4,000. Bahadur Shah dispatched Miran Muhammad Shah of Khandesh and Imad-ul-Mulk to block him. At Parasia they learned that Rana Vikramaditya was also approaching with 40,000 to 50,000 troops, while Puran Mal moved from Kherad to join his brother Bhupat. To avoid being attacked from multiple sides, Bahadur Shah left Ikhtiar Khan to continue the siege and marched against Vikramaditya. He successfully repealed the Mewar advance. Rana Vikramajit then sent envoys on Silhadi's behalf and retreated with Bhupat Rai to Chittor. Bahadur Shah left Alif Khan to guard against any further move by the Rana and himself returned to Raisen.

By April 1532 the garrison lost hope. They offered to surrender if Silhadi were brought in person. Bahadu Shah was anxious to save the Muslim women from jauhar. On arrival Silhadi sought safety for the defenders. Lakshman Singh brought his family to the lower fortifications and appeared with several chiefs, explaining that Silhadi's chief consort Rani Durgavati and some 700 women would leave only with him. Bahadur Shah allowed Silhadi, accompanied by Malik Sher to enter the fort and bring them out. Inside to fort, Silhadi told his men the Sultan had offered him the Sarkar of Baroda in exchange for surrender. The Rajputs persuaded him to fight to death over the offer. Malik Sher was sent to report the decision. Immediately afterwards led by Rani Durgavati, 700 Rajput women committed jauhar. Muslim women were forced into the fire. Only a few escaped this. Enraged, Bahadur Shah ordered a full-scale assault. The Gujaratis breached the walls and stormed into the fort. Silhadi, Lakshman Singh and Taj Khan were killed with their followers. Raisen was captured on 6 May 1532.

== Aftermath ==
The capture of Raisen brought Ujjain, Bhilsa and Sarangpur under Gujarat's control. Miran Muhammad Shah captured Gagron and Kanaur (24°26′N 74°16′E). Islamabad, Hoshangabad, and Mandsur soon fell to Alp Khan. Sultan Alam, chief of Kalpi was appointed in Raisen. Imad-ul-Mulk Malikji and Ikhtiyar Khan were tasked to capture Mandsaur. The Rana's officer fled and it was taken too. Malik Ali Sher was appointed in charge of it.

== Bibliography ==
- Kolff, Dirk H. A. (2002-08-08). Naukar, Rajput, and Sepoy: The Ethnohistory of the Military Labour Market of Hindustan, 1450-1850. Cambridge University Press. ISBN 978-0-521-52305-9.
- Commissariat, M. S. (1938). A History of Gujarat. Vol. I. Ahmadabad: Longmans Green & Co. Ltd.
- Chaube, J. (1975). History of Gujarat Kingdom, 1458-1537. Munshiram Manoharlal Publishers. ISBN 978-0-88386-573-6.
- Haig, W. (1928). The Cambridge History of India: Turks and Afghans, edited by W. Haig. Vol. III. Cambridge University Press.
