= Bahadur Shah's conquest of Malwa =

1531 Gujarat Sultanate's military campaign

- Part of Gujarat–Malwa Wars
- Ruins of the Lal Mahal (Ruby Palace) in Mandu fort
| Date | January – 28 March 1531 |
| Location | Mandu, Malwa Sultanate 22°21′26.2″N 75°23′34.2″E |
| Result | Gujarat Sultanate victory: Fall of the Khalji dynasty of Malwa |
| Territorial changes | Territories of Malwa Sultanate annexed into Gujarat Sultanate |

Belligerents
| Gujarat Sultanate; Khandesh Sultanate; Purbiya Rajputs | Malwa Sultanate |

Commanders and leaders
| Bahadur Shah; Miran Muhammad Shah Others: Silhadi; Sikandar Khan; Delpat Rao; Prithviraj; Jagmal; Muhammad Shah Asiri; Ulugh Khan; Alif Khan; Lakshman Singh; Asaf Khan; Iqbal Khan; Shiraz-ul-Mulk; Alam Khan; Fateh Khan; Sharza Khan | Mahmud Khalji II; Habib Khan; Chand Khan |

Strength
| Large | Unknown |

Casualties and losses
| Heavy | Heavy |
- Location within Madhya Pradesh Siege of Mandu (India)

Bahadur Shah's conquest of Malwa was a military campaign fought in 1531 in which Bahadur Shah of the Gujarat Sultanate invaded and annexed the Malwa Sultanate, ruled by Mahmud Khalji II. The conquest ended the independent Khalji dynasty of Malwa and incorporated the region into the Gujarat Sultanate.

Tensions had grown after Mahmud Khalji gave asylum to Sultan Bahadur's brother Chand Khan and the Malwa forces attacked territories of Bahadur's ally, Rana Ratan Singh II of Mewar. In late January 1531 Bahadur Shah advanced into Malwa with a large army. After failed attempts at negotiation and the defection of several Malwa nobles, he laid siege to the capital fort of Mandu. On 28 March 1531 Gujarati forces captured the fortress. Mahmud Khalji surrendered but was later killed along with his sons while being escorted as a prisoner to Champaner.

Bahadur Shah had the Khutbah read in his name therefore formally annexing Malwa. He confirmed the local nobles in their holdings while appointing Malik Kalu as provincial faujdar. This marked the beginning of Gujarat Sultanate's rule in Malwa which lasted till Mughal emperor Humayun's invasion of Gujarat in 1536 AD.

== Background ==
Mahmud Khalji owed his restoration to the throne entirely to the help of Muzaffar Shah (r. 1511–1526). Because of this, Bahadur Shah considered him a vassal of Gujarat and expected his loyalty and support. However, all neighbouring rulers except Mahmud Khalji congratulated Bahadur Shah on his accession.

Later, Shahzada Chand Khan, Bahadur Shah's brother entered the service of Rana Sanga (r. 1509–1528) of Mewar. After Rana Sanga's defeat at the Battle of Khanwa in 1527, Chand Khan fled to Mandu and received asylum from Sultan Mahmud Khalji. Razi-ul-Mulk, a former noble of Muzaffar Shah approached Babur (r. 1526–1530) about installing Chand Khan in place of Bahadur. He then visited Chand Khan at Mandu before returning to Agra. When Bahadur Shah learned of this conspiracy, he wrote to Mahmud Khalji protesting against the shelter given to dissidents. Razi-ul-Mulk had again met Chand Khan in Mandu and then gone back to Agra, Bahadur Shah took offence and resolved to punish Mahmud Khalji.

Lastly, Rana Ratan Singh of Mewar maintained friendly relations with Bahadur Shah. Mahmud Khalji attacked Mewar territory. He sent Sharza Khan, the governor of Mandu, to recover lands lost to Rana Sanga after the Battle of Gagron in 1519. In retaliation, Rana Ratan Singh advanced as far as Sarangpur. He also informed Sultan Bahadur of these developments. Bahadur Shah demanded an explanation from Mahmud Khalji. This incident became one of the reasons for Sultan Bahadur's subsequent invasion of Malwa. Rana Ratan Singh was threatening to invade Ujjain. Mahmud Khalji was alarmed knowing two rulers were simultaneously moving towards Malwa. He therefore summoned Muin Khan, the governor of Satwas, and Silhadi Purbiya, the fief-holder of Raisen, to resist the threat. He failed to win their support. Both men deserted their sovereign to join Rana Ratan Singh. During Sultan Bahadur's short visit to Sambila they offered their submission to him and complained against Mahmud.

== Prelude ==
In late January 1531, Bahadur Shah set out to Malwa with a large army. The news greatly alarmed Mahmud Khalji. Alarmed by Bahadur Shah's advance, Mahmud Khalji sent Darya Khan to propose a personal meeting so that their differences could be settled amicably. He admitted his embarrassment at having sheltered Chand Khan. Bahadur Shah received the envoy but agreed to meet Mahmud near Karji Ghat on the Karkhai River. He assured him that the matter of Chand Khan had been overlooked and that he would not demand the prince's surrender. After dismissing the envoy, Bahadur continued his march to the banks of the Karkhi. Ratan Singh and Silhadi Purbiya came to pay their respects to the Sultan. Bahadur Shah received them warmly and presented the Rana with thirty elephants, many horses and fifteen hundred gold brocades. After a few days he granted Ratan Singh leave. Sikandar Khan, Silhadi, Delpat Rao, and Rao Bharmal of Idar and the Rajas of Vagad (Note: Vagad was divided into two parts. Prithviraj ruled Dungarpur (Northern Vagad) and his younger brother Jagmal ruled Banswara (Southern Vagad).) then joined Sultan Bahadur. The Sultan was still awaiting Mahmud Khalji. He proceeded to Sambila. Here Miran Muhammad Shah of Khandesh joined the Gujarati army. Prolonged waiting had exhausted the Sultan's patience. Sultan Mahmud possibly realised Bahadur Shah's true intentions and therefore decided not to visit his camp. Mahmud Khalji left Ujjain for Satwas on the pretext of punishing rebels, though his real purpose was probably to gather reinforcements. While hunting he fell from his horse and fractured his right arm, leaving him no choice but to return to Mandu. At last, another envoy arrived to inform Bahadur Shah about the accident as well as the Malwa Sultan's inability to meet in person. The Gujarati Sultan replied that he would himself go to Mandu to see Mahmud. Finally, the Sultan dismissed the envoy with instructions to inform Mahmud Khalji of his intended visit to Mandu.

== Siege of Mandu ==
Bahadur Shah marched to Dipalpur followed by Sudpur, where Shiraz-ul-Mulk, having left Mandu, joined him. Alam Khan and Fateh Khan also fled from Mandu and joined him. At Dhar, Sharza Khan the governor of Mandu joined the Gujarati forces. Bahadur Shah finally arrived at Nalcha on 9 March and from there began the siege of the fort. Bahadur Shah assigned his commanders to key positions around the fort. Muhammad Shah Asiri at the Shahpur gate, Ulugh Khan at Bhilpur, Alif Khan at the batteries of Bahlulpur, the Hindu batteries at Bahalwara, Lakshman Singh at Sitapur, and the remaining Purbiya Rajputs at Jutwara (Pahalwania). Having posted his generals at these strategic points, the Sultan established his own headquarters at Mahmudpur (Muhammadpur) to direct the siege in person. The besiegers opened fire with guns and muskets, while the garrison counter-attacked with heavy artillery and inflicted losses on the attackers. According to Nizamuddin Ahmad, Mahmud Khalji personally inspected the defences and supervised operations. Sultan Bahadur ordered his spies to locate the highest point of the fort. They reported that the Singar Chitori side presented a deep cliff and a very high wall. Believing the high wall at Singar Chitori would be poorly guarded, Bahadur decided to attack the fort from that side. While these preparations were under way, Mahmud Khalji withdrew into his seraglio, declaring to his well-wishers that, with his reign nearing its end, he wished only to enjoy life's pleasures. He deliberately neglected the defence, indulging in wine and women at the critical moment. Some nobles had been trying to defect to the Gujarati side. At night Bahadur Shah and a small party entered through unguarded Singar Chitori section. The guards were asleep. In the dawn the Gujarati soldiers attacked, shouting that Bahadur Shah had arrived. The guards became Panicked and fled. The main gate was thrown open. Habib Khan offered determined resistance but was forced to abandon his post. Roused from sleep, Mahmud Khalji rushed to help Habib Khan, but the sight of Bahadur panicked him and he fled back to his palaces with a thousand men. Prince Chand Khan fled to Goa. Mandu was captured on 28 March 1531.

== Death of Mahmud Khalji ==
Although Mahmud realised defeat is certain intended to kill the ladies of his harem so that they would not fall into enemy hands. Before he could act, Bahadur Shah's men surrounded the palace. Bahadur had sent a message of protection and safety to Mahmud and the women of the harem, even while ordering a general massacre and imprisonment of others inside the fort. Mahmud's nobles advised him to appear before Bahadur Shah who might restore Malwa to him. He accepted the proposal and appeared with seven sons. Bahadur received him cordially in the Lal Mahal. He wanted to restore Malwa to Mahmud. During conversation the Mahmud Shah spoke disrespectfully. Bahadur Shah allowed the amirs to withdraw, yet placed Mahmud and the seven sons under arrest. Alif Khan, Asaf Khan and Iqbal Khan were ordered to take the arrested to Champaner. On Friday 31 March 1531 the Khutbah was read in Bahadur Shah's name, formally announcing the annexation of Malwa to Gujarat. After a long journey the party halted for the night at Dohad on the Gujarat–Malwa border. Raja Udai Singh, a friend of Mahmud hearing the news wanted to free him. The Raja launched a night attack on the camp with 2,000 Kolis. Mahmud had just finished his prayers and was about to sleep when the clashes began. According to Firishta he managed to free his feet from the chains, but the guards, fearing an escape, immediately killed him. He was buried near Dohad. The fate of the seven princes is not known. It appears they too were killed. Thus, the Khalji dynasty of Malwa formally ended.

== Aftermath ==
Sultan Bahadur annexed Malwa to the Gujarat kingdom. Khutbah was read in his name in Mandu. He issued a proclamation guaranteeing safety to all Khalji nobles and ordered them to remain in their jagirs. Those who submitted were treated kindly and left in undisturbed possession of their fiefs. Having made Malwa a province of Gujarat, Bahadur divided it into districts and assigned them to local nobles. Unwilling to leave the entire administration in Khalji hands, he appointed Malik Kalu as faujdar of the province, making him its civil and military head. For his services Silhadi Purbiya was rewarded with Sarangpur, Ujjain, Bhilsa and Raisen. Muin Khan was allowed in his territory of Satwas.

== See also ==
- Siege of Mandu (1518)
- Battle of Gagron
- Alauddin Khalji's conquest of Malwa
- Muzaffar Shah's invasion of Malwa
- Mughal conquest of Malwa

== Bibliography ==
- Day, Upendra Nath (1965). Medieval Malwa: A Political and Cultural History, 1401-1562. Munshi Ram Manohar Lal. ISBN 978-81-215-0401-0.
- Chaube, J. (1975). History of Gujarat Kingdom, 1458-1537. Munshiram Manoharlal Publishers. ISBN 978-0-88386-573-6.
- Commissariat, M. S. (1938). A History of Gujarat. Vol. I. Ahmadabad: Longmans Green & Co. Ltd.
- Haig, W. (1928). The Cambridge History of India: Turks and Afghans, edited by W. Haig. Vol. III. Cambridge University Press.
