= Gujarat–Ahmadnagar War (1528–1530) =

1528–1529 campaigns in Deccan

Date	1528–1530
Location	Daulatabad, Ahmadnagar, and Berar region (present-day Maharashtra, India)
Result	Gujarat Sultanate victory
Territorial changes	Gujarat suzerainty in Baglana; Gujarat suzerainty in Ahmadnagar and Bidar

Belligerents
Gujarat Sultanate; Khandesh Sultanate; Kingdom of Baglana; Berar Sultanate	Ahmadnagar Sultanate; Bidar Sultanate; Bijapur Sultanate; Portuguese India

Commanders and leaders
Bahadur Shah; Miran Muhammad Shah; Aladdin Imad Shah; Baharji; Jam Feroz II; Narsinghdeo; Prithvi Raj; Muhibul-Mulk †; Mukhlis-ul-Mulk †; Khudawand Khan; Kaiser Khan; Mujahid Khan; Malik Amin; Alp Khan; Khudawand Khan	(Nizam Shahi dynasty) Burhan Nizam Shah I Amir Barid I (Nizam Shahi dynasty) Shaikh Jafar (Nizam Shahi dynasty) Kunwar Sen (Nizam Shahi dynasty) Khwaja Jahan (Nizam Shahi dynasty) Khairat Khan; Haidar-ul-Mulk Qazwini (Portuguese Empire) Lopo Vaz de Sampaio (Portuguese Empire) Joao de Avelar

Strength
100,000 cavalry 900 elephants Large naval fleet	Bidar: 6,000 troops Bijapur: 6,000 cavalry; later 500 cavalry Portuguese: 40 ships 1,000 troops

Casualties and losses
Heavy; 3,000 killed 70 camels captured 37 vessels captured	Heavy

The Gujarat–Ahmadnagar War (1528–1530) was two military conflicts between the Gujarat Sultanate, allied with the Berar and Khandesh Sultanates, and the Ahmadnagar Sultanate, allied with Bidar and Bijapur. The war was triggered by territorial disputes over Pathri and Mahur, which had been captured from Aladdin Imad Shah of Berar by Burhan Nizam Shah I of Ahmadnagar.

During 1528–1530, two major campaigns led by Bahadur Shah into the Deccan. Miran Muhammad Shah of Khandesh and Aladdin Imad Shah sought help of Bahadur Shah while Burhan Nizam Shah was joined by Amir Barid I of Bidar as well as reinforcements from Bijapur. The first expedition in 1528 led to an unsuccessful Gujarati siege of Daulatabad before two sides agreed peace treaty. Hostilities resumed in late 1529 after Burhan Nizam Shah refused to comply with the terms. In the second campaign in 1529, Bahadur Shah launched a two-front invasion. A naval assault targeting Chaul failed due to Portuguese intervention near Bombay. The Gujarati land forces successfully captured and devastated the Nizam Shahi capital of Ahmadnagar. Following further engagements near Burhanpur and the capture of Bidar, Burhan Nizam Shah sued for peace.

Under the resulting peace agreement, Burhan Nizam Shah agreed to recognize Bahadur Shah's suzerainty, read the Khutbah and strike coins in his name, and restore Pathri and Mahur to Berar. However, following Bahadur Shah's departure from the Deccan, Burhan Nizam Shah did not hand over the promised territories, controlled Pathri and Mahur until Ahmadnagar formally annexed the entire Berar Sultanate in 1572.

== Background ==
Malik Hasan Bahri was the founder of the Nizam Shahi dynasty of Ahmadnagar. His father, Bhairon a Kulkarni Brahmin was born in Pathri. It was under the domain of Imad Shahi dynasty of Berar. The inhabitants of Pathri requested Burhan Nizam Shah to take control of the town. In response, he attempted to negotiate an exchange of the ancestral district of the Nizam Shahi rulers with Aladdin Imad Shah. The latter not only rejected the offer but began strengthening the town's defences. In 1518, Burhan Nizam Shah launched an attack, seized Pathri, and annexed it to the Ahmadnagar Sultanate. Muhammad Ghori was appointed to govern it. This action sparked war between Burhan Nizam Shah of Ahmadnagar and Imad-ul-Mulk of Berar. Imad Shah formed a marriage alliance with Ismail Adil Shah of Bijapur Sultanate. The allied Berar and Bijapur army expelled the Nizam Shahi garrison from Pathri. In 1526, Burhan Nizam Shah allied with Amir Barid I advanced against Imad Shah. He recaptured Pathri and advanced as far as Berar's capital Ellichpur. After a six-month siege he captured Mahur. Unable to resist Nizam Shahi encroachment, Imad Shah appealed for assistance to Miran Muhammad Shah Farooqui of Khandesh. Miran Muhammad Shah then asked his uncle Bahadur Shah of Gujarat to mediate and end the hostilities. Bahadur Shah dispatched Ain-ul-Mulk who mediated peace between Ahmadnagar and Berar. After his departure, Burhan Nizam Shah again attacked Berar. Imad Shah informed Miran Muhammad Shah Farooqui of the unprovoked attack on Berar. Miran brought 25,000 troops to support Imad Shah. The combined army was defeated in battle by Burhan Nizam Shah who captured their baggage, artillery and 300 elephants. Imad Shah fled to Khandesh. Miran then wrote to his maternal uncle Bahadur Shah pleading for help against further Nizam Shahi expansion. Imad Shah sent a similar appeal to the Sultan of Gujarat. Sultan Bahadur decided to intervene. He sought to help against Ahmadnagar aggression also establish his authority over the Deccan sultanates.

== First campaign ==
In 1528, Sultan Bahadur Shah assembled 100,000 cavalry and 900 elephants, advancing towards the Deccan. He marched enroute Halol and reached Baroda, where he learned that the territories of Berar had suffered further invasions. For the next month he organized army for the expedition. During this period Jam Firuz II of Sindh, Narsinghdeo, nephew of Raja Man Singh of Gwalior and Prithvi Raj, nephew of Rana Sanga joined his camp. Aladdin Imad Shah sent his son Jafar Khan to ask the Sultan for immediate help. Bahadur Shah reached the banks of the Narmada River where Miran Muhammad Shah warmly welcomed him. At his nephew's request the Sultan paid a brief visit to Burhanpur, where Imad Shah also joined them. After a short stay the three sultans advanced against Ahmadnagar. According to Firishta, Burhan Nizam Shah was so panicked that he offered terms of peace, but the allies rejected them. They pressed on and reached the fort of Galna. The combined armies then continued their march and arrived near Daulatabad.

=== Siege of Daulatabad ===
The arrival of Bahadur Shah near Daulatabad greatly alarmed the Nizam Shahi commanders. They planned to avoid a siege of the fort until sufficient supplies and reinforcements could arrive from Ahmadnagar. The garrison commander informed Burhan Nizam Shah and despatched a detachment to engage the invading army's vanguard. The Nizam Shahi forces launched a sudden ambush. Bahadur Shah's timely arrival saved the situation, and the Nizam Shahi troops were routed. The Gujarati army suffered heavy casualties. Three of its prominent generals Muhib-ul-Mulk, Mukhlis-ul-Mulk and the latter's son were killed. Bahadur Shah then proceeded to besiege Daulatabad. Burhan Nizam Shah sent an envoy to open peace negotiations to gain time while he sought external military aid to neighbouring states. He wrote a congratulatory letter to Babur, begging either active assistance or at least a formal declaration of suzerainty that might deter the allies. He also sought help of Ismail Adil Shah of Bijapur, Amir Barid I of Bidar and Quli Qutb Shah of Golconda. Babur had just newly founded empire and was no position to offer help. He remained silent. The neighbouring Deccan Sultans likewise offered no assistance. Burhan despatched another ambassador to Bahadur Shah request a ten-day truce for final settlement. The Gujarati Sultan granted the delay. In the meantime, Amir Barid arrived with 6,000 troops, while Ismail Adil Shah sent another force of 6,000 troops. Burhan now resolved neither to appear in person before Bahadur Shah nor to seek any further extension of time. After the expiry of the period, Bahadur Shah, enraged by the defiance, ordered a full-scale assault on the fort from every side. The allied army besieged vigorously for twenty days with no results. Exhausted and disappointed at the lack of quick success, Bahadur Shah raised the siege and marched towards Bidar.

=== First peace treaty ===
Burhan Nizam Shah, Amir Barid, Ismail Adil Shah and Khudawand Khan (Note: Khudawand Khan was the Imad Shahi governor of Mahur. Not to be confused with Malik Alim Khudawand Khan, Vizier of Gujarat Sultanate) sent envoys to Bahadur Shah's to sue for peace. They argued that Imad Shah had committed the first offence by seizing Mahur from the Nizam Shahis. Burhan had merely gone to war to avenge that injury. They declared themselves ready to accept whatever terms were offered. Muzaffar Shah also faced various difficulties. The rainy season was approaching, endangering his lines of communication and provisions. The prolonged and unsuccessful siege of Daulatabad had convinced him that the conquest of Ahmadnagar would not be easy. Bahadur Shah therefore decided to conclude peace and return home. The principal terms were as follows:

1. Burhan Nizam Shah to cede Mahur and Pathri to Imad Shah.
2. Restored all the elephants, horses and baggage that Miran Muhammad Shah and Imad Shah had lost in 1526.
3. According to Firishta, he also consented to have the Khutbah recited in Bahadur Shah's name and promised to pay tribute.

Bahadur Shah began his return march, leaving Miran Muhammad Shah behind to ensure that the terms were carried out. He reached his capital in April 1529 AD. The treaty proved to be a diplomatic success for Burhan Nizam Shah.

== Second campaign ==
Bahadur Shah's departure showed Burhan Nizam Shah's real intention regarding the terms of the treaty. Miran Muhammad Shah was anxious to return to his own capital before the rainy season. He therefore pressed only for the restoration of his own elephants, horses and equipment. Burhan restored to the ruler of Khandesh everything that had been asked for him. Satisfied, Miran Muhammad Shah withdrew to his capital leaving Imad shah isolated and helpless. Therefore, Burhan Nizam Shah did not restore Mahur and Pathri to Imad Shah. Imad Shah left with no choice again sought help from Bahadur Shah. In September 1529 AD, he sent his son, Jafar Khan, to Ahmedabad to report on the situation in the Deccan. The prince informed the Sultan that Burhan Nizam Shah had neither restored the elephants nor surrendered the towns of Mahur and Pathri. Bahadur Shah was enraged hearing the defiance. To restore his prestige and assert his supremacy over Ahmadnagar, he resolved to lead another expedition against Burhan Nizam Shah.

On 6 September 1529, Sultan Bahadur Shah left for the Deccan. After a long march Bahadur Shah crossed Dabhoi and advanced by regular stages to Dharvali. There Miran Muhammad Shah and Imad Shah joined him. The three rulers conferred and agreed to march through Baglana. In 1499, Ahmad Nizam Shah forced the chief of the kingdom of Baglana to pay him tribute; thereafter the principality remained a tributary of the Ahmadnagar kingdom. Bahadur Shah wanted to subjugate it to weaken Burhan Nizam Shah's power. Shortly after the Sultan entered Baglana, Baharji titled Bahram Shah offered submission. He then accompanied Bahadur Shah to the fortress of Salher.

=== Battle of Chaul ===
Muzaffar Shah planned a two-frontier assault on Nizam Shahi territory. He despatched a naval squadron, supported by a land force under Baharji, to capture the port of Chaul, while he himself prepared to march on Ahmadnagar. His intend to cut off military assistance of Nizam Shahis from the Portuguese through Chaul. Lopo Vaz de Sampaio, the Portuguese governor, promptly answered Burhan's appeal for aid and set sail with 40 vessels on sea. Joao de Avelar followed on land with 1,000 troops. The Gujarati naval commander, finding himself unable to face the enemy, retreated hastily towards Diu. The Portuguese pursued him closely and defeated the Gujarati near Bombay. They captured 37 vessels. A large number of Gujarati soldiers were taken prisoner. They further captured a fort which they then handed over to Burhan Nizam Shah. The attack on Chaul thus ended in complete failure.

=== Gujarat capture of Ahmadnagar ===
Muzaffar Shah's march to Ahmadnagar alarmed Burhan Nizam Shah who sought help of Golconda, Bijapur and Bidar for immediate assistance. Amir Barid responded arriving with a strong body of cavalry. Ismail Adil Shah of Bijapur could only send a contingent of 500 cavalry under Haidar-ul-Mulk Qazwini. Meanwhile, Sultan Bahadur Shah captured Mahur and Pathri and marched towards Ahmadnagar. Amir Barid and Burhan Nizam Shah twice defeated the Gujarati forces between Paithan and Bir. In the first battle the allied army lost 3,000 troops and 70 camels laden with treasure fell into enemy hand. Bahadur Shah receiving news, sent his Wazir Khudawand Khan with 20,000 cavalry. He suffered defeat in the second engagement. Bahadur Shah despatched a third detachment under Imad Shah, who forced Amir Barid and Burhan Nizam Shah to fall back on Paranda and Junnar. Nizam Shahi capital Ahmadnagar, was left undefended. Sultan Bahadur entered the city unopposed and occupied the royal palace. He ordered his troops to demolish its structures. After remaining in the capital for forty days, he sent Imad Shah with a strong force to besiege the fort of Ahmadnagar. Malik Amin was dispatched to plunder Paranda and Mujahid Khan to conquer the fort of Ausa. Burhan Nizam Shah appointed Khwaja Jahan to defend the city but failed to stop from sacking. The severe devastation forced Burhan Nizam Shah to replace Shaikh Jafar with Kunawar Sen as Peshwa. Burhan Nizam Shah collected troops from Junnar and Ahmadnagar took up positions in the hilly country around Daulatabad, within eight miles of the Gujarati camp. Kunwar Sen tried to distract Bahadur Shah's attention by invading Asirgarh and Burhanpur in Khandesh which would force the Sultan to abandon Ahmadnagar. Bahadur Shah receiving information about the Nizam Shahi advance into Khandesh, immediately despatched Kaiser Khan and Miran Muhammad Shah to defend Khandesh. They reached Burhanpur where they met the invading forces. The two armies faced each other for more than three months. Kunwar Sen's forces were defeated near Burhanpur after skirmishes and night attacks. The Gujarati army suffered severely from famine, which forced Bahadur Shah to leave Ahmadnagar. He then marched on Daulatabad. Khairat Khan the commandant of the fort tried to resist Bahadur Shah but failed. In the meantime, Pathri had been recovered by Burhan. Muzaffar Shah laid siege to the fort but, finding it difficult to reduce, left Alp Khan to assist Alauddin Imad Shah and himself marched once more towards Daulatabad to press the siege more vigorously. The Gujarati army sacked the town.

== Peace treaty ==
After the defeat near Burhanpur, Amir Barid made peace with Imad Shah by offering his daughter in marriage and submitted to Bahadur Shah. He accepted Muzaffar Shah's suzerainty, reading the Khutbah and issuing coins in his name.

Amir Barid's desertion left Burhan Nizam Shah isolated and exhausted by the long war. With core territories plundered and their buildings destroyed, he wisely sought peace through Miran Muhammad Shah's mediation. Bahadur Shah, facing heavy naval losses near Bombay and other difficulties, also desired a settlement. Miran Muhammad Shah mediated peace between the two monarchs. Bahadur Shah concluded a peace treaty with Burhan Nizam Shah as follows:

1. Burhan Nizam Shah would read Khutbah and strike coins in the name of Bahadur Shah.
2. He would acknowledged Bahadur Shah as the sovereign of Gujarat and Ahmadnagar and accepted the status of a vassal.
3. Pathri and Mahur would be ceded to Berar.

== Aftermath ==
The Sultan accompanied by Miran Muhammad Shah, Barid Shah and Imad Shah, reached Burhanpur in 1529–1530 AD. He met with Burhan Nizam Shah near Daulatabad. After Bahadur Shah's departed Burhan Nizam Shah abandoned his submissive stance and refuse Imad Shah's demand to restore Mahur and Pathri. It remained under Nizam Shahi control until Berar was annexed to Ahmadnagar in 1572. Subsequently, Bahadur Shah refrained from actively interfering in Deccan affairs. Burhan Nizam Shah captured thirty Maratha forts as well as Galna and Malher. Bahadur Shah sent Muhammad Khan Farooqui against him and later advanced himself. The allies defeated Burhan and forced him to make peace.

Fearing retribution for unfulfilled treaty terms, Burhan Nizam Shah sent Shah Tahir to Gujarat in 1531. Shah Tahir eventually won Bahadur Shah's favour through his intellect. Alarmed by Bahadur Shah's annexation of Malwa, Burhan sent Shah Tahir and Nasru Pandit to congratulate him. Advised by Miran Muhammad Shah on the strategic need for unity against the rising Mughals, Bahadur Shah received the envoys and requested a personal meeting. In 1532, Burhan Nizam Shah met Bahadur Shah at Burhanpur. The Sultan received him warmly, bestowed upon him the title of "Shah", a royal canopy from Malwa, and other gifts. In return, Burhan Nizam Shah acknowledged Bahadur Shah's suzerainty and agreed to have the Khutbah read in his name before both monarchs returned home.

== Bibliography ==
- Chaube, J. (1975). History of Gujarat Kingdom, 1458-1537. Munshiram Manoharlal Publishers. ISBN 978-0-88386-573-6.
- Shyam, Radhey (1966). The Kingdom of Ahmadnagar (1st ed.). Delhi: Motilal Banarsidass.
- Sherwani, Haroon Khan (1973). History of Medieval Deccan, 1295-1724: Mainly political and military aspects. Copies can be had from Director of Print. and Publication Bureau, Government of Andhra Pradesh.
- Commissariat, M. S. (1938). A History of Gujarat. Vol. I. Ahmadabad: Longmans Green & Co. Ltd.
