= Sikandar Shah (disambiguation) =

Sikandar Shah may refer to:

- Sikandar Shah, Sultan of Bengal (1358-1390)
- Sikandar Shah Miri (var. Sikandar Butshikan), Sultan of Kashmir (1389-1413)
- Sikandar Khan Lodi, Shah of the Lodi empire (1489-1517)
- Nuruddin Sikandar Shah, Sultan of Bengal (1481)
- Sikandar Shah, ruler of Gujarat Sultanate (1526)
- Sikandar Shah Suri, Sur dynasty, Shah of Delhi (1555)
- Min Phalaung Sikandar Shah, Mrauk U King of Arakan (1572-1593)
