= Bahadur Shah of Gujarat =

Sultan of Gujarat from 1526 to 1535 and from 1536 to 1537

Bahadur Shah
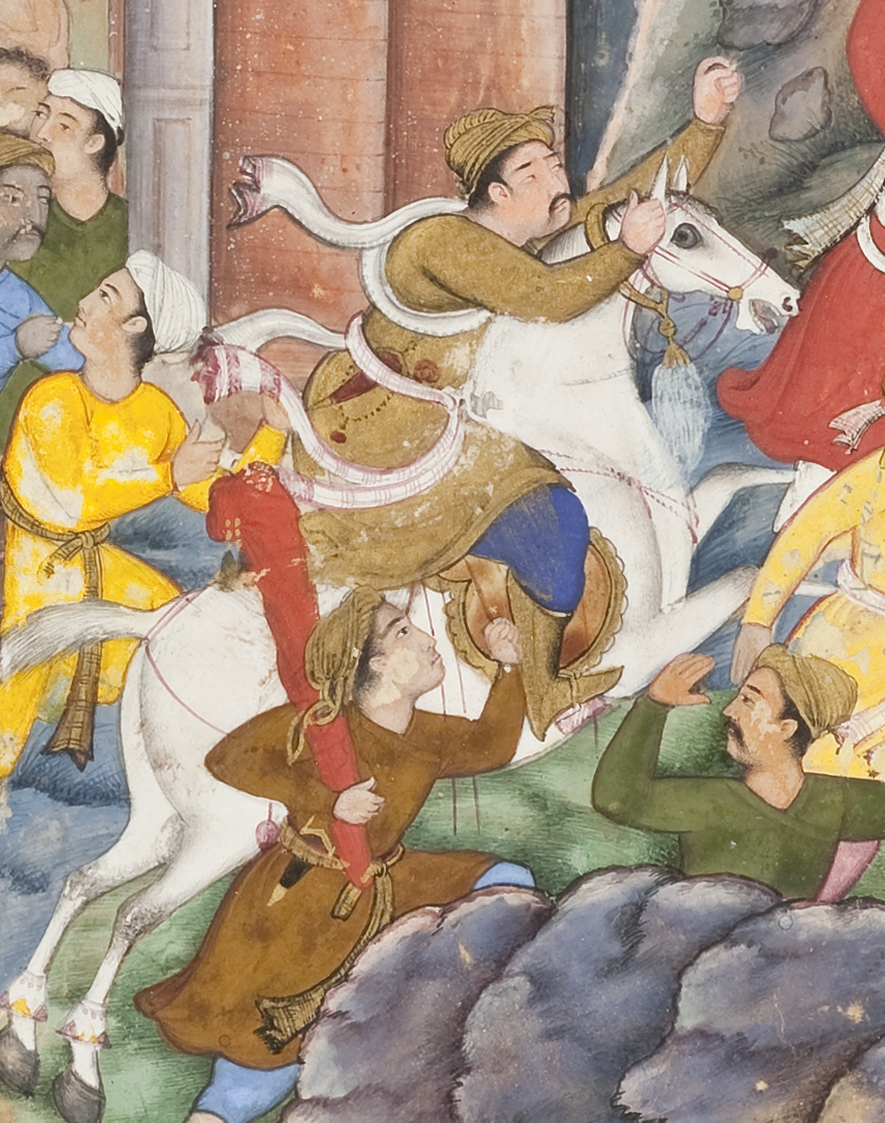
- Sultan Bahadur fleeing from the Fort of Cambay in 1535

Sultan of Gujarat
- Reign: 22 August 1526 – 25 April 1535
- Predecessor: Mahmud Shah II
- Successor: Hindál Mírza (as Mughal Governor of Gujarat)
- Reign: 1536 – 13 February 1537
- Predecessor: Hindál Mírza
- Successor: Miran Muhammad Shah I (died before coronation); Mahmud Shah III

Sultan of Malwa
- Reign: 28 March 1531 – 25 April 1535
- Predecessor: Mahmud Khilji II
- Successor: Hindal Mirza (as Mughal Governor of Gujarat)
- Reign: 1536 – 13 February 1537
- Predecessor: Hindal Mirza
- Successor: Miran Muhammad Shah I (died before coronation); Qadir Shah
- Died: 13 February 1537; On board ship, near Diu, Arabian Sea
- Spouse: Sister of Raja Baharji of Baglan; Daughter of Jam Feroz II
Names
- Qutb-ud-Din Bahadur Shah
- Dynasty: Muzaffarid
- Father: Muzaffar Shah II
- Mother: Rani Lakshmi Bai
- Religion: Sunni Islam
- Military career
- Service years: c. 1426–1537
- Conflicts: Gujarat–Ahmadnagar War (1528–1530); Conquest of Malwa (1531); Siege of Raisen (1532); Siege of Chittorgarh (1535)

Qutb-ud-Din Bahadur Shah (born Bahadur Khan; died 13 February 1537) was a sultan of the Muzaffarid dynasty who reigned over the Gujarat Sultanate, a late medieval kingdom in India from 1526 to 1535 and again from 1536 to 1537.

During his reign, Gujarat was under pressure from the expanding Mughal Empire under emperors Babur (died 1530) and Humayun (1530–1540), and from the Portuguese, who were establishing fortified settlements on the Gujarat coast to expand their power in India from their base in Goa. He also ruled over the Malwa Sultanate after conquering it in 1531. He ascended to the throne after competing with his brothers. He expanded his kingdom and made expeditions to help neighbouring kingdoms. In 1532, Gujarat came under attack of Humayun and fell. Bahadur Shah regained the kingdom in 1536, but he was killed by the Portuguese on board a ship when making a deal with them.

== Early years and origin ==
Bahadur Shah was born in the Muzaffarid dynasty, which ruled over Gujarat. The origins of the dynasty lied in south Punjab.

Bahadur Shah's father was prince Khalil Khan, who later ascended to the throne of the Gujarat Sultanate in 1511 as Muzaffar Shah II. His mother was Rani Lakshmi Bai, daughter of a Gohel Rajput. Bahadur Shah had accompanied his father in his campaign to Khandesh, and on their return he was retained by his grandfather, Sultan Mahmud Begada, at his court who treated him with particular affection. Mahmud is said to have publicly predicted that Bahadur Khan would become a great king and, on one occasion, told him that he had prayed to God to grant Bahadur the throne of Gujarat.

== Exile in Mewar and Delhi ==
Muzaffar Shah II nominated Sikandar Shah (Bahadur Shah's elder brother) as the heir apparent to the throne. Bahadur Khan's relationship with his brother and father became tense as Sikandar Shah began to assume greater administrative control. Fearing for his life, Bahadur Khan fled Gujarat, first seeking refuge with Chittor, and then with Ibrahim Lodi. During his stay, Rana Sanga's nephew invited Bahadur Khan to an entertainment program. A dancing girl caught everyone's attention. The nephew boasted that she was daughter of the Qazi of Ahmadnagar whom he had seized during Rana Sanga's invasion of Gujarat. The prince, outraged by the insult, struck him with a sword-cut, killing him on the spot. The enraged Rajputs sought to kill Bahadur, but Rani Karnavati intervened and saved his life. He was present at the Battle of Panipat, though he did not take part in fighting.

== Succession ==
After death of Muzaffar Shah II in 1526, Sikandar Shah succeeded. After few weeks in power, he was murdered on the instructions of his slave Imad-ul-Mulk Khush Kadam, who seated an infant brother of Sikandar's, named Nasir Khan, on the throne with the title of Mahmud Shah II and governed on his behalf. Three other princes were poisoned. The only event of Sikandar's reign was the destruction of an army sent against his brother Latif Khan who was helped by Rana Bhim of Munga (now Chhota Udaipur). When Bahadur Khan received the news of the death of his father, he returned to Gujarat. The nobles deserted Imad-ul-Mulk's cause, and prince Bahadur Khan, was joined by many supporters prominent among whom was Taj Khan, proprietor of Dhandhuka. Bahadur marched at once on Champaner, captured and executed Imad-ul-Mulk and poisoning Nasir Khan ascended the throne in 1527 with the title of Bahadur Shah.

His brother Latif Khan, aided by Raja Bhim of the Kohistan or hill land of Pal (Pal-Dadhvav, near Bhuloda, Gujarat), now asserted his claim to the throne. He was defeated, and fell wounded into the hands of the Gujarat army and died of his wounds and was buried at Halol. Raja Bhim was slain. As Bhim's successor Raisingh plundered Dahod, a large force was sent against him, commanded by Taj Khan, who laid waste Raisingh's country and dismantled his forts. Only one of his brother, Chand Khan survived, as he had refuge at the Malwa court and the Sultan Mahmud Shah II of Malwa refused to surrender him.

== Reign ==
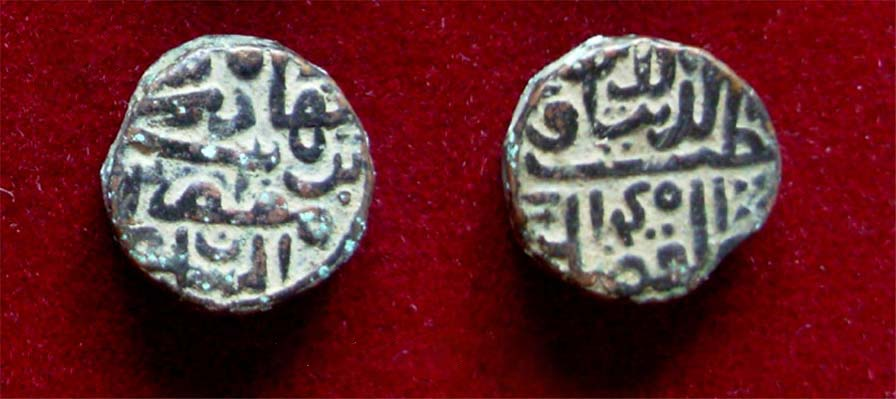
Copper coin of Bahadur Shah

Bahadur Shah visited Cambay, and found that Malik Is-hak (the governor of Sorath and son of Malik Ayyaz), had, in the interests of the Portuguese, attempted to seize Diu but had been repulsed by the Gujarat admiral Mahmúd aka. The Sultan entrusted Diu to Kiwam-ul-Mulk and Junagaḍh to Mujahid Khan Bhikan and returned to ahmedabad. In 1527 he enforced tribute from idar and the neighbouring country. During one of his numerous expeditions, he went to hunt in Nandod and received the homage of the Raja.

=== Deccan campaign ===
As the Portuguese were endeavouring to establish themselves on the coast of Sorath, and, if possible, to obtain Diu, the king was constantly at Khambhat, Diu and Ghogha to frustrate their attempts, and he now directed the construction of the fortress of Bharuch. At this time Bahadur's nephew Muhammad Khan, ruler of Asir and Burhanpur (both of Khandesh), requested Bahadur's aid on behalf of Imad-ul-Mulk, ruler of Berar. Bahadur Shah started at once and at Nandurbar was joined by Muhammad Khan Asiri, and thence proceeded to Burhanpur, where he was met by Imad Shah from Gawilghur. After certain successes he made peace between Burhan Nizam Shah I and Imad Shah, and returned to Gujarat.

Jam Firuz II of Sindh now sought refuge with Bahadur Shah from the oppression either of the Ghoris or of the Mongol Arghuns and was hospitably received. In 1528 Bahadur made an expedition into the Deccan which ended in a battle at Daulatabad. Later he was forced to retire because of the stiff resistance put up by the Ahmadnagar army. Next year in 1529 at the request of Jafar, son of Aladdin Imad Shah, who was sent to Gujarat to solicit Bahadur's help, he again marched for the Deccan. As he passed through Muler Biharji the Raja of Baglan gave him his sister in marriage and in return received the title of Bahar Khan. On Bahadur's request, another sister of Baharji was married to Bahadur's nephew Muhammad Shah of Khandesh. From Baglan Bahr Khan was told off to ravage Chaul which by this time had fallen into the hands of the Portuguese. Bahadur himself advanced to Ahmednagar, took the fort and destroyed many of the buildings. Purandhar also was sacked of its stores of gold. From Ahmednagar, Bahadur Shah passed to Burhanpur, and there his general Kaisar Khan gained a victory over the united forces of Burhan Nizam Shah, Malik Barid, and Ain-ul-Mulk. Finally, both the rulers of the Ahmadnagar and Berar were forced to sign a humiliating treaty. Bahadur returned to Gujarat and for some time refrained from interfering in the affairs of the Deccan.

Between 1526 and 1530, certain Turks under one Mustafa came to Gujarat, traders according to one account according to another part of a Turkish fleet expected to act against the Portuguese. Diu was assigned them as a place of residence and the command of the island was granted to Malik Túghan, son of Malik Ayyaz, the former governor.

Bahadur Shah had sent a delegation headed by 'Abd al-'Aziz Asaf Khan to Ottoman Empire in 1530s.

In 1530 the king marched to Nagor, and gave an audience both to Prithviraj of Dungarpur and to the ambassadors from Rana Ratan Singh II of Chittor. The Rana's ambassadors complained of encroachments on Chittor by Mahmúd Shah II of Malwa Sultanate. Mahmúd promised to appear before Bahadur to explain the alleged encroachments. Bahadur waited. At last, as Mahmúd failed to attend, Bahadur said he would go and meet Mahmúd. He invested Mandu and received with favour certain deserters from Mahmúd's army. The fortress at Mandu fell and Sultan Mahmúd and his seven sons were captured without any resistance on 28 March 1531. Malwa was annexed into Bahadur's kingdom.

After passing the rainy season at Mandu, Bahadur Shah went to Burhanpur to visit his nephew Miran Muhammad Shah. At Burhanpur, Bahadur under the influence of the great priest-statesman Shah Tahir, was reconciled with Burhan Nizam Shah I gave him the royal canopy he had taken from Malwa. Bahadur offered Shah Tahir the post of minister. Shah Tahir declined saying he must make a pilgrimage to Mecca. He retired to Ahmednagar and there converted Burhan Nizam Shah to the Shia Islam.

In the same year, hearing that Mansingji, Raja of Halvad, had killed the commandant of Dasada, Bahadur despatched Khan Khanan against him. Viramgam and Mandal were taken over from the Jhala chieftains, and ever after formed part of the crown dominions.

=== Conquest of Malwa ===
When Malwa's Sultan Mahmúd II and his sons were being conveyed to the fortress of Champaner, Raisingh, Raja of Pal, endeavoured to rescue them. The attempt failed, and the prisoners were put to death by their guards. In 1531, on Bahadur's return from Burhanpur to Dhar, hearing that Silhadi, the chief of Raisen in east Malwa kept in captivity certain women who had belonged to the harem of Sultan Nasir-ud-din of Malwa, Bahadur marched against him Tnd laid siege on Raisen. Request was sent to Rana Vikramaditya Singh of Chitor for aid and delayed handing over Raisen. On learning this Bahadur dispatched a force to keep Chitor in check and pressed the siege. At his own request, Silhadi was sent to persuade the garrison to surrender. But their reproaches stung him so sharply, that, joining with them, they sallied forth sword in hand and were all slain. Raisen fell into Bahadur's hands, and this district together with those of Bhilsa and Chanderi were entrusted to the government of Sultan Alam Lodhi. The king now went to Gondwana to hunt elephants, and, after capturing many, employed his army in reducing Gagraon and other minor fortresses. In 1532, he advanced against Chittor, but raised the siege on receiving an enormous ransom. Shortly afterwards his troops took the strong fort of Ranthambhore.

About this time on receipt of news that the Portuguese were usurping authority, the Sultan repaired to Diu. Before he arrived the Portuguese had taken to flight, leaving behind them an enormous gun which the Sultan ordered to be dragged to Champaner.

=== Humayun's Conquest of Gujarat ===
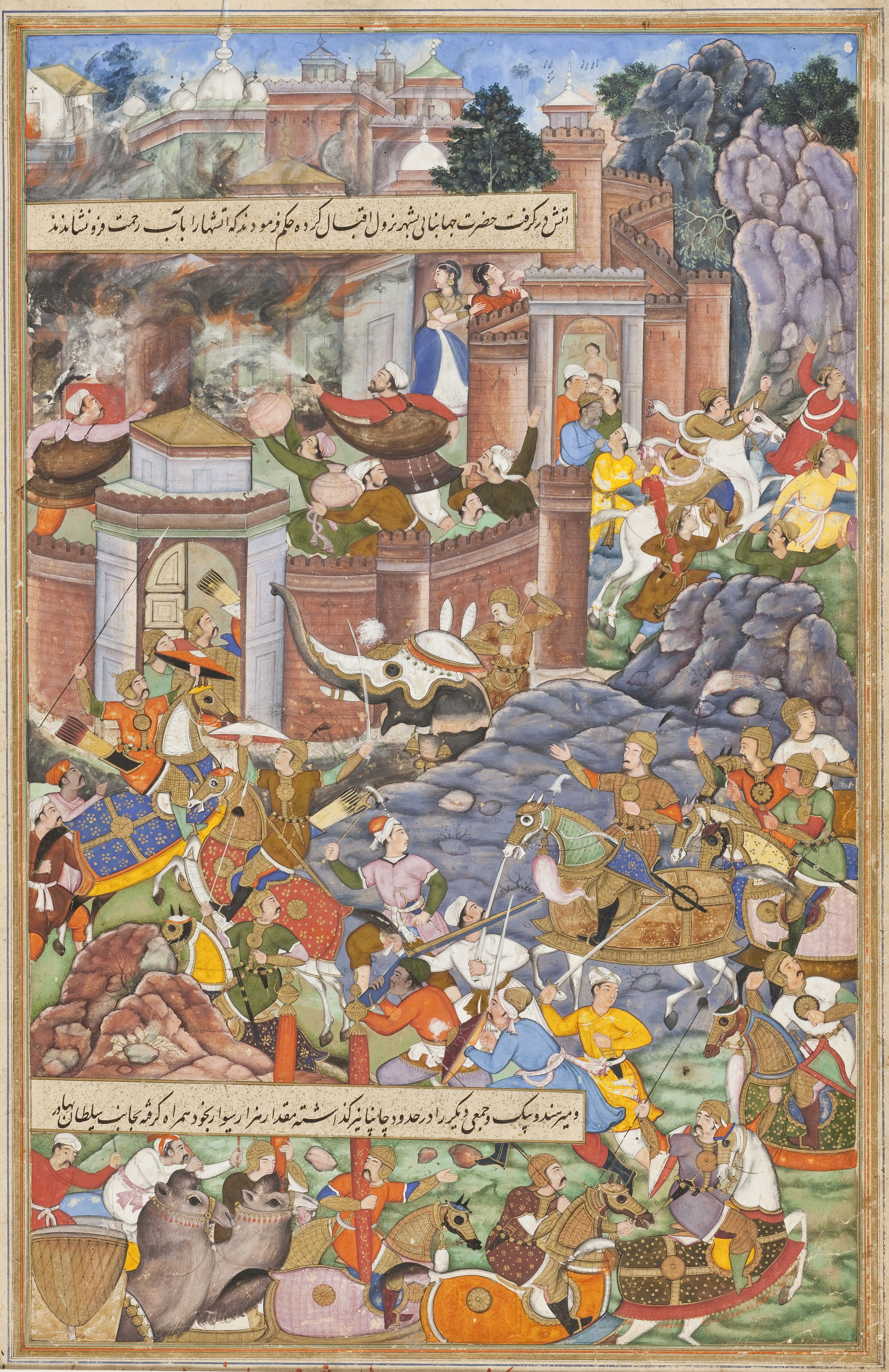
The Mughal Emperor Humayun, fights Bahadur Shah of Gujarat, in the year 1535.

Before 1532 was over, Bahadur Shah quarrelled with Humayun, the Mughal emperor of Delhi. The original grounds for the quarrel was that Bahadur Shah had sheltered Sultan Muhammad Zaman Mirza, the grandson of a daughter of the emperor Babar. Humayún's anger was increased by an insolent answer from Bahadur Shah. Without considering that he had provoked a powerful enemy, Bahadur Shah again laid siege to Chittor, and though he heard that Humayún had arrived at Gwalior, he would not desist from the siege. In March 1535 Chittor fell into the hands of the Gujarat king but near Mandasúr (now mandsaur) his army was shortly afterwards routed by Humayún. According to one account, the failure of the Gujarat army was due to Bahadur and his nobles being spell-bound by looking at a heap of salt and some cloth soaked in indigo which were mysteriously left before Bahadur's tent by an unknown elephant. The usual and probably true explanation is that Rúmi Khan the Turk, head of the Gujarat artillery, betrayed Bahadur's interest. Still though Rúmi Khan's treachery may have had a share in Bahadur's defeat it seems probable that in valour, discipline, and tactics the Gujarat army was inferior to the Mughals. Bahadur Shah, unaccustomed to defeat, lost heart and fled to Mandu, which fortress was speedily taken by Humayún. From Mandu the king fled to Champaner, and finally took refuge in Diu. Champaner fell to Humayún, and the whole of Gujarat, except Sorath, came under his rule. The army of Bahadur Shah included the Koli tribe and Abyssinians. The Kolis of Gujarat attacked Humayun in the help of Bahadur Shah at the Gulf of Khambhat.

At this time Sher Shah Suri revolted, in Bihar and Jaunpur, and Humayún returned to Agra to oppose him leaving his brother Hindal Mirza in ahmedabad, Kasam Beg in Bharuch, and Yadgar Nasir Mirza in Patan. As soon as Humayún departed, the country rose against the Mughals, and his old nobles requested the king to join them. Bahadur joined them, and, defeating the Mughals at Kanij village near Mahmúdabad (now Mahemdavad), expelled them from Gujarat.

=== Engagement with the Portuguese and death ===
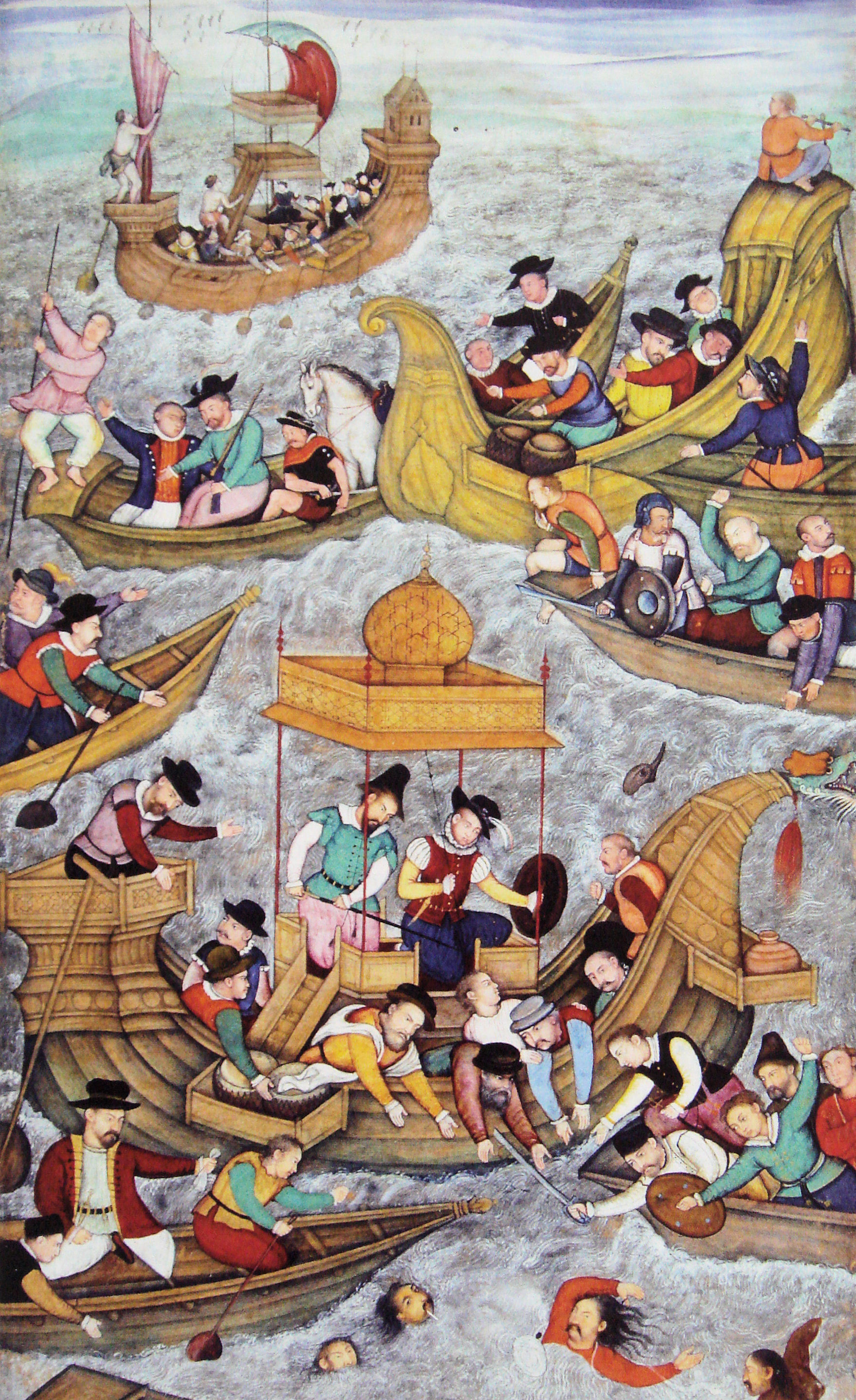
Death of Bahadur Shah in front of Diu during negotiations with the Portuguese, in 1537. Akbar Nama, end of 16th century.

While Bahadur was engaged in the siege of Mandu against the Mughals, a strong Portuguese fleet sailed from Bombay (now Mumbai), led by Nuno da Cunha. On 7 February 1531 the fleet neared Shiyal Bet island, which they captured in spite of strong resistance. On 16 February 1531 they started bombarding Diu but could not succeed to inflict any appreciable damage to its fortification. On 1 March 1531 Nuno da Cunha left for Goa, leaving a subordinate officer, who systematically destroyed Mahuva, Ghogha, Valsad, Mahim, Kelva, Agashi and Surat.

As Gujarat fell to the Mughal Empire, Bahadur Shah was forced to court the Portuguese. On 23 December 1534 while on board the galleon St. Mattheus he signed the Treaty of Bassein. Based on the terms of the agreement, the Portuguese Empire gained control of the city of Bassein (Vasai), as well as its territories, islands, and seas which included Daman and Bombay islands too. He had granted them leave to erect a factory in Diu. Instead of a factory the Portuguese built the Diu Fort.

When he recovered his kingdom, Bahadur, repenting his alliance with the Portuguese, went to Sorath to persuade an army of the Portuguese, whom he had asked to come to his assistance, to return to Goa. In February 1537, when the Portuguese arrived at Diu, five or six thousand strong, the sultan hoping to get rid of them by stratagem, went to Diu and endeavored to get the viceroy into his power. The viceroy excused himself, and in return invited the king to visit his ship anchored off the coast of Gujarat. Bahadur agreed, and on his way back was attacked and killed by the Portuguese; his body was dumped into the Arabian Sea. He was then thirty-one years old and in the eleventh year of his reign. According to the author of the Mirăt-i-Sikandari the reason for Bahadur's murder was that a message from him to the Deccan sultans, inviting them to join him in an alliance against the Portuguese, had fallen into the hands of the viceroy. Whatever may have been the provocation or the intention, both sides had treacherous designs; neither party was able to carry out its original plan. The end was unpremeditated, hurried on by mutual suspicions. These events were followed by the 1538 Siege of Diu which resulted in the permanent occupation of Diu by Portuguese which lasted till 1961.

=== His Sultanate ===
Up to the defeat of Sultan Bahadur by Humayún, the power of Gujarat was at its height. Cadets of noble Rajput houses, Prithiraj, the nephew of Rana Sanga of Chitor, and Narsingh Deva the cousin of the Raja of Gwalior, were proud to enroll themselves as the Sultan's vassals. The Raja of Baglan readily gave Bahadur Shah his daughter. Jam Firúz of Thatta in Sindh and the sons of Bahlúl Lodhi were suppliants at his court. Malwa was a dependency of Gujarat and the Nizam Shahis of Ahmednagar and Nasirkhan of Burhanpur acknowledged him as overlord, while the Farúkis of Khandesh were dependent on Bahadur's constant help.

He built the mausoleum at Halol in honour of his brothers and predecessors, Sikandar Shah and Mahmud Shah II.

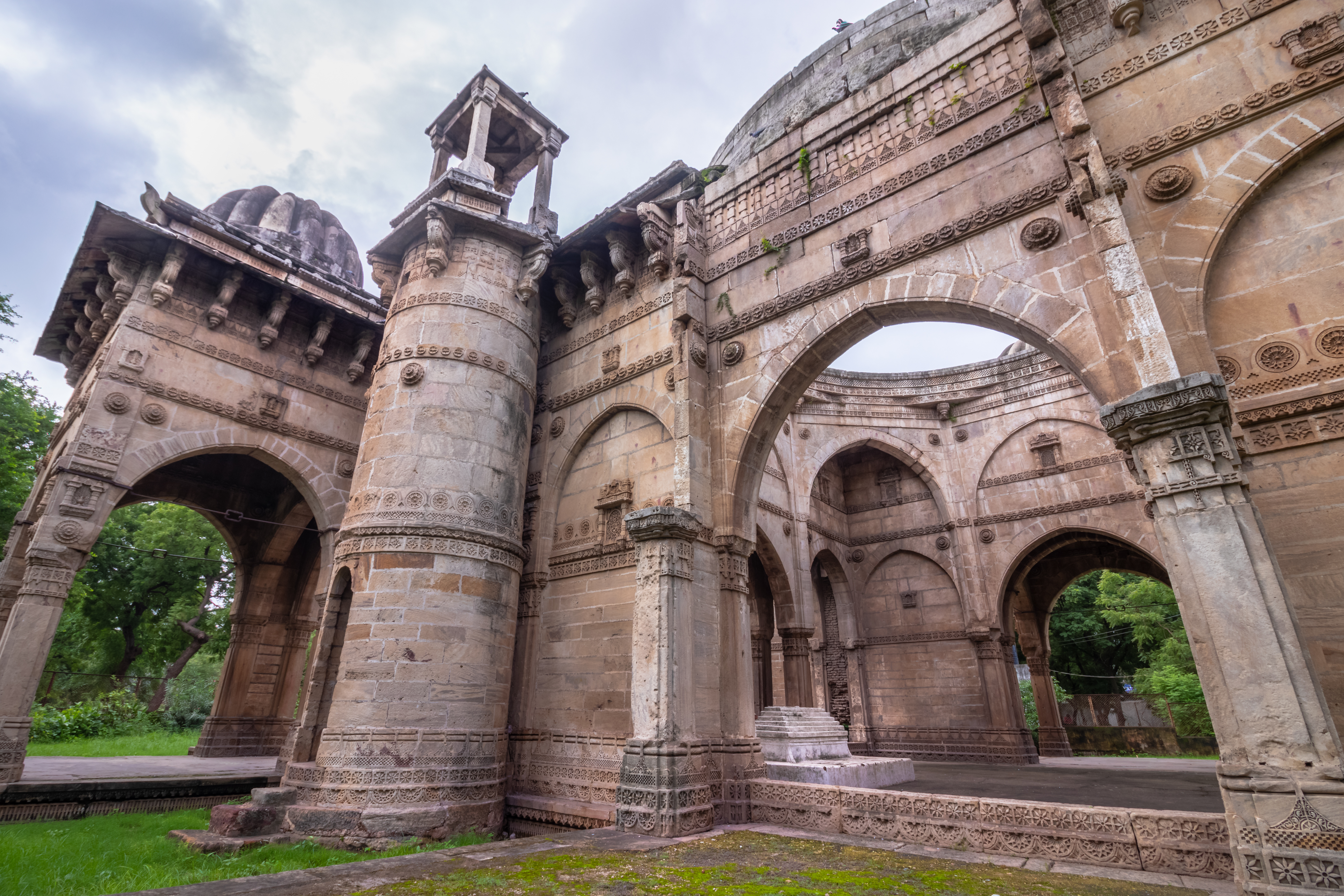
Tomb of Sikandar Shah of Gujarat

He was a great patron of the Hindustani Classical music and its artists, including Baiju Bawra.

== Succession ==
Bahadur had no son, hence there was some uncertainty regarding succession after his death. Before his death, Bahadur Shah had designated his sister's son, Miran Muhammad Shah of Khandesh as his successor, publicly seated him on the throne and personally offered salaam, requiring the ministers and nobles to acknowledge him as the future ruler.

Muhammad Zaman Mirza, the fugitive Mughal prince made his claim on the ground that Bahadur's mother adopted him as her son. The nobles thus invited Miran Muhammad Shah to come to Gujarat as quickly as possible, but he died on his way to Gujarat. Finally, the nobles selected Mahmud Khan, the son of Bahadur's brother Latif Khan as his successor and he ascended to the throne as Mahmud Shah III on 10 May 1538.
