= Silhadi =

Rajput chief (died 1532)

Raja Shiladitya Tomar (Silhadi)
- Born: Malwa Sultanate
- Died: 6 May 1532; Dhar, Malwa Sultanate
- Spouse: Rani Durgawati
- Children: Bhupat Rai; Puran Mal
- Relatives: Lakshman Singh (Brother)
- Military career
- Allegiance: Malwa Sultanate (1511–17); Kingdom of Mewar (1517–27); Mughal Empire (1527–29); Gujarat Sultanate (1531–32)
- Rank: Chieftain
- Conflicts: Battle of Bayana; Battle of Khanwa (AWOL); Siege of Mandu; Siege of Raisen (1532)

Raja Shiladitya Tomar, also called Silhadi Tomar (died 6 May 1532), was a chieftain of northeast Malwa in the early decades of 16th century India. First serving under the Sultans of Malwa he later became vassal of Rana Sanga of Mewar and remained as an ally and Sanga helped him and Medini Rai in various battles and in conquering Malwa from Sultans. Later, he allied with Rana Ratan Singh II and Bahadur Shah of Gujarat. Lastly shifting his allegiance to Vikramaditya Singh. He was killed in the siege of Raisen (1532).

== Early life ==
Silhadi was a Tomar Rajput chieftain. His association with the Gahlots and Sisodias (a branch of Gahlots) is probably a result of his marriage into the Sisodia ruling family of Mewar. However, he most probably belonged to the Tomar clan, and came from the Tonwarghar tract located to the north of Gwalior.

Silhadi has also been described as a Purbiya Rajput, but the term "Purbiya" here is not a clan name. He commanded a mercenary force of Rajputs from the eastern region (Purab), which included Awadh, Bihar and the area around Varanasi. These soldiers were called Purbiya (eastern), and therefore, Silhadi was described as a Purbiya too.

== Military career ==
Along with his relative Medini Rai, Silhadi rose to position of power in the service of Sultan Mahmud Khilji II (ruled 1510-1531) of the Malwa Sultanate. Medini Rai and Silhadi were de facto rulers of the northeastern Malwa region during Mahmood’s reign. Bhilsa, Chanderi and Raisen were their strongholds. At one time they had become so powerful that they seemed to start open rebellion. But in any ways, they became semi-independent regions.

Both Silhadi and Rai assisted by Rana Sanga of Mewar managed to conquer most of the Malwa. Chanderi was capital of Medini rai's kingdom Malwa now, under lordship of Sanga. While Silhadi established himself as lord of Sarangpur and Raisen region as a vassal ruler of Rana Sanga. He remained a decisive factor in the politics of north and central India during his life and was responsible for sinking the fortunes of many kings by his sudden defections. He joined the Mughals with a garrison of 30,000 Rajputs. After betraying Rana Sanga, Silhadi converted to Islam and was given the name "Silah-al-din". According to some historians this betrayal never happened and was a later concoction. R.C Majumadar mentions, "Silhadi continued to help Mewar loyally long after the battle and was one of the trustiest officers of Sanga's Son and successor Ratan Simha, story of treachery of Silhadi was a much later invention". Dirk H. a. Kolff mentions that Silhadi, who was kept under surveillance in camp of Bahadur Shah of Gujarat opted to convert to Islam as a radical solution during siege of Raisen fort by the Gujarati Army.

== Death ==
In 1531, Bahadur Shah of Gujarat reached Dhár, hearing that Silhadi kept in captivity certain women who had belonged to the harem of Sultán Násir-ud-dín of Málwa, Bahádur marched against him and forced him to surrender and embrace Islám. The chief secretly sent to the Rána of Chitor for aid and delayed handing over Raisen. On learning this Bahádur dispatched a force to keep Chitor in check and pressed the siege. At his own request, Silhadi was sent to persuade the garrison to surrender. But their reproaches stung him so sharply, that, joining with them, they sallied forth sword in hand and were all slain.

According to Dirk H. A. Kolff the conversion to Islam was more of a radical solution than anything else. "But Silhadi, who was kept under surveillance in Bahadur Shah’s camp, seems personally to have been prepared to opt for radical solutions. When he saw that his men in the fort of Raisen, under the command of his brother Lakshman, were sorely put to defend themselves against the Gujarati army, he told the sultan that he wished 'to be dignified with the nobility of Islam'. The sultan was delighted, 'repeated to him the words expressing the unity of God', whereupon Silhadi accepted the faith receiving a special robe of honour and various kinds of food from the royal kitchen. By embracing Islam, Silhadi seemed to have found a definitive answer to the problem of the Muslim women under his care as well as to the central problem of his place in the Islamic kingdom."

a son of Silhadi was sent with 2,000 Purbiya soldiers to meet another son of his, named Bhupat, who was assisted by the rana of Mewar. The latter was by now on his way to relieve Raisen. But the Rajput rescue force was defeated and the head of Silhadi’s son along with those of many comrades in arms was sent to the sultan. Soon Bahadur Shah sent him away to a Mandu prison. Lakshman, after a siege of months, sent a message to the sultan asking him to summon Silhadi to his presence, to forgive him and to offer him an assurance of safety. He, Lakshman, would then evacuate the fort and surrender. Bahadur Shah granted this request. Durgavati, who was Bhupat’s mother, asked the sultan to allow her husband to come up into the fort so that he, rather than strangers, would conduct her and the other women down into the camp. So Silhadi, accompanied by one of the sultan’s trusted amirs, was allowed to see his family. At the meeting Silhadi was asked what iqta Bahadur Shah offered them 'in exchange for the fort of Raisen, and the country of Gondwana'.The sultan had chosen the town of Baroda in Gujarat as their place of residence and Silhadi told them so. They must have realised that they were thus to be cut off from Rajasthan, the land of their Sisodia allies, from Hindustan, which included the Purbiya recruiting grounds, and finally, from Malwa.

Durgavati and the Purbiya leaders indicated that nothing the sultan could give in recompense for their loss of freedom would really be worth considering: 'Although the Sultan would show us favour and kindness, still for generations the sultanat of these lands essentially is for us a real experience. The right way of bravery is this, that we should perform jauhar of our women and children, and should ourselves fight and be slain; and there should be no further longing left in our hearts.' Nizamuddin, who describes the scene, singles out Durgavati as the main pleader for such drastic action. Silhadi was much moved by her stand. He explained to the Muslim amir who was still there with him and who offered much friendly counsel, what life in the last resort meant to him: Every day one kror of betel leaves, and some seers of camphor are consumed in my harem, and every day three hundred women put on new garments. If we are killed with our women and children, what honour and glory. That was decisive. 'Rani Durgawati, taking her daughter-in-law, who was the sister of Rana Sanga, with (her) two children by the hand got into the jauhar and they with seven hundred beautiful women were burnt.' Silhadi, Lakshman and Taj Khan then armed themselves and died as consecrated warriors in a fight with the sultan’s Deccani infantry at the foot of the fort.
