= Sikandar Shah of Gujarat =

Sultan of Gujarat in 1526

Sikandar Shah II

9th Sultan of Gujarat
- Reign: 5 April – 30 May 1526
- Predecessor: Muzaffar Shah II
- Successor: Mahmud Shah II (r. 1526)
- Successor: Bahadur Shah (r. 1526-35)
- Born: Sikandar Khan
- Died: 30 May 1526; Champaner
- Burial: Tomb of Sikandar Shah, Halol
- Spouse: Nazuklahr
- Dynasty: Muzaffarid dynasty of Gujarat
- Father: Muzaffar Shah II
- Mother: Bibi Rani
- Religion: Islam

Sikandar Shah (born Sikandar Khan; died 30 May 1526) was a ruler of the Muzaffarid dynasty, who reigned over the Gujarat Sultanate for a few weeks before his murder in 1526.

== Reign ==
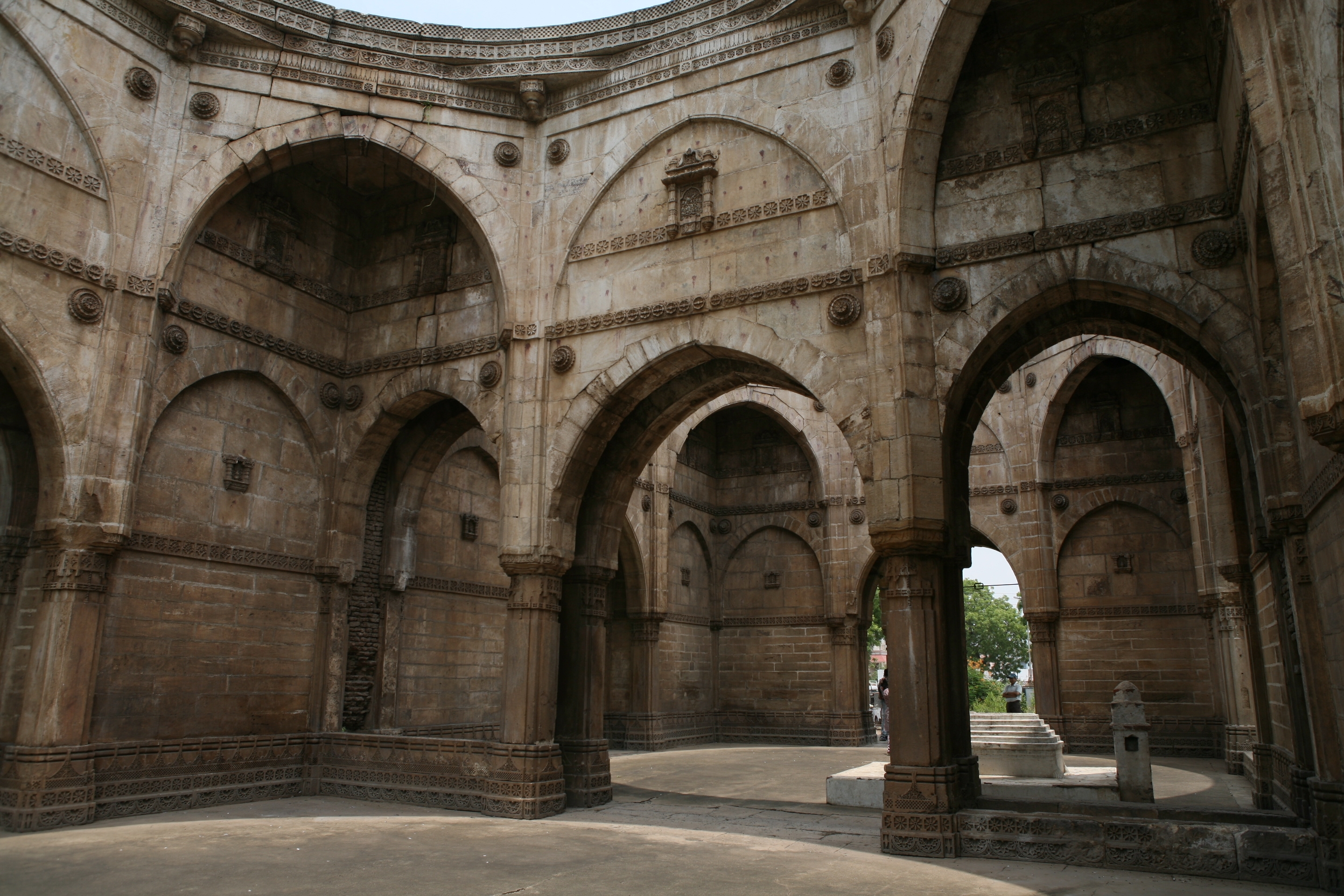
Tomb of Sikandar Shah at Halol

Gujarat Sultan Muzaffar Shah II died at Ahmedabad on 5 April 1526 after formally appointing his son Sikandar Khán his heir, who soon assumed the reign with title of Sikandar Shah. Bibi Rani was his mother. Three days later, he left for Muhammadabad-Champaner. When Bibi Rani died, she had requested Imád-ul-Mulk Khush Kadam, a slave, to befriend Sikandar. He therefore resented the continuation of Khudawand as the Chief Minister (Vazir) in of appointing him. Some people had told him that the Sultan would get him killed.

The Bukhari Sayyid of Vatva, the descendants of the Saint Burhanuddin Qutb-i-Alam, were influential in the Sultanate. Sayyid Shah Sheikhji who was then the head of the family. He had predicted that Bahadur Khan, another son of Muzaffar Shah, would be the successor. So unhappy Sikandar had not given customary visit to him when he went to Champaner.

The only event of Sikandar’s reign was the destruction of an army sent against his brother Latíf Khán who was helped by Rána Bhim of Munga (now Chhota Udaipur).

After Sikandar Sháh had been in power a six weeks, he was murdered on the instruction of Imád-ul-Mulk Khush Kadam, on 30 May 1526 at Champaner. He was asleep in the palace after the return from playing chaugan (polo). The Farishta and Mirat-i-Sikandari mentions that he had dream of his father and Bukhari saints to descend the throne few days before his death.

Imad-ul-Mulk then seated Sikandar Shah's six years old younger brother, Násir Khán, on the throne with the title of Mahmud Shah II and governed on his behalf. The nobles deserted Imád-ul-Mulk’s cause, and prince Báhádur Khán, returning to Gujarát from north India, was joined by many supporters, prominent among whom was Táj Khán, proprietor of Dhandhuka. Bahádur marched at once on Champaner, captured and executed Imád-ul-Mulk and poisoning Násir Khán ascended the throne in 1527 with the title of Bahadur Shah.

Bahadur Shah built a mausoleum, the tomb of Sikandar Shah, in Halol near Champaner in his honour where he was buried along with his brothers, Nasir Khan and Latif Khan. One of Sikandar's concubines, Nazuklahr, was taken by Bahadur Shah in his own harem.
