= Tomb of Sikandar Shah =

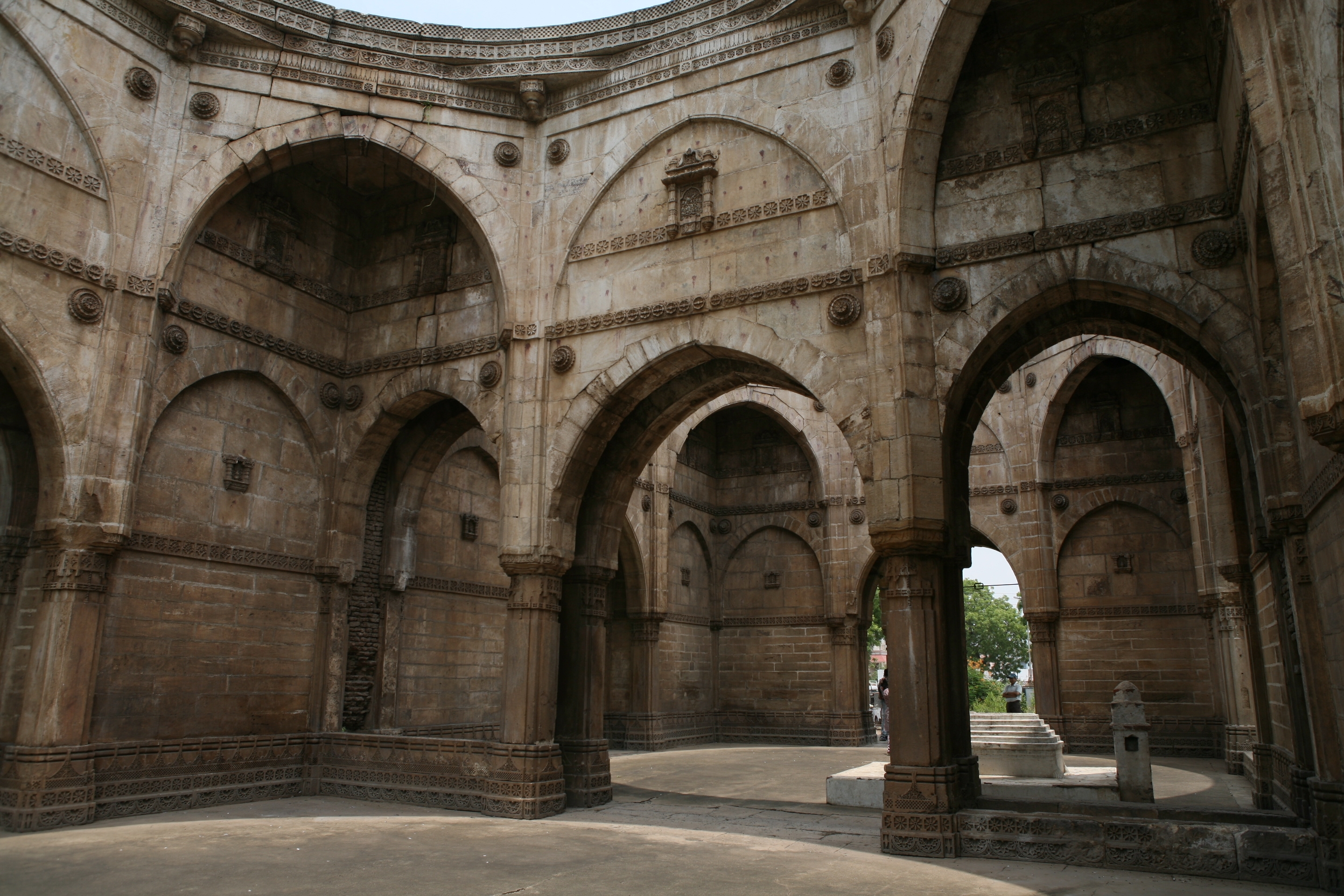
- Interior of the mausoleum
- 22.5056°N 73.4738°E
- Location: Halol, Gujarat, India
- Type: Mausoleum
- Material: Sandstone
- Completion date: c. 1527
- Dedicated to: Sikandar Shah
- Designated: National Monument of Importance (N-GJ-78)

The tomb of Sikandar Shah, also known as Sikandar Shah Maqbara, is a mausoleum built by Gujarat Sultan Bahadur Shah in honour of his brothers and predecessors including Sikandar Shah in c. 1527 at Halol, Gujarat, India.

== History ==
Sikandar Shah, who was then the Gujarat Sultan, was murdered on the instruction of his slave Imád-ul-Mulk Khush Kadam on 30 May 1526 after the reign of few weeks. Imad-ul-Mulk seated Sikandar Shah's six years old younger brother, Nasir Khan, on the throne with the title of Mahmud Shah II and governed on his behalf. The nobles deserted Imad-ul-Mulk’s cause in favour prince Bahadur Khan later. Bahadur Khan marched on Champaner, captured and executed Imad-ul-Mulk. He had defeated his brother Latif Khan who had rebelled against him who later died of wounds. He then poisoned Nasir Khan and his other brothers. He ascended the throne in 1527 with the title of Bahadur Shah. Bahadur Shah raised the mausoleum in honour of his brothers, Sikandar Shah and others.

James Forbes had visited the mausoleum in 1785 and had noted presence of marble tombs adorned with fine carvings. These tombs are now lost.

== Architecture ==
The single storied sandstone mausoleum has two central and five small domes. This mausoleum raised on the elevated plinth in Ahmedabad style. It has two chambers. The interior is adorned with floral patterns and geometric designs especially on porches and pillars. The central domes have fallen down, but the small fluted cupolas above the porches are surviving.

There is a single grave on one side of a chamber with a low pillar near it which indicates that it is dedicated to a martyr. In other chamber, there are no graves. These chambers had once the graves of the brothers of Bahadur Shah; Nasir Khan and Latif Khan who had also died in 1526. At the time of building the mausoleum, a suitable establishment was endowed to say daily prayers for the princes souls, according to Ferishta.
