= Purbiya (soldiers) =

Term for mercenaries in early modern India

Purbiya (or Purabia) was a common term used in late-medieval and early modern India for mercenaries and soldiers from the eastern Gangetic Plain - areas corresponding to present-day western Bihar and eastern Uttar Pradesh. The Purbiyas played a significant role in the militaries of various principalities in Western India including the Marwar army as well at the Gujarat Sultanate and Malwa Sultanate.

The area around Bihar was famous for a high concentration of saltpetre, meaning that many mercenaries from this region were experts in the use of muskets.

== Recruitment ==
The core region for Purbiya recruitment was the Bhojpur region of modern-day Western Bihar and Eastern Uttar Pradesh. The Ujjainiya clan of Rajputs were the main territorial lords of this region and they played the role of specialised recruiting agents and commanders of these Purbiya soldiers who were usually young peasant men native to Bhojpur. The soldiers gained a great reputation among the lords and kings of Northern and Western India and the Ujjainiyas used this to raise their status among other Rajput clans.

Many future Purbiya mercenaries would carry out a pilgrimage to Buxar in modern-day Bihar where they would immerse themselves in a tiger tank. During this process, the young peasant would see themselves as being reborn as a "fearless warrior".

== History ==
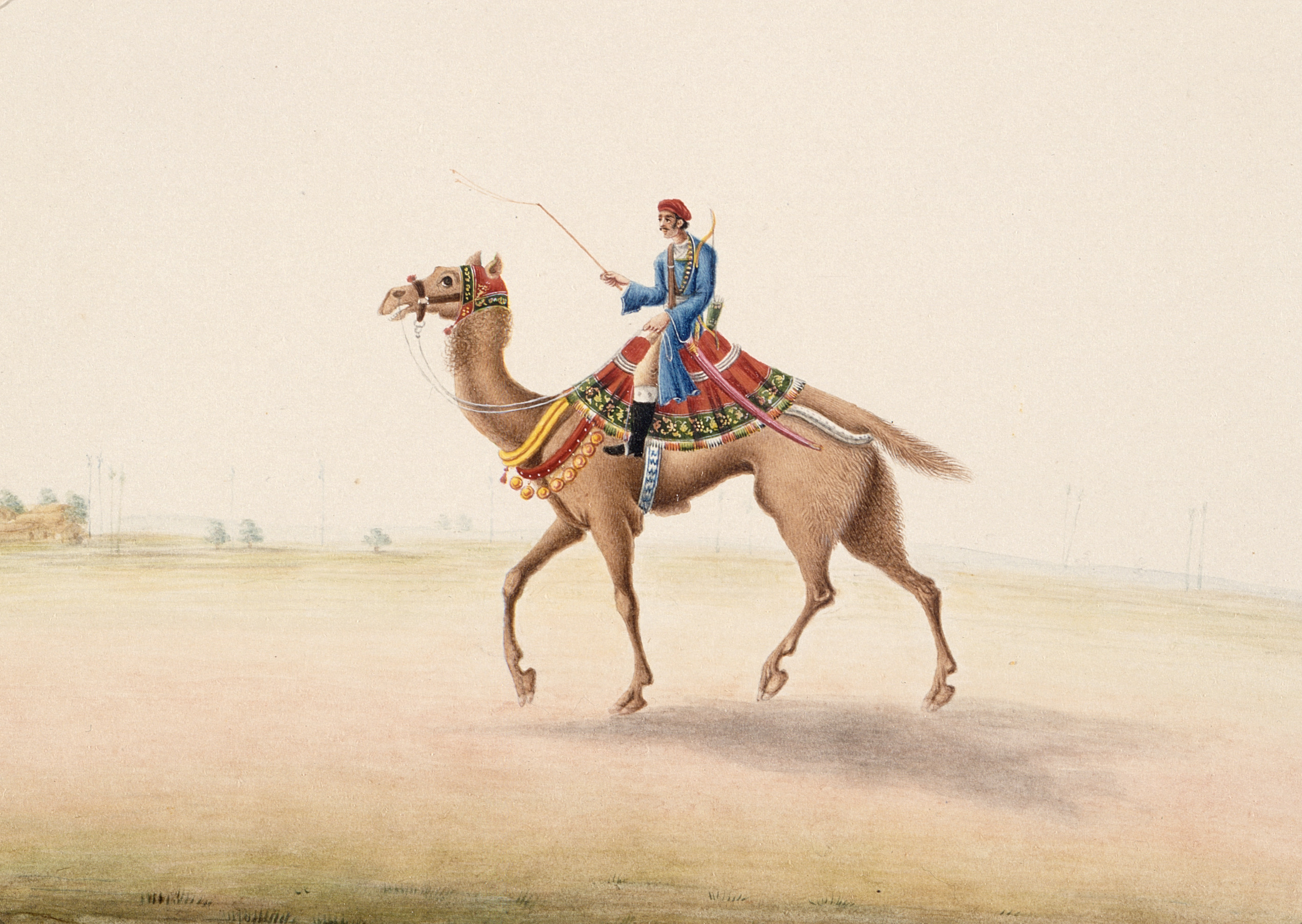
A Purbiya camel rider in Bihar, India in 1825.

The Mughals were among the first groups to enter into the military labour market and start recruiting Purbiyas. Mughal sources detail a diwan of Bihar subah attempting to collect soldiers in Buxar to serve the emperor.

The rulers of Malwa were also keen recruiters due to Purbiyas' expertise with firearms. This expertise may have been gained due to the easy availability of saltpetre in their native areas. Most Purbiyas were mercenaries and were paid for their services but some were actual kings of smaller principalities. This recruitment drive from Malwa saw the large influx of Purbiya soldiers into the region. Many of the local chieftains in Malwa depended heavily on Purbiya soldiers such as Silhadi who eventually became known as a Purbiya himself. The presence of Purbiya mercenaries in Gujarat are referenced in 16th and 17th century Persian chronicles including many Purbiya gunners serving in the army of Bahadur Shah of the Gujarat Sultanate in 1535.

Purbiyas had a long tradition of being recruited as mercenaries for various rulers such as the British and the Marathas. Purbiyas made up the majority of the Bengal Army. Prior to 1857, the British East India Company preferred to recruit Purbiya soldiers, who they designated as "The fighting tribes of the Hindoos and the Musselmen", or simply "Easterners". The Bengal Army of the East India Company preferred to recruit its sepoys from the Brahmins and Rajputs of Awadh and Bihar, in part because they had an average height of 5'8", an important consideration in an army that valued impressive appearance amongst its soldiers. Despite its name the Bengal army, created first, mostly recruited Brahmins, Rajputs, and Bhumihars from Awadh and Bihar.

=== Bengal Army and 1857 mutiny ===
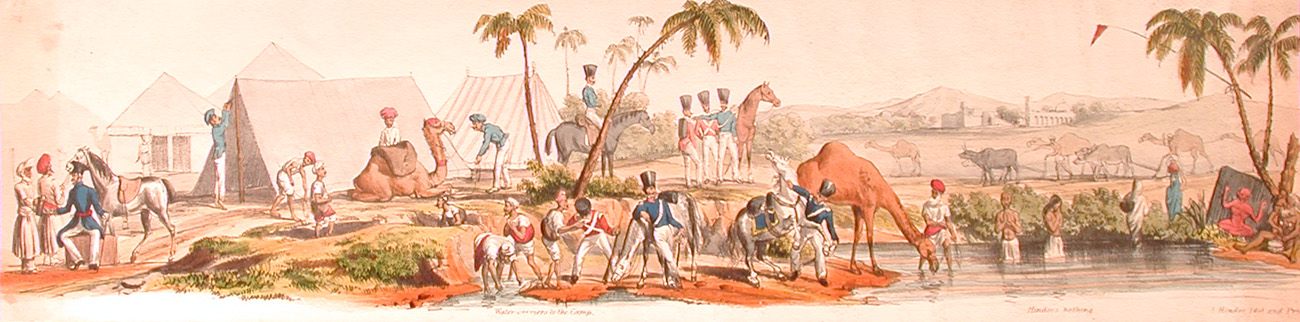
Bengal troops in the 19th century (1840s), the majority of troops in the Bengal Army were Purbiyas

Prior to 1857, company military service was most popular in the zamindaris of North and South Bihar with the East India Company signing contracts to raise levies of troops from them. Recruits from the Rajput and Bhumihar caste were common and they would use service in the Bengal Army as an opportunity to raise their wealth and status and for this reason, the Bhumihar zamindaris of Bihar became "prime recruiting grounds" for the Army. In the 1780s, the Company maintained a major recruiting station in Buxar with six companies under a Captain Eaton. These recruiting stations in Bihar were kept as "nurseries" which supplied battalions when drafts were made. Other recruiting centres were located in Bhagalpur, Shahabad, Monghyr, Saran and Hajipur.

Brigadier Troup, who served as the commander of Bareilly, stated of recruitment that the ‘Bengal native Infantry came chiefly from the province of Awadh, Buxar, Bhojpur and Arrah.’ In 1810, Francis Buchanan-Hamilton noted in his account of the districts of Bihar, that the number of men absent from Shahabad to serve in the Army was 4680. The Ujjainiya zamindar of Bhojpur also informed him that 12000 recruits from his district had joined the Bengal Army.

The Purbiya units of the Bengal Army played a major role in the Indian Rebellion of 1857 against the British. Mangal Pandey, a notable figure during the start of the mutiny, was a Purbiya serving in the 34th Bengal Native Infantry. Following the suppression of the uprising, British authorities decided not to recruit troops from the eastern plains, and the new Bengal Army was to be recruited primarily from the North Western ethnic groups which had Hindu, Sikh and Muslim communities of the Punjab and North-west frontier province. Purbiya recruitment from the western regions of the United Provinces and the Delhi region continued but on a much smaller scale (two out of sixty-four regiments by 1893).

== See also ==
- Mercenaries in India
- Camel cavalry
