= Nizamuddin Ahmad =

Medieval Indian historian (1551–1621)

- Born: 1551 CE
- Died: 1621 CE
- Occupations: Historian, Mir Bakhshi

Academic work
- Era: Late Medieval India
- Main interests: General history, Islamic history
- Notable works: Tabaqat-i-Akbari

Khwaja Nizam-ud-Din Ahmad Bakshi (also spelled as Nizam ad-Din Ahmad and Nizam al-Din Ahmad) (born 1551, died 1621/1030 AH) was a Muslim historian of late medieval India. He was son of Muhammad Muqim-i-Harawi. He was Akbar's Mir Bakhshi. His work, the Tabaqat-i-Akbari, is a comprehensive work on general history covering the time from the Ghaznavids (986-7) up to the 38th year of Akbar's reign (1593-4/1002 AH). The author quoted twenty-nine authorities in his work, some of which are entirely lost to us now.

== See also ==
- Muntakhab al-Tawarikh
