= Halol =

- city
- Location in Gujarat, India Halol (India)
- Coordinates: 22.5°N 73.47°E
- Country: India
- State: Gujarat
- District: Panchmahal

Area
  - Total: 14 km^{2} (5.4 sq mi)
- Elevation: 499 m (1,637 ft)

Population (2001)
  - Total: 41,108
  - Density: 2,900/km^{2} (7,600/sq mi)

Languages
  - Official: Gujarati
- Time zone: UTC+5:30 (IST)
- Vehicle registration: GJ-17
- Website: gujaratindia.com

Halol is a city and a municipality (tehsil) in Panchmahal district in the Indian state of Gujarat. Located in western India, it has an average elevation of 499 metres (1637 feet). Halol is a major manufacturing hub of Western India, home to manufacturing facilities of numerous domestic and multinational companies like MG Motor India, Siemens Gamesa, JCB India, Hero Motocorp, Sun Pharma, TOTO India, CEAT Tyres, LM Wind Power, Polycab India, etc.

== Demography ==
As of 2011 India census, Halol city had a population of 41,108. Males constituted 53% of the population and females 47%. Halol had an average literacy rate of 72%, higher than the national average of 59.5%: male literacy was 76%, and female literacy was 66%. In Halol, 14% of the population was under 6 years of age.

== Geography ==
Situated at Latitude = 22° 30′ 0″ N (22.5) and Longitude = 73° 28′ 0″ E (73.46667) There is a large body of water that was built in 1938 to provide the city with a dependable water supply. Halol is around 40 km from Bodeli, Vadodara and Godhra. It is also near to the tourist spot Pavagadh, a World Heritage Site Champaner.

== Hospitals ==
Many hospitals and clinics like Referral Hospital, Shree Rang Hospital, Niramay Hospital are available in the city. Halol hospital and ICU hospital with all the necessary facilities and emergency treatment for dealing with cardiac and diabetic conditions. also it has multispeciality ayurveda and panchakarma hospital named Mahakali Ayurveda Hospital and Panchakarma Centre

== Industry ==
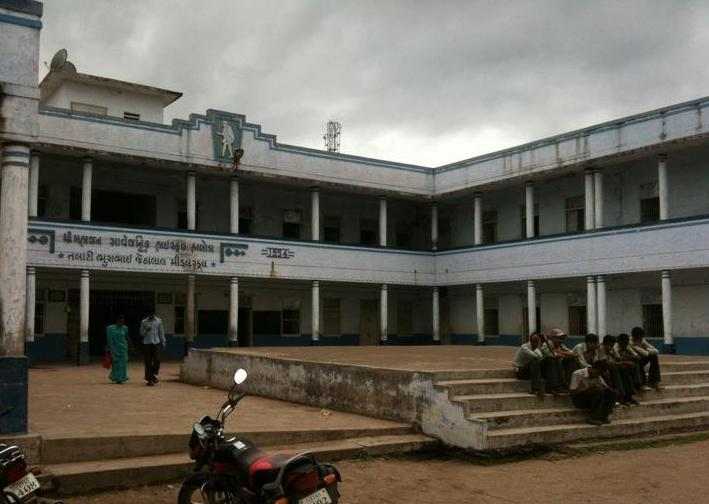
M S Highschool, Halol

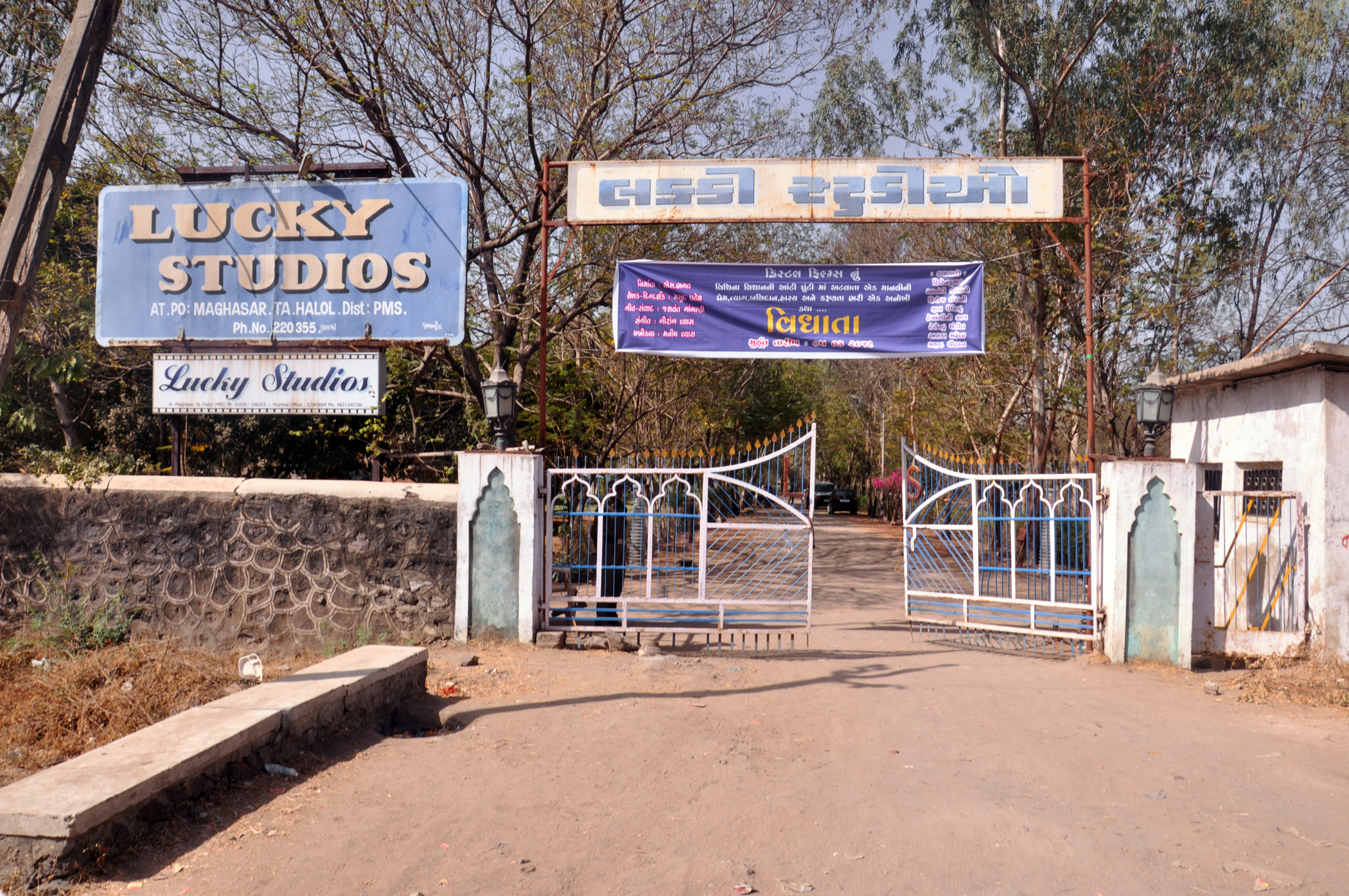
Lucky Studio in 2012

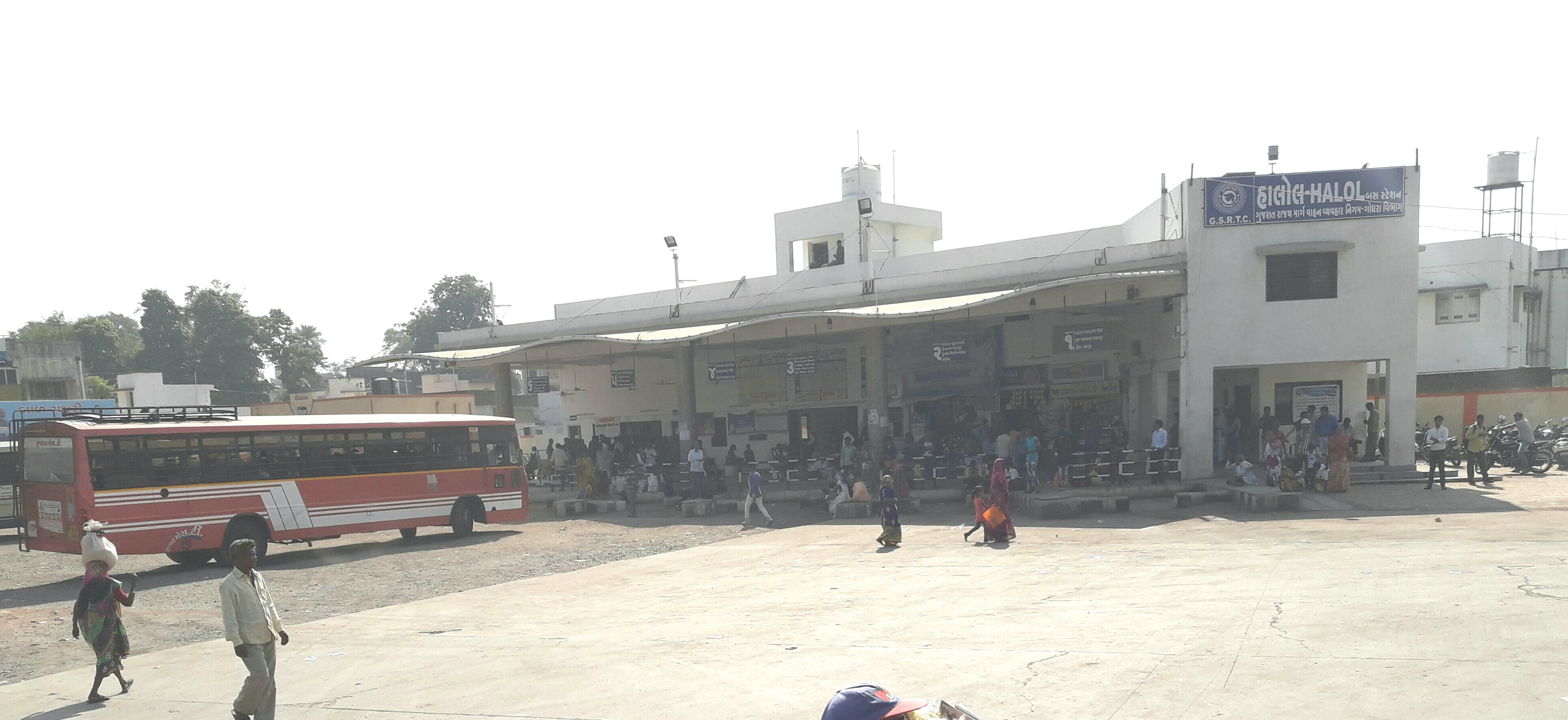
GSRTC bus station, Halol

Many large companies are located here including MG Motor India, Alembic Pharma, Siemens Gamesa, Hero Motocorp, Sun Pharma, TOTO India, CEAT Tyres, JCB, LM Wind Power, Polycab India, etc.

== Schools and colleges ==
In the city of Halol there are various Gujarati, English and Hindi medium schools. They include Gujarat Natural Farming Science University, V.M English medium school, MGM English medium School Halol(Krishna's School), M S High School, Halol(Gujarati Medium), Saraswati Vidya Mandir, Halol (Gujarati / English Medium), Kalrav English/Gujarati School Halol, Veer New Look Central School Halol (CBSE), M&V Commerce and Arts College Halol and Nutan Kedavni trust School (Gujarati Med.).

== Places of interest ==
- Lucky Studio is a movie studio located in Maghasar village, Halol, Panchmahal district, Gujarat, India, about 3km from Halol. It was founded in 1950 by the late Shri Ibrahim Nadiadwala. Samay Ni Santa Kukdi (1969), Desh Re Joya Dada Pardesh Joya (1998), Maiyar Ma Mandu Nathi Lagtu (2001), Superhit Film, and other Gujarati films have been produced in this studio. It has produced over 100 films in Gujarati and Hindi.
- Tomb of Sikandar Shah
