= Jaisalmer =

- City
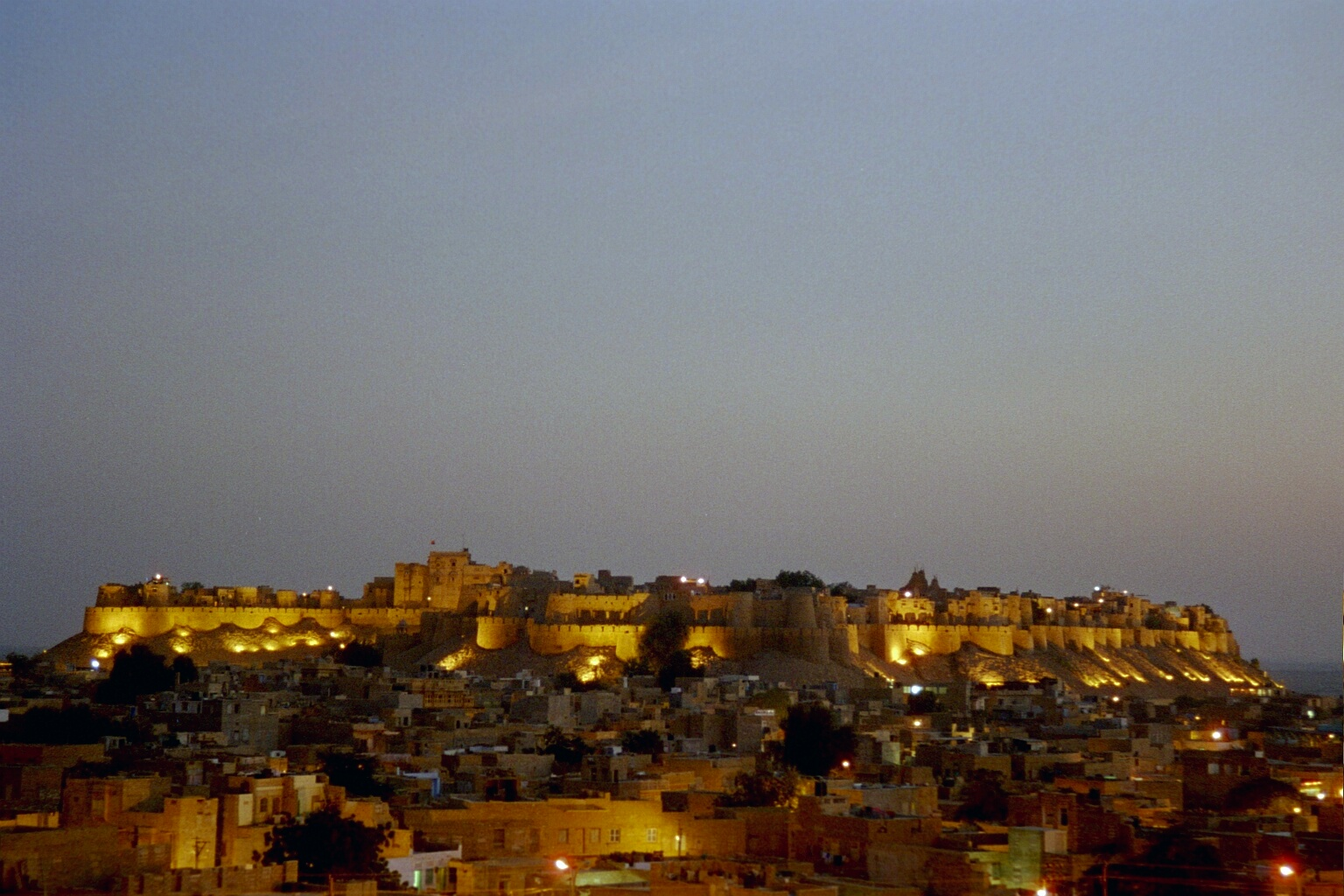
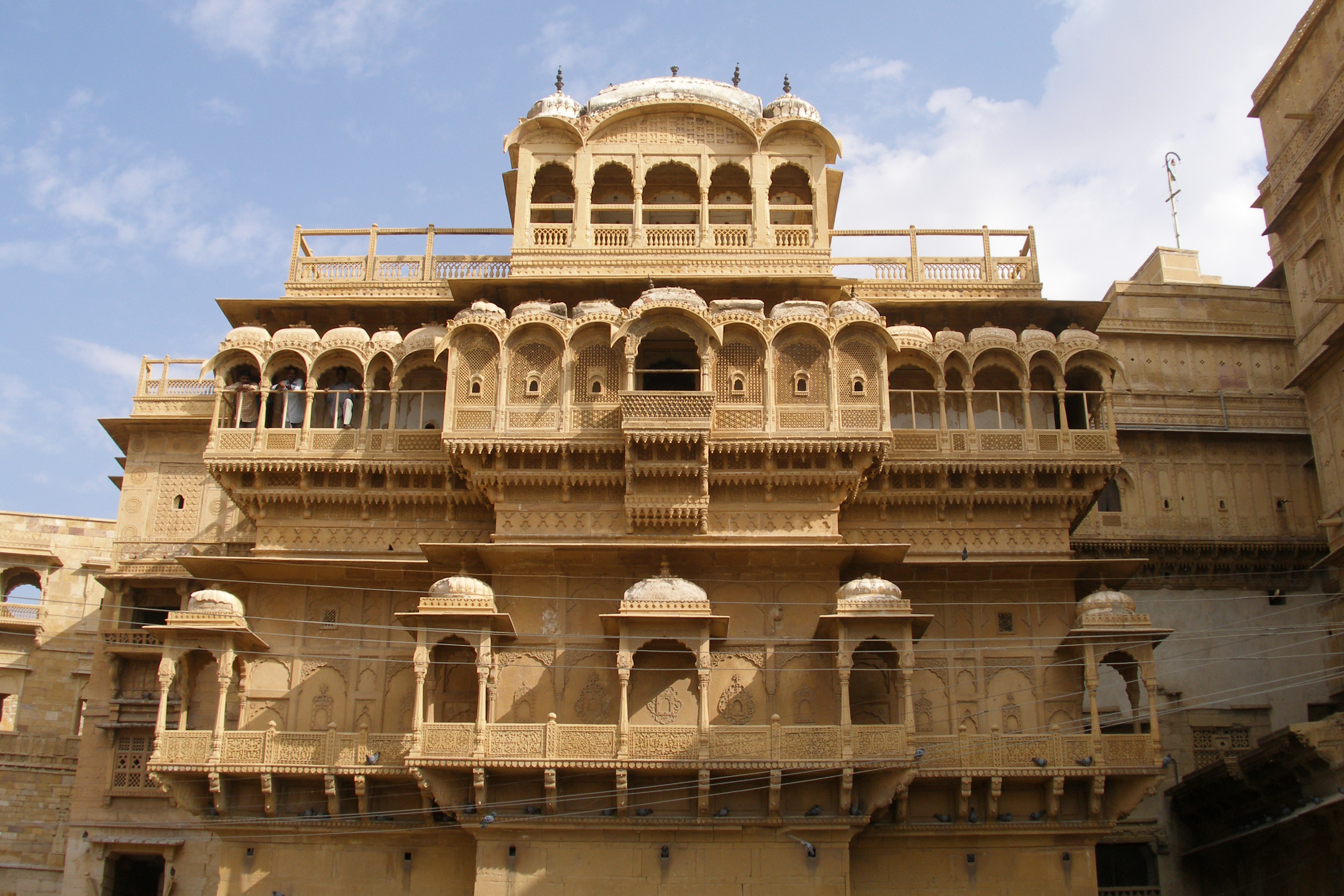
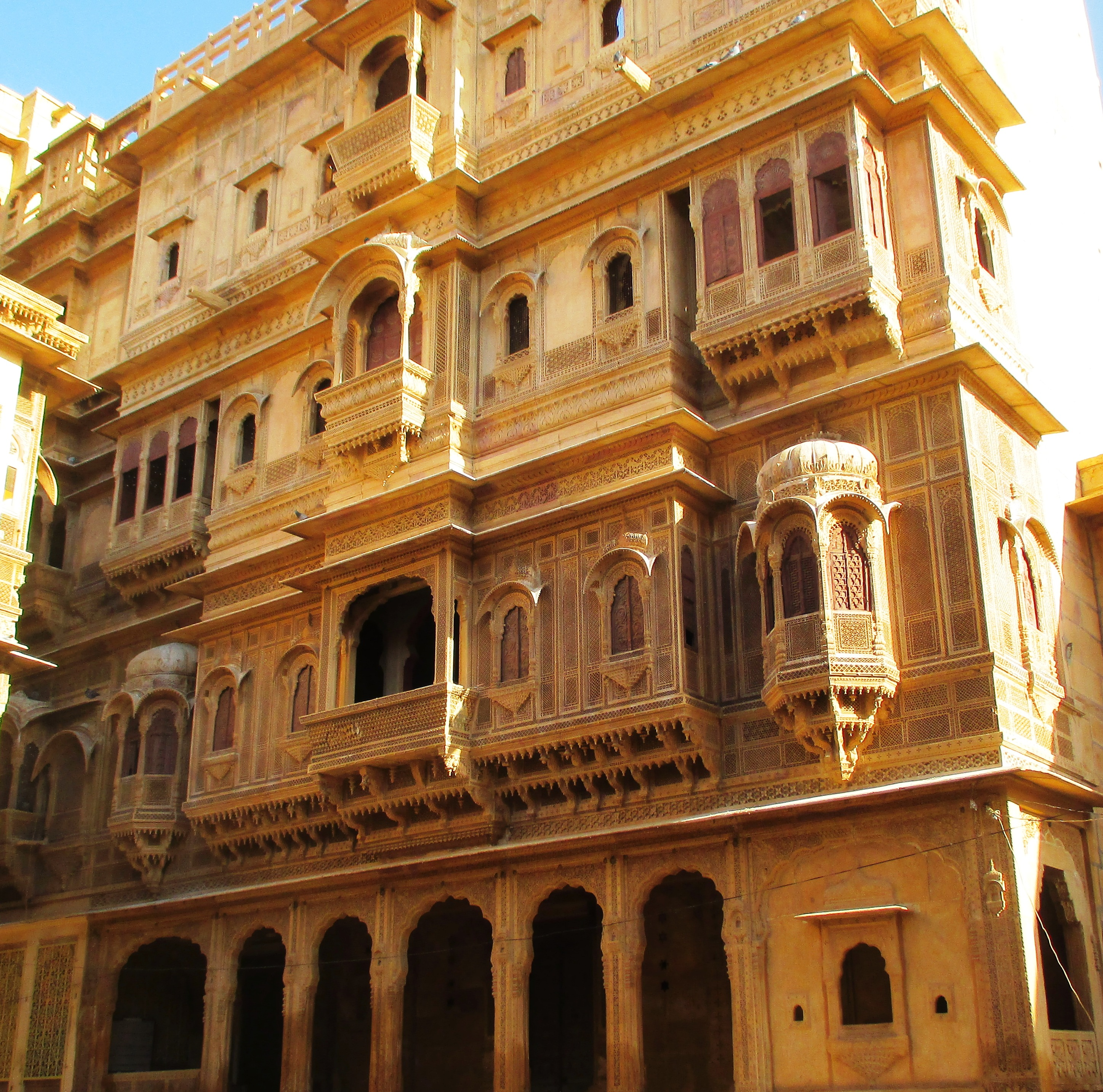
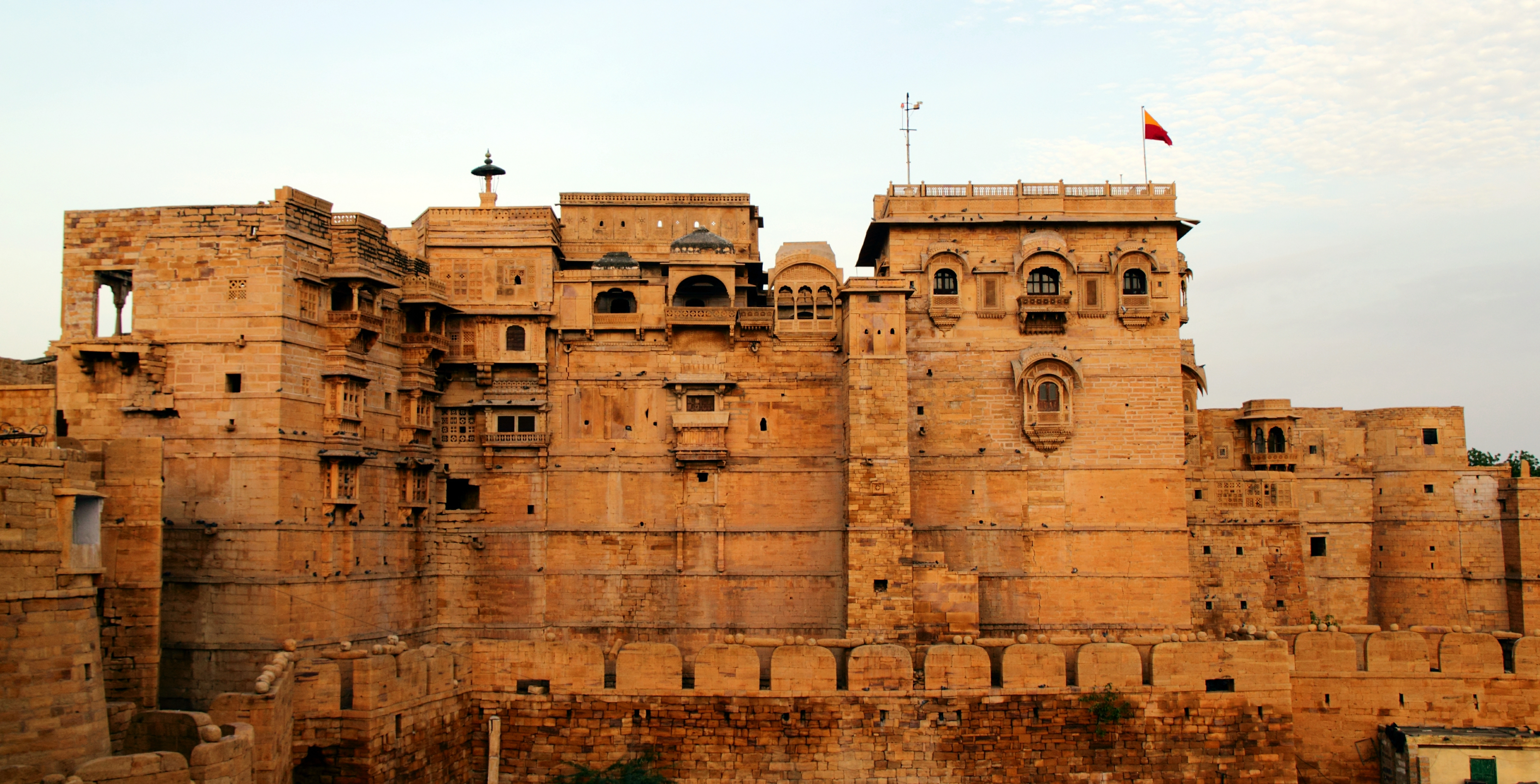
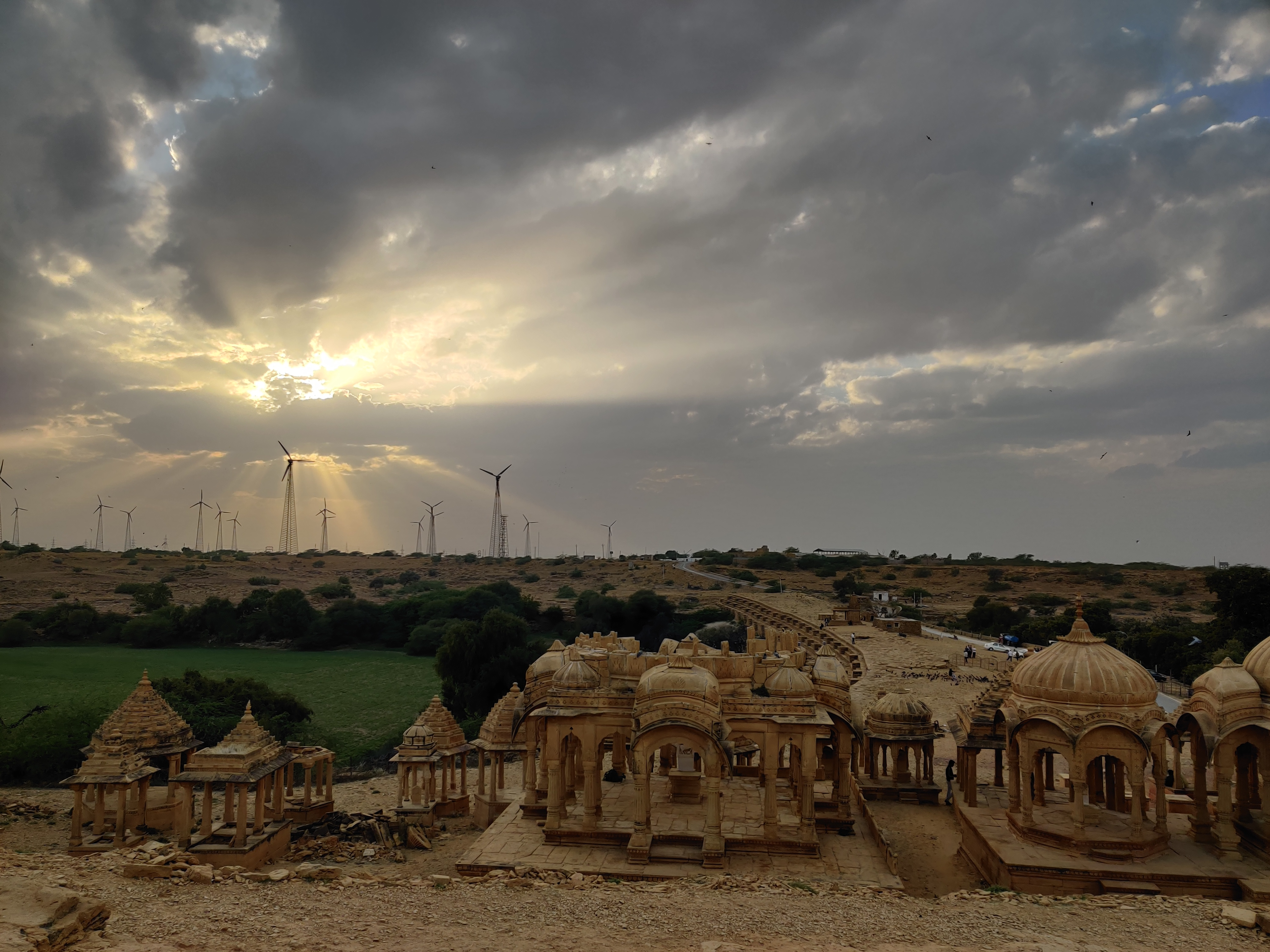
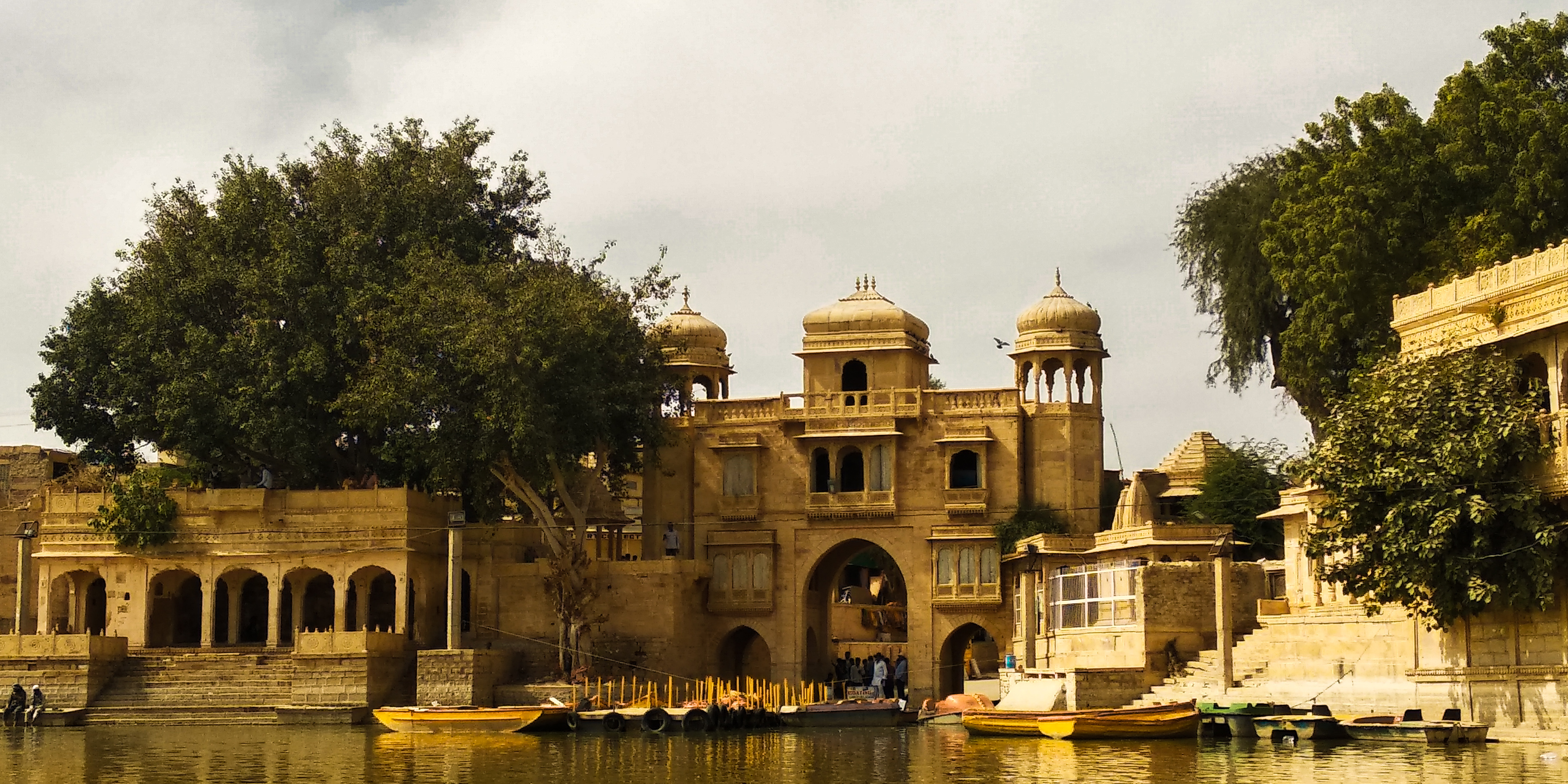
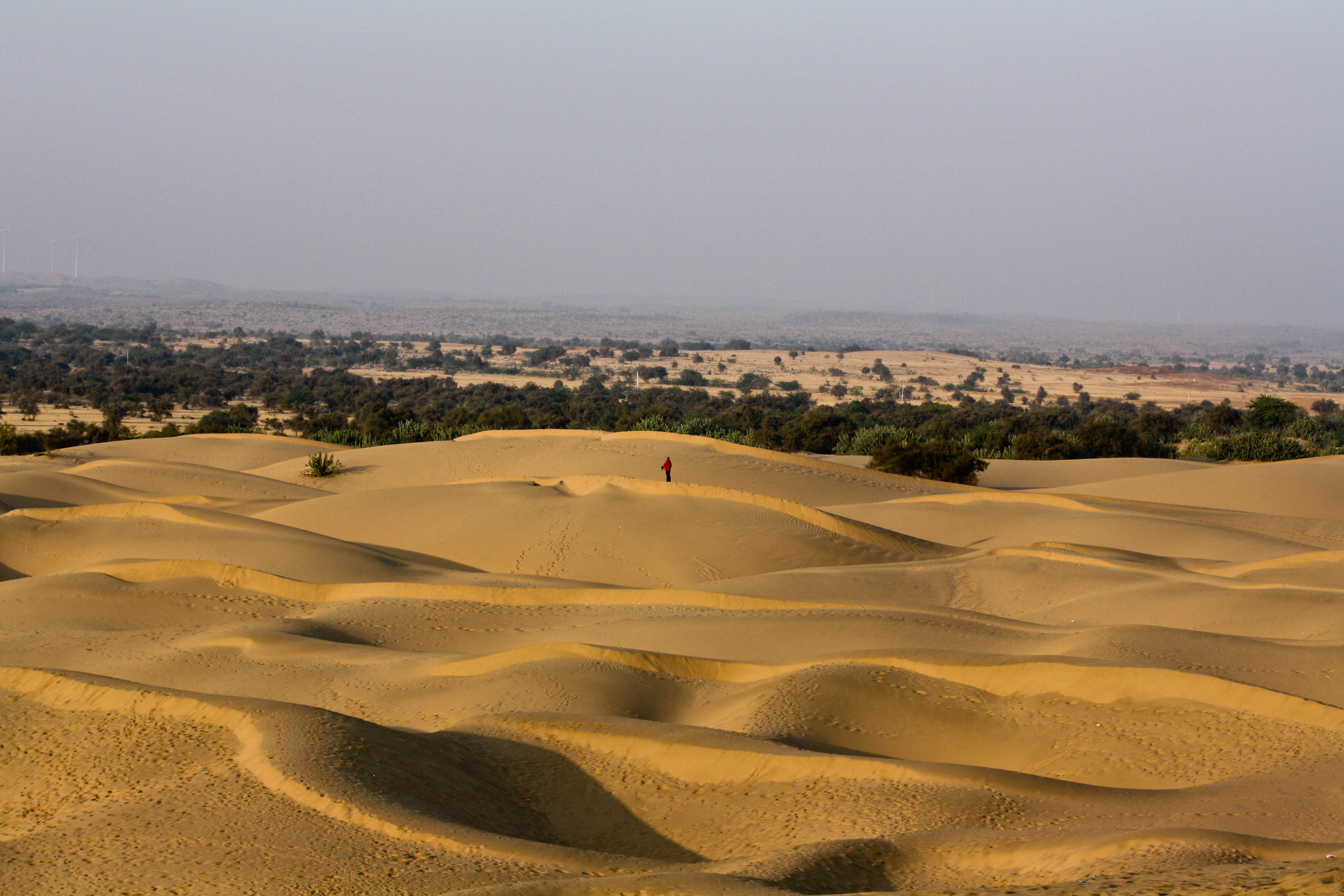
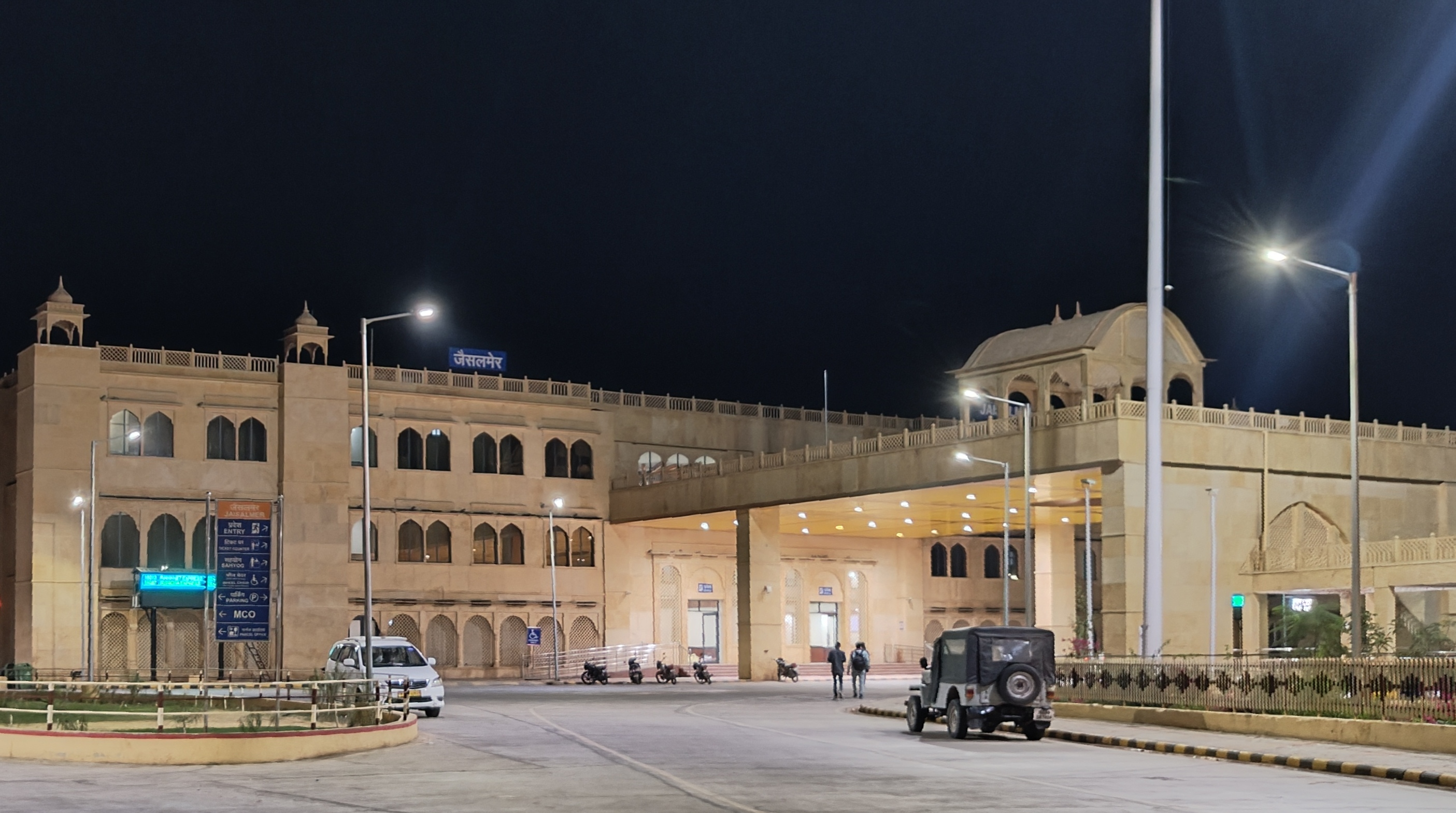
- Jaisalmer Fort Nathmal's Haveli Patwa Haveli Fort Palace Bada Bagh Gadisar Lake Thar Desert Sand Dunes Jaisalmer railway station
- Nicknames: The Golden City, The Yellow City, Swarna Nagari
- Interactive map of Jaisalmer
- Location in Rajasthan, India Jaisalmer (India) Jaisalmer (Asia)
- Coordinates: 26.913°N 70.915°E
- Country: India
- State: Rajasthan
- District: Jaisalmer
- Established: 1156; 870 years ago
- Founder: Rawal Jaisal
- Named for: Rawal Jaisal

Government
  - Type: Municipal Council
  - Body: Jaisalmer Municipal Council

Area
  - Urban: 62.38 km^{2} (24.09 sq mi)
- Elevation: 225 m (738 ft)

Population (2011)
  - City: 65,471

Languages
  - Official: Hindi
  - Additional official: English
  - Regional: Marwari, Rajasthani
- Time zone: UTC+5:30 (IST)
- PIN: 345 001
- Telephone code: 02992
- ISO 3166 code: RJ-IN
- Vehicle registration: RJ-15
- Website: Jaisalmer Municipal Council; Jaisalmer District

Jaisalmer (IPA: [d͡ʒɛːsəlmeːɾ]), nicknamed The Golden City, is a city in the north-western Indian state of Rajasthan, located 575 kilometres (357 mi) west of the state capital Jaipur, in the heart of the Thar Desert. It serves as the administrative headquarters of Jaisalmer district. Jaisalmer is a former medieval trading center and the historic capital of the kingdom of Jaisalmer, founded in 1156 by Rawal Jaisal of the Bhati clan of Rajputs. Jaisalmer stands on a ridge of yellowish sandstone and is crowned by the World Heritage Site, Jaisalmer Fort, a sprawling hilltop citadel supported by 99 bastions. This fort contains a royal palace and several ornate Jain temples. Many of the houses and temples of both the fort and of the town below are built of finely sculptured yellow sandstone. The town has a population, including the residents of the fort, of about 78,000. Jaisalmer ranked 9th on Booking.com's Top 10 The Most Welcoming cities in the world. It is the only Indian city on the list.

== Etymology ==
Jaisalmer was founded by Rawal Jaisal, in 1156 AD. It is named after its founder, with "Jaisal" representing the king's name and the term "Mer" or "Meru" is of Sanskrit origin, signifying a mountain or a high, prominent place, and it has been historically used in the names of various geographical features and landmarks, like Ajmer.

== History ==
=== Medieval history ===
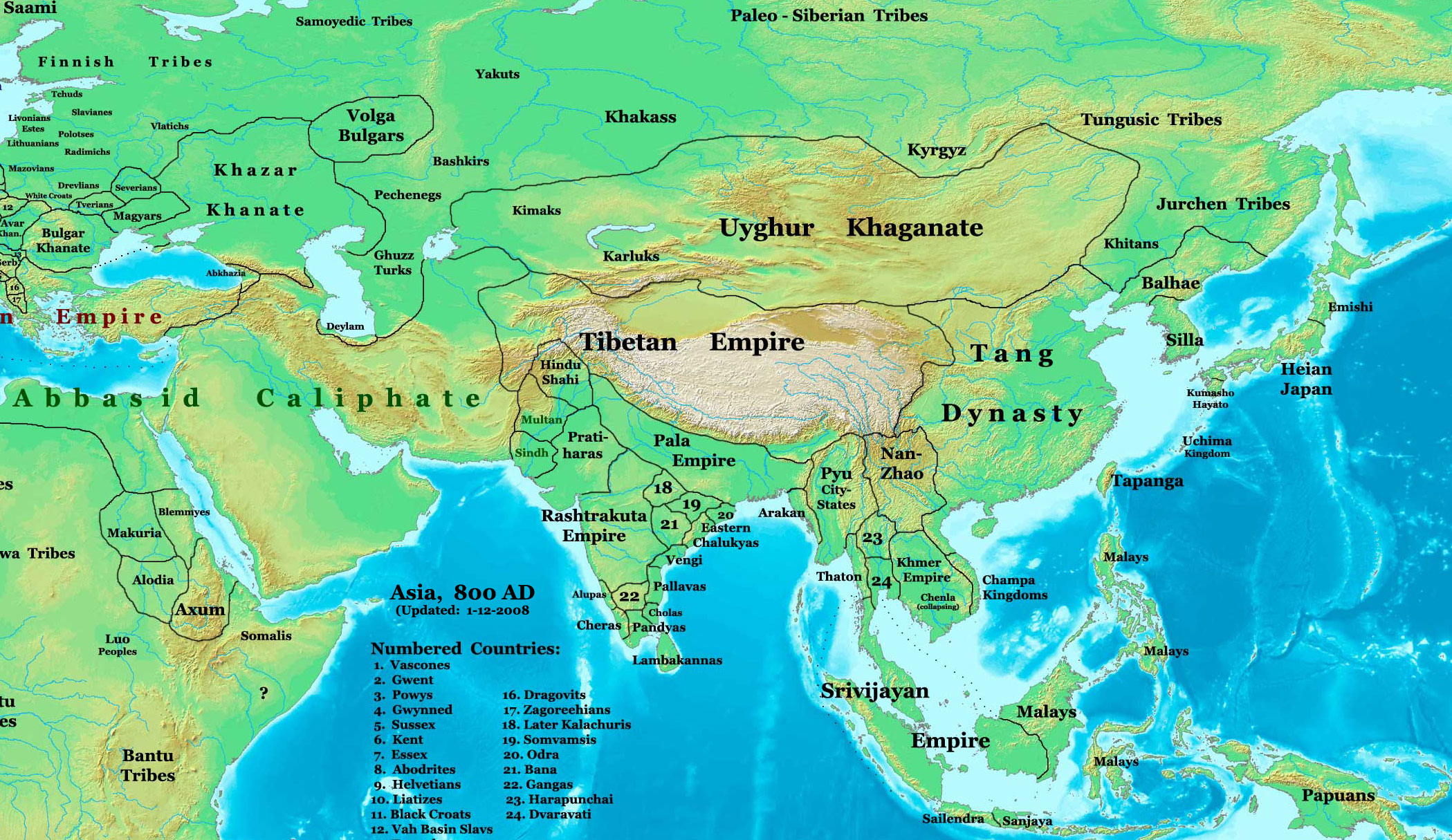
The Bhati kingdom, marked as Multan in 800 CE

The state of Jaisalmer had its foundations in what remains of the Empire ruled by the Bhati dynasty. Early Bhati rulers ruled over large empire stretching from Ghazni in modern-day Afghanistan to Sialkot, Lahore and Rawalpindi in modern-day Pakistan to Bhatinda, Muktsar and Hanumangarh in modern-day India. The empire crumbled over time because of continuous invasions from Central Asia. According to Satish Chandra, the Hindu Shahis of Afghanistan made an alliance with the Bhati rulers of Multhan, because they wanted to end the slave raids made by the Turkic ruler of Ghazni, however the alliance was defeated by Alp Tigin in 977 CE. Bhati dominions continued to be shifted towards the South as they ruled Multan, then finally got pushed into Cholistan and Jaisalmer where Rawal Devaraja built Dera Rawal / Derawar. Jaisalmer was the new capital founded in 1156 by Rawal Jaisal and the state took its name from the capital.

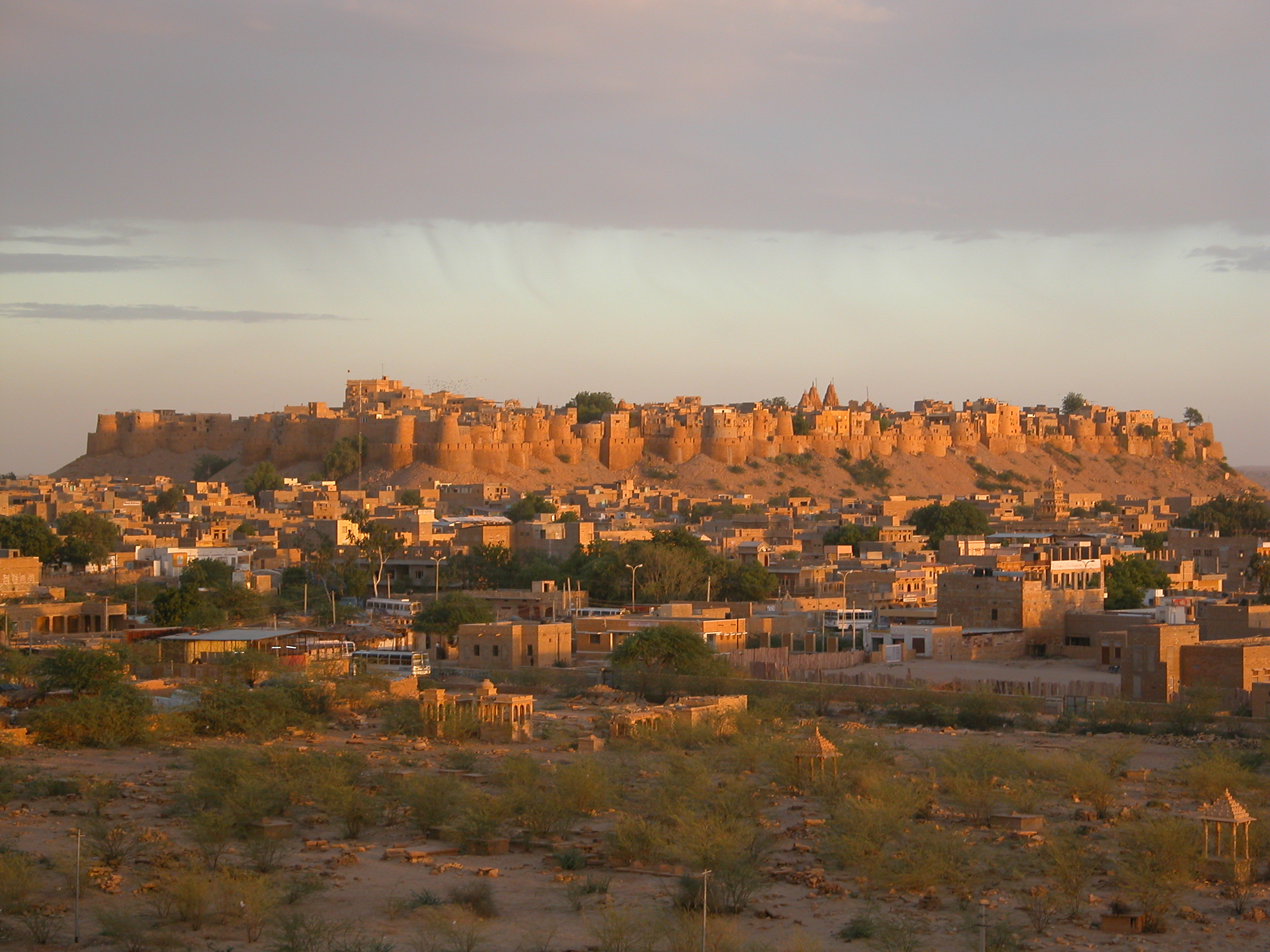
Jaisalmer Fort, built in 1156 AD by the Rajput Rawal (ruler) Jaisal.

=== Modern history ===
On 11 December 1818 Jaisalmer became a British protectorate in the Rajputana Agency.

Traditionally, in the Middle Ages, the main source of income for the kingdom was levies on caravans, but the economy was heavily affected when Bombay emerged as a major port and sea trade replaced the traditional land routes. Ranjit Singh and Bairi Sal Singh attempted to turn around the economic decline but the dramatic reduction in trade impoverished the kingdom. A severe drought and the resulting famine from 1895 to 1900, during the reign of Salivahan Singh, only made matters worse by causing widespread loss of the livestock that the increasingly agriculturally based kingdom relied upon.

The attempts of Jawahir Singh (1914–1949) at modernisation were also not entirely successful in turning the kingdom's economy around, and the drylands of Jaisalmer remained backward compared with other regions of Rajputana, especially the neighbouring state of Jodhpur. Nonetheless, the extensive water storage and supply, sanitation, and health infrastructures developed in the 1930s by the prime minister Brijmohan Nath Zutshi provided significant relief during the severe droughts of 1941 and 1951. During 1930–1947, Jawahir Singh and his ministers also promoted technical education and the academic disciplines of civil and mechanical engineering in the state.

After the departure of the British from India in 1947, Jawahir Singh signed an Instrument of Accession to the new Union of India, while retaining some internal autonomy until the 1950s.

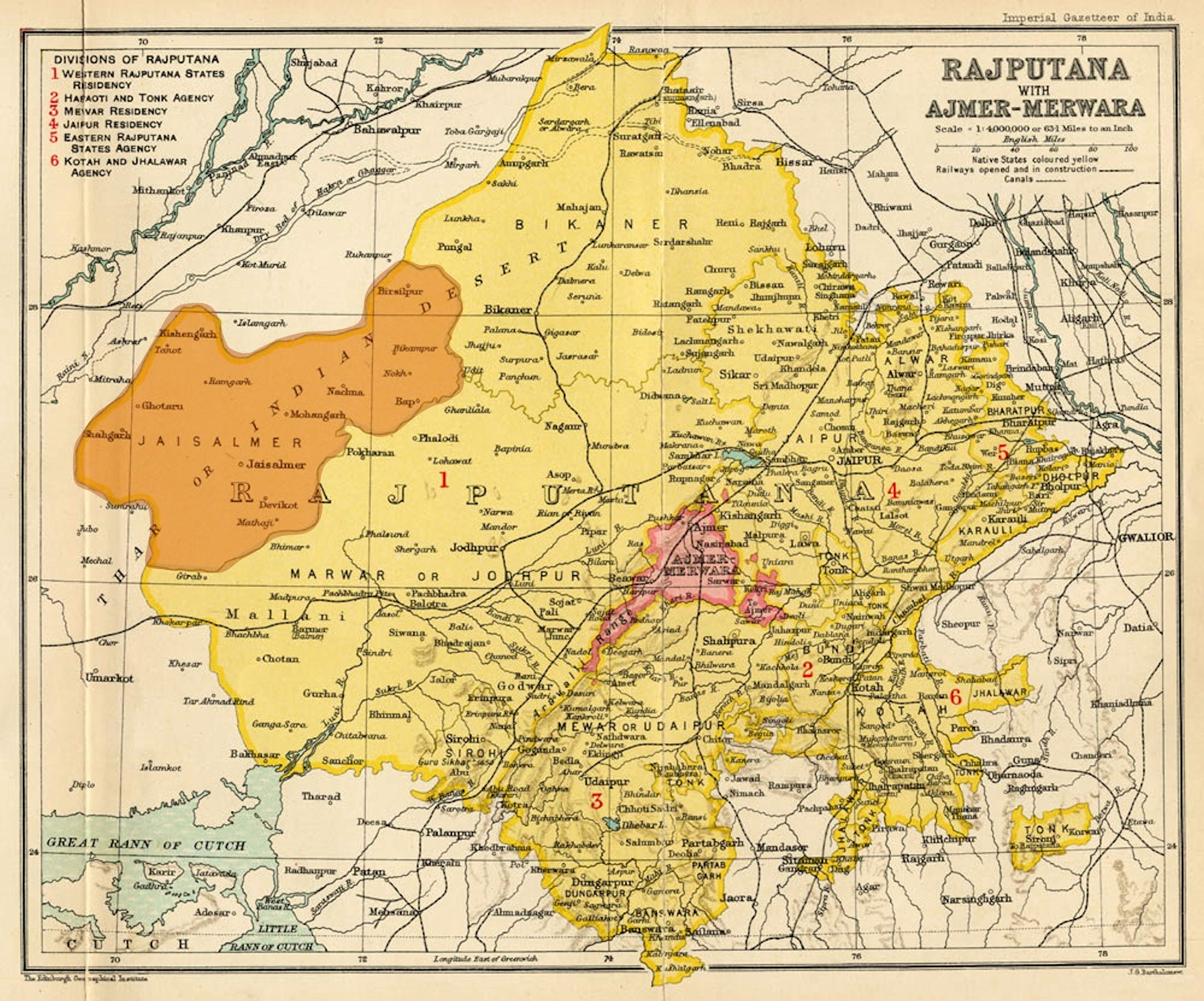
Jailsalmer State (orange) within Rajputana (yellow), 1909.

Jaisalmer Flag

== Geography ==
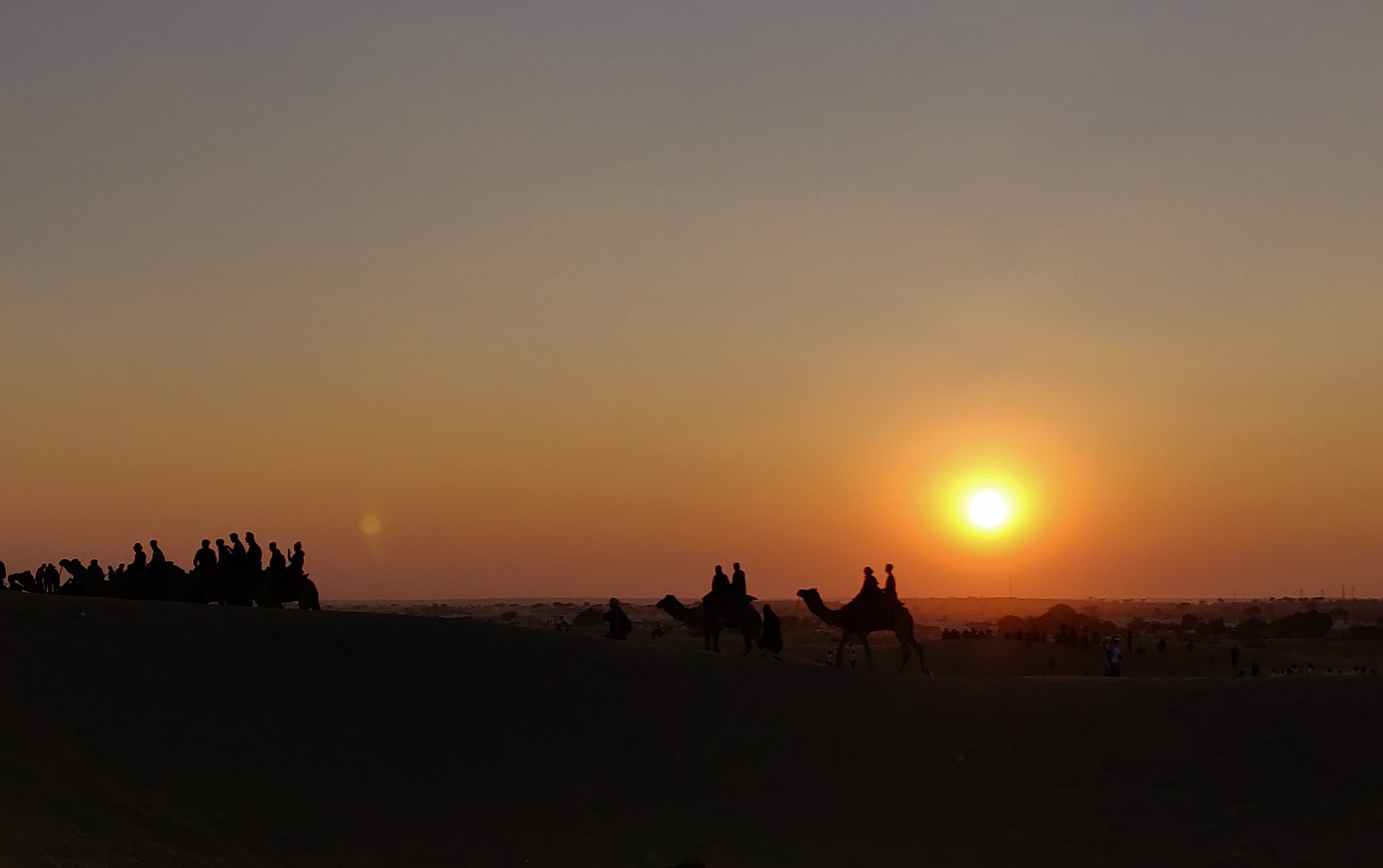
Sam sand dunes near Jaisalmer

=== Climate ===
Jaisalmer has a hot arid climate (Köppen BWh), and is thus prone to extremes of temperature. The temperature varies greatly from day to night in both summer and winter. The maximum summer temperature is around 40 °C (104 °F) while the minimum is 25 °C (77 °F). The maximum winter temperature is usually around 23.6 °C (74.5 °F) and the minimum is −5 °C (23 °F). The highest ever recorded temperature was 50 °C (122 °F); the lowest ever recorded temperature being −5.9 °C (21.4 °F). Temperatures of up to 52.4 °C (126.3 °F) have been recorded near the Pakistani border, but the standard conditions of this temperature recording remain unverified.

The average rainfall is 256.5 millimetres (10.10 in), although as with all of northwest India it is almost exclusively confined to the monsoon from June to September and extremely variable from year to year. As little as 20.8 millimetres or 0.82 inches was recorded in 1969, but as much as 555.7 millimetres or 21.88 inches in 2006, of which 440.6 millimetres (17.35 in) fell in August alone. The highest daily rainfall is 204.8 millimetres or 8.06 inches on 16 August 1973. Even during the monsoon rainfall typically occurs only on two or three days per month, and then for only a few hours each rainy day. It is estimated that in an average year rain falls in Jaisalmer for a total of fewer than twenty hours.

Climate data for Jaisalmer (1991–2020, extremes 1948–present)
Month	Jan	Feb	Mar	Apr	May	Jun	Jul	Aug	Sep	Oct	Nov	Dec	Year
Record high °C (°F)	35.8 (96.4)	37.8 (100.0)	42.7 (108.9)	46.2 (115.2)	49.0 (120.2)	49.2 (120.6)	47.1 (116.8)	43.3 (109.9)	43.5 (110.3)	42.2 (108.0)	38.7 (101.7)	34.4 (93.9)	49.2 (120.6)
Mean daily maximum °C (°F)	23.4 (74.1)	27.3 (81.1)	33.4 (92.1)	38.9 (102.0)	42.1 (107.8)	41.1 (106.0)	38.4 (101.1)	36.6 (97.9)	36.9 (98.4)	36.4 (97.5)	31.2 (88.2)	25.8 (78.4)	34.4 (93.9)
Daily mean °C (°F)	16.4 (61.5)	20.5 (68.9)	26.3 (79.3)	31.1 (88.0)	34.8 (94.6)	34.5 (94.1)	32.7 (90.9)	31.3 (88.3)	31.1 (88.0)	29.4 (84.9)	23.9 (75.0)	18.4 (65.1)	27.5 (81.6)
Mean daily minimum °C (°F)	9.3 (48.7)	12.5 (54.5)	18.4 (65.1)	23.6 (74.5)	26.5 (79.7)	27.6 (81.7)	27.1 (80.8)	25.9 (78.6)	25.0 (77.0)	22.0 (71.6)	16.2 (61.2)	11.0 (51.8)	20.6 (69.1)
Record low °C (°F)	−5.9 (21.4)	−4.4 (24.1)	3.4 (38.1)	10.6 (51.1)	15.1 (59.2)	18.8 (65.8)	20.1 (68.2)	19.1 (66.4)	12.9 (55.2)	8.3 (46.9)	2.0 (35.6)	−0.6 (30.9)	−5.9 (21.4)
Average rainfall mm (inches)	2.5 (0.10)	4.5 (0.18)	5.4 (0.21)	6.6 (0.26)	14.5 (0.57)	36.2 (1.43)	63.9 (2.52)	79.8 (3.14)	32.9 (1.30)	4.7 (0.19)	0.7 (0.03)	2.2 (0.09)	256.9 (10.11)
Average rainy days	0.4	0.5	0.6	0.5	0.9	1.0	3.5	3.2	1.8	0.4	0.1	0.2	13.1
Average relative humidity (%) (at 17:30 IST)	32	27	23	20	21	31	45	50	41	27	28	31	31
Average dew point °C (°F)	7 (45)	10 (50)	13 (55)	14 (57)	17 (63)	22 (72)	24 (75)	24 (75)	23 (73)	18 (64)	13 (55)	9 (48)	16 (61)
Average ultraviolet index	5	6	8	8	9	8	8	8	8	7	6	4	7
Source 1: India Meteorological Department Time and Date (dewpoints, 2005–2015)
Source 2: Tokyo Climate Center (mean temperatures 1991–2020), Weather Atlas

== Demographics ==
Religions in Jaisalmer City (2011)
Religion	Percent
Hinduism	89.93%
Islam	8.20%
Sikhism	0.54%
Christianity	0.50%
Jainism	0.46%
Buddhism	0.07%

According to the 2011 census, Jaisalmer had a population of 65,471. Around 90% of the population is Hindu, 8.20% is Muslim and the remaining are Sikhs, Christians, and Jains.

== Economy ==
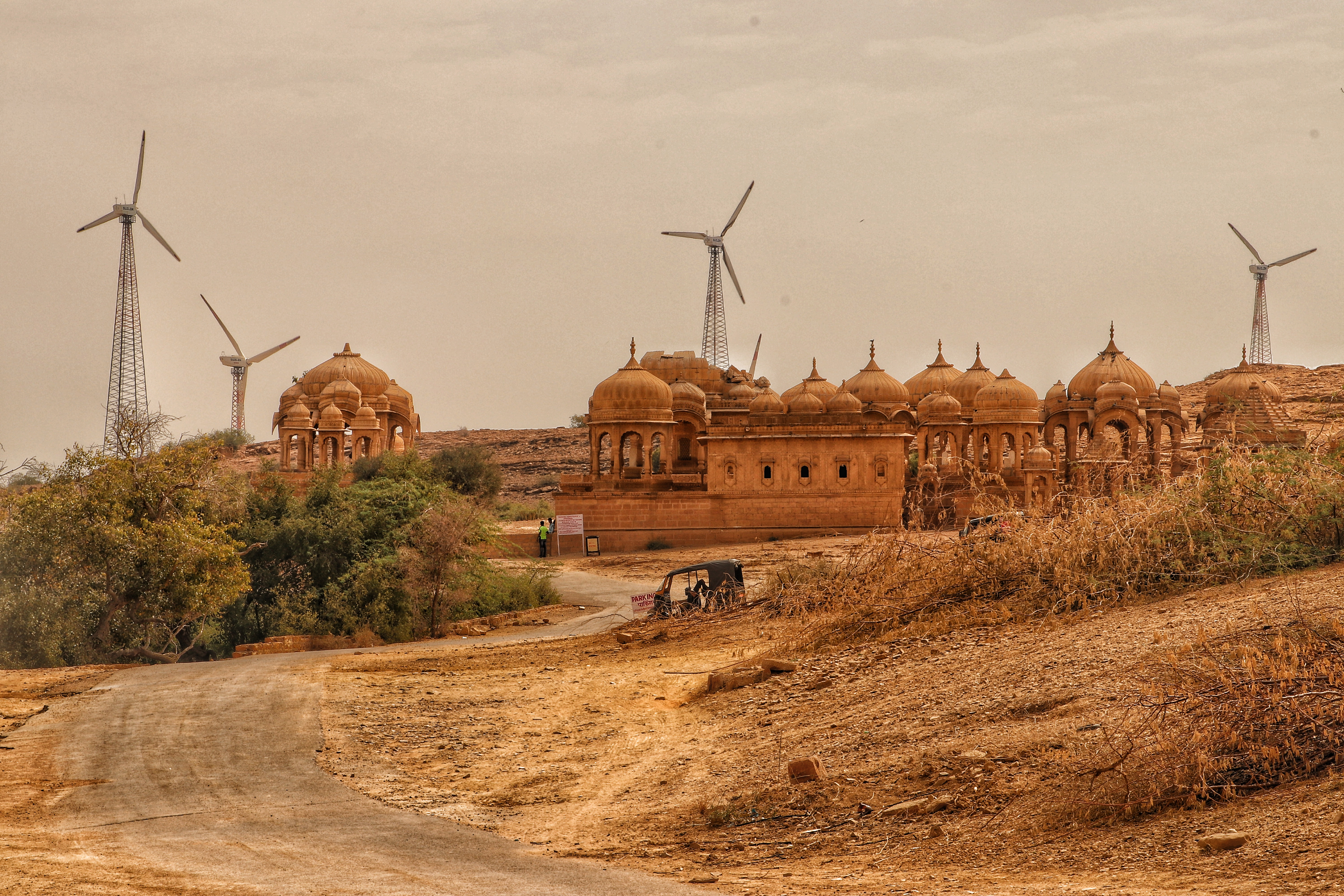
Bada Bagh and windmill farms of Jaisalmer.

Tourism is a major industry in Jaisalmer.

In recent years, there has been a growing focus on renewable energy in the region. Jaisalmer has been home to various wind and solar energy projects, taking advantage of the ample sunlight and wind resources in the desert.

The Government of India initiated departmental exploration for oil in 1955–56 in the Jaisalmer area. Oil India Limited discovered natural gas in 1988 in the Jaisalmer basin.

Musicians and dancers are also a major cultural export from Jaisalmer to the rest of the world. Manganiyar musicians have played the world over, and Queen Harish, a well-known folk dancer and drag queen, has toured the world over and has featured in international movies.

Jaisalmer is also known for its leather messenger bags, made from wild camels native to the area.

== Culture and cityscape ==
=== Jaisalmer Fort ===
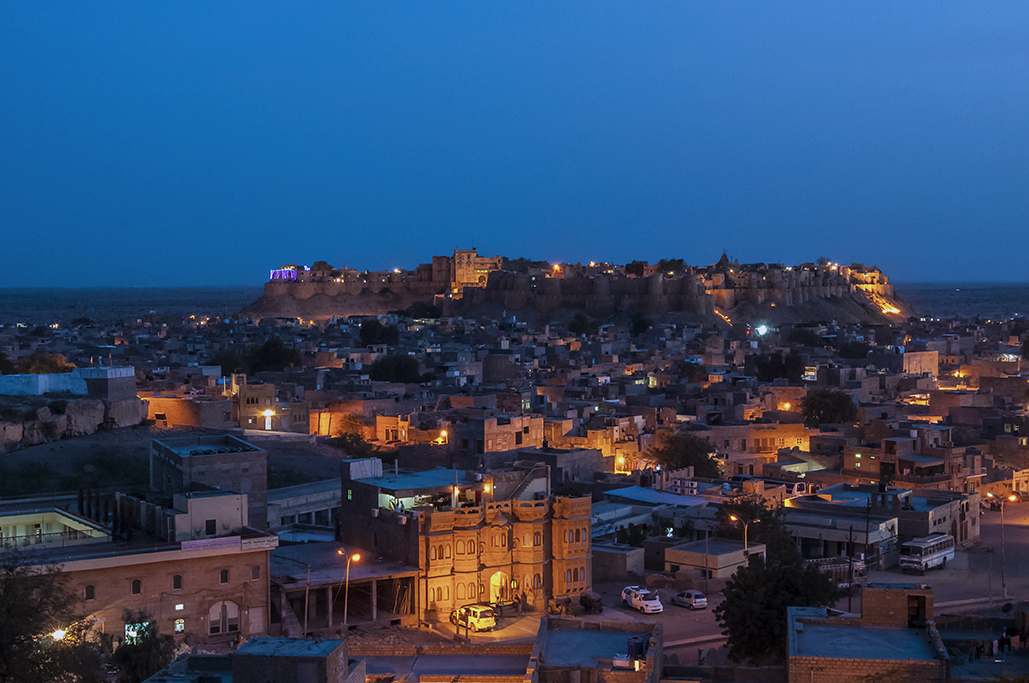
The Jaisalmer fort in Rajasthan.

Built in 1156 by the Bhati Rajput ruler Jaisal, Jaisalmer Fort, situated on Meru Hill and named as Trikoot Garh has been the scene of many battles. Its massive sandstone walls are a pale yellow colour during the day, turning to a darker gold as the sun sets. The famous Indian film director Satyajit Ray wrote a detective novel and later turned it into a film − Sonar Kella (The Golden Fortress) which was based on this fort. About a quarter of city's population still live inside the fort. The main attractions inside the fort are the Raj Mahal (Royal palace), Jain temples and the Laxminath temple.

=== Jain heritage ===
A number of ornate buildings in Jaisalmer were built by its Jain community, including temples, notably the temples dedicated to the 16th Tirthankara, Shantinath, and 23rd Tirthankara, Parshvanath.

There are seven Jain temples in total which are situated within the Jaisalmer fort built during the 12th and 15th centuries. Among these temples, the biggest is the Paraswanath Temple; the others are Chandraprabhu temple, Rishabdev temple, Shitalnath Temple, Kunthunath Temple, and Shantinath Temple. Known for their exquisite work of art and architecture that was predominant in the medieval era the temples are built out of yellow sandstone and have intricate engravings on them.

Jaisalmer has some of the oldest libraries of India which contain the rarest of the manuscripts and artefacts of Jain tradition. There are many pilgrimage centres around Jaisalmer such as Lodhurva Jain temple (Lodarva), Amarsagar, Brahmsar and Pokhran.

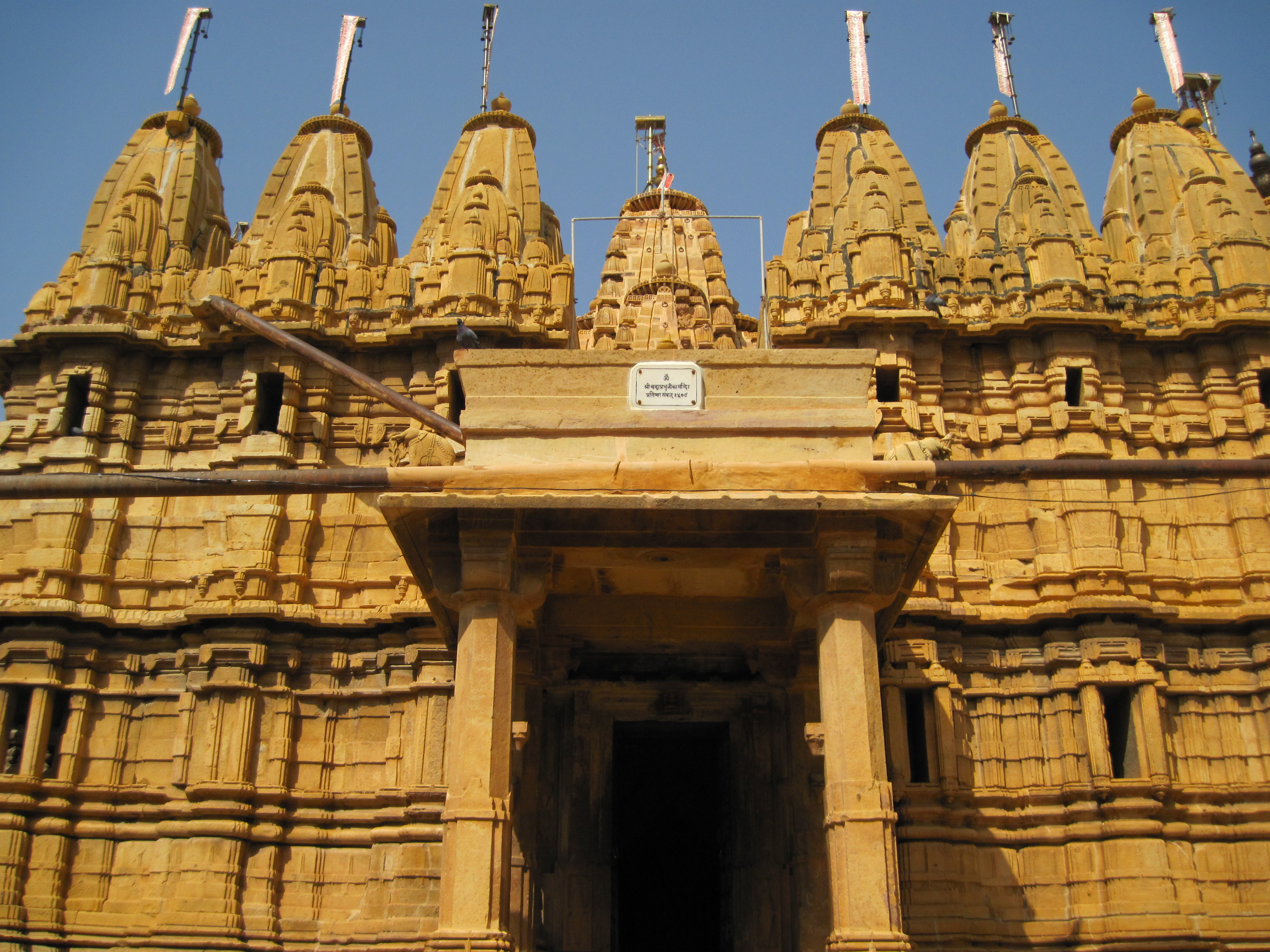
Chandraprabhu Jain Temple inside the Jaisalmer Fort

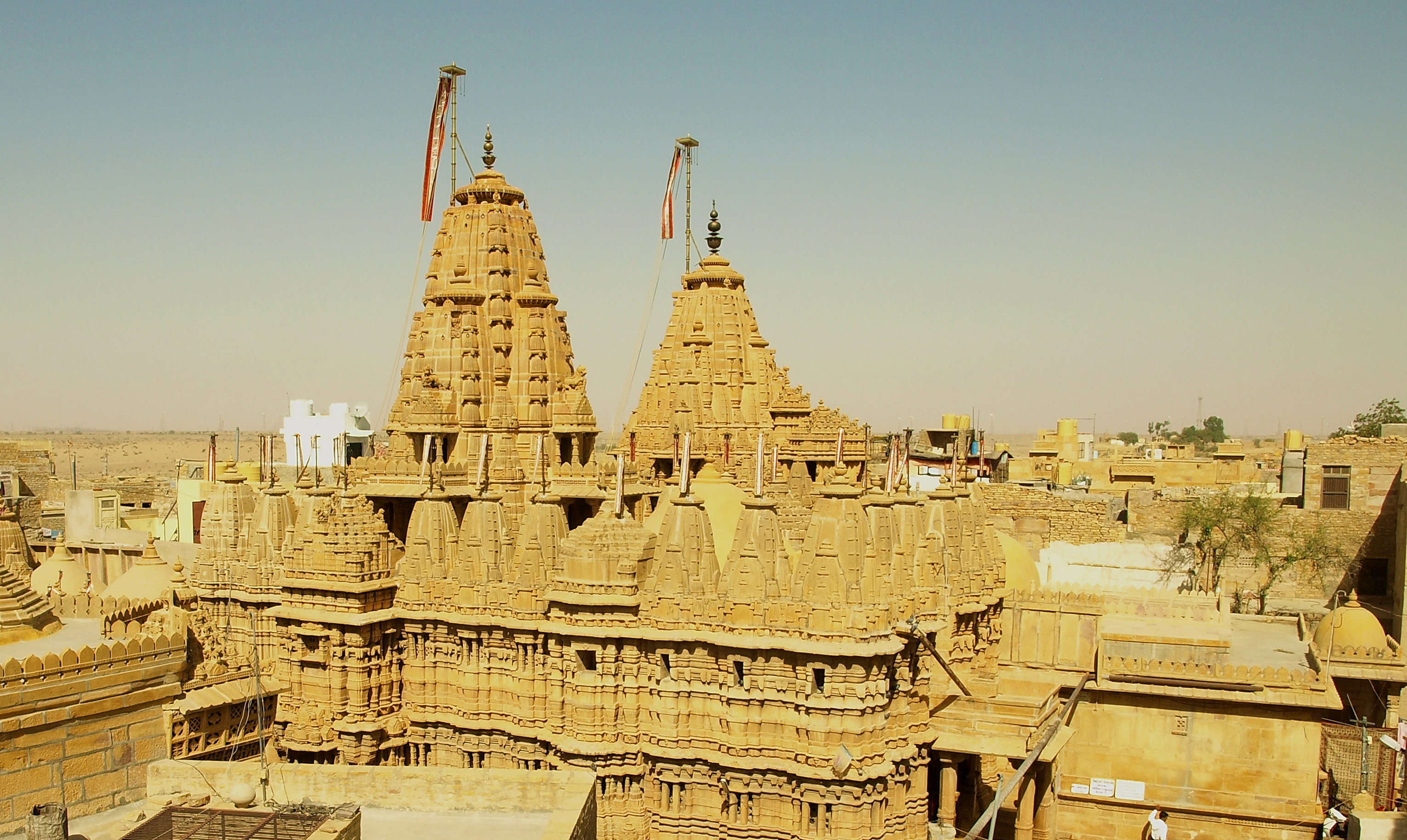
Jain Temple inside the Jaisalmer Fort

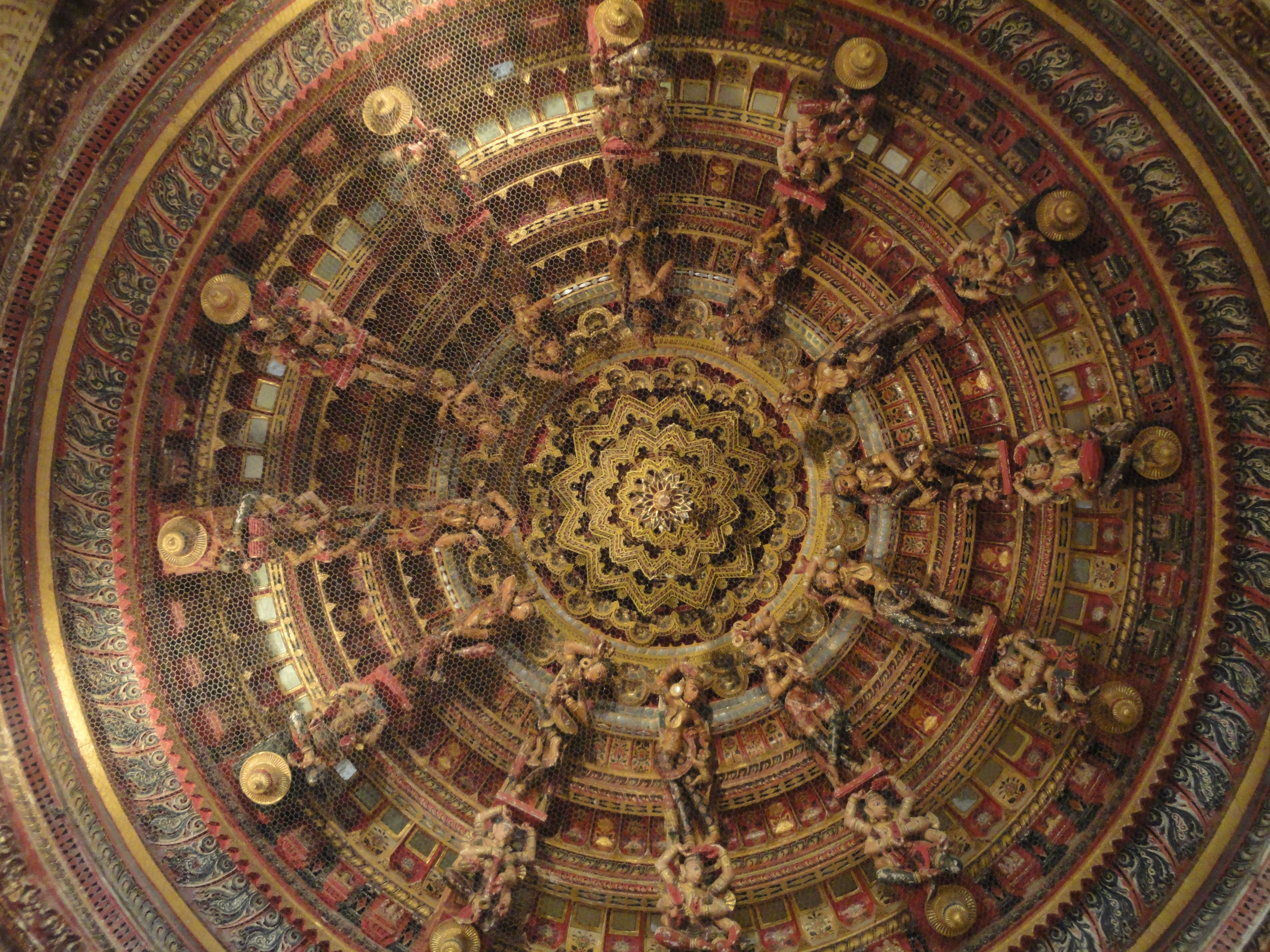
Ceiling of Jain temple inside the Jaisalmer Fort

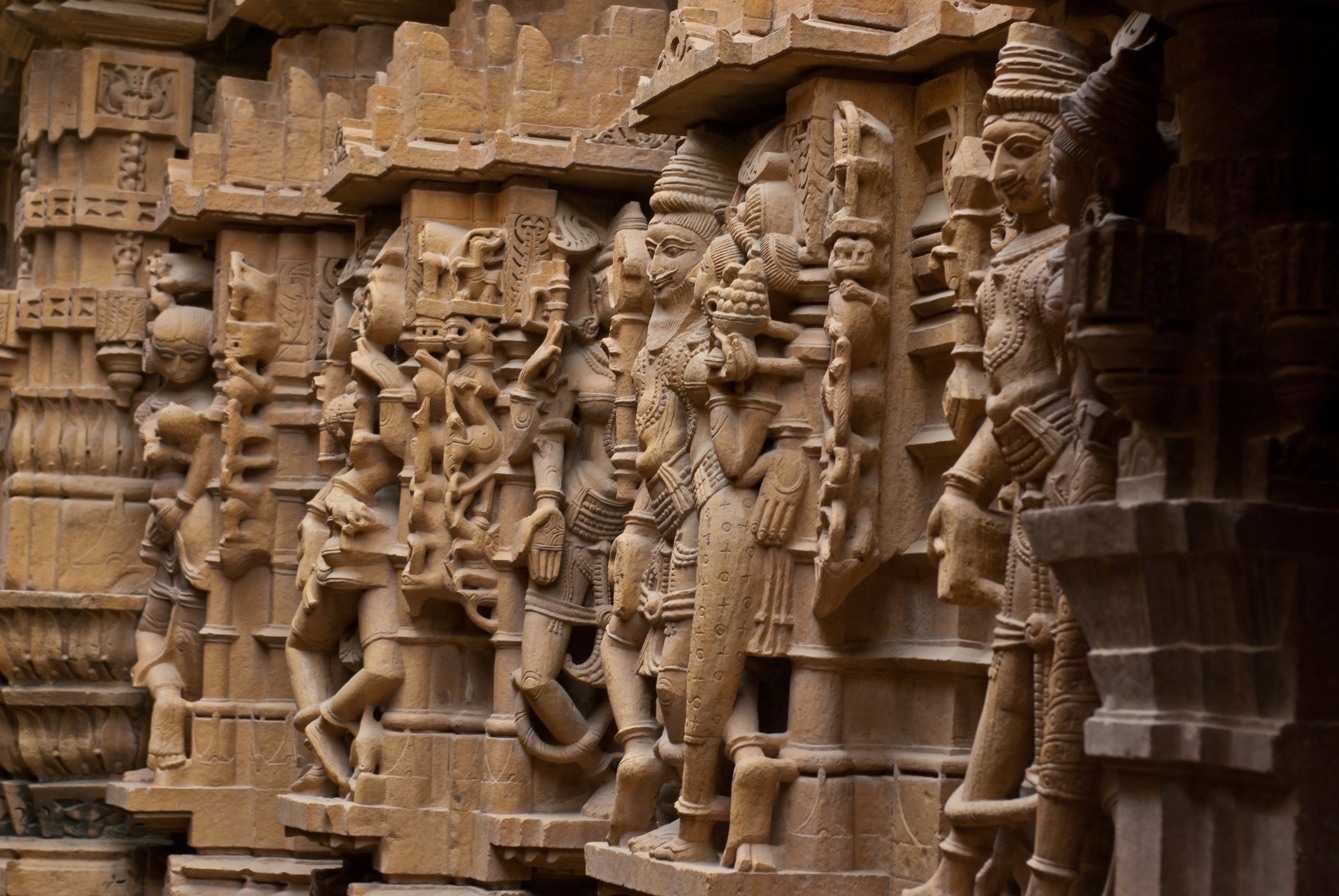
Carving on the wall of Jain Temple, Jaisalmer Fort

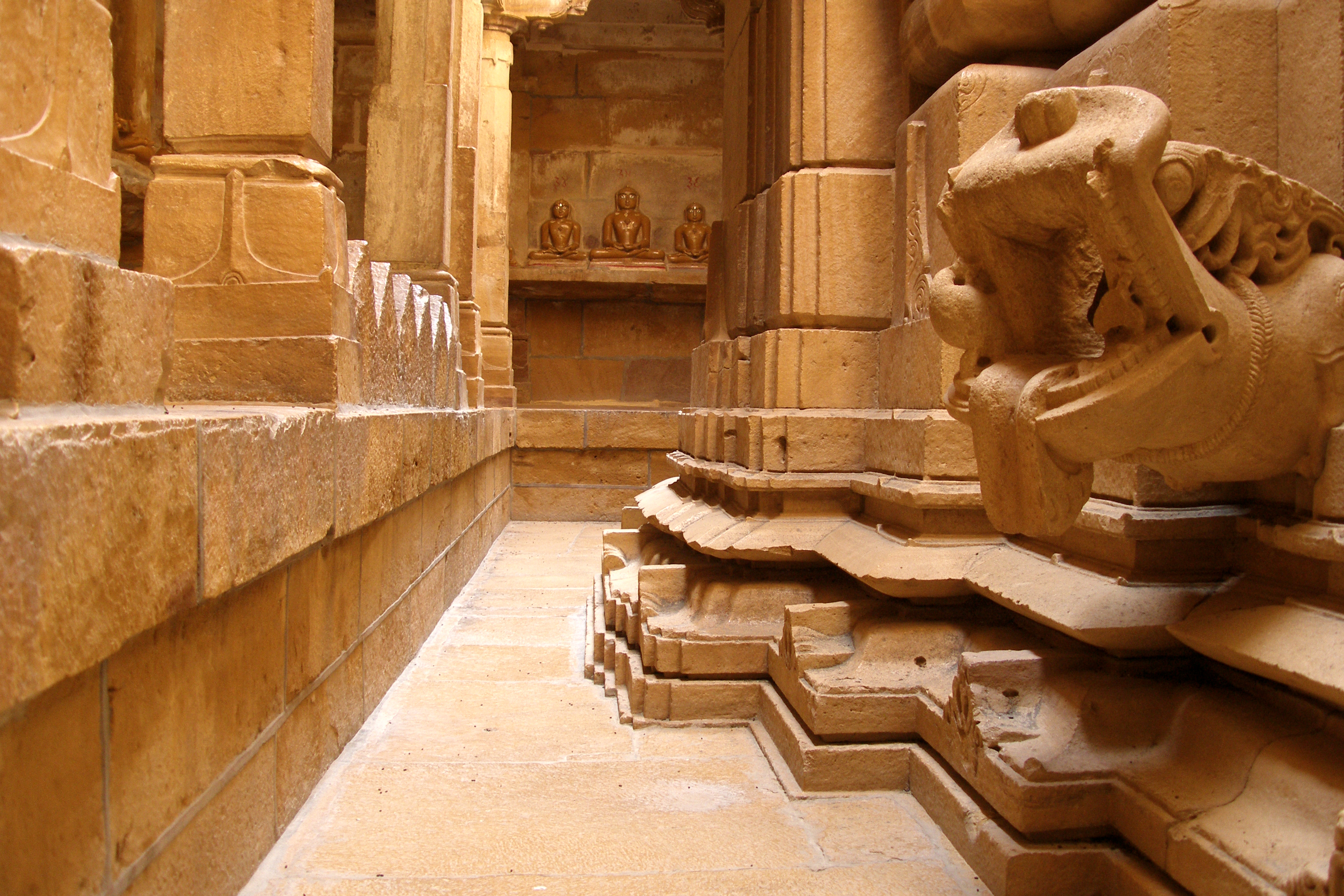
Jain Haveli architecture

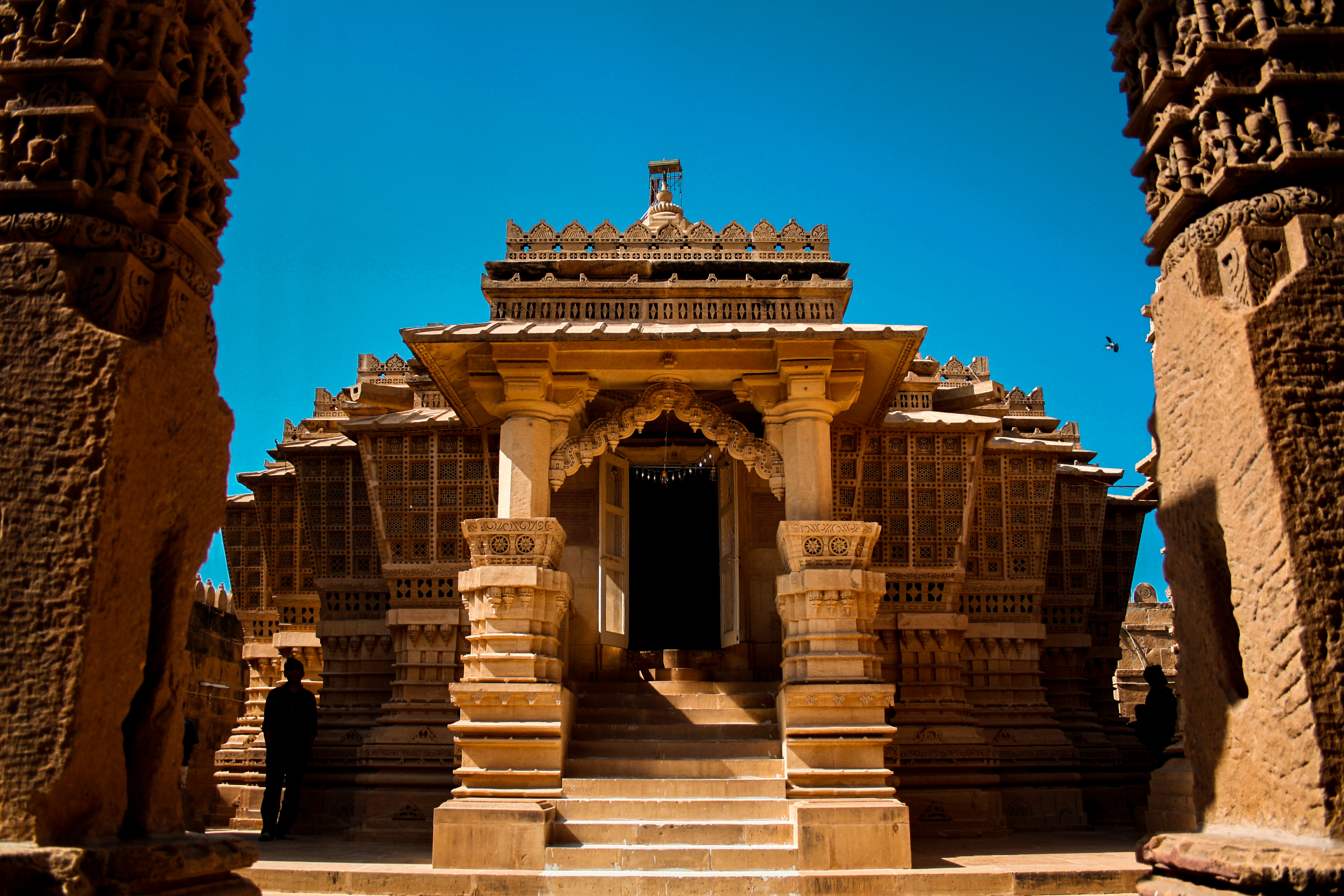
Lodhurva Jain temple

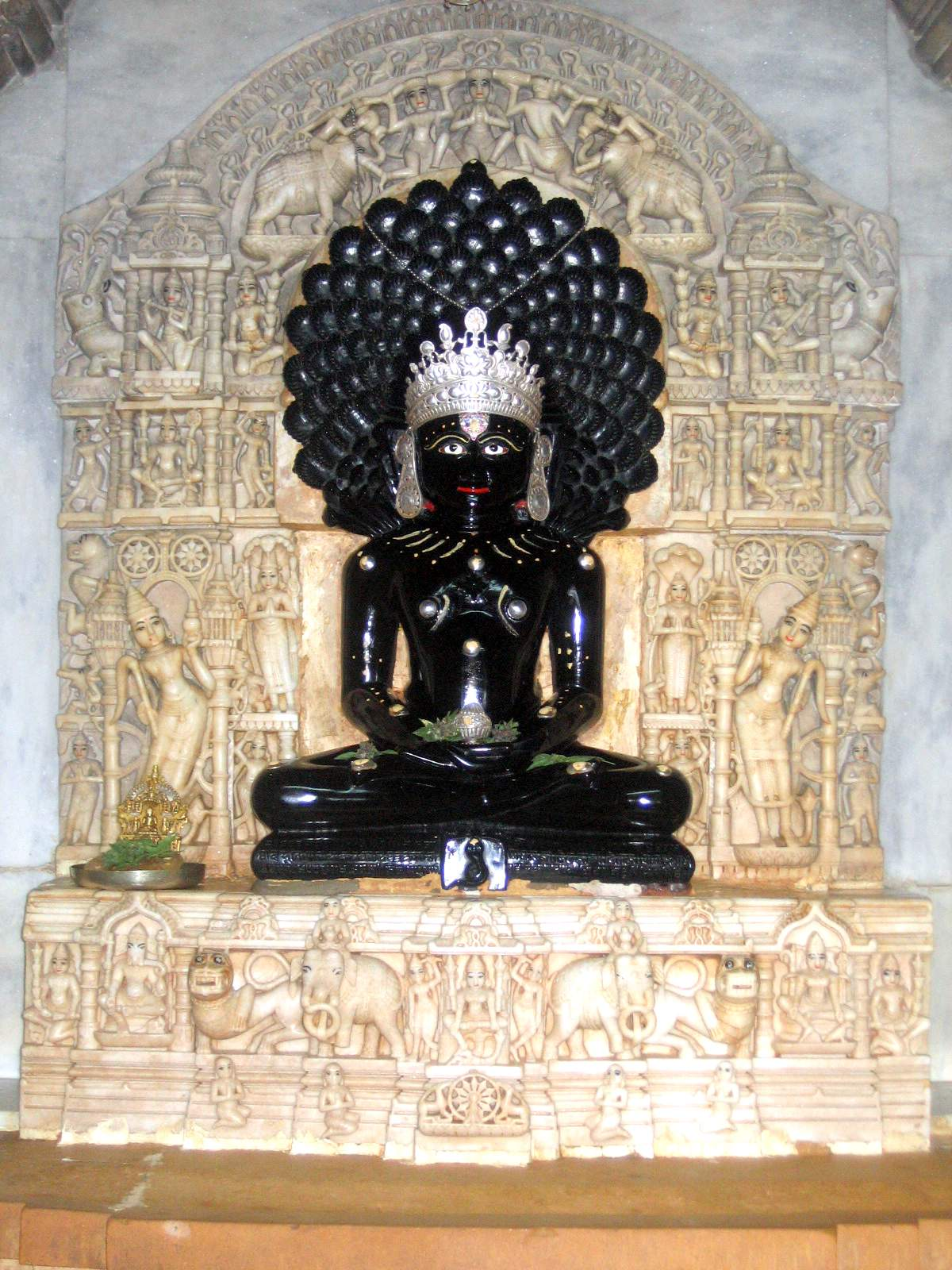
Parshvantha, Lodhruva Jain Temple

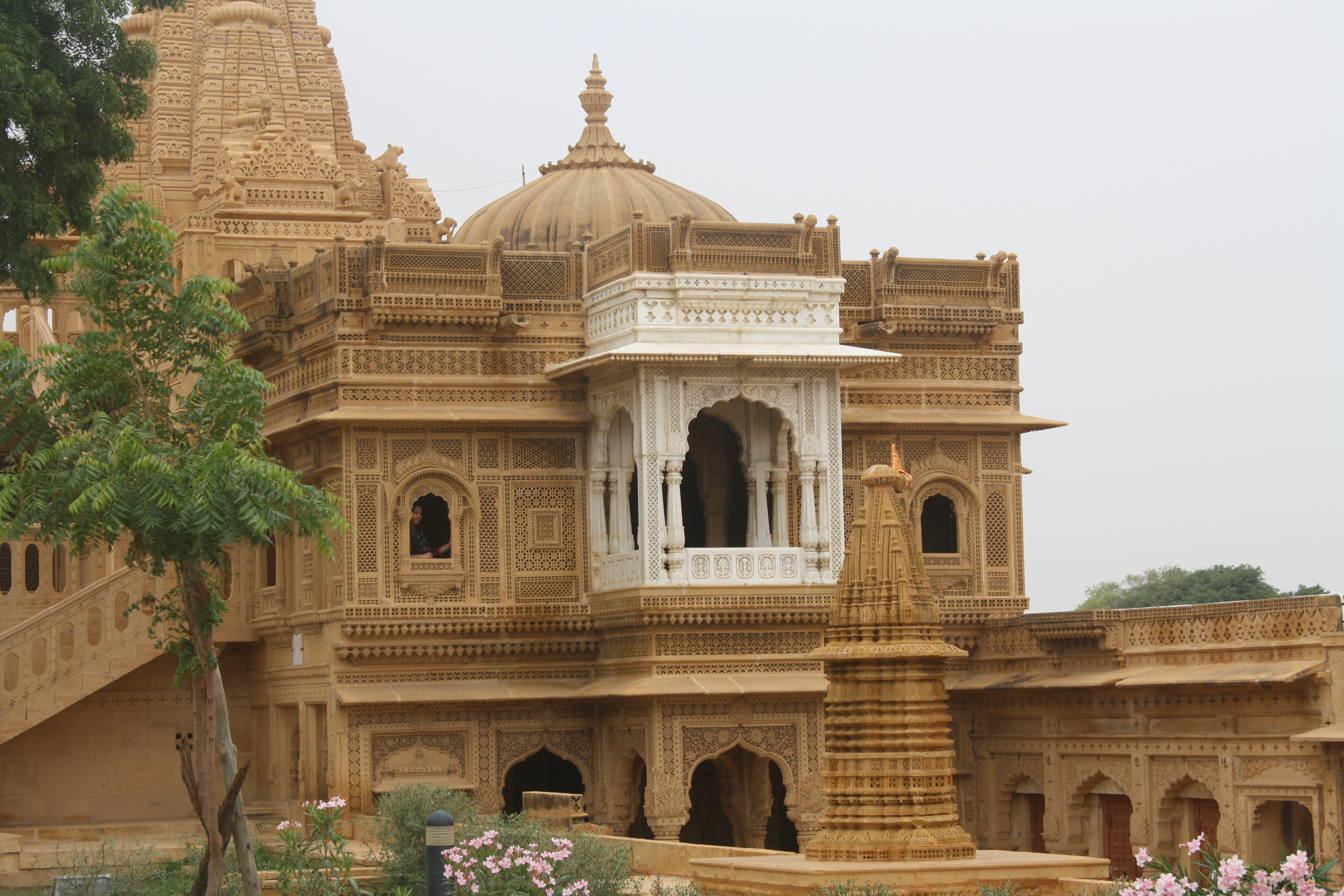
Amar Sagar Jain temple

=== Other ===
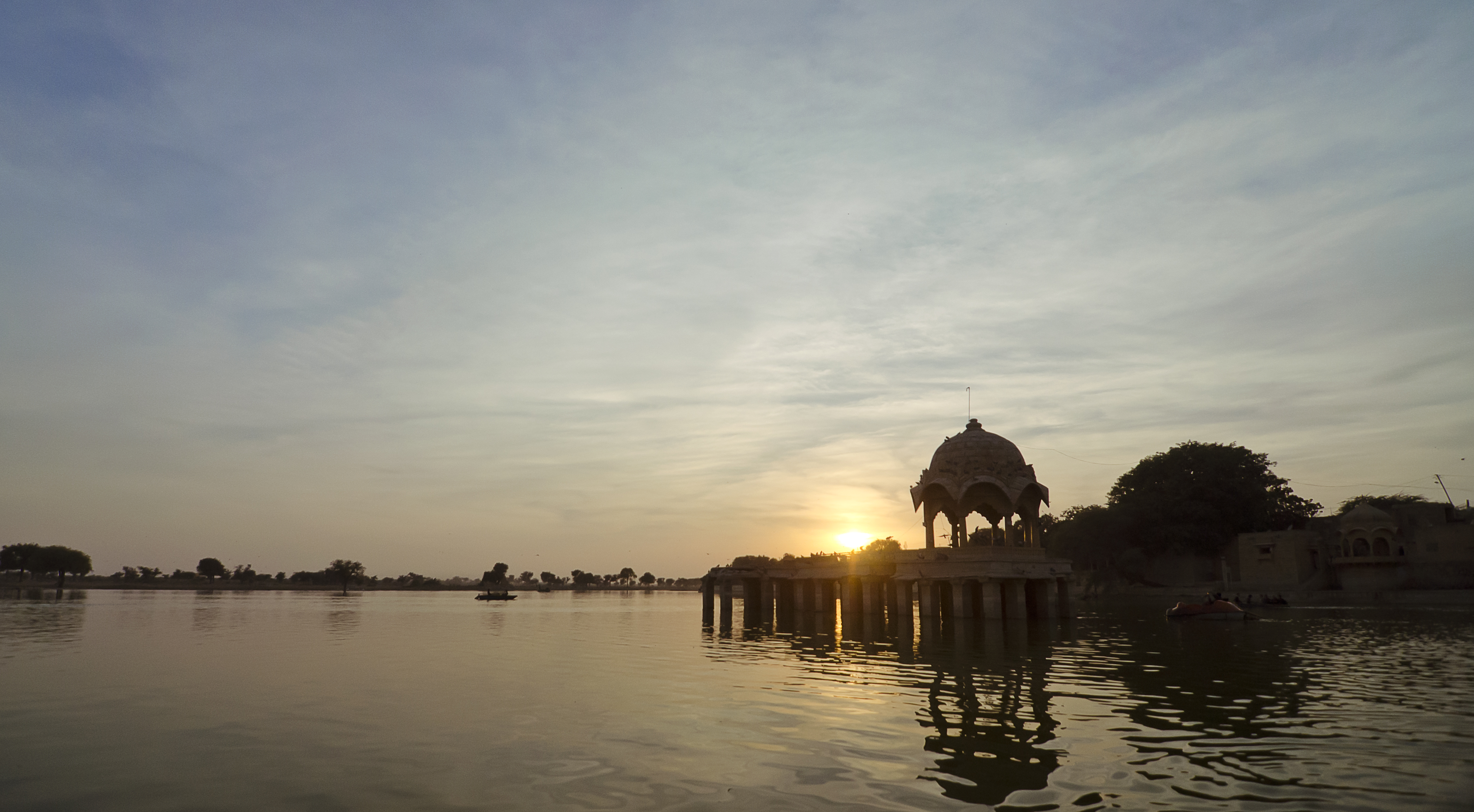
Gadisar Lake

- Gadisar Lake – Excavated in 1367 by Rawal Gadsi Singh, it is a scenic rainwater lake surrounded by the small temples and shrines of Amar Sagar. Earlier, this lake was used to be the main water source of Jaisalmer. Due to an increased water demand for agriculture, the lake is increasingly threatened with drying up.
- Bada Bagh, a complex with chhatris of Jai Singh II (d. 1743) and subsequent Maharajas of Jaisalmer
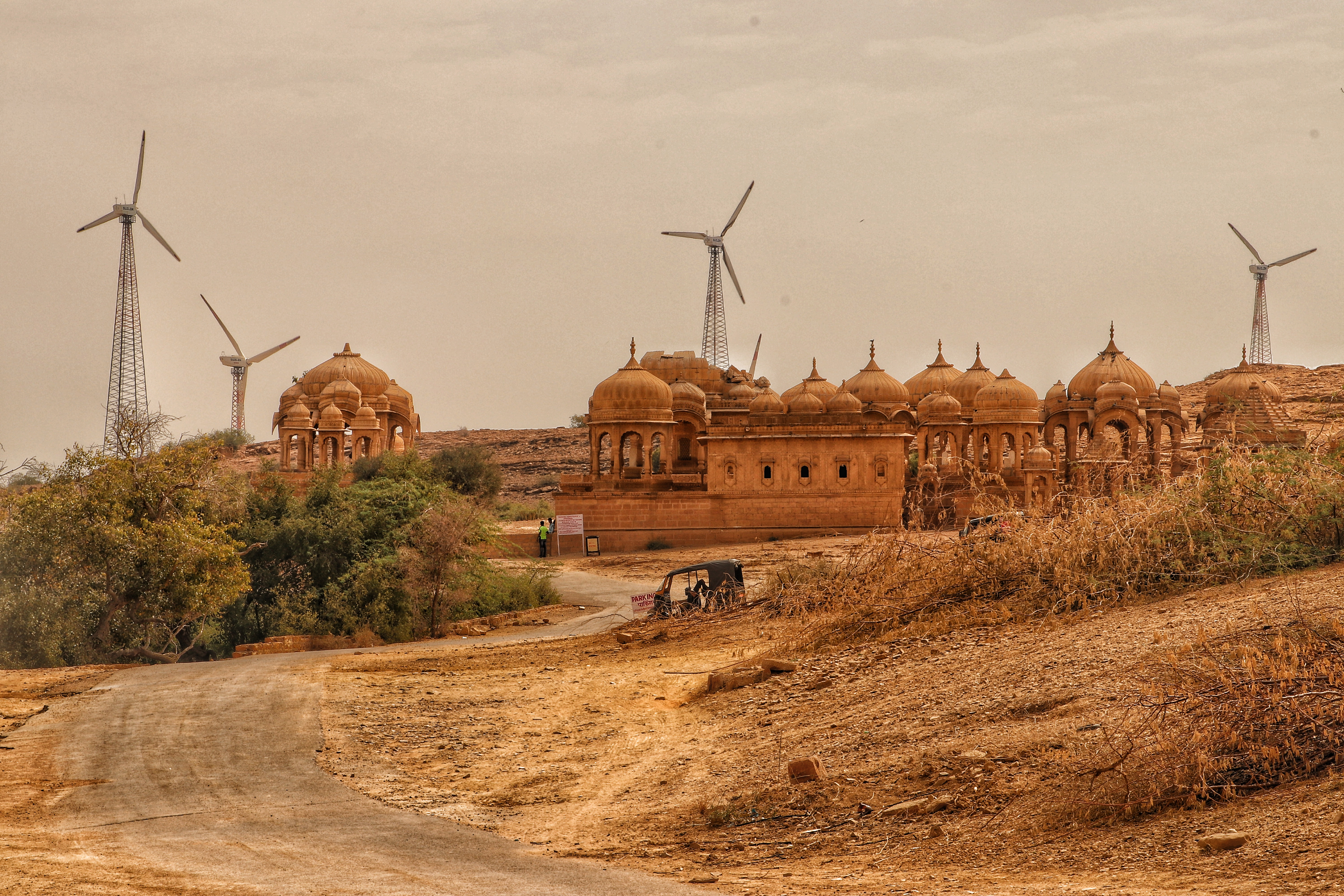
  Bada Bagh, cenotaphs of the royal family

=== In the neighbourhood ===
- Jaisalmer War Museum, a solemn tribute to the nation's military heritage and the sacrifices of its soldiers.
- Kuldhara, a ghost village near Jaisalmer

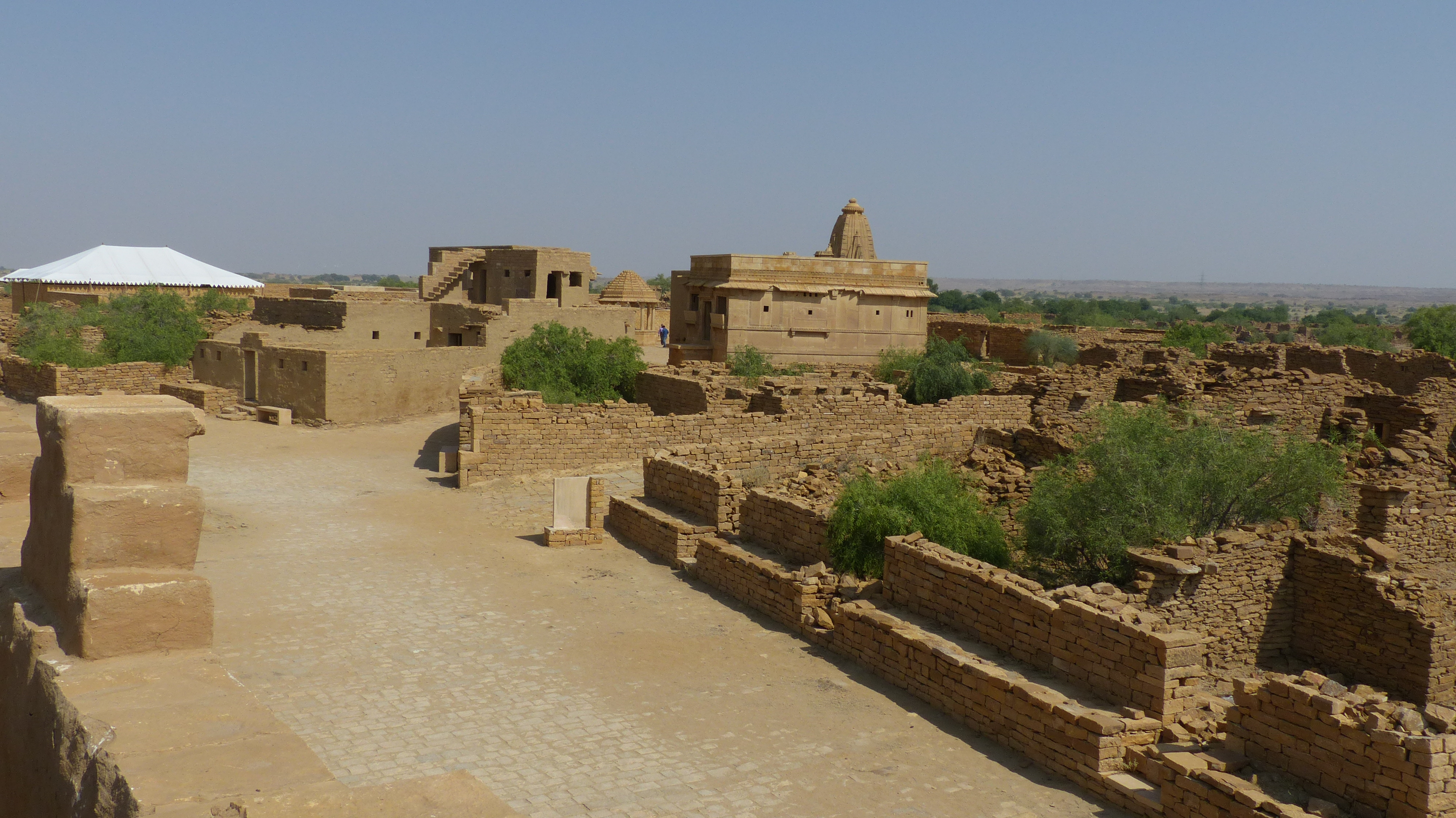
Kuldhara Village

- Tanot Mata, a historical temple near Indo-Pak border.
- Ramdevra, a village in Jaisalmer, is named after Baba Ramdevji, a Tanwar Rajput and a saint who took Samādhi in 1384 CE, at the age of 33 years. He is worshiped today by many social groups of India as Ishta-deva.
- Battle of Longewala point
- Desert National Park
- Lodhruva
- Rajkumari Ratnavati Girls School
- Moolchand Ji Ki Prol is an ancient heritage site in Jhinjhinyali village. Jhinjhinyali is 100 km away from Jaisalmer district headquarters.

=== Museums ===
- Thar Heritage Museum
- Baa RI Haveli On Fort
- Desert Culture Centre & Museum
- Jaisalmer Folklore Museum
- Government Museum
- Jaisalmer Fort Palace Museum
- Akal Fossil Park Museum
- Cactus Park Museum, Kuldhara
- Tanot Museum

=== Desert festival ===
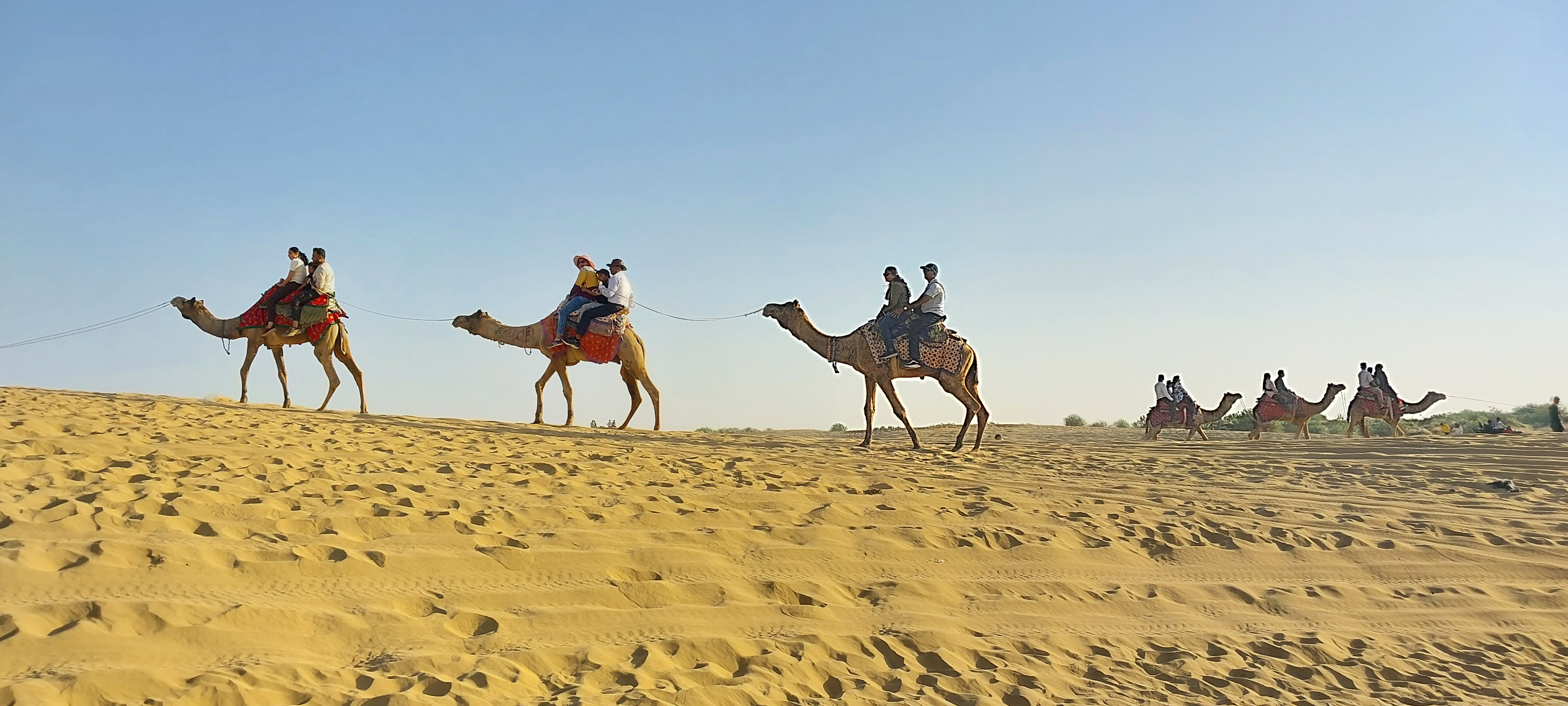
Camel rides in Jaisalmer

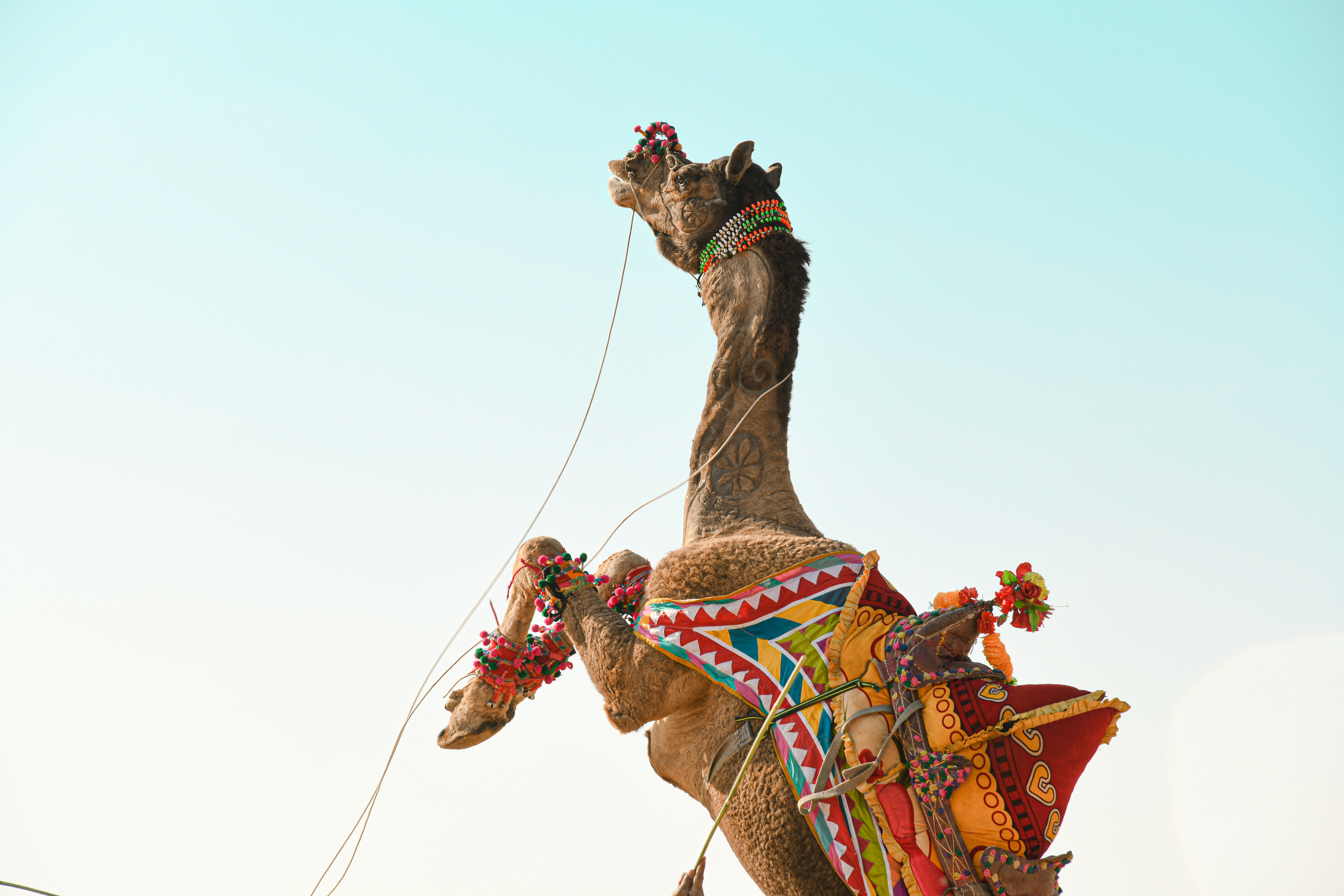
A jumping camel in Desert Festival

The Desert Festival of Jaisalmer features races, turban-tying and Mr. Desert competitions. It is held in the month of February every year. The festival showcases Rajasthani folk songs and dance and is popular with foreign tourists. Gair and fire dancers are the major attraction of the Jaisalmer desert festival celebrations.

== Transport ==
Jaisalmer is connected to the rest of Rajasthan by buses provided by Rajasthan State Transport Corporation as well as other private bus operators.

Jaisalmer Airport is located 17 kilometres southeast of Jaisalmer. Flights serve Mumbai, Delhi, Bangalore, Jaipur, Ahmedabad, Surat and Jodhpur.

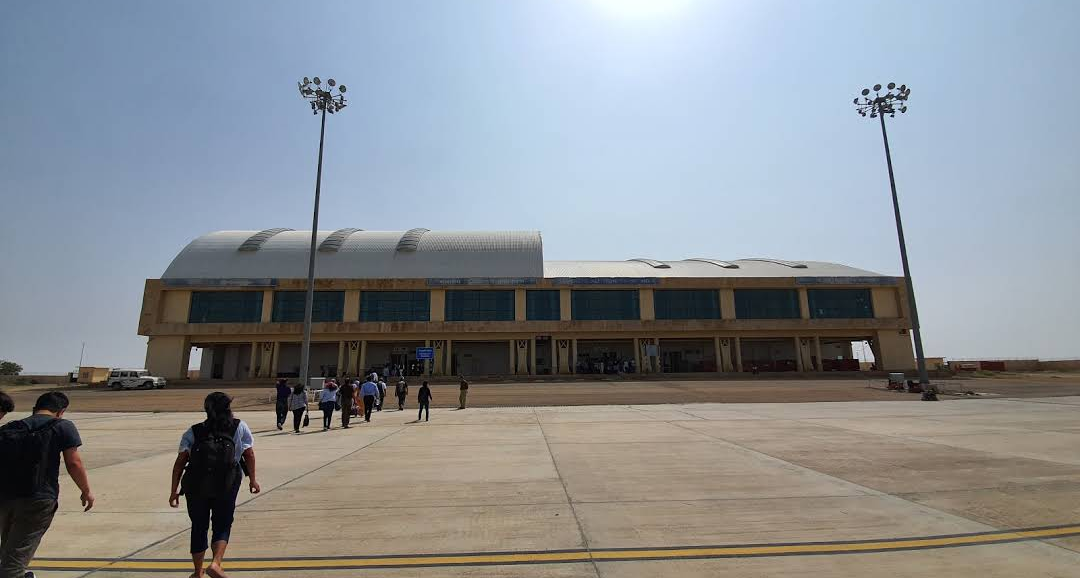
Jaisalmer Airport

Jaisalmer railway station runs daily trains between Jaisalmer and Jaipur, through which it is connected to Delhi and other cities all over India. This station comes under Jodhpur (JU) division of the Northwestern Railway (NWR). Additionally, there exists a luxury tourist train known as Palace on Wheels, which covers the major tourist destinations of Rajasthan, including Jaisalmer.

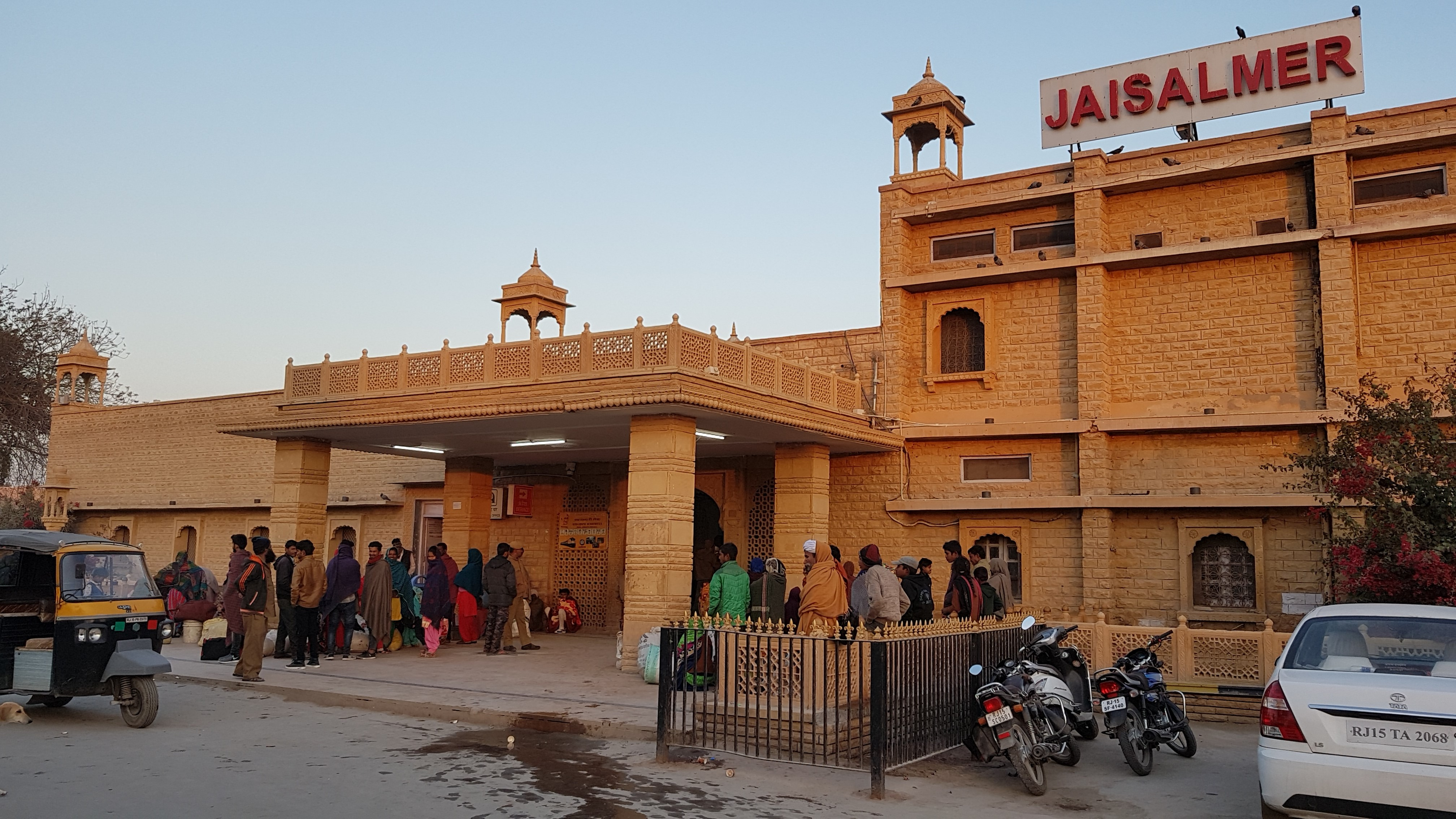
Jaisalmer railway station

== In popular culture ==
- Gupi Gayen Bagha Bayen (1969), a Bengali film directed by Satyajit Ray, was partly shot at Jaisalmer Fort.
- Sonar Kella (1974), Satyajit Ray's Bengali film, based on his eponymous novel featuring his creation, the detective Feluda, was based in Jaisalmer and surrounding areas.
- Hothat Brishti (1998), a Bengali film, was shot in Jaisalmer.
- Nanhe Jaisalmer (2007), Hindi film shot in Jaisalmer
- Goray Gondogol (2012), a Bengali film, was partly shot in Jaisalmer.
- Kishore Kumar Junior (2018), a Bengali film, was partly shot in Jaisalmer.
- The Eken: Ruddhaswas Rajasthan (2023), Bengali movie directed by Joydip Mukherjee and based on Ekenbabu, a detective of Kolkata Police, written by New Jersey–based Bengali author Sujan Dasgupta.

== Notable people ==
- Multanaram Barupal, politician, advocate and former member of Rajasthan Legislative Assembly from Jaisalmer constituency
- Chhotu Singh Bhati, politician and member of Rajasthan Legislative Assembly from Jaisalmer constituency
- Queen Harish, folk dancer
- Mame Khan, Rajasthani folk singer
- Swaroop Khan, playback folk singer
- Raseshwari Rajya Laxmi, queen of Jaisalmer
- Rajyavardhan Singh Rathore, politician, Olympic medallist and retired colonel in the Indian Army
- Rooparam, politician and former member of Rajasthan Legislative Assembly from Jaisalmer constituency
- Gajendra Singh Shekhawat, politician and union cabinet minister in the Minister of Culture and Minister of Tourism

== See also ==
- Indira Gandhi Canal
