= Queen Harish =

Indian folk dancer (1979–2019)

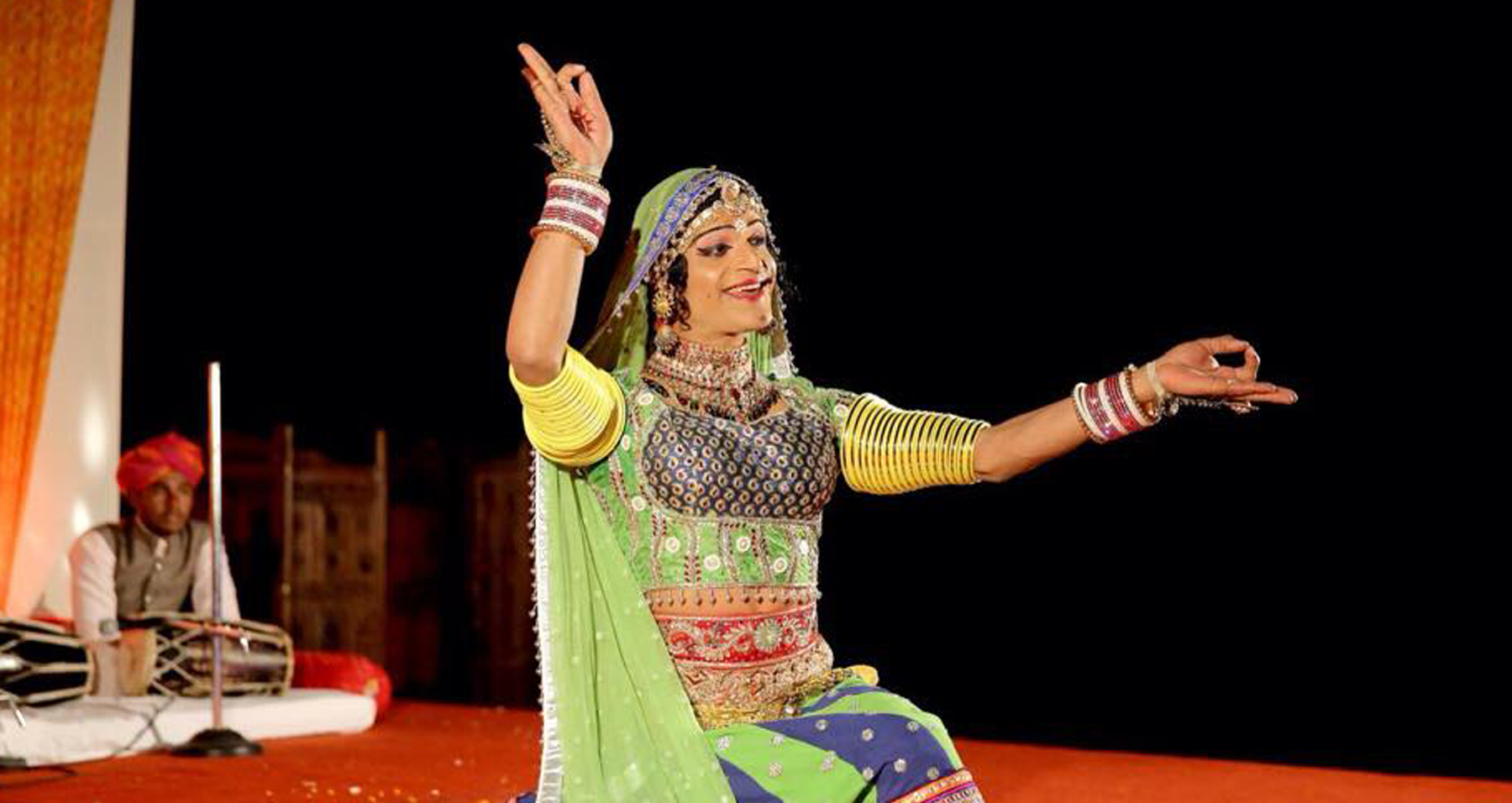
- Queen Harish during a dance performance
- Born: Harish Kumar; 1979; Jaisalmer, Rajasthan, India
- Died: 2 June 2019 (aged 39–40); Jodhpur, Rajasthan
- Occupation: Dancer
- Known for: Rajasthani folk dances
- Children: 2

Harish Kumar (1979 – 2 June 2019) popularly known as Queen Harish was a folk dancer from Rajasthan, India. His work focused on the revival of Rajasthani folk dances, and his performances included various folk dance forms from Rajasthan.

== Biography ==
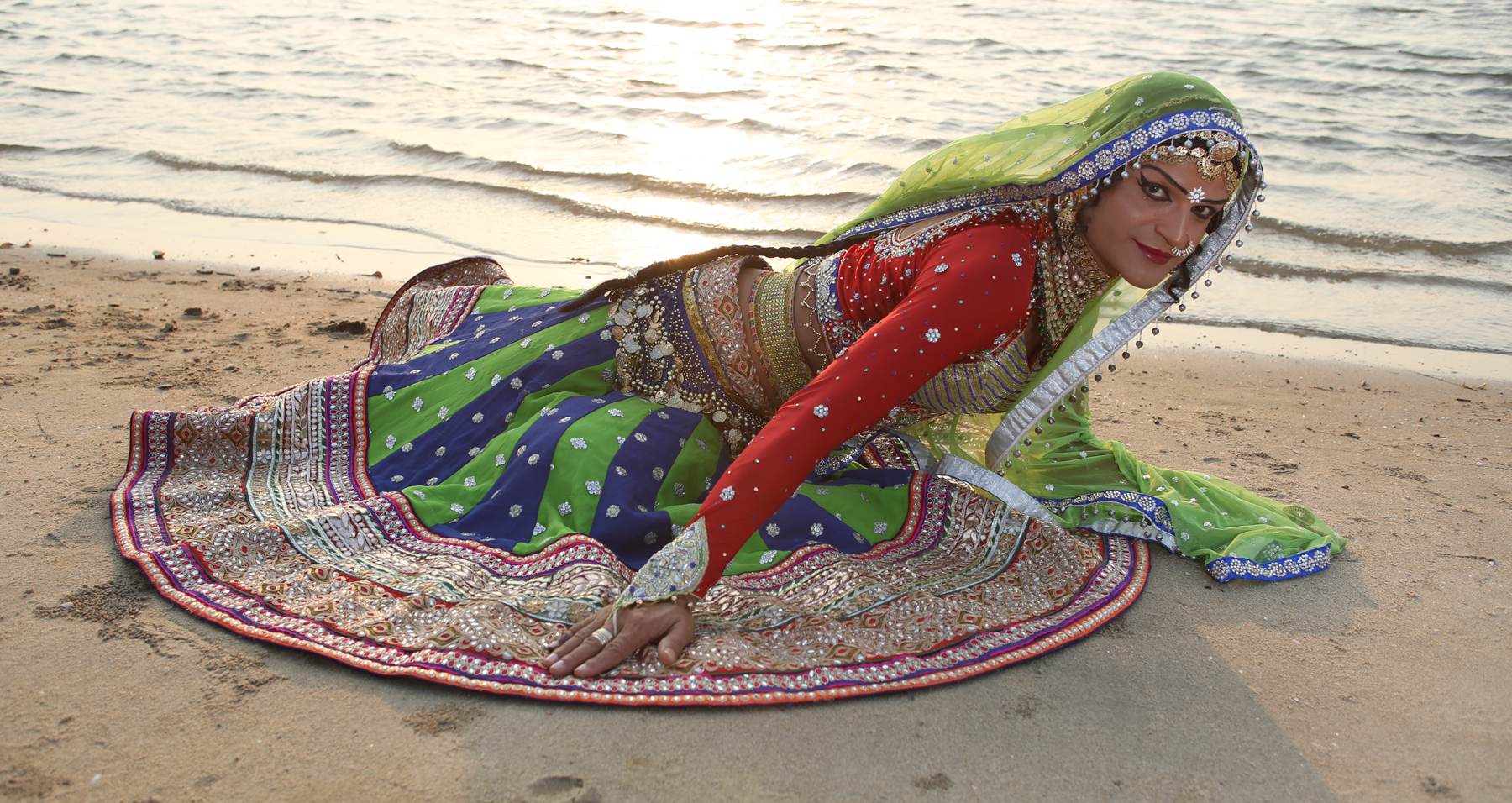
Queen Harish in drag costume

Harish Kumar was born in 1979, in a carpenter family in the Suthar community in Jaisalmer in Rajasthan. He started dancing at the age of 13. Harish, who lost his parents, started drag dancing to take care of his sisters. Inspired by 'Annu Master', the first drag performer in the Jaisalmer region, he started learning drag dance under him. He practiced American tribal style belly dance to make his body more capable of all feminine movements.

Harish had performed Ghoomar, Kalbelia, Chang, Bhavai, Chari, and other folk dances of the Rajasthan state, in nearly 60 countries. His performance was one of the highlights of the annual Jaipur Literary Fest. He has participated in Raqs Congree in Brussels, Belly Dancing Championship in Seoul and Desilicious in New York City. He has appeared in the reality television show 'India's Got Talent' and several Bollywood movies including Appudappudu (2003), Jai Gangaajal (2016) and The Accidental Prime Minister (2019). In 2007, he starred in the documentary When the Road Bends… Tales of a Gypsy Caravan by American filmmaker Jasmine Dellal. In collaboration with the government of Rajasthan, he ran a daily evening show at Jaisalmer called The Queen Harish Show. He was also a choreographer with over two thousand students in Japan alone.

=== Personal life and death ===
Harish was married and had two sons. He died at the age of 39, on 2 June 2019, in a road accident on a highway in Kaparda village near Jodhpur in Rajasthan.

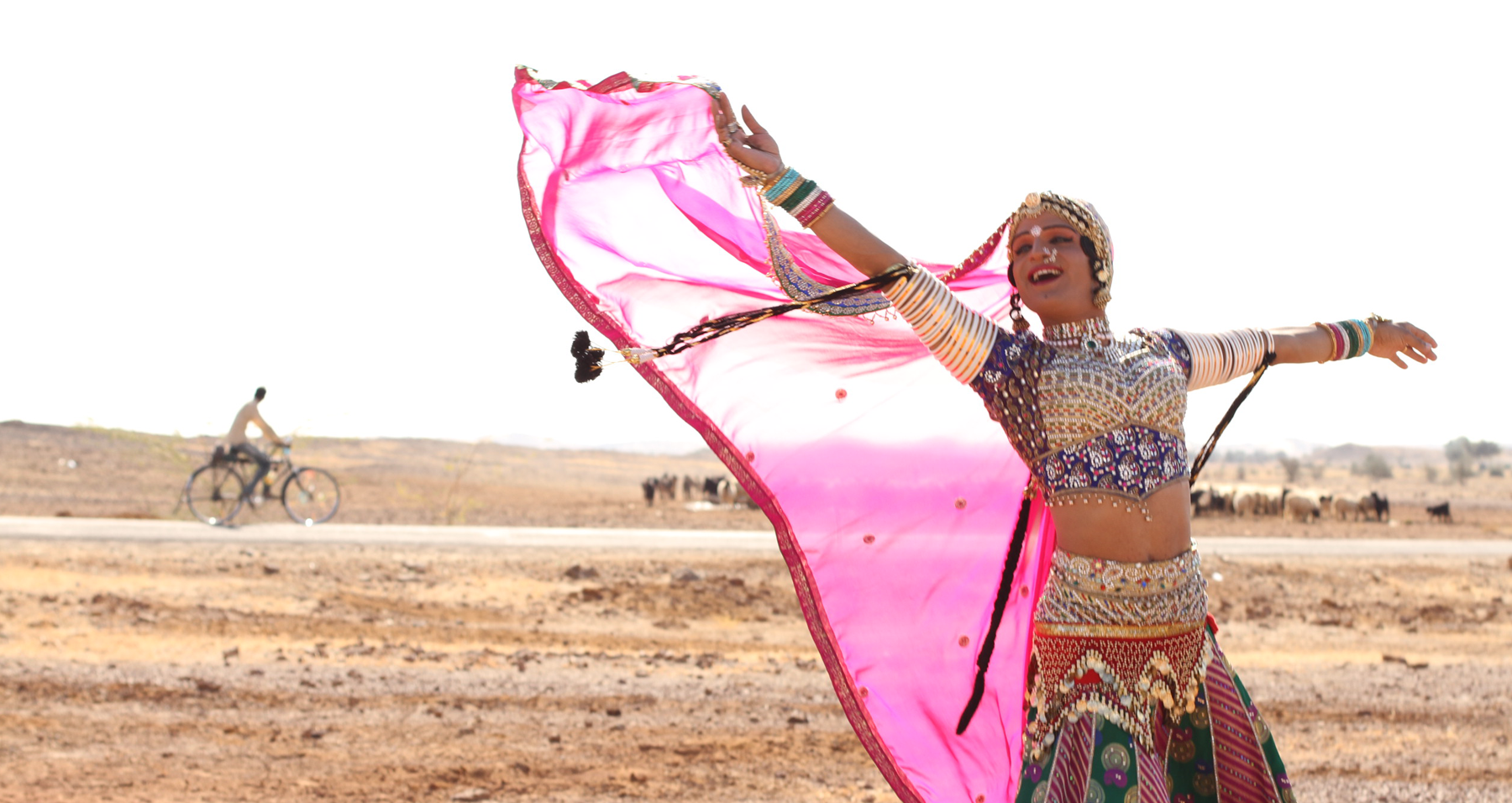
