= Jaisalmer Folklore Museum =

- Location: On the banks of Gadisar Lake, in Mehar Bagh Garden, Jaisalmer, Rajasthan, India
- Type: Natural history museum
- Collection size: Photographs, costumes, fossils, ornaments (horses and camels), jewellery, paintings
- Founder: NK Sharma

The Jaisalmer Folklore Museum is a natural history museum located on the banks of Garsisar Lake, in Mehar Bagh Garden, Jaisalmer, in the Indian state of Rajasthan. The museum was founded by NK Sharma. The museum has different sections such as photographs section, costumes, fossils, ornaments of horses and camels, jewellery, and coterie of paintings. Videos of music instruments and traditional dances can be seen in the museum.

There is an entry charge to visit the museum.
