= Rooparam =

Indian politician

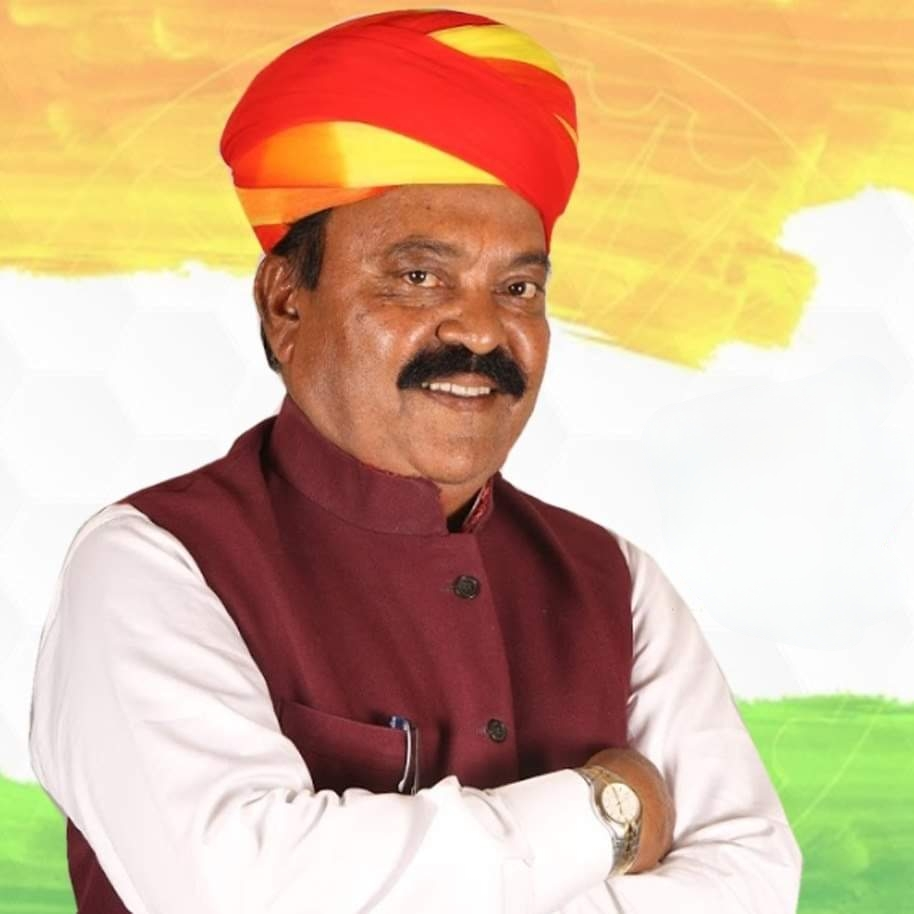
- Rooparam

Member of the Rajasthan Legislative Assembly
- In office 11 December 2018 – 3 December 2023
- Preceded by: Chhotu Singh Bhati
- Succeeded by: Chhotu Singh Bhati
- Constituency: Jaisalmer

Personal details
- Born: Rooparam Dhandev; 1955 or 1956 (age 69–70)
- Party: Indian National Congress
- Spouse: Jatna Devi (m. 1975)
- Children: 7
- Education: Bachelor of Engineering (Civil)
- Occupation: Social service

Rooparam Dhandev is an Indian politician from Rajasthan. He was elected Member of 15th Rajasthan Legislative Assembly from Jaisalmer constituency in Rajasthan. He was ex-Chief Engineer from PHED in Rajasthan. He is an Indian National Congress politician in Rajasthan.

== Personal life ==
Rooparam Dhandev was born to Chaukharam and hails from Chelak in Jaisalmer district. He did B.E. (Civil) from M.B.M Engineering College in the year 1980. On 30 November 1975, he married Jatna Devi. They have six daughters and a son together.

== Political career ==
In the 2013 Rajasthan Legislative Assembly elections, Rooparam contested as an Indian National Congress candidate but was defeated by Bharatiya Janta Party's Chhotu Singh. But he was able to win in the 2018 elections defeating Sansingh Bhati of BJP. He is former MLA from Jaisalmer.In the 2023 Rajasthan Legislative Assembly elections, Rooparam contested as an Indian National Congress candidate but was defeated by Bharatiya Janta Party's Chhotu Singh.

He along with District Collector Namit Mehta, inaugurated the 2019 Desert Festival.
