= Jaisalmer Assembly constituency =

Legislative Assembly constituency in Rajasthan State, India

Coordinates: 26.91°N 70.9°E

Jaisalmer
- Constituency No. 132 for the Rajasthan Legislative Assembly

Constituency details
- Country: India
- Region: North India
- State: Rajasthan
- Division: Jodhpur
- District: Jaisalmer
- Lok Sabha constituency: Barmer
- Established: 1951
- Total electors: 253,418
- Reservation: None

Member of Legislative Assembly
- 16th Rajasthan Legislative Assembly
- Incumbent Chhotu Singh Bhati
- Party: Bharatiya Janata Party
- Elected year: 2023
- Preceded by: Rooparam Dhandev

Jaisalmer Assembly constituency is one of the 200 Legislative Assembly constituencies of Rajasthan state in India. It is part of Jaisalmer district.

== Members of the Legislative Assembly ==
Year	Member	Party
1952	Hadvant Singh	Independent
1957	Hukam Singh	Independent
1962	Hukam Singh	Indian National Congress
1967	B. Singh	Swatantra Party
1972	Bhopal Singh	Indian National Congress
1977	Kishan Singh Bhati	Janata Party
1980	Chadravir Singh	Bharatiya Janata Party
1985	Multana Ram	Independent
1990	Jitendra Singh	Janata Dal
1993	Gulab Singh	Bharatiya Janata Party
1998	Gordhan Das	Indian National Congress
2003	Sang Singh Bhati	Bharatiya Janata Party
2008	Chhotu Singh Bhati	Bharatiya Janata Party
2013	Chhotu Singh Bhati	Bharatiya Janata Party
2018	Rooparam Dhandev	Indian National Congress
2023	Chhotu Singh Bhati	Bharatiya Janata Party

== Election results ==
=== 2023 ===
2023 Rajasthan Legislative Assembly election: Jaisalmer
Party	Candidate	Votes	%	±%
BJP	Chhotu Singh Bhati	104,636	52.62	▲11.73
INC	Rooparam Dhandev	85,949	43.23	▼13.53
RLP	Raghuveer Singh	2,262	1.14	
NOTA	None of the above	1,602	0.81	▲0.02
Majority		18,687	9.39	▼6.48
Turnout		198,839	78.46	▼4.49
BJP gain from INC		Swing		

=== 2018 ===
Rajasthan Legislative Assembly Election, 2018: Jaisalmer
Party	Candidate	Votes	%	±%
INC	Rooparam Dhandev	106,531	56.76	
BJP	Sang Singh Bhati	76,753	40.89	
NOTA	None of the above	1,484	0.79	
Majority		29,778	15.87	
Turnout		187,702	82.95	
INC gain from BJP		Swing		

== See also ==
- List of constituencies of the Rajasthan Legislative Assembly
- Jaisalmer district
