= Multanaram Barupal =

Indian politician

Multana Ram Barupal
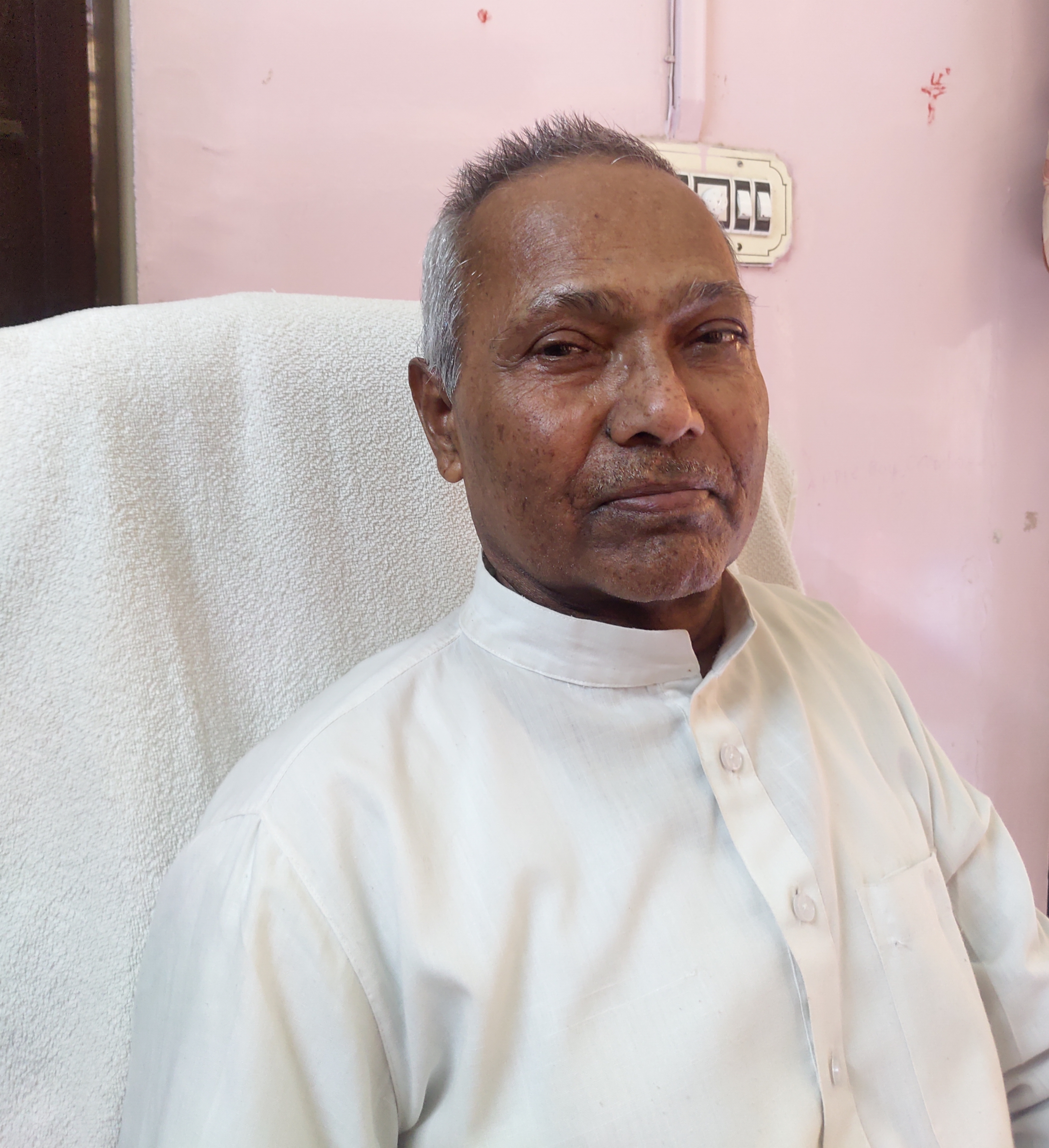

Member of the Rajasthan Legislative Assembly
- In office 1985-1990
- Constituency: Jaisalmer

Personal details
- Born: Seuwa, Jaisalmer
- Occupation: Lawyer, Politician, Writer

Multana Ram Barupal is an Indian advocate, politician and former MLA of Jaisalmer in Rajasthan.

He has been the chairman of Bar Association of Jaisalmer.
