= Chhotu Singh Bhati =

Indian politician (born 1955)

Member of the 16th Rajasthan Legislative Assembly
- Incumbent
- Assumed office 3 December 2023
- Preceded by: Rooparam
- Constituency: Jaisalmer
- In office 2008–2018
- Preceded by: Sang Singh
- Succeeded by: Rooparam
- Constituency: Jaisalmer

Personal details
- Born: 19 January 1955 (age 71) Poonam Nagar, Jaisalmer district, Rajasthan, India
- Party: Bharatiya Janata Party
- Spouse: Geeta Kunwar (m. 1985)
- Children: 2
- Occupation: Agriculturalist

Chotu Singh Bhati (born 19 January 1955) is an Indian politician and a member of 16th Rajasthan Legislative Assembly representing the Jaisalmer constituency of Rajasthan. He is a member of the Bharatiya Janata Party. He was also a member of the 13th and the 14th Rajasthan Legislative Assembly.

== Personal life ==
Bhati was born on 19 January 1955 to Karan Singh Bhati and Chand Kunwar in the Poonam Nagar village of Jaisalmer district. He completed intermediate education from S.S School, Rajasthan in Ajmer in the year 1973–74. Singh married Geeta Kunwar on 13 March 1985, with whom he has two sons. Singh is an agriculturalist by profession.

== Political career ==
Bhati won from the Jaisalmer constituency in the 2008 Rajasthan Legislative Assembly election, representing the Bharatiya Janata Party, and repeated it again in 2013, becoming a member of the 13th and the 14th Rajasthan Legislative Assembly respectively.

In the 2023 Rajasthan Legislative Assembly election, Bhati again representing Bharatiya Janata Party, went on to defeat rival and incumbent Rooparam of Indian National Congress by a margin of 18,687 votes, regaining the Jaisalmer constituency seat in the process.
