= Nakoda =

Nakoda may refer to:

- Nakoda people, an Indigenous people in the US and Canada
- Nakoda, Rajasthan, a village in India
- Nakoda, Maharashtra, a town in India
- Nakodaji, a Jain temple

== See also ==
- Nakhuda, Persian title for a shipmaster
- Nakhuda (film), a 1981 Indian film
