= Nakodaji =

Śvetāmbara Jain temple in Rajasthan, India

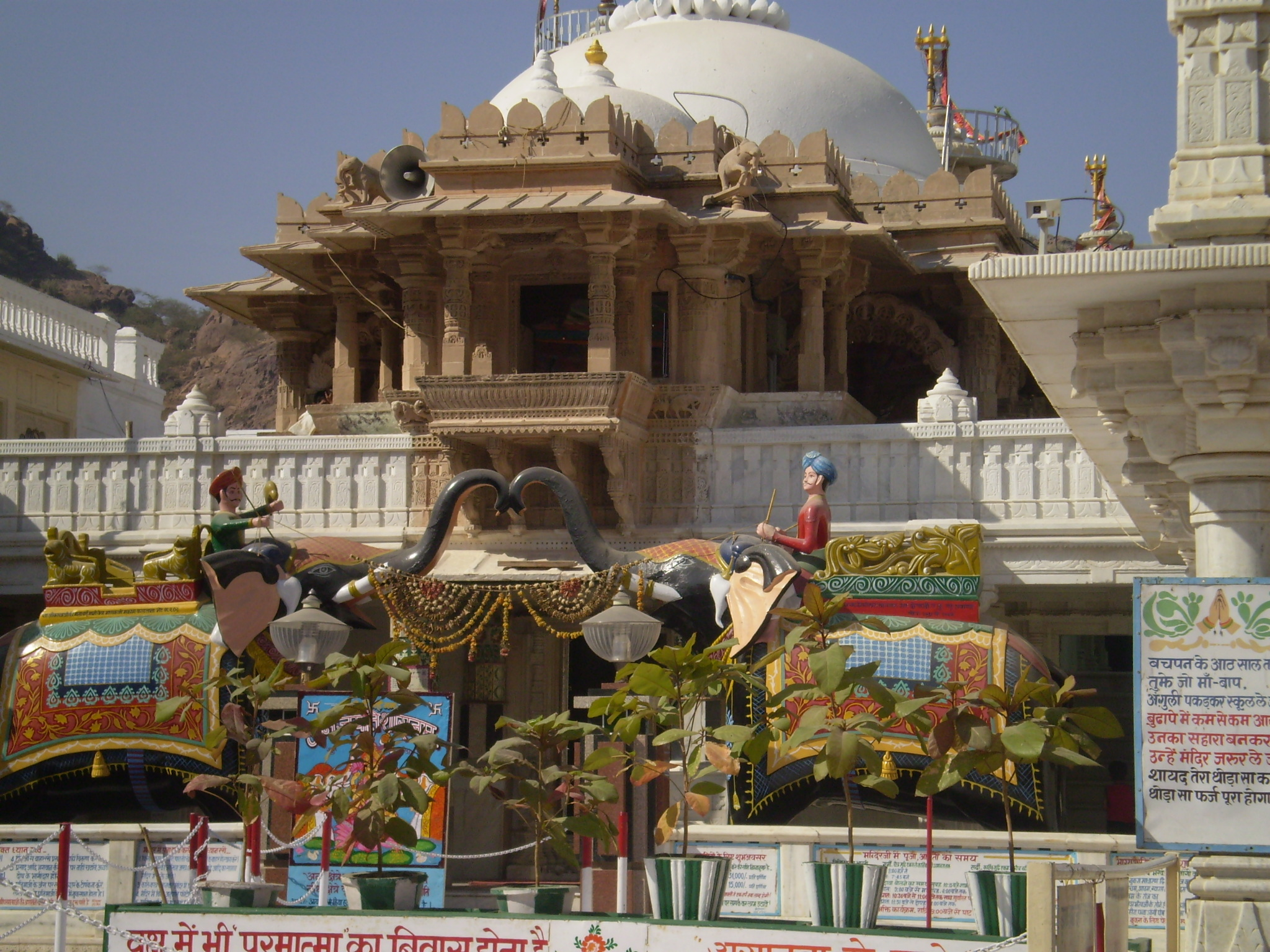
- Shree Jain Shwetambar Nakoda Parshwanath Tirth

Religion
- Affiliation: Jainism
- Sect: Śvetāmbara
- Deity: Parshvanatha
- Festivals: Posh Dashmi and Mahavir Janam Kalyanak
- Governing body: Shri Jain Shwetambar Nakoda Parshwanath Tirth Trust

Location
- Location: Mewa Nagar, Balotra, Rajasthan
- Interactive map of Nakodaji
- Coordinates: 25°47′17″N 72°09′09″E

Architecture
- Creator: Sthulabhadra
- Established: 3rd century
- Temple: 17

Website
- www.nakodatirth.org

Nakodaji Tirth is a major Śvetāmbara Jain tirth (pilgrimage site) of Tirthankara Parshwanatha in the Indian state of Rajasthan, located between the villages of Vikrampura and Nakoda in Barmer District. The temple houses the icon of Nakoda Bhairava, a prominent Śvetāmbara guardian deity.

== Main temple ==
The temple is an important pilgrimage center visited by both Jains and Hindus. Devotees visit the shrine, especially after marriage. The temple is currently administered by Tapa Gaccha (monastic order) of Murtipujaka Śvetāmbara.

=== History ===
According to Jain legend, the Nakodaji temple was initially built by Jain acharya Sthulabhadra (3rd century BCE). However, the current structure was constructed in 11th century CE by Solanki Dynasty . The temple has 246 inscriptions indicating multiple renovations and additions over the centuries. The temple was invaded by Alam Shah. However, the central icon of Parshavanatha, along with 120 idols, was safely hidden in a nearby village. In 1449 CE, the central image, along with an icon of Bhairava, was later re-installed in the temple by Acharya Kirtisuri. The renovation of the temple was commissioned by Kalija. An image of Acharya Kirtisuri was installed opposite the Bhairava image by Hetha Shah.

The first international seminar on the "yogic tradition of India with special reference to Jain yoga" was held at the India International Centre, and sponsored by Nakodaji Tirth and B. L. Institute of Indology.

=== Architecture ===
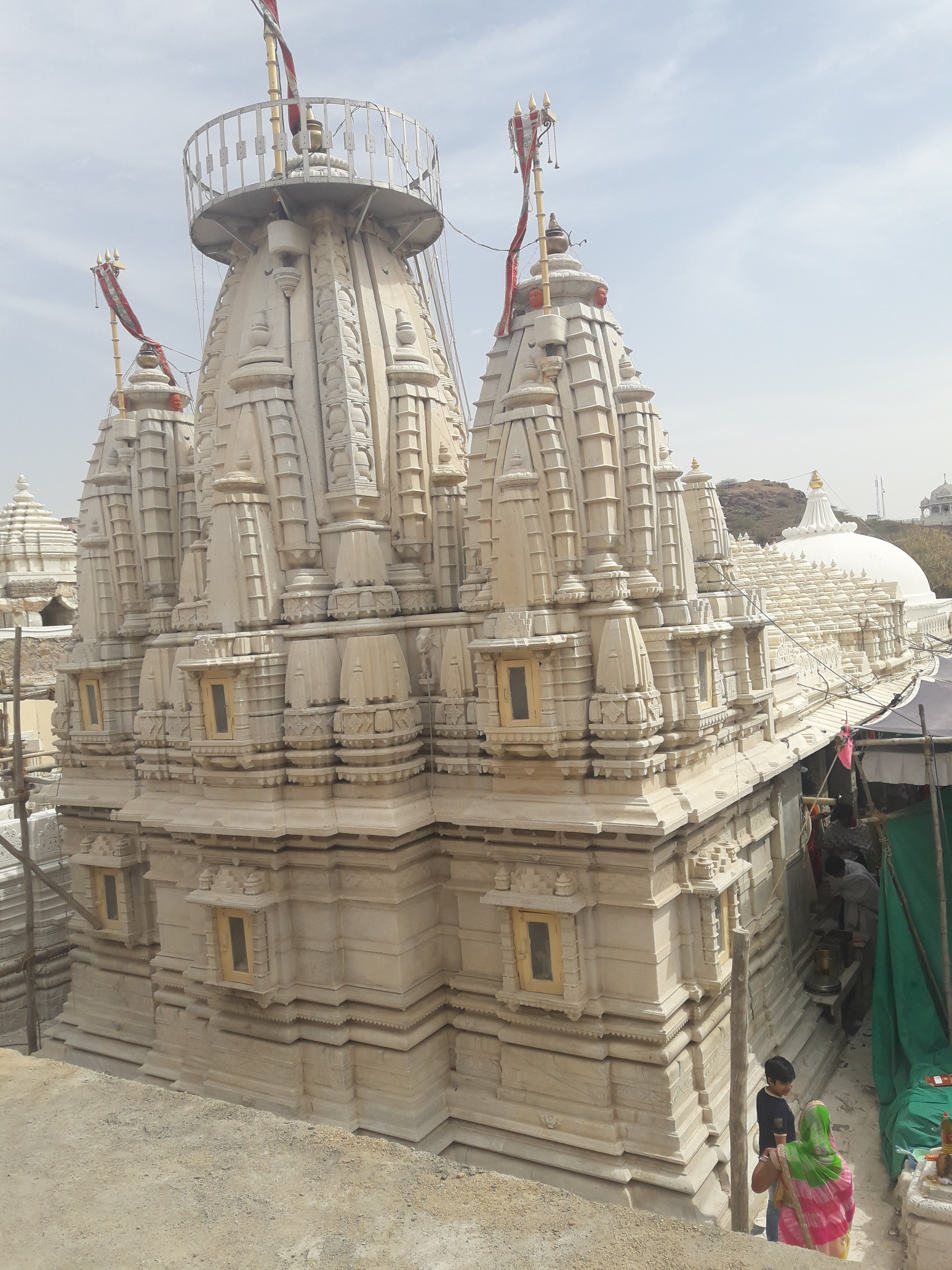
Shikhara

The temple is famous for its architecture. It is a large structure with a highly decorated façade. The principal shrine is a large domical structure, with 52 domical sub-shrines along its axis. The temple is constructed using makrana marble and Jaisalmer's sandstone. The elaborate shikhara of the temple is regarded as a rare example of architectural and sculptural elegance. The temple has two life-sized elephant sculptures with riders on either side of its entrance. The temple also has bhonyra (underground chamber) housing 35 idols.

A goshala (protective shelter for stray cows) is managed by the temple. The temple also has a dharamshala equipped with modern facilities, including a bhojanalaya (community kitchen and dining room).

=== Deities ===
The central icon, popularly known as Nakoda Parshvanath, is a 24 in (610 mm) black stone idol of Parshvanatha. According to Jain legend, the image was discovered in Nakoda village when a Jain layman had a dream about its presence. However, the icon was not found at the indicated place—the exact location was pointed out by Bhairava in the following dream. Nakoda Parshvanath is one of the 108 Parshvanatha icons (Note: In Shvetambara tradition, there are 108 prominent icons of Parshvanath; each derives its name from a geographical region.) and is considered one of the most devotionally revered of Parshvanatha. The icons and the images of the deity are installed in the temple and household shrines. According to Jain belief, worshipping replications of the idol is equivalent to worshipping the original icon. A fair is organised here on the birth anniversary of Parshvanatha that draws numerous devotees.

The temple is noted for the worship of the tutelary deity Nakoda Bhairava, who is popular among devotees. The Bhairava icon is red in colour, four-armed and has a moustache with a dog as the vahana. He carries in the lower hands a kapala and a damaru and khadga and Trishula in his upper hands. Nakoda Bhairava is an important guardian deity in the Śvetāmbara sect. Nakoda Bhairava is believed to grant the wishes of devotees that make offering there; performing puja (praying) brings prosperity. Devotees consider the deity a business partner and offer a share of their profits to him. Nakoda Bhairava is also linked to tantra and is believed to free people from spirit possession. The food offering (prasada) is an uncommon practice in Jainism. However, at Nakodaji, prasada is offered to Nakoda Bhairava. (Note: Prasada is only offered to deities such as Nakoda, and not Tirthankaras. This is because, unlike Tirthankaras, those deities are not liberated.) The prasada is required to be consumed inside the temple and should not be taken outside.

There is another sub-shrine near the main shrine housing an idol of Kal Bhairava, Nakoda Bhairava's brother.

== Other temples ==
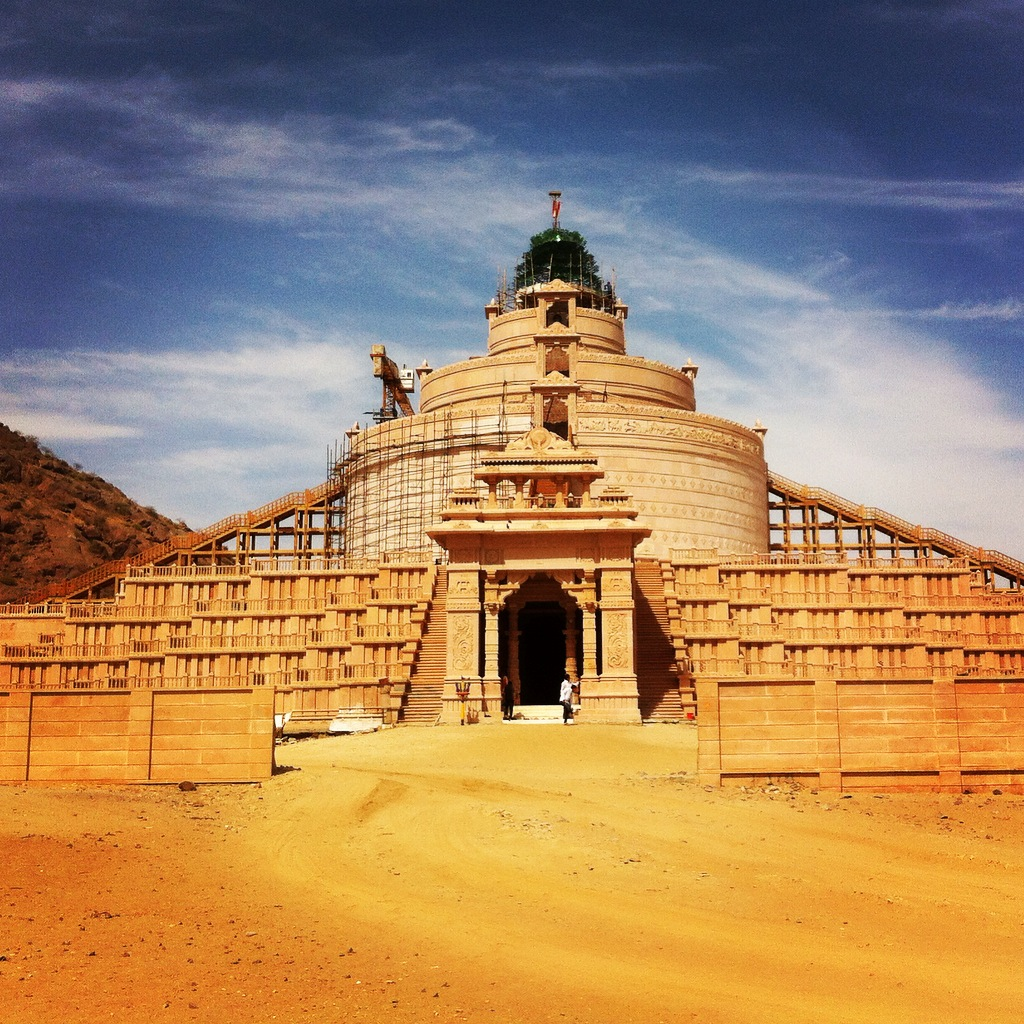
Samosaran temple

Besides the main temple, there are two more: Lachi Bai temple (Rishabhdev temple), and Shantinath temple as well as one dādābadī in the village.

Lachi Bai temple was constructed in 1511 CE by Chhalibai, sister of Acharya Jinchandra Suri. The temple is dedicated to Rishabhanatha.

Shantinath Jain temple, constructed in the 19th century, is a large structure with a highly decorated façade. The temple features three Nagara style shikhara adorned by amalaka. The temple facade wall has carvings of Laskhmi and Saraswati within separate niches.

Dādābadī, built outside the main shrine, is a shrine dedicated to the four Dādā Gurus revered by the Kharatara Gaccha. The shrine also houses an idol of Kal Bhairava.

Samosaran temple, built near the main temple, is a depiction of Samavasarana (divine preaching hall of the Tirthankara).

== Gallery ==
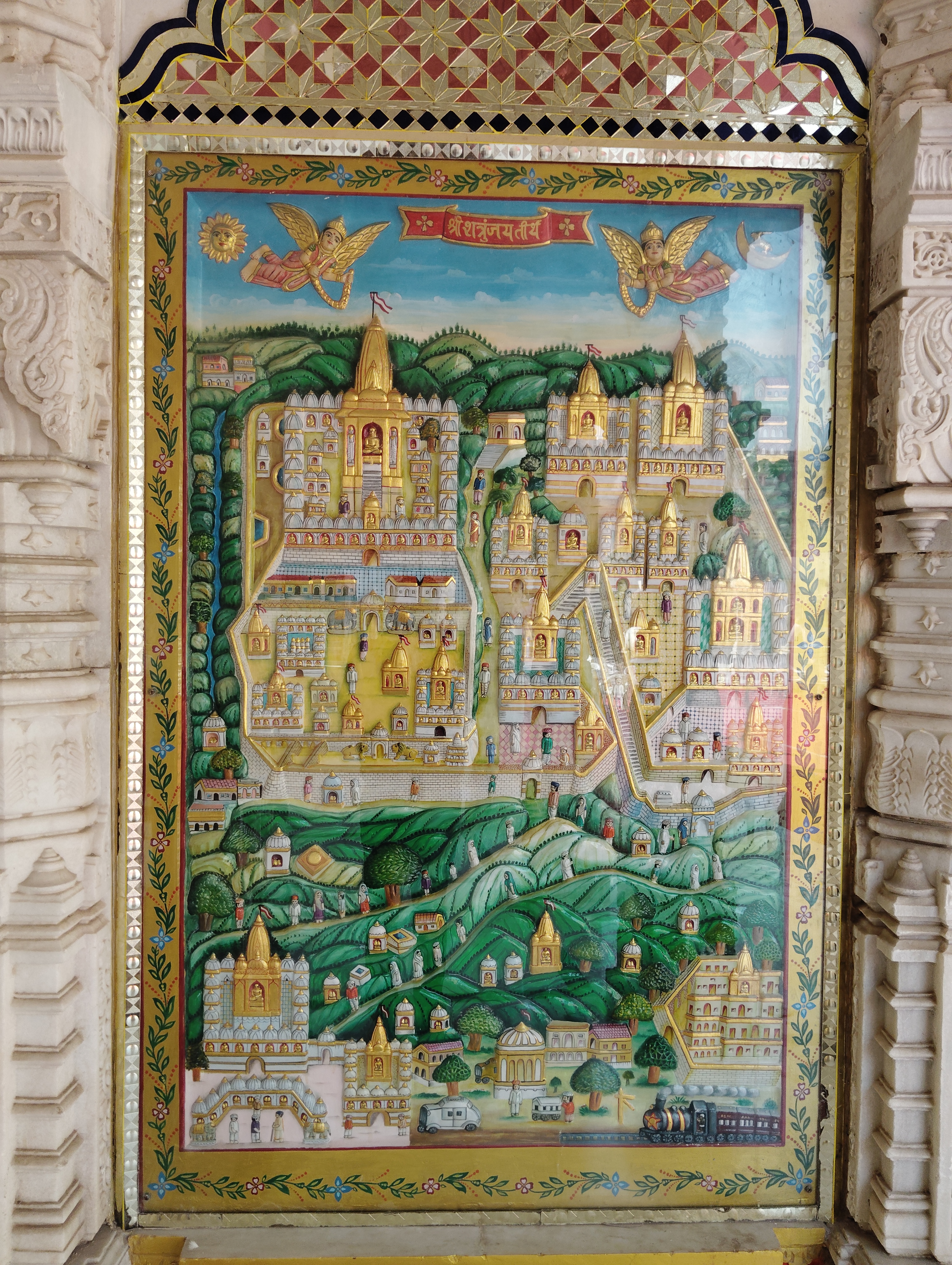
Mural

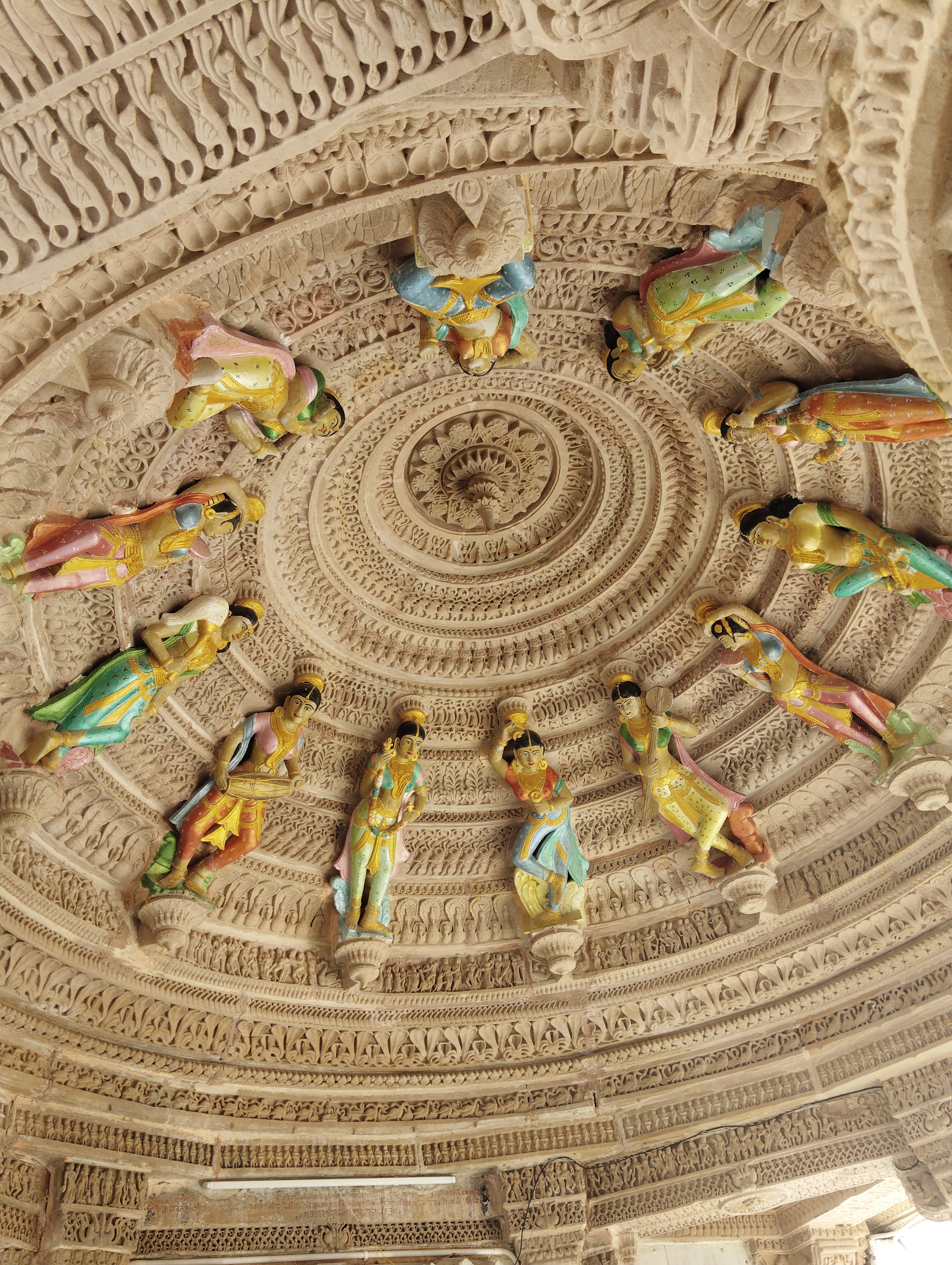
Ceiling

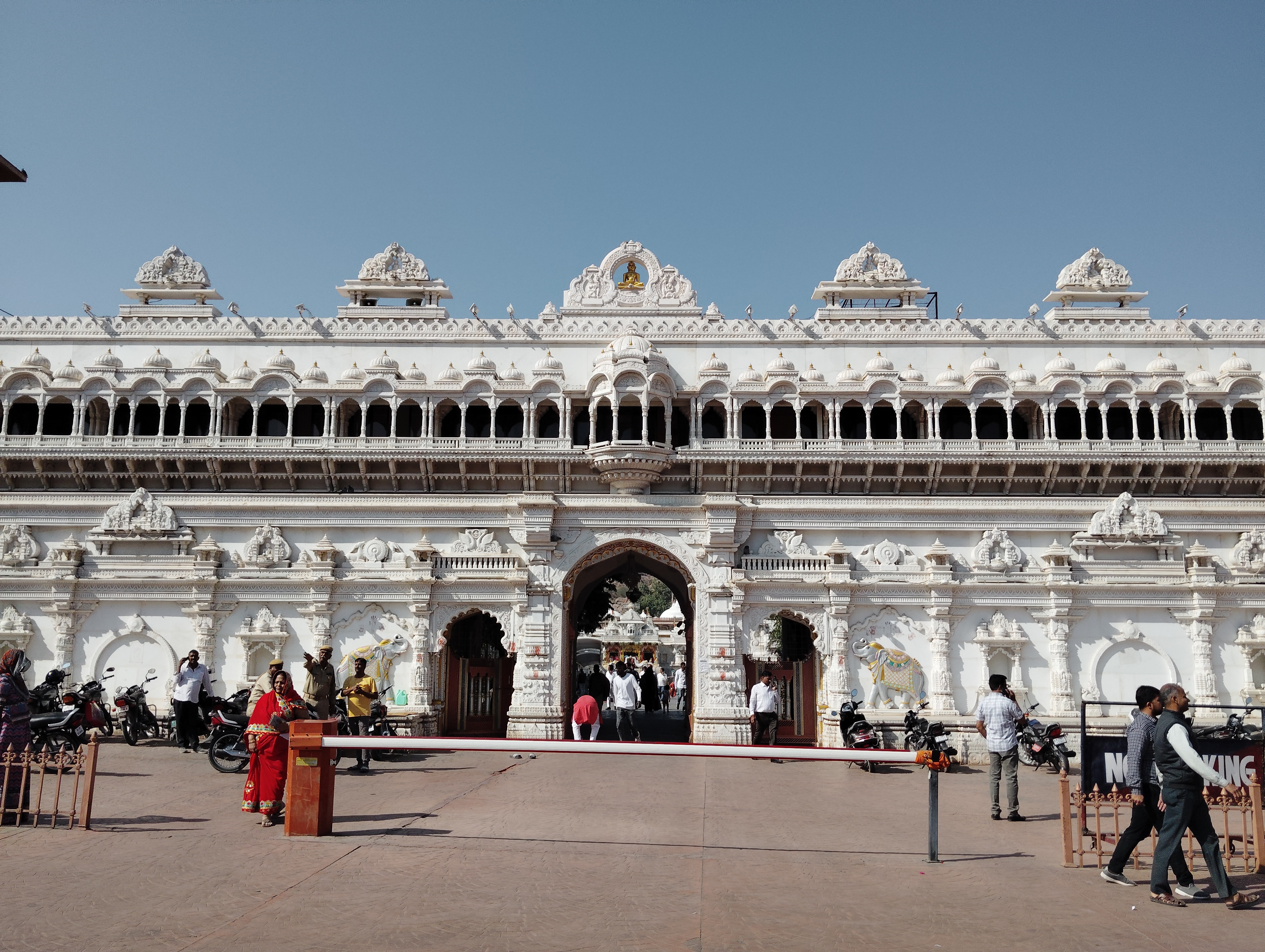
Outer wall

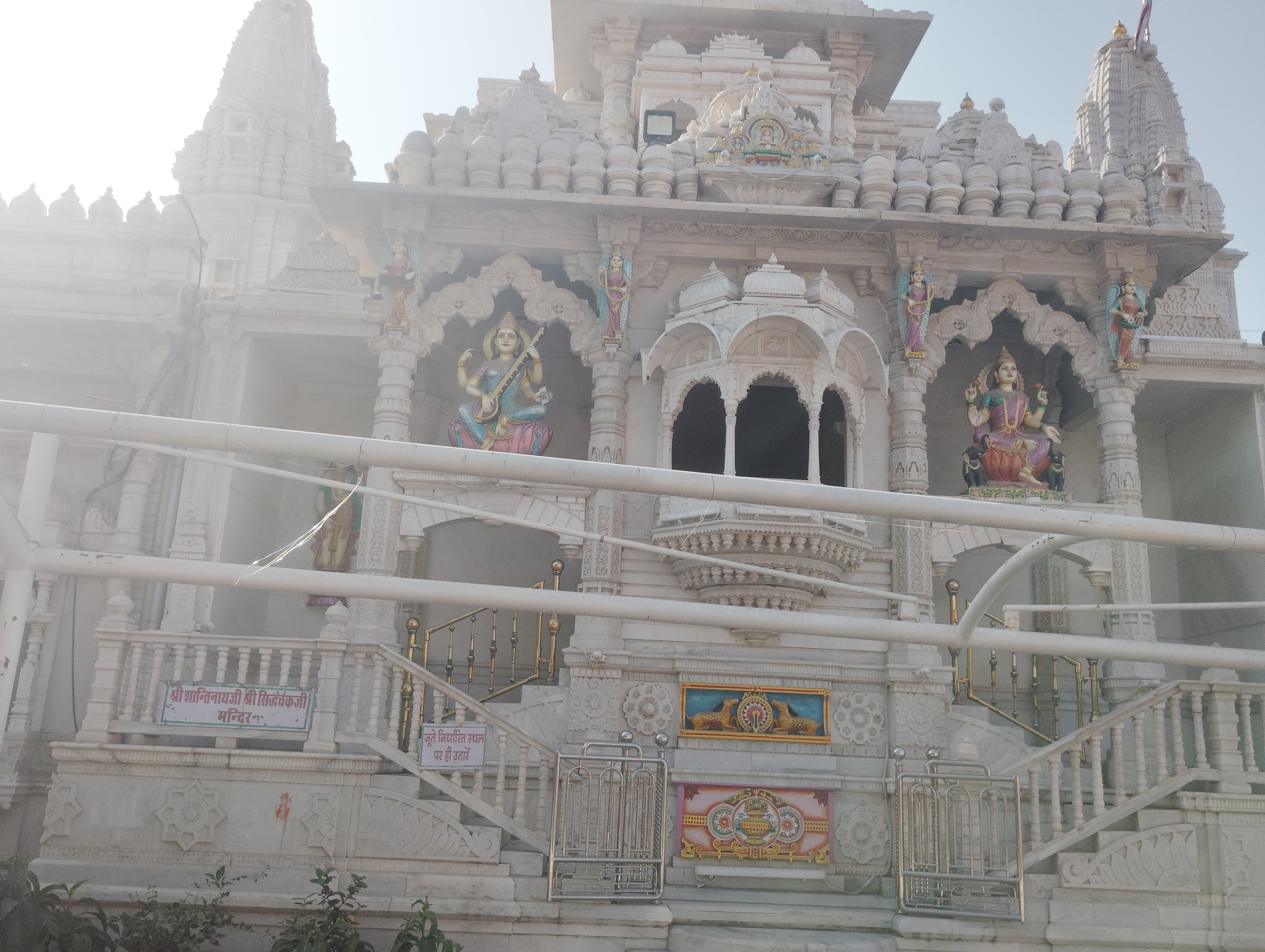
Shantinanth temple

== See also ==
- Kesariyaji
- Ranakpur Jain temple
- Dilwara temples

== Bibliography ==
=== Book ===
- Babb, Lawrence A. (1996), Absent Lord: Ascetics and Kings in a Jain Ritual Culture, University of California Press, ISBN 978-0-520-91708-8
- Babb, Lawrence A. (29 April 2013). Emerald City: The Birth and Evolution of an Indian Gemstone Industry. SUNY Press. ISBN 9781438445885.
- Carrithers, Michael; Humphrey, Caroline (4 April 1991). The Assembly of Listeners: Jains in Society. Cambridge University Press. ISBN 9780521365055.
- Chapple, Christopher Key (14 October 2015). Yoga in Jainism. Routledge. ISBN 9781317572183.
- Cort, John E. (2001), Jains in the World: Religious Values and Ideology in India, Oxford University Press, ISBN 978-0-19-803037-9
- Cort, John E. (2010), Framing the Jina: Narratives of Icons and Idols in Jain History, Oxford University Press, ISBN 978-0-19-538502-1
- Hiltebeitel, Alf (1989), Criminal Gods and Demon Devotees: Essays on the Guardians of Popular Hinduism, SUNY Press, ISBN 978-0-88706-982-6
- Kent, Eliza F.; Kassam, Tazim R. (12 July 2013). Lines in Water: Religious Boundaries in South Asia. Book collections on Project MUSE. Syracuse University Press. ISBN 9780815652250.
- Lodha, Jain Chanchalmal (2013). History of Oswals. Panchshil Publications. ISBN 9788192373027.
- Mehta, Jodh Sinha (1970). Abu to Udapiur. Motilal Banarsidass. ISBN 9788120829848.
- Panikar, Agustin (2010). Jainism: History, Society, Philosophy and Practice. Lala Sunder Lal Jain research series. Vol. 24. Delhi: Motilal Banarsidass. ISBN 978-81-208-3460-6.
- Reddy, Pedarapu Chenna (2022). Nagabharana: Recent Trends in Jainism Studies. Blue Rose Publishers. ISBN 978-93-56114-46-3.
- Weisgrau, Maxine; Henderson, Carol (23 March 2016). Raj rhapsodies: tourism, heritage and the seduction of history. New Directions in Tourism Analysis. Routledge. ISBN 978-1-3170-7161-7.
- White, David Gordon (2018). Princeton University Press. Princeton Readings in Religions. Vol. 7. Princeton University Press. ISBN 978-0-691-05779-8.
- Wiley, Kristi L. (2009). The A to Z of Jainism. Vol. 38. Scarecrow Press. ISBN 978-0-8108-6337-8.

=== Web ===
- Aukland, Knut (1 January 2013). "Understanding Possession in Jainism: A Study of Oracular Possession in Nakoda". Cambridge University Press. Modern Asian Studies. 47 (1): 109–134. doi:10.1017/S0026749X1200039X. JSTOR 23359781. S2CID 145722331.
- Aukland, Knut (2010). "The Cult of Nākoḍā Bhairava" (PDF). University of Oslo.
- Hegewald, Julia A. B. (2015). "THE INTERNATIONAL JAINA STYLE? Māru-Gurjara Temples Under the Solaṅkīs, throughout India and in the Diaspora". Ars Orientalis. 45: 114–140. doi:10.3998/ars.13441566.0045.005. JSTOR 26350210.
- RTDC. "Barmer". Rajasthan Tourism Development Corporation.
- Indira Gandhi National Centre for the Arts
  - IGNCA. "Nakora Ji Ka Mandir" (PDF). Indira Gandhi National Centre for the Arts.
  - IGNCA. "Shantinath Jain Mandir" (PDF). Indira Gandhi National Centre for the Arts.
- Government of Rajasthan
  - "Mandir Jain Tirth Shri Nakoda Ji". Department of Devasthan, Government of Rajasthan.
  - Directorate Gopalan Rajasthan. "Gaushala Details in Nodal Office". Directorate Gopalan Rajasthan, Government of Rajasthan.
