= Hindi Belt =

Linguistic region of India

- Region
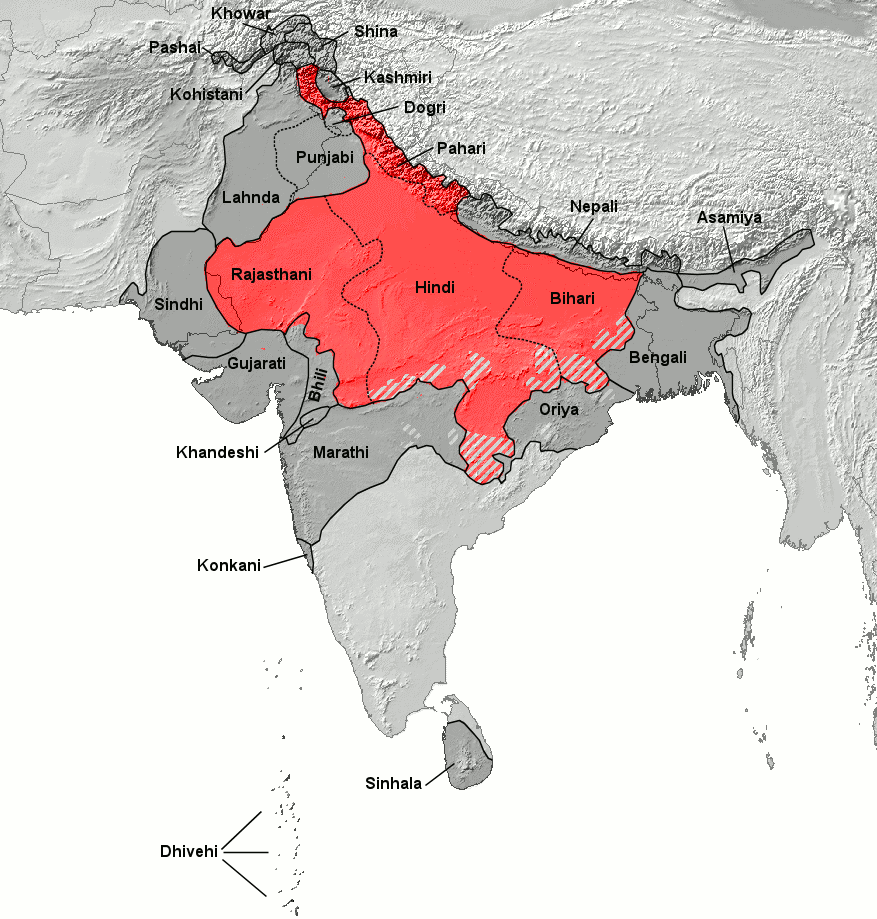
- Area (red) where various languages considered by the census as Hindi are spoken natively
- Country: India
- States and Union Territories: List: Bihar; Chandigarh; Chhattisgarh; Delhi; Haryana; Himachal Pradesh; Jharkhand; Madhya Pradesh; Rajasthan; Uttarakhand; Uttar Pradesh

Area
  - Total: 1,355,456 km^{2} (523,344 sq mi)

Population (2011)
  - Total: 563,766,118
  - Density: 415.9236/km^{2} (1,077.237/sq mi)

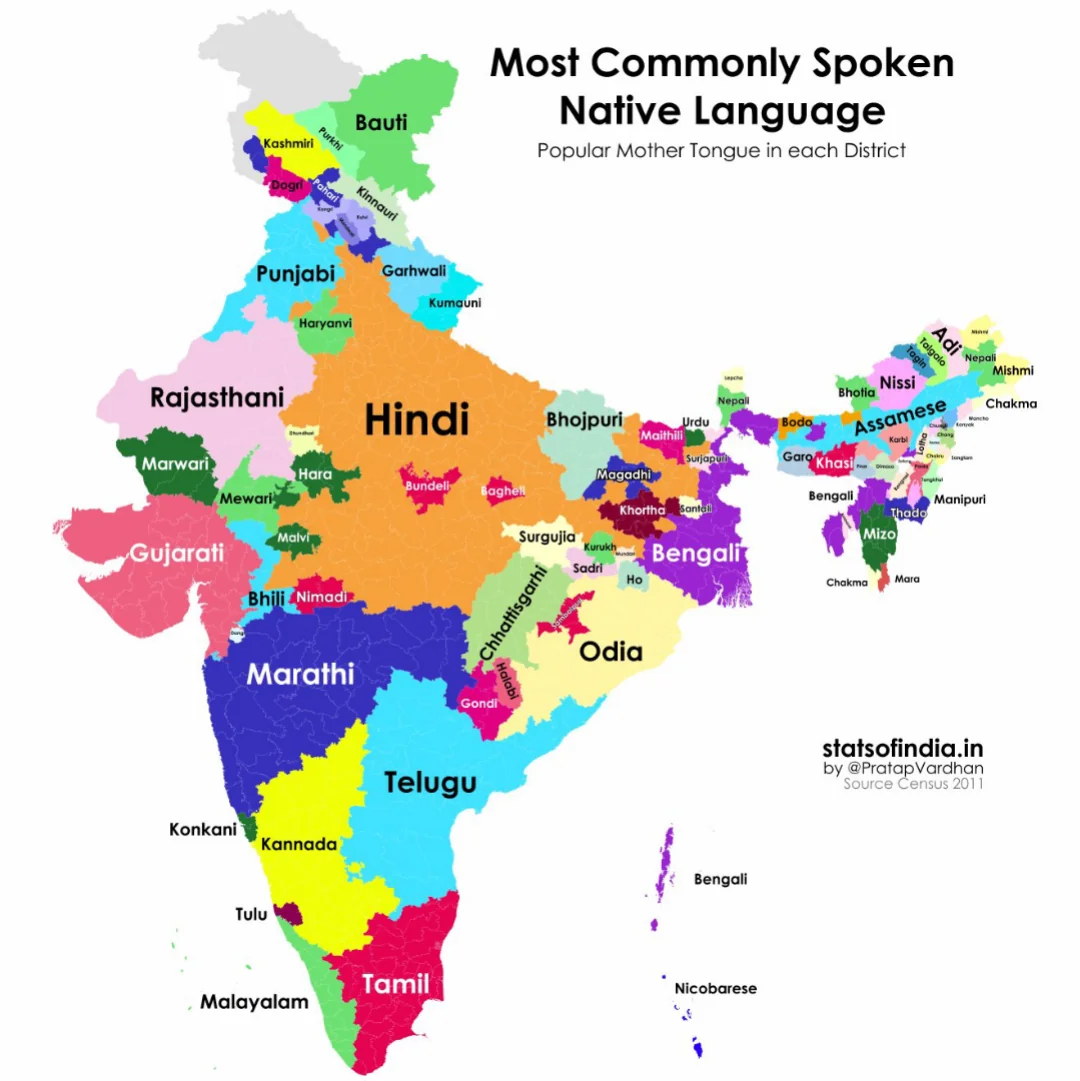
States and union territories of India by the most commonly spoken (L1) first language (Note: Some languages may be over- or underrepresented as the census data used is at the state-level. For example, while Urdu has 52 million speakers (2001), in no state is it a majority, as the language itself is primarily limited to Indian Muslims.)

The Hindi Belt, (Note: Also known as the Hindi Heartland and the Hindi-speaking states.) Hindi–Urdu Belt, or Hindustani Belt is a linguistic region encompassing parts of northern, central, eastern, and western India where various Northern, Central, Eastern and Western Indo-Aryan languages are spoken, which in a broader sense are termed as Hindi languages, with Modern Standard Hindi serving as the lingua franca of the region. This belt includes all the Indian states whose official language is Modern Standard Hindi, namely Bihar, Chhattisgarh, Haryana, Himachal Pradesh, Jharkhand, Madhya Pradesh, Rajasthan, Uttar Pradesh and Uttarakhand, as well as the union territory of Chandigarh and the National Capital Territory of Delhi.

== Hindi as a dialect continuum ==
Hindi is part of the Indo-Aryan dialect continuum that lies within the cultural Hindi Belt in the northern plains of India. This definition of Hindi is one of the ones used in the Indian census, and results in more than forty per cent of Indians being reported to be speakers of Hindi, though Hindi-area respondents vary as to whether they call their language Hindi or the actual name of their language. As defined in the 1991 census, Hindi has a broad and a narrow sense. The term "Hindi" is thus ambiguous. Before being identified as a separate language, Maithili was identified by the census as a Hindi dialect. Many such languages still struggle for recognition.

The broad sense covers a number of Central, East-Central, Eastern, and Northern Indo-Aryan languages, including the Bihari languages except Maithili, all the Rajasthani languages, the Central Pahari languages and most Western Pahari languages. This is an area bounded on the west by Punjabi and Sindhi; on the south by Gujarati, Marathi, and Odia; on the east by Maithili and Bengali; and on the north by Nepali, Dogri, Kashmiri and Tibetic languages. The varieties of this belt are usually considered separate languages, as opposed to dialects of a single language as considered by the Indian census.

In a middle sense, Hindi is equated with the Central Indo-Aryan languages. Based on their linguistic features, these are divided into Western and Eastern Hindi languages. The narrowest definition of Hindi is that of the official language, Modern Standard Hindi, a standardised register of a Western Hindi language spoken around Delhi and Western Uttar Pradesh. Standardised Hindustani—including both Standard Hindi and Urdu—is historically based on the Khariboli of 17th-century Delhi.

=== Number of speakers ===
Population data from the 2011 Indian Census is as follows:

- Central Indo-Aryan
  - Western Hindi languages
    - 240 M Hindi
    - 9.8 M Haryanvi
    - 1.5 M Braj Bhasha
    - 9.5 M Kanauji
    - 5.6 M Bundeli
  - Eastern Hindi languages
    - 4.5 M Awadhi
    - 18.2 M Chhattisgarhi
    - 2.6 M Bagheli
    - 1.7 M Surgujia
- Eastern Indo-Aryan
  - Bihari languages, excluding Maithili
    - 51 M: Bhojpuri
    - 13 M: Magahi
    - 8 M: Khortha
    - 5.1 M: Nagpuri
    - 0.5 M: Kurmali
- Western Indo-Aryan
  - Rajasthani languages
    - 7.8 M Marwari
    - 5.2 M Malvi
    - 2.3 M Nimadi
    - 4.8M Lambadi
    - 2.9 M Hadauti
    - 3 M Godwari
    - 2 M Bagri

According to the 2001 Indian census, 258 million people in India (25% of the population) regarded their native language to be "Hindi", however, including other languages considered by the census as Hindi, this figure becomes 422 million Hindi speakers (41% of the population). These figures do not count 52 million Indians who considered their mother tongue to be "Urdu", which is mutually intelligible with Hindi. The numbers are also not directly comparable to the table above; for example, while independent estimates in 2001 counted 37 million speakers of Awadhi, in the 2001 census only 2½ million of these identified their language as "Awadhi" rather than as "Hindi".

There have been demands to include Awadhi, Bhojpuri, Kumaoni, Bundeli, Chhattisgarhi, Garhwali, Kurmali, Magahi, Nagpuri, and Rajasthani in the Eighth Schedule; these are otherwise regarded as dialects of Hindi by the government, although they have varying levels of mutual intelligibility with standard Hindi. Some academics oppose inclusion of Hindi dialects in the Eighth Schedule of the Constitution as full-fledged Indian languages. According to them, recognition of Hindi dialects as separate languages would deprive Hindi of millions of its speakers and eventually no Hindi will be left.

=== Outside the Indian subcontinent ===
Much of the Hindi spoken outside of the subcontinent is distinct from the Indian standard language. Fiji Hindi is a derived form of Awadhi, Bhojpuri, and including some English and very few native Fijian words. It is spoken by majority of Indo-Fijians. In Mauritius, Bhojpuri is the most commonly spoken Indian language. Once widely spoken as a mother tongue at 31.7% in 1972, it has become less commonly spoken over the years. According to the 2022 census, Bhojpuri was the most commonly spoken language at home for only 5.1% of the population, though the per cent of the population fluent in the language is likely still around 36.7%, according to Anjani Murdan of the Mauritius Times.

== Geography and demography ==
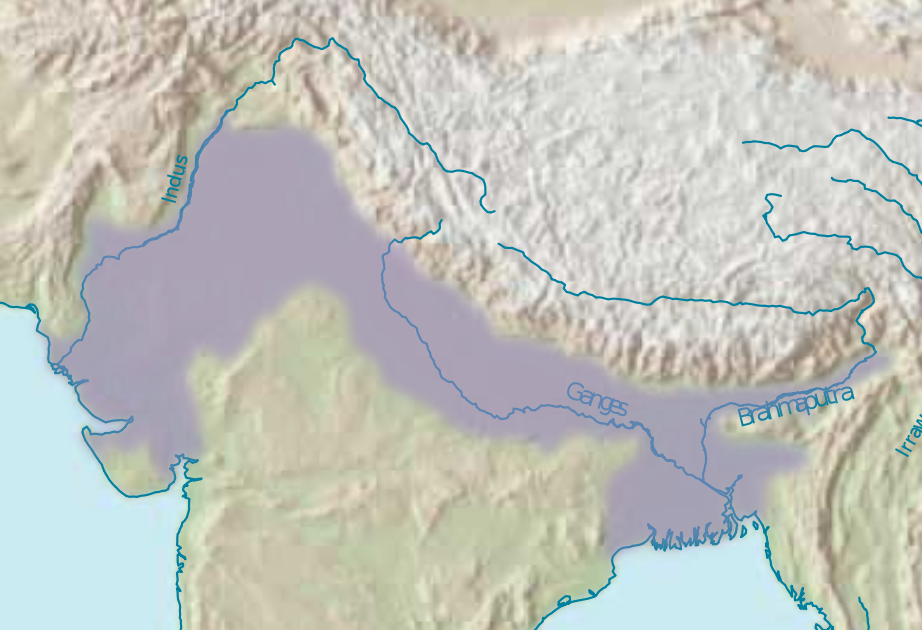
The Indo-Gangetic Plain

The highly fertile, flat, alluvial Indo-Gangetic Plains occupies the northern portion of the Hindi heartland; the Vindhyas in Madhya Pradesh demarcate the southern boundary and the hills and dense forests of Jharkhand and Chhattisgarh lie in the east. The region has a predominantly subtropical climate, with cool winters, hot summers and moderate monsoons. The climate does vary with latitude somewhat, with winters getting cooler and rainfall decreasing. It can vary significantly with altitude, especially in Jharkhand and Chhattisgarh.

The Hindi Heartland supports about a third of India's population and occupies about a quarter of its geographical area. The population is concentrated along the fertile Ganges plain in the states of Uttar Pradesh, Madhya Pradesh, Chhattisgarh, Jharkhand and Bihar.

Although the vast majority of the population is rural, significant urban cities include Chandigarh, Delhi, Lucknow, Kanpur, Raipur, Allahabad, Jaipur, Jodhpur, Agra, Varanasi, Indore, Bhopal, Patna, Jamshedpur and Ranchi. The region hosts a diverse population, with various dialects of Hindi being spoken along with other Indian languages, and a multi-religious population including Hindus, Muslims, Sikhs along with people from various castes and a significant tribal population.

== Political sphere ==
Political development and climate in these states since Indian independence has been dominated by caste and religious-based politics.

The term "Hindi Belt" overlaps with "Cow Belt", a slang and pejorative in Indian politics, owing to the importance the issue of cattle slaughter receives in these regions compared to other political issues. Politically these states have been mostly been dominated by mainstream national parties like Indian National Congress and Bharatiya Janata Party. They also have been crucial for winning national elections due to their relatively large population size and political influence.

== See also ==
- Languages of India
- Devanagari
- Indian literature
- Indo-Aryan languages
- Hindustani-speaking world

== Bibliography ==
- Grierson, G. A. Linguistic Survey of India Vol I-XI, Calcutta, 1928, ISBN 81-85395-27-6
- Masica, Colin (1991), The Indo-Aryan Languages, Cambridge: Cambridge University Press, ISBN 978-0-521-29944-2.
- Shapiro, Michael C. (2003), "Hindi", in Cardona, George; Jain, Dhanesh (eds.), The Indo-Aryan Languages, Routledge, pp. 250–285, ISBN 978-0-415-77294-5.
