= Kesariyaji =

Śvētāmbara Jain temple in the state of Rajasthan

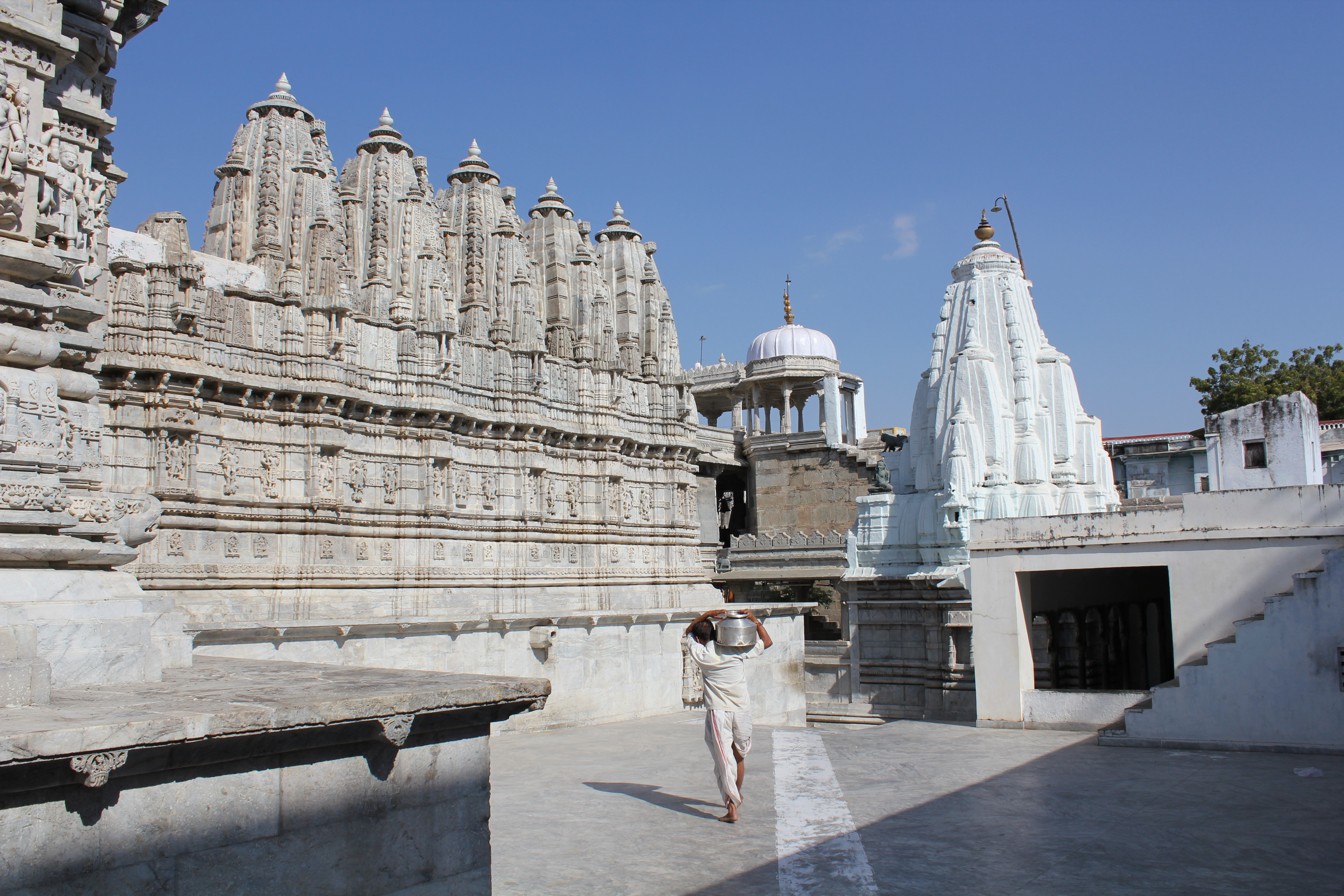
- Shree Kesariyaji Tirth

- Location within Rajasthan

Religion
- Affiliation: Jainism
- Sect: Digambara and Śvētāmbara
- Deity: Rishabhanatha
- Festival: Mahavir Janma Kalyanak

Location
- Location: Rishabhdeo, Udaipur District, Rajasthan
- Coordinates: 24°04′35″N 73°41′22″E

Architecture
- Creator: Rawal Khuyan
- Established: 874 CE

Specifications
- Temple: 5
- Materials: Marble, limestone

Website
- www.rishabhdeo.com

Kesariyaji Tirth or Rishabhdeo Jain temple is a Jain temple located in Rishabhdeo town of Udaipur District of Indian state of Rajasthan. The temple is considered an important pilgrimage center by both Digambara and Śvētāmbara sect of Jainism. Further, Rajasthan High Court, in its judgment dated 30 March 1966, stated that it was, indisputably, a Śvētāmbara Jain temple.

== History ==
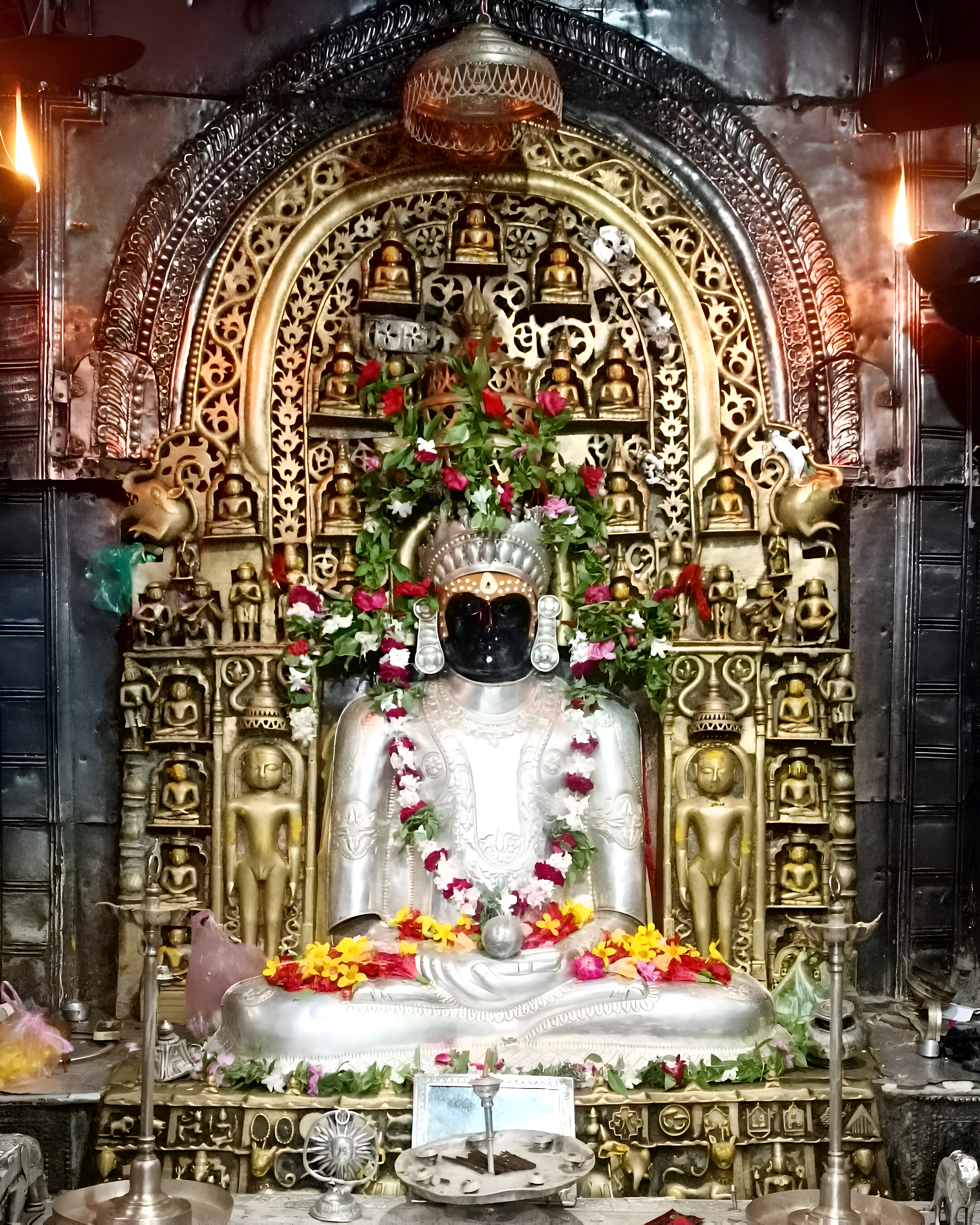
The idol of Kesariya Adinath at Kesariyaji Rishabhdeo Jain Tirth at Dhuleva, Rajasthan

The temple was constructed in 874 CE (VS 931) during the reign of Rawal Khuyan, the ruler of Mewar. The temple received patronage from rich merchants since its situated on an important trade route from the coast to the state of Mewar. An inscription dated back to 1422 CE, indicates repairs and renovations were made to the temple during the 14th to 15th centuries. It is also believed to have been worshipped by Ravana in Nandan Vana and having been installed at Ujjain by King Śrīpāla. Since 14th century, there has been a history of conflict over control of this temple between members of Digambara, Śvētāmbara and Hindus community based on relation with rulers of Mewar. However, on 30 March 1966, Rajasthan High Court declared that it was a Śvetāmbara Jain temple. The Supreme Court of India has conclusively declared that the Rishabhdev/Keshariya Nathji Temple is a Jain temple and not a Hindu temple.

== Discovery of idol ==
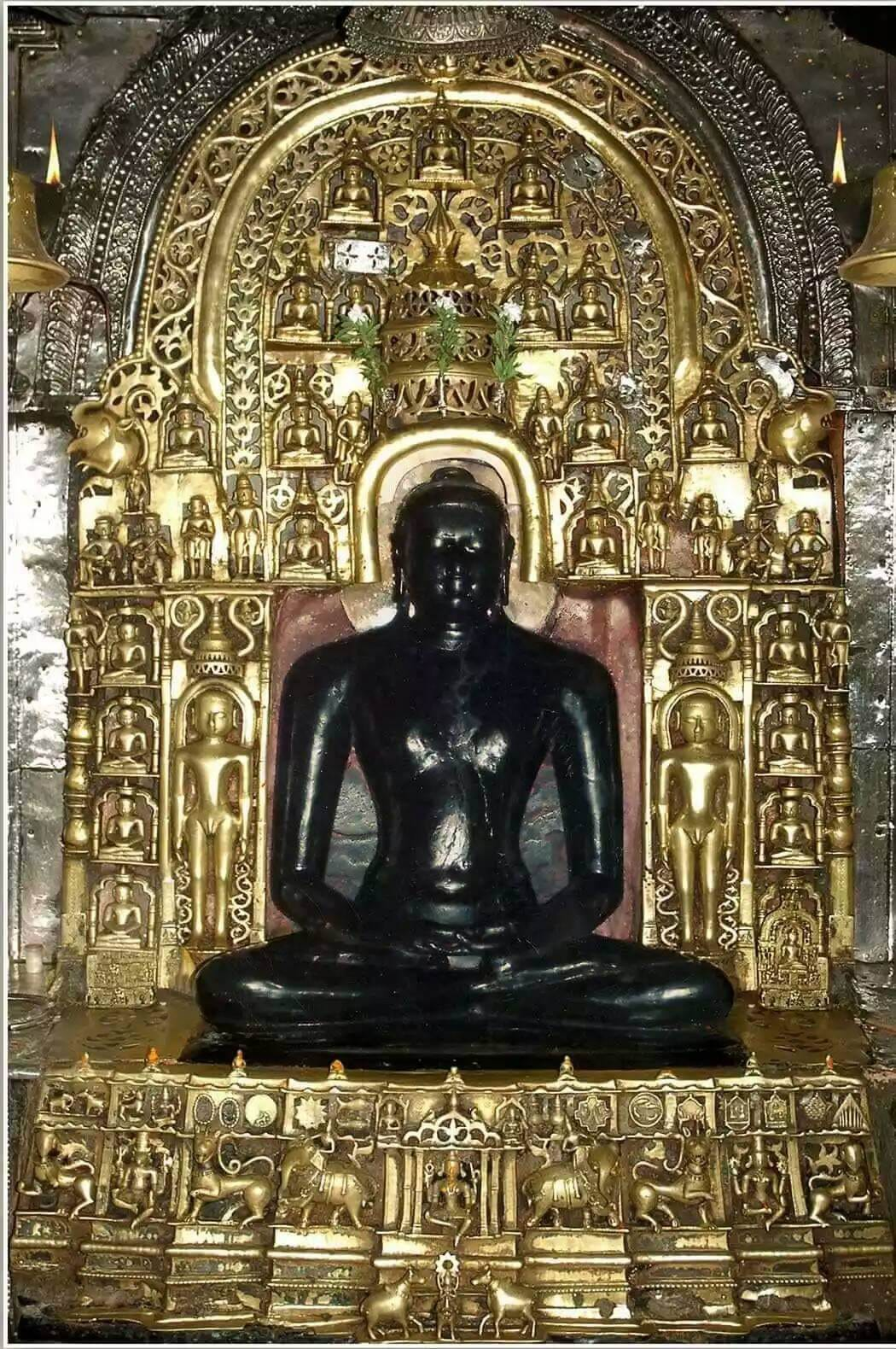
Idol Worship Rituals in the Digambara Tradition

The main idol of the temple, popularly known as Kesariyaji, is a 1.05 metres (3 ft 5 in) black stone idol of Adinatha or Rishabhanatha in lotus position.

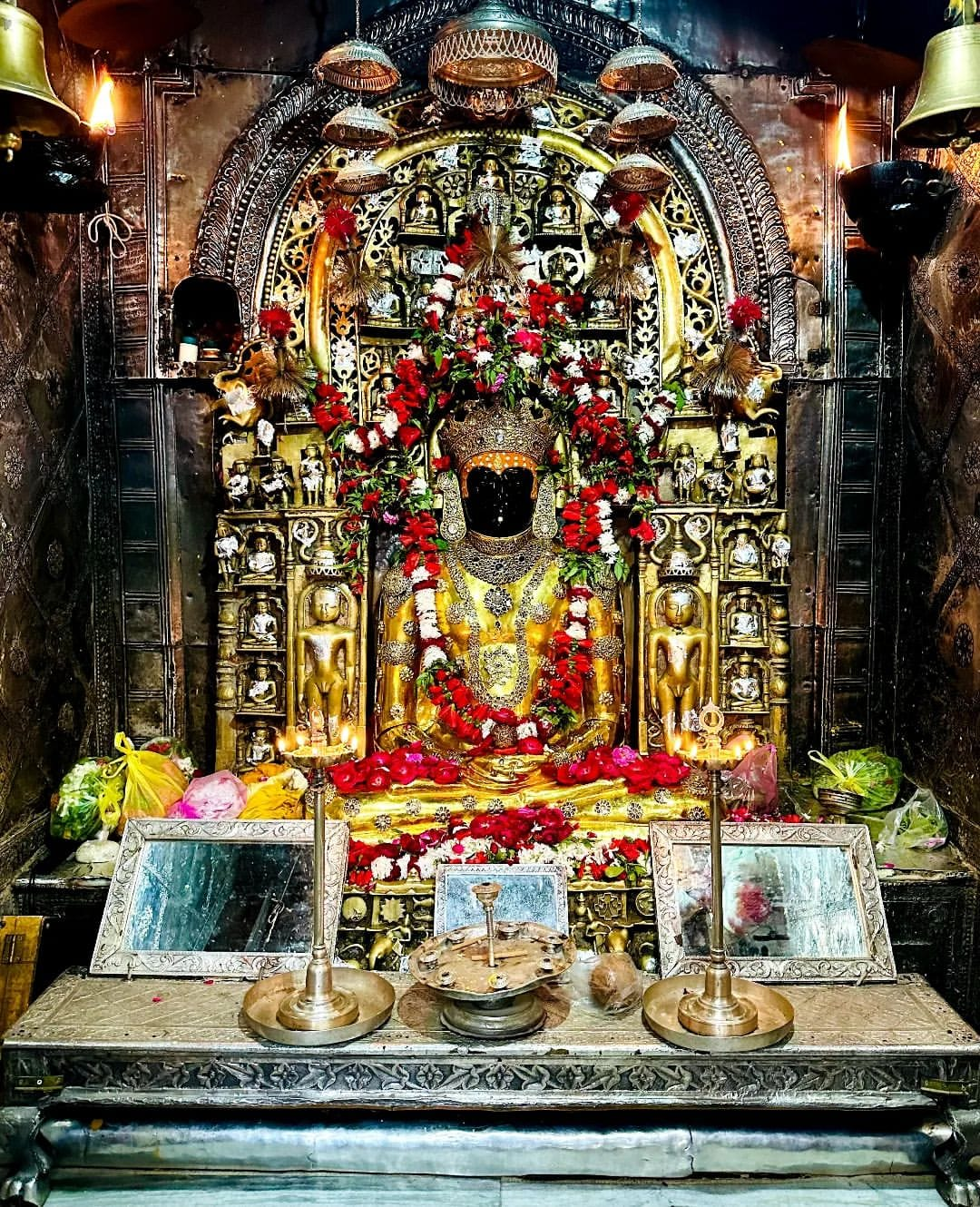
The idol of Kesariya Adinath decorated as per Śvetāmbara Jain customs and rituals at Dhuleva, Rajasthan

The iconic idol of Lord Rishabhanatha, the principal deity of the pilgrimage temple, was found during an excavation. A Bhil dairy farmer noticed that one of his cows was always dry of milk. When cow belonging used to pour out its milk every day upon a mound near Chandanpur village. It was surprising for the owner of that cow and the villagers. They excavated the mound. The villagers dedicated themselves to building a small hut over the idol where the idol was found. The place is now known as paglia-ji or chharan chatri.

== Architecture ==
The temple has an ornate architecture. The temple has a large domical structure as the principal shrine with domical 52 sub-shrine along the axis of principal shrine. In the parikrama path there are idols of Charbhuja (four armed) Vishnu, Parshvanatha, Somnath Shiva. The pillared porch features Nava chowki (nine seats) with idols of Ajitnatha, Sambhavanatha, Sumatinatha and Neminatha. The shafts of the pillars are richly carved. The Shikara of the temple is crowned by amalaka. The temple also features a richly carved torana.

== About the temple ==
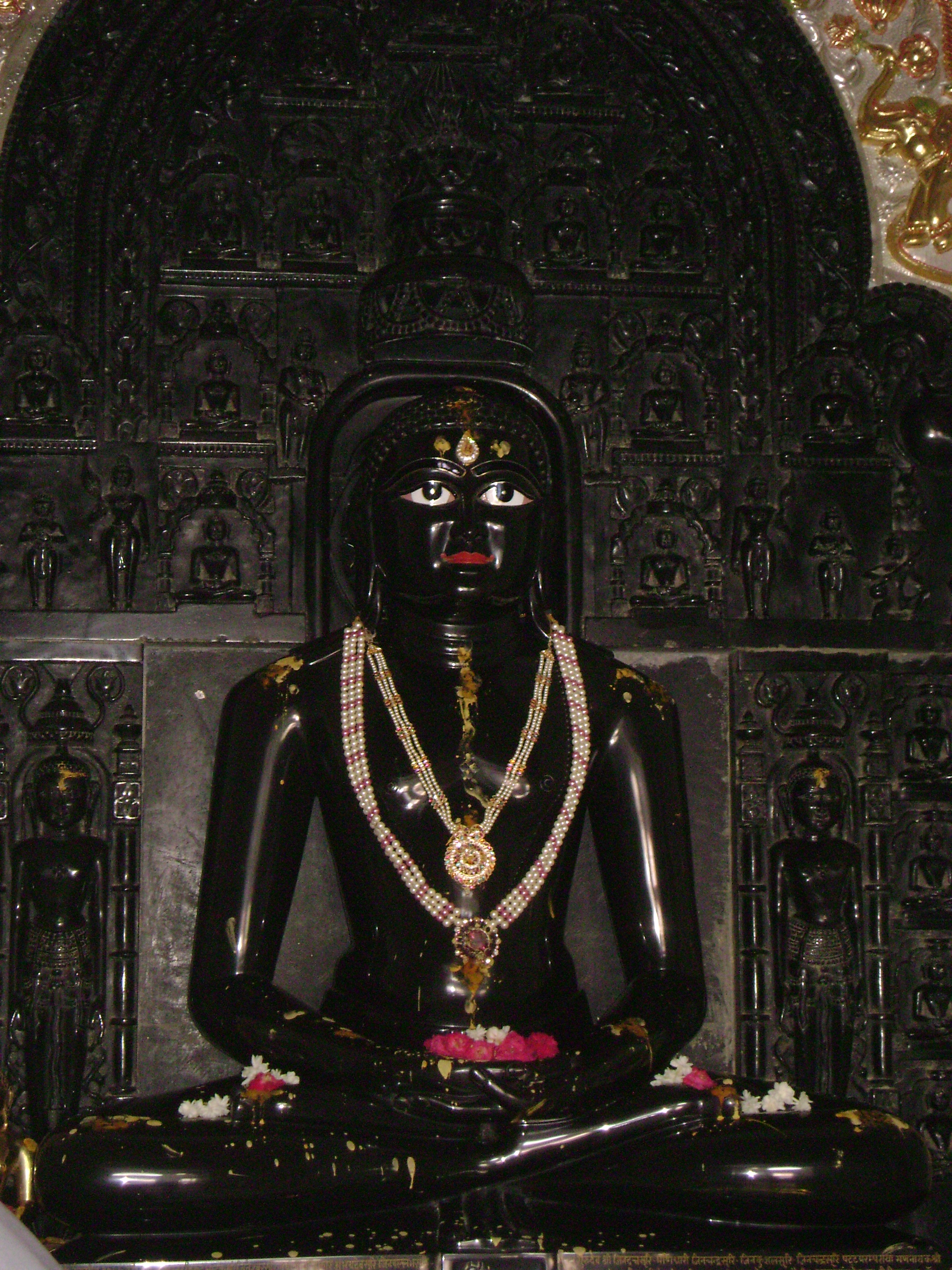
Kesariyaji idol replica inside Gaj Mandir situated near the main temple

The temple is considered an important pilgrimage center by both Digambara and Śvētāmbara sect of Jainism and Hindus. The mulnayak of the temple is a 1.05 metres (3 ft 5 in) black stone idol of Rishabhanatha, revered by both Vaishnavas and Jains. Kesariyaji is the name of Rishabhanatha idol inside the temple. The name is derived from the instance of a man of offering kesar (transl. saffron) equal to his son's weight when his wish of having a child is fulfilled. According to another legend, a Brahmin once threw a coin at idol saying "if you have any strength you will show it me", the coin flew back hit Brahmin head.

The idol is considered miraculous and according Jain belief praying to the idol fulfills the wishes of devotees. The saffron and garland is profusely applied to the idol for worship. The replicas of Kesariyaji Rishabhanatha is popular among Śvētāmbara murtipujaka. According to Jain belief, worshipping these local replication idols allow them to directly worship to the original idol.

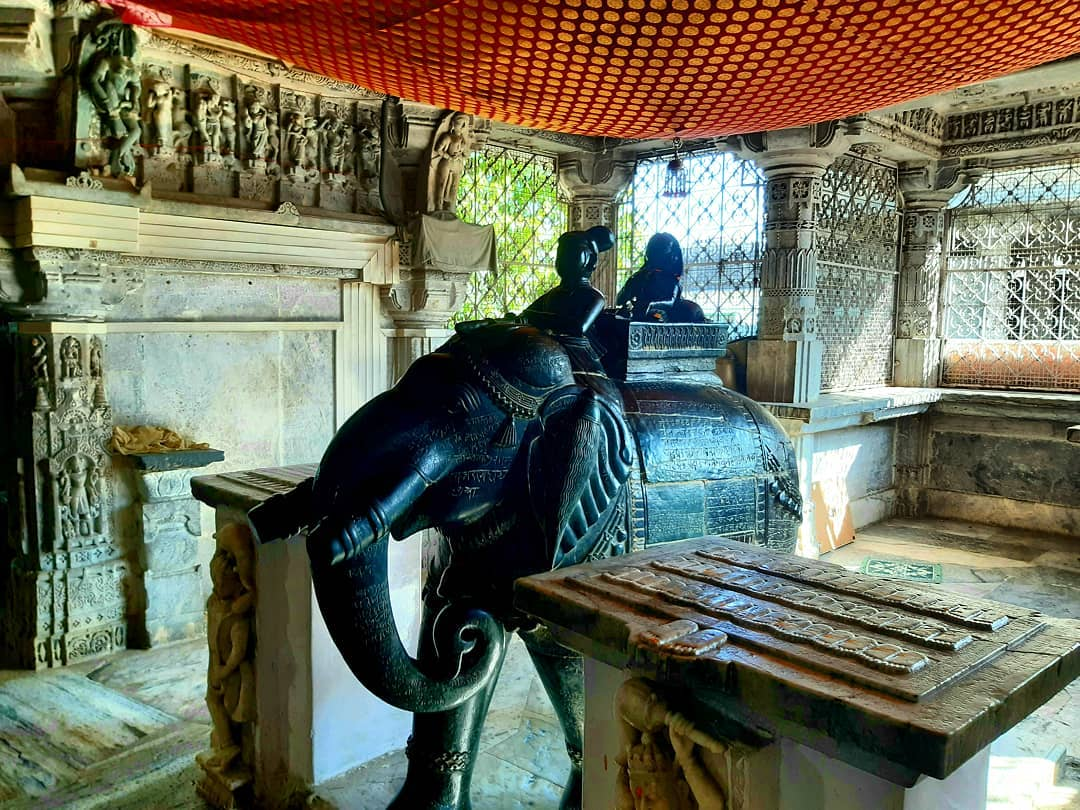
Depiction of Marudevi's omniscience and liberation as per the Śvētāmbara belief at Kesariyaji Śvētāmbara Jain Tirth, Dhuleva

In front the principal shrine there is an idol of Marudevi, mother of Rishabhanatha, seated on an elephant corroborating the belief of Marudevi attaining omniscience and moksha while seated on an elephant as per the Śvetāmbara tradition. However, the statue of Marudevi, seated on an elephant, was added much later, around VS 1711, which corresponds to 1654 CE.

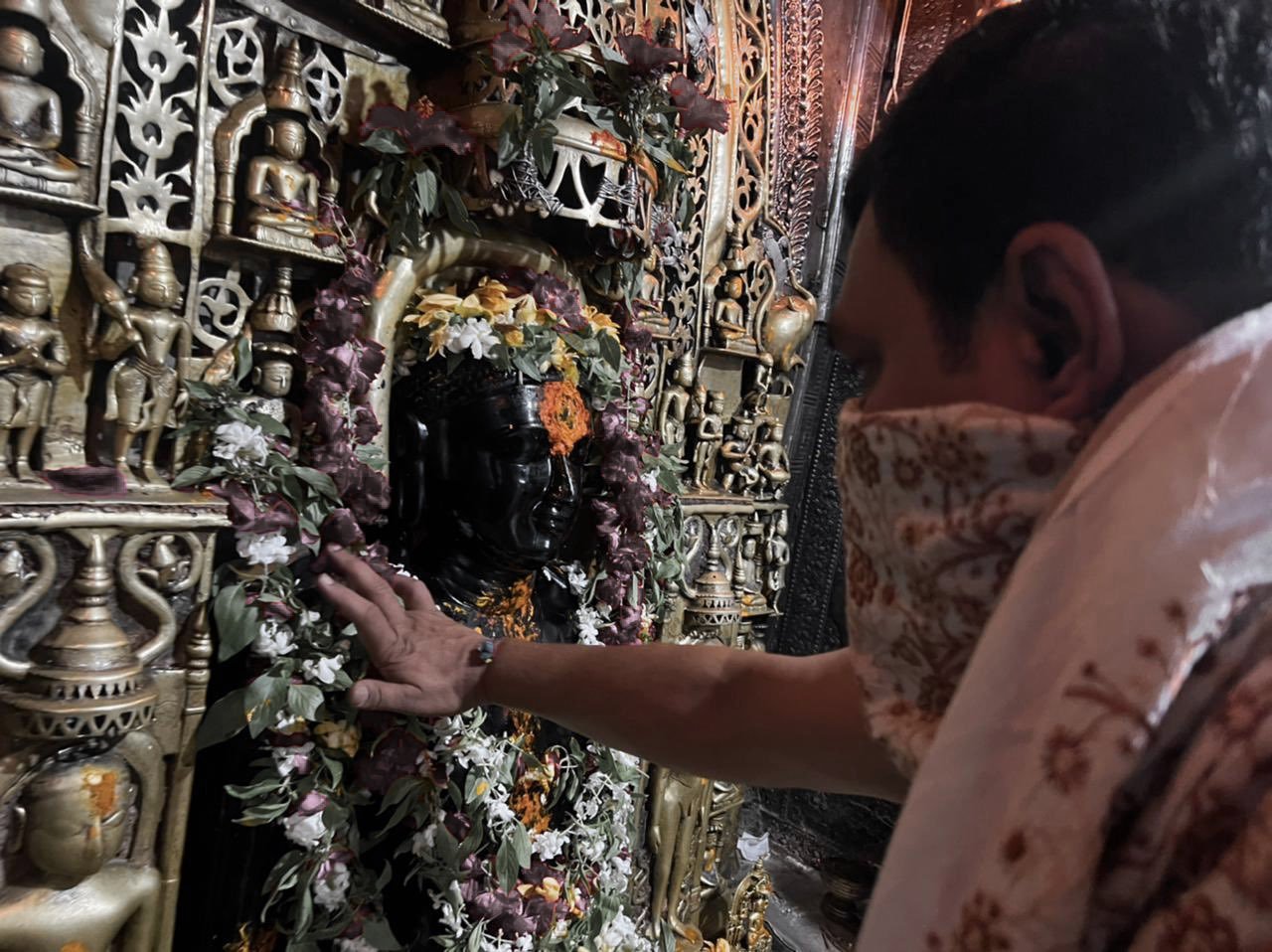
A Śvetāmbara lay follower performing 'Anga Puja' of the idol of Kesariyaji by anointing the idol with saffron and sandalwood mixture as per ancient rituals of Kesariyaji temple and of the Śvetāmbara sect

The temple also has a dharamshala equipped with all modern facilities, including bhojanalaya (a restaurant). There is a temple known as Pagliyaji, housing footprints of Rishabhanatha inside a chhatri.

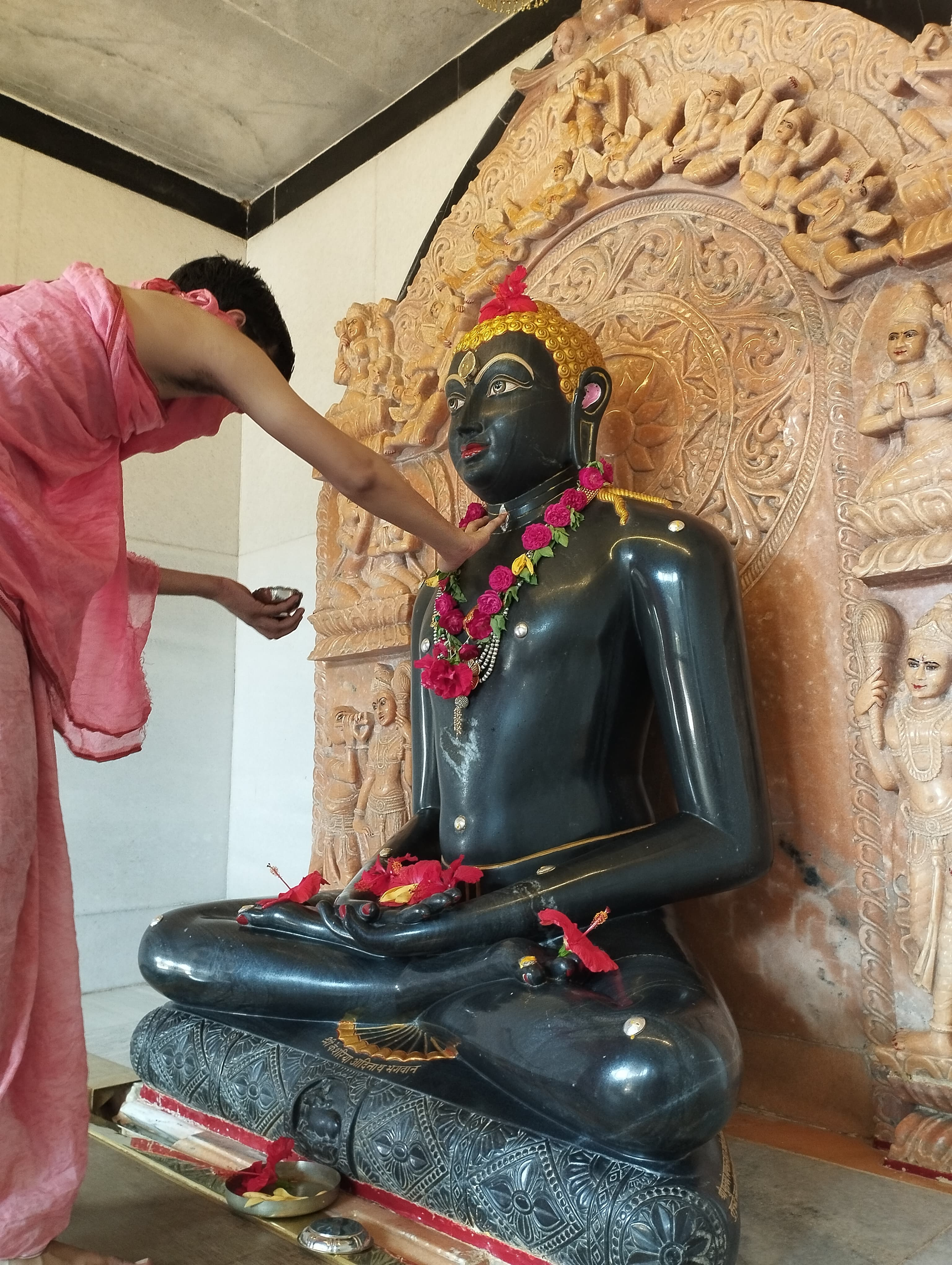
A Śvetāmbara Śrāvaka performing pooja of replica of Kesariyaji at Manas Mandir - Bhuvanbhanu Jain Temple Shatrunjay Tirtha, Shahpur, Karade, Maharashtra

== Conflicts ==
The nature of the temple has been an issue between Digambara, Śvētāmbara and Hindus. The Śvētāmbara murtipujaka Acharya Tirthavijaya endeavoured to free Kesariyaji from the control of Brahmin community and returned to Jain. The temple also houses images of Hindu deities. The temple is also visited by members of the Bhil community. They only worship Hindu idols except for the Rishabhanatha idol. However, Rishabhanatha is worshipped as a Kala-ji or Bhomia, a protective deity of land and soil.

== Fair ==
A fair is organised here on the birth anniversary of Rishabhanatha and draws a huge number of devotees. A rath yatra is organised from the main temple to Pagliyaji temple.

== See also ==
- Nakodaji
- Shri Mahavirji
