= Hindustani-speaking world =

Hindustani-Speaking World
- हिंदुस्तानी-भाषी दुनिया ہندوستانی بولنے والی دنیا
- Geographic distribution: South Asia, Fiji, The Caribbean, The Arabian Peninsula
- Native speakers: over 600 million
- Linguistic classification: Indo-European: Hindustani-Speaking World

Language codes
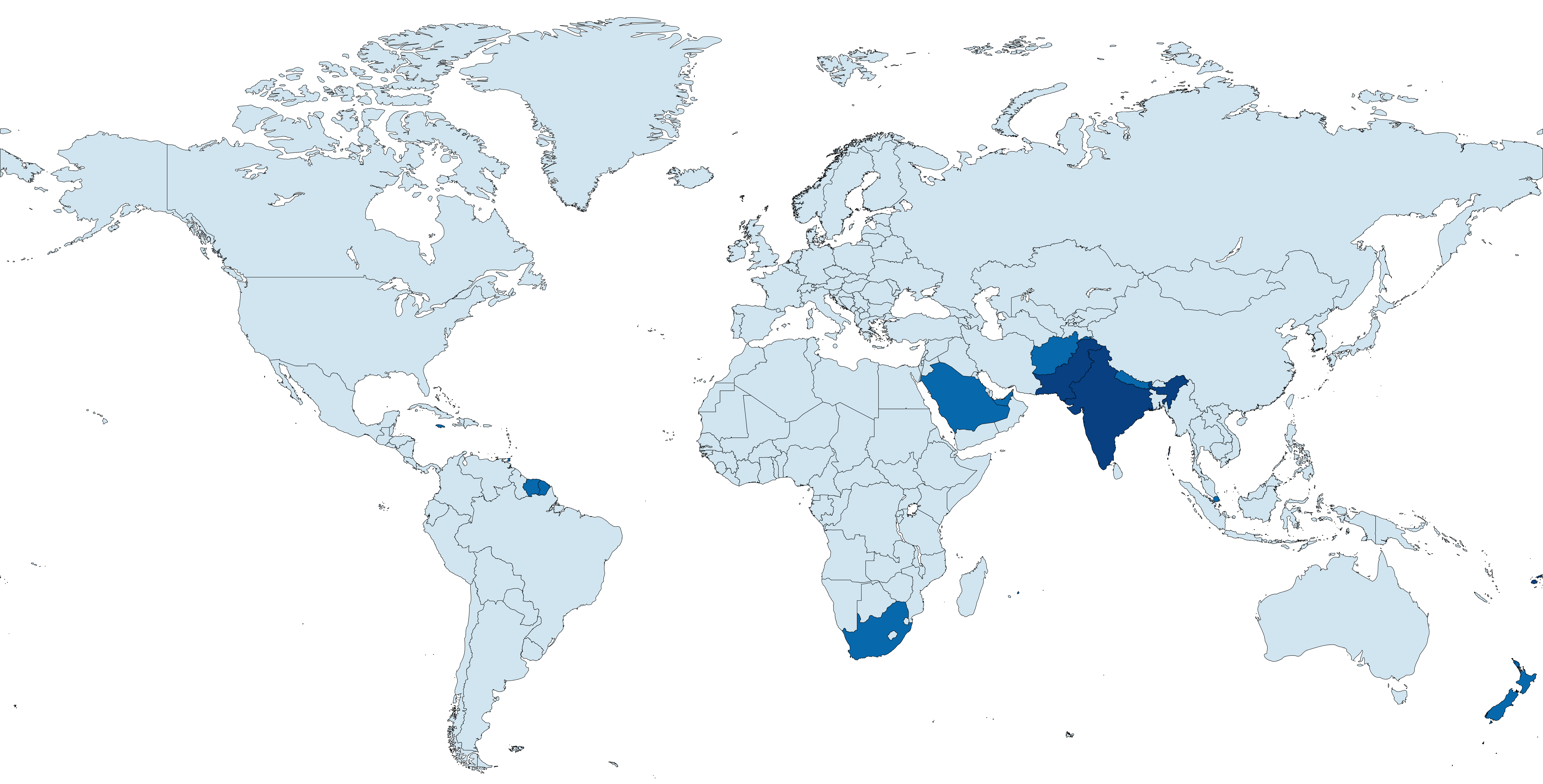
- Geographical Distribution Majority/Official language Significant Minority/Recognized language Minority language (<1%)

The Hindustani-speaking world encompasses the regions where the Hindustani continuum is spoken. This includes countries and territories where in its various forms (including Standard Hindi and Standard Urdu), it serves as an official, administrative, cultural, or widely spoken language.

== Background ==
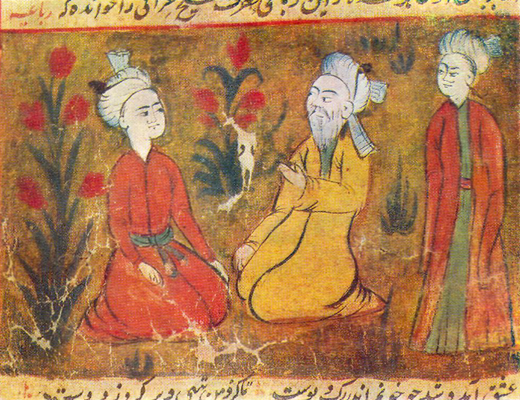
Amir Khusrau, one of the earliest writers in the Hindavi language.

The Hindustani language emerged as a result of the historical interactions between various linguistic and cultural groups in the Indian subcontinent. It developed during the medieval period, influenced by the languages of the Indo-Aryan family, Iranian, Arabic, and Turkic languages, particularly during the Mughal Empire. The language has two standardized forms: Hindi, which is written in the Devanagari script, and Urdu, which is written in the Perso-Arabic script. Both forms share a significant amount of vocabulary and grammar, making them mutually intelligible.

Before 1947, the British Raj officially recognized Hindustani (which was equated with Urdu). In the post-independence era, however, the term Hindustani has gone out of use and is accorded no official status by either the Indian or Pakistani governments. Rather, the language is officially recognized by its two main standardized registers, Hindi and Urdu.

This idea of the Hindustani language as "unifying language" or "fusion language" that would be "above" communal and religious differences throughout the subcontinent was supported by Mahatma Gandhi, since it was not perceived to be a part of the Hindu community or the Muslim community like in the case of Hindi and Urdu respectively, and was also perceived to be a simpler language for people to learn. The translation from Urdu into Hindi (or the reverse) is mostly done by simply transliterating from both scripts or translation which is typically necessary for religious and literary texts.

== Statistics ==
As of 2023, Hindi and Urdu combined are the 3rd-most-spoken language in the world after English and Mandarin with 843 million native and second-language speakers, as per Ethnologue. The number of Hindi-Urdu speakers was 300 million in 1995, placing Hindustani as the third-most spoken language globally.

Native speakers of Hindustani by country
Country or territory	Number of Native speakers	%	Status	Notes & References
Afghanistan	829,000	2%	Minority Language	
Fiji	460,000	37.6%	Official Language (Hindi)	
Mauritius	79,539	6.1%	Minority Language	Bhojpuri is considered a dialect of Hindustani.
India	456,156,264	48%	Official Language (Hindi); Scheduled Language (Urdu)	Total native speakers of Hindi & Urdu.
Pakistan	22,332,193	9.3%	National Language (Urdu)	
UAE	441,000	4.2%	Court Language (Hindi)	
Canada	321,465	0.9%	Minority Language	
Trinidad and Tobago	61,000	4.4%	Minority Language	Trinidadian Hindustani
Jamaica	54,000	1.9%	Minority Language	
Suriname	150,000	24%	Minority Language	Sarnámi Hindustáni
French Guiana	6,000	1.9%	Minority Language	
Nepal	870,399	3%	Minority Language	Awadhi and Bhojpuri are considered separate in Nepal's Census.
Saudi Arabia	845,000	2.1%	Minority Language	
Australia	221,684	0.8%	Minority Language	
New Zealand	84,000	1.6%	Minority Language	
United Kingdom	344,654	0.5%	Minority Language	
United States	1,372,802	0.4%	Minority Language	
Total	484,630,000	5.9%	-	-

== Geographical distribution ==
=== Asia ===
==== India ====
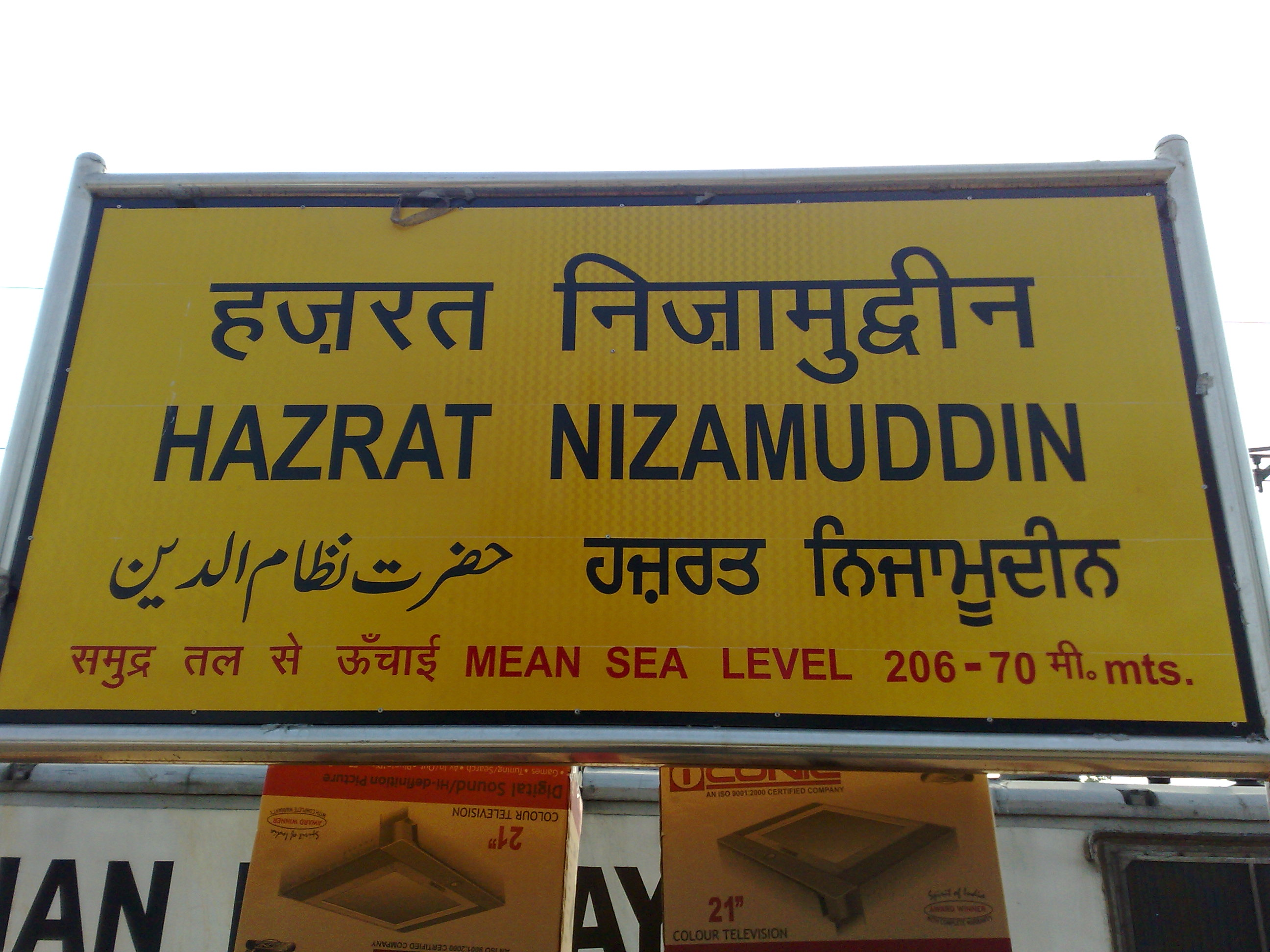
A multilingual signboard from Hazrat Nizamuddin railway station, Delhi, depicting Hindi in the Devanagari script (top) and Urdu in the Nastaliq script (bottom-left).

Hindi is spoken widely across India, particularly in the northern and central regions. It is the primary language in states such as Uttar Pradesh, Bihar, Madhya Pradesh, and Delhi. According to the 2011 census of India, Hindi is the most spoken language in the country, spoken by more than 40% of the nation's total population. It is also the nation's fastest growing language. Urdu is also a significant language, particularly in states like Uttar Pradesh, Telangana, and Jammu and Kashmir, with around 5% of the population identifying it as their first language.

==== Pakistan ====
In Pakistan, Urdu serves as the National language and is spoken by approximately 9% of the population as a first language, while it is understood by a much larger segment of the population, serving as the nation's Lingua franca. Urdu is the medium of instruction in schools and is used in government and media.

==== Nepal ====
In Nepal, Hindustani is spoken primarily in the Terai region. Hindi is widely understood and used in media, education, and daily communication among the Nepali population, particularly among the Madhesi community.

==== Afghanistan ====
In Afghanistan, a significant number of speakers use Urdu, particularly around the city of Kabul. The language reflects the influence of India's Bollywood culture, and also of the Afghan refugees in Pakistan who studied Urdu and became exposed to Urdu media.

==== Bangladesh ====
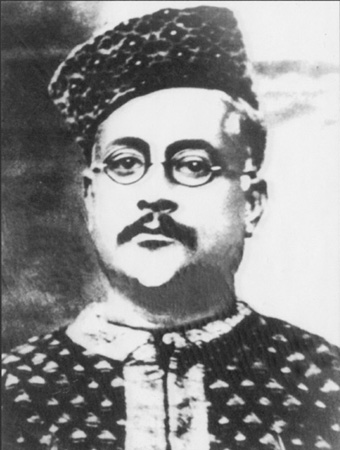
Hakim Habibur Rahman, one of the leading Urdu writers from Dhaka.

In Bangladesh, the Dhakaiya Urdu dialect is still spoken around Old Dhaka. Further, Hindi is popular due to the influence of Bollywood movies.

==== Saudi Arabia ====
In Saudi Arabia, a significant number of expatriates from India and Pakistan speak Hindustani. The language serves as a means of communication among the South Asian diaspora in the country.

=== Europe ===
==== United Kingdom ====
Immigration from the Indian subcontinent from British Raj times has resulted in a growing popularity for the language in the UK. However the history of the language take roots in the early 1800s, when Urdu was taught as a foreign language as a requirement to join the Indian Civil Service. Since the 20th century, it has become standardised for education from a primary level to a PhD in Urdu. It is also considered as the lingua franca among British South Asians, particularly British Pakistanis.

==== Netherlands ====
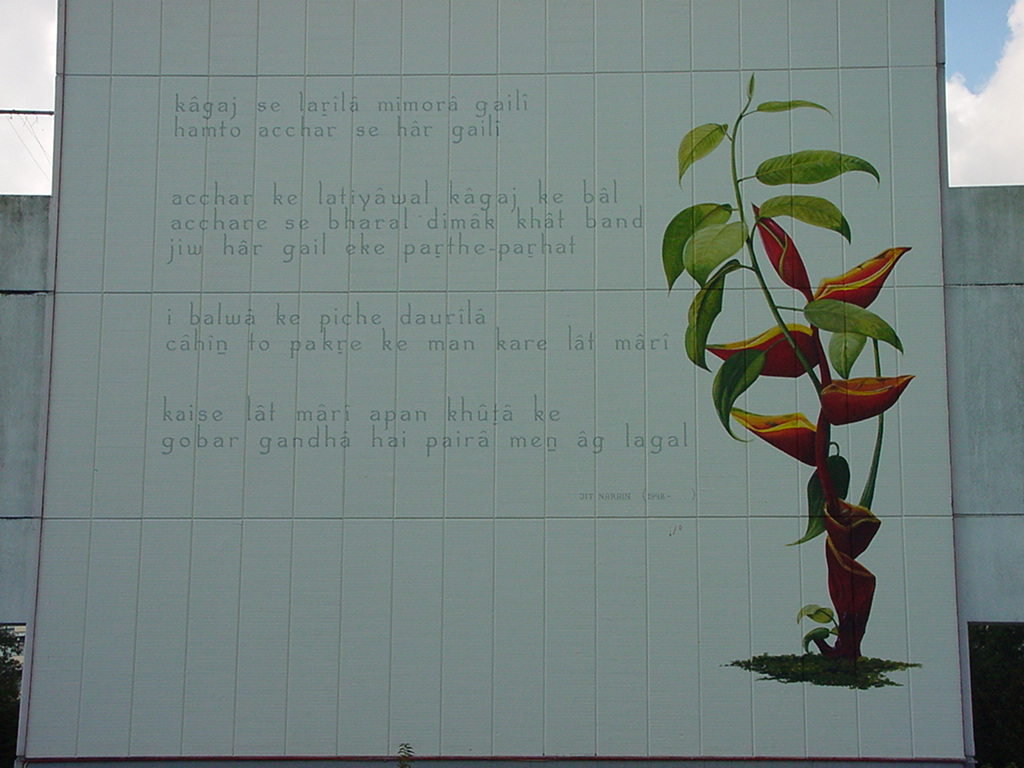
Wall poem in Leiden by Jit Narain in Sarnami

In the Netherlands, the Caribbean Hindustani dialect, mainly Sarnami is spoken by Dutch Indo-Caribbeans, due to immigration from Suriname and the Netherlands Antilles.

=== North America ===
==== Canada ====
In Canada, about 300,000 people speak Hindustani, with a growing number due to immigration. Significant populations are found in cities like Toronto and Vancouver.

==== United States ====
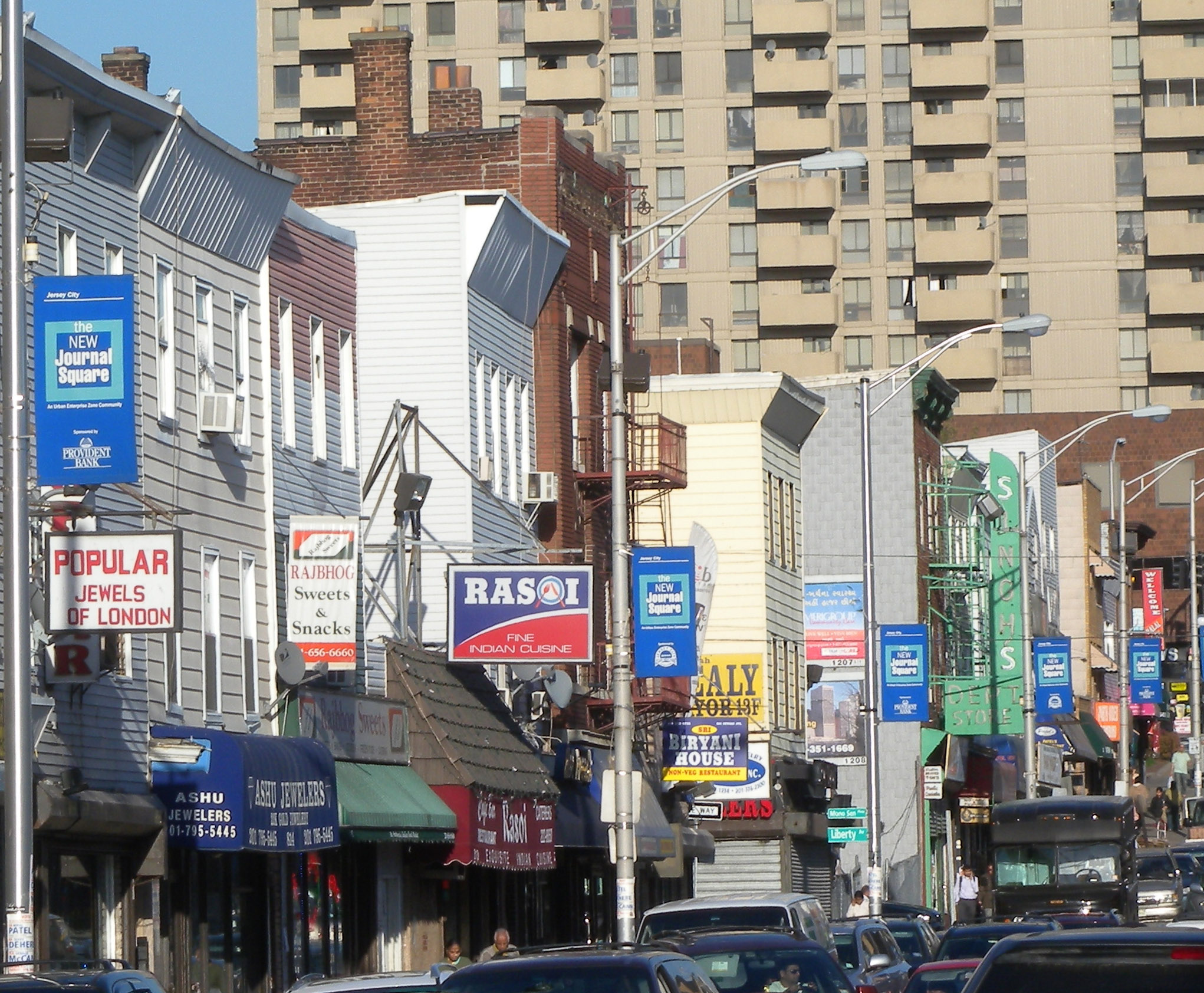
India Square in Jersey City, New Jersey, the most densely populated Indian-populated region in the Western Hemisphere.

In the United States, around a million people speak Hindustani, primarily among the South Asian diaspora. Communities are concentrated in states like California, New York, and New Jersey.

==== Trinidad and Tobago ====
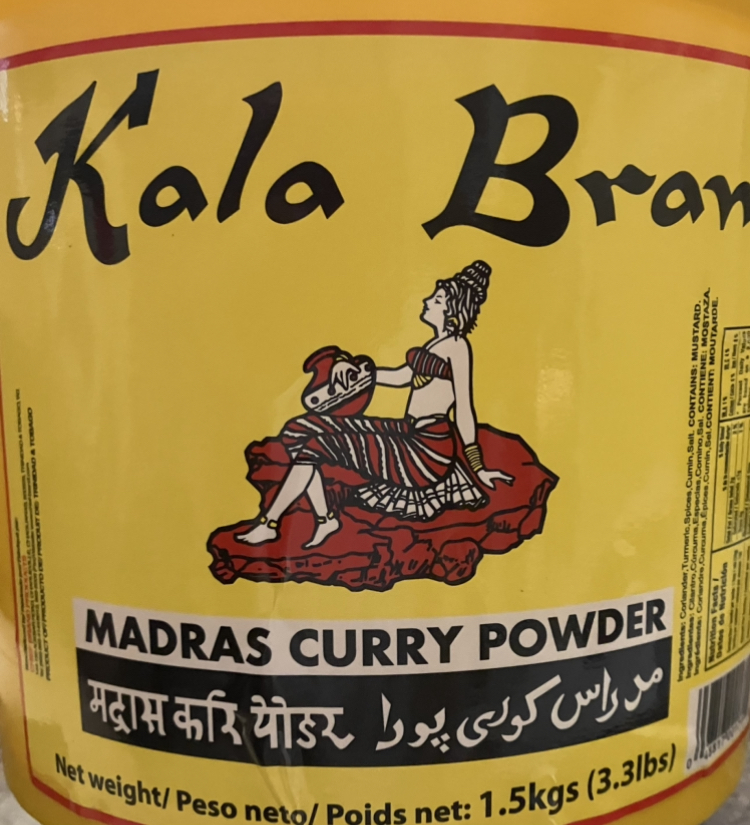
Trinidadian Hindustani text in the Devanagari and Perso-Arabic script on a bucket of curry powder from Trinidad and Tobago.

In Trinidad and Tobago, The Caribbean Hindustani dialect is spoken among the Indo–Trinidadian community. The language is often used in cultural and religious contexts, reflecting the heritage of Indian Indentured laborers.

=== South America ===
==== Suriname ====
In Suriname, a dialect of Caribbean Hindustani called Sarnami Hindustani is spoken by the Indo-Surinamese community, which traces its roots to Indian indentured laborers. The language is used in cultural practices and is an important part of the community's identity. Compared to other dialcets of Caribbean Hindustani, Sarnami is still widely spoken in Suriname and its diaspora.

==== Guyana ====
In Guyana, a dialect of Caribbean Hindustani called Guyanese Hindustani or as it is locally called Aili Gaili, is spoken by some members of the Indo-Guyanese community, mostly by the older generation.

=== Oceania ===
==== Fiji ====
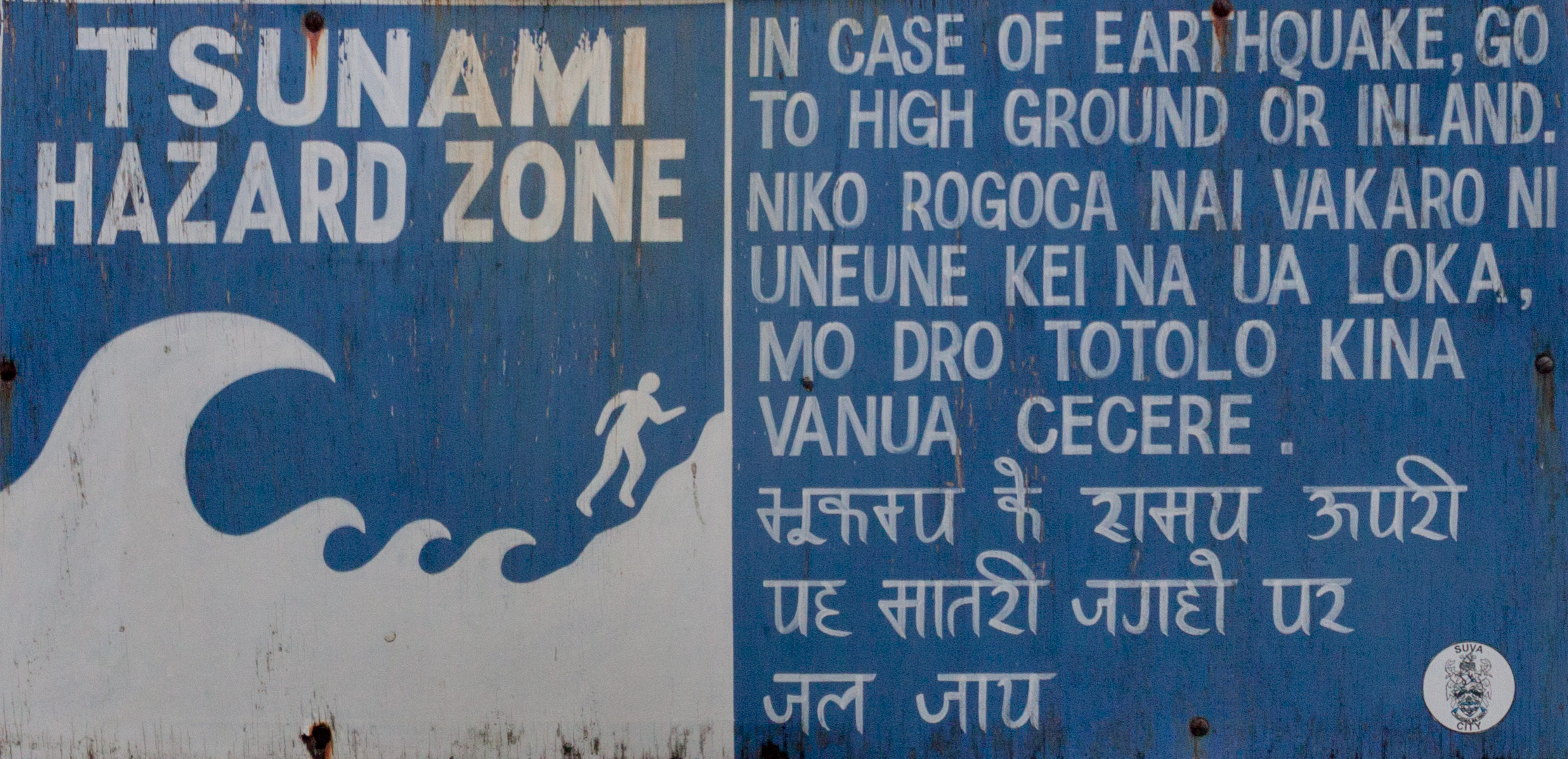
"Tsunami Hazard Zone" sign in Suva, Fiji.

In Fiji, a dialect of Hindustani called Fiji Hindi is spoken by Indo-Fijians. This was a result of Indian indentured labourers who mainly spoke dialects from the Hindi Belt. It is considered as an Official language in Fiji.

==== Australia ====
In Australia, the Hindustani-speaking population has been growing due to immigration from the Indian subcontinent and Fiji. Hindi is spoken by a considerable number of people, particularly within the Indian community.

== See also ==
- Hindustani belt
- Hindustani classical music
- History of Hindustani language
