= Nakoda, Maharashtra =

Village in Maharashtra

Nakoda
- city
- Location in Maharashtra, India
- Coordinates: 19.9308°N 79.1268°E
- Country: India
- State: Maharashtra
- District: Chandrapur

Population (2001)
  - Total: 5,949

Languages
  - Official: Marathi
- Time zone: UTC+5:30 (IST)
- Literacy: 76%

Nakoda is a census town in Chandrapur district in the Indian state of Maharashtra.

== Demographics ==
As of 2001 India census, Nakoda had a population of 5949. Males constitute 53% of the population and females 47%. Nakoda has an average literacy rate of 76%, higher than the national average of 59.5%: male literacy is 82%, and female literacy is 69%. In Nakoda, 11% of the population is under 6 years of age.

Year	Male	Female	Total Population	Change	Religion (%)							
Year	Male	Female	Total Population	Change	Hindu	Muslim	Christian	Sikhs	Buddhist	Jain	Other religions and persuasions	Religion not stated
2001	3183	2819	6002	-	76.191	6.215	2.449	0.167	14.962	0.017	0.000	0.000
2011	2947	2687	5634	-0.061	73.518	9.017	2.272	0.089	15.034	0.000	0.000	0.071
