= Motilal Banarsidass =

Publishing house on Sanskrit and Indology in Delhi, India

- Founded: 1903
- Founder: Motilal Jain
- Successor: Banarsidass Jain
- Country of origin: India
- Headquarters location: A-44, Naraina Industrial Area, Phase-1, New Delhi-110028
- Distribution: Worldwide
- Key people: Rajendra Prakash Jain and Varun Jain
- Nonfiction topics: Buddhology, Indology, Oriental studies, Sanskrit
- Official website: www.mlbd.in

Motilal Banarsidass Publishing House (MLBD) is an Indian academic publishing house based in Delhi, India. Founded in Lahore, Punjab (now Punjab, Pakistan) in 1903, it publishes and distributes serials, monographs, and scholarly publications on Asian religions, Buddhology, Indology, Eastern philosophy, history, culture, arts, architecture, archaeology, language, literature, linguistics, musicology, mysticism, yoga, tantra, occult, medicine, astronomy, and astrology.

Amongst its publications are the 100 volumes of the Mahapuranas; the 50 volumes of the Sacred Books of the East, edited by Max Müller; Bibliotheca Buddhica (30 volumes in 32 pts); Ramcharitmanas with Hindi and English translations; the Manusmriti in 10 volumes and the Sanskrit lexicon; and the 7 volumes of Encyclopedia of Indian Philosophies. It also brings out books based on research and study conducted at organizations such as the Indian Council of Historical Research (ICHR), Indira Gandhi National Centre for the Arts (IGNCA), and Indian Council for Cultural Relations (ICCR). It has a turnover of approximately ₹ 15 crore, roughly 75% coming from exports.

== History ==
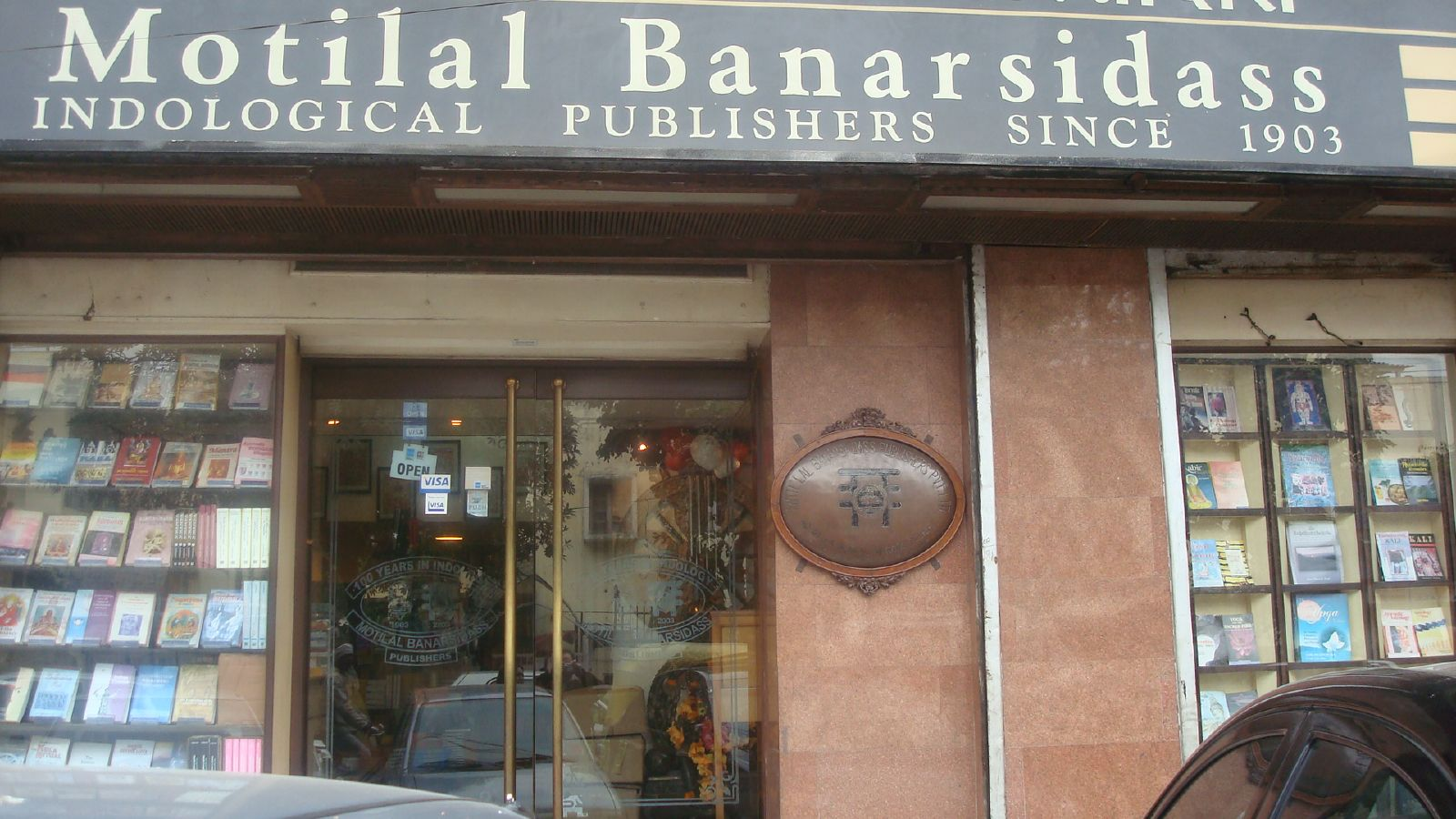
Motilal Banarsidass Shop in North Delhi

Motilal Banarsidass Publishers was first established in Lahore in 1903 by Lala Motilal Jain, a descendant of the family of court jewellers to maharaja Ranjit Singh in Amritsar. Motilal borrowed ₹ 27 from his wife's savings that she had earned from her knitting work, to start a bookshop selling Sanskrit books in 'Said Mitha Bazar' in Lahore. He named it after his eldest son Motilal Banarsidass Jain, who later took charge of the publishing business.

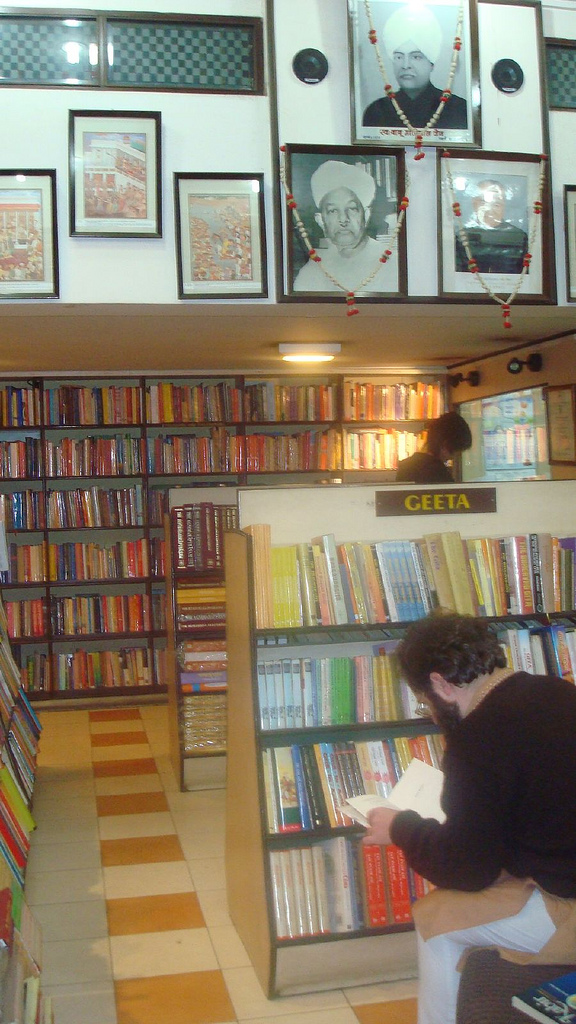
The interior of Motilal Banarsidass, in Delhi

In 1911, MLBD opened a branch at Mai Sewan Bazar, Amritsar, under the supervision of Lala Sundarlal Jain, another son of Lala Motilal Jain, though after the untimely death of Lala Banarasidass in 1912, Sundarlal Jain, his only surviving brother had to close this establishment and relocate to Lahore to look after the family business. Soon he was joined by his young nephew Shantilal Jain, who had just finished school, who eventually became the company's chairman. Soon a printing unit was also set up and the publishing house was established.

In 1937, a branch was started in Patna at the suggestion of Rajendra Prasad. Subsequently, during the Partition of India a riot burnt down the Lahore shop. Post independence, the family moved to India and initially stayed at Bikaner and Patna, before moving to Varanasi in 1950, where it set up shop in 1951, and finally shifted base to Delhi in 1958. Today it is one of the few large publishing houses in the world which has its own in-house printing unit.

In 1992, Shantilal Jain was awarded the Padma Shri by the government of India, the first ever Padma award for outstanding community service through publishing. Today Shantilal's eldest son Narendra Prakash Jain, widely known as 'Prakash' and his four brothers and their sons, along with their mother, Leela Jain, who is the company's Chairperson, run the business.

In 2003, the company celebrated its centenary at a function in Chennai, where Kanchi Sankaracharya, Jayendra Saraswathi, honoured three Sanskrit scholars: R. Balasubramaniam, B.M.K. Sharma and K.V. Sharma. At a function held at Bangalore, Governor of Karnataka, T.N. Chaturvedi, felicitated centenarian Sudhakar Chaturvedi, S.M.S. Chari, and B.K. Krishnamurthy of Hyderabad for their contribution to Indology, and astrologer B.V. Raman was honoured posthumously.

== Main office ==
Its main office in New Delhi is at A-44, Naraina Industrial Area, Phase-1, New Delhi-110028. It houses Indological literature of around 30,000 titles.

== Publications ==
- Sacred Books of the East (50 Volumes) edited by Max Müller (reprints, originally Oxford University Press);
- Indian Kavya Literature by A. K. Warder (10 Volumes, 7 Volumes already published);
- History of Indian Philosophy by S.N. Dasgupta (5 Volumes);
- Aspects of Political Ideas and Institutions in Ancient India by Ram Sharan Sharma (Fifth revised edition, 2005)
- Sudras in Ancient India: A Social History of the Lower Order Down to Circa A D 600 by Ram Sharan Sharma (Third Revised Edition, Delhi, 1990; Reprint, Delhi, 2002)
- Ancient Indian Tradition and Mythology (English translation of the Mahapuranas, 79 Volumes already published);
- Buddhist Tradition Series, edited by Alex Wayman (30 Volumes);
- MLBD Series in Linguistics, edited by Dhanesh Jain (10 Volumes);
- Lala Sundar Lal Jain Research Series edited by Dayanand Bhargava (10 Volumes already published).
- Advaita Tradition Series by Shoun Hino & K.P. Jog (8 Volumes already published);
- Performing Arts Series edited by Farlay P. Richmond (7 Volumes already published).
- Wisdom of Sankara Series by Som Raj Gupta (2 Volumes published);
- Kalamulasastra Series (21 Volumes published).
- Bibliotheca Buddhica (30 Volumes in 32 pts) ed. Sergey Oldenburg, Fyodor Shcherbatskoy, (reprints, originally St. Petersburg)
- Encyclopedia of Indian Philosophies (25 Volumes already published).
- Also many Sanskrit Grammar books by SC Vasu, MR Kale; Dictionaries by MM Williams, Apte.
