= Dhanesh Jain =

Dhanesh Kumar Jain (Hindi: धनेश कुमार जैन, romanized: Dhaneś Kumār Jain; 1939–2019) was the founder of the publishing house Ratna Sagar, an Indologist, and a linguist of Indo-Aryan languages.

Jain was born in Jammu. His family ran a business in button trading. His early education was from Hindu College, Delhi and then Fergusson College. He earned two master's degrees from Delhi University, in Hindi and English. He received his Ph.D. from the University of Pennsylvania in 1973 for his dissertation entitled "Pronominal Usage in Hindi: A Sociolinguistic Study", advised by Dell Hathway Hymes and Franklin Southworth. After teaching Hindi at Penn, in 1973 he returned to India and joined the Linguistics department at Jawaharlal Nehru University.

In 1982, he formed Ratna Sagar, a publishing house for textbooks and teaching materials. Ratna Sagar later oversaw imprints such as Primus and Ratna Books. Jain continued working in linguistics alongside running Ratna Sagar, notably coauthoring The Indo-Aryan Languages with George Cardona, a comprehensive and foundational volume covering the Indo-Aryan language family. He also edited the Motilal Banarsidass Series in Linguistics.

His wife was Kusum Jain, whom he met at Delhi University.
