= Nakoda, Rajasthan =

Nakoda Tirth Mewanagar
- Village
- Shri Jain Shwetambar Nakoda Parshwanath Tirth
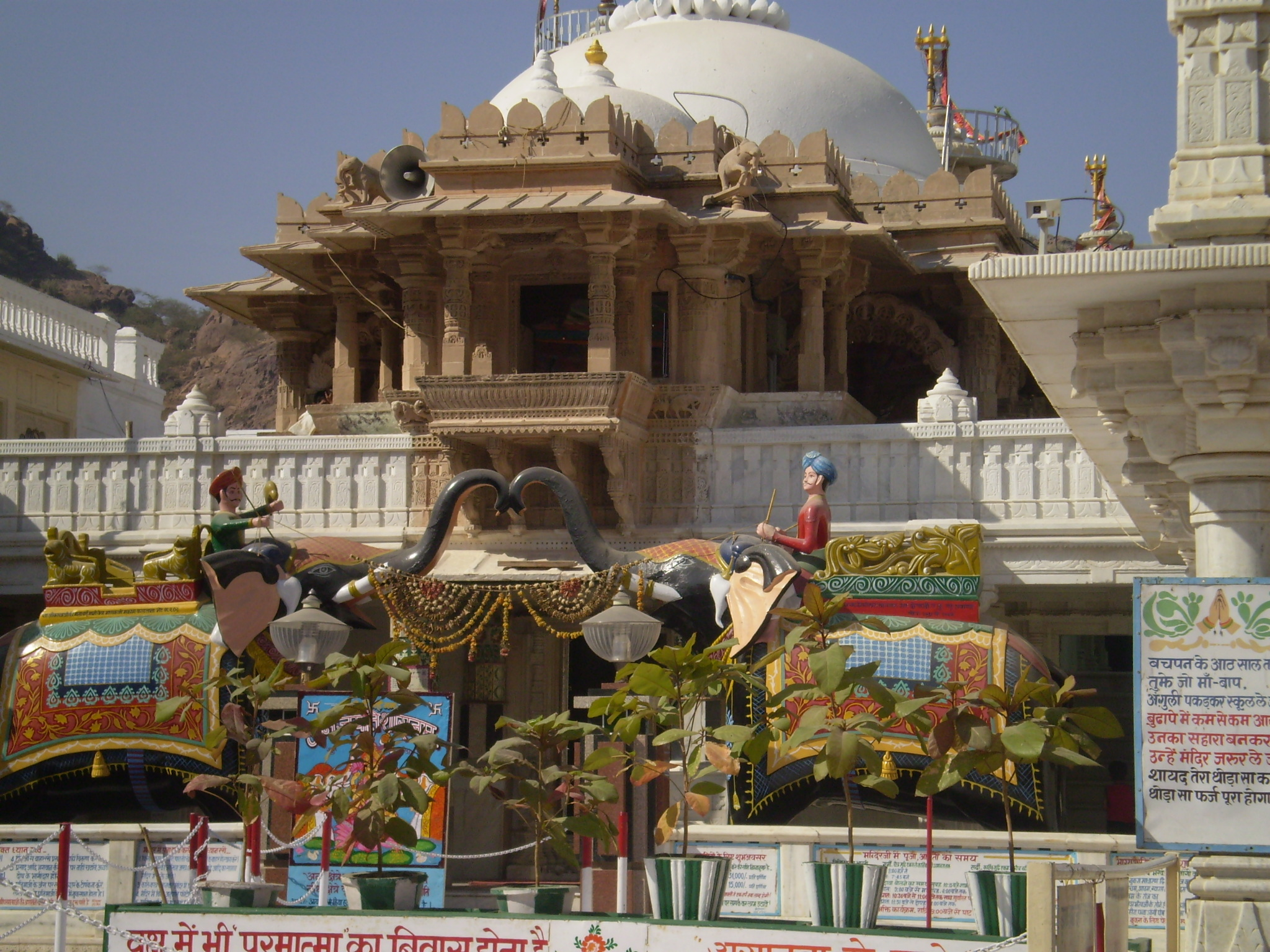
- Shree NakodaJi

- Location in Rajasthan, India Nakoda Tirth (India)
- Coordinates: 25.83°N 72.22°E
- Country: India
- State: Rajasthan
- District: Balotra
- Established: 3rd Century
- Founder: Sthulabhadra

Government
  - Body: Shri Jain Shwetambar Nakoda Parshwanath Tirth Trust

Languages
  - Official: Hindi
- Time zone: UTC+5:30 (IST)
- PIN: 344025
- Telephone code: 912988
- ISO 3166 code: RJ-IN
- Vehicle registration: RJ-39
- Website: nakodatirth.org

Nakoda Mewa Nagar is a village in the Balotra District of the Indian state of Rajasthan. The village name is Mewanagar in the Rajasthan state Government records.

This village was known by the names of Nagara, Viramapura, and Maheva at different times in its history. It gained popularity as Nakoda after the construction of the Nakoda Parshva Jain temple. Nakoda is a holy place of the Jains.

Mulnayak is a nearly 58 cm high black-colored idol of Parshva in the lotus position. Today Nakodaji is worldwide famous for miracles at Nakodaji. There is a famous miracle still seen that in the darbar of Nakoda Jain Temple, all the diyas which are there, bows down to the Jain Sadhus as a respect of their position which is higher than any king in the world.

== Main Temple ==
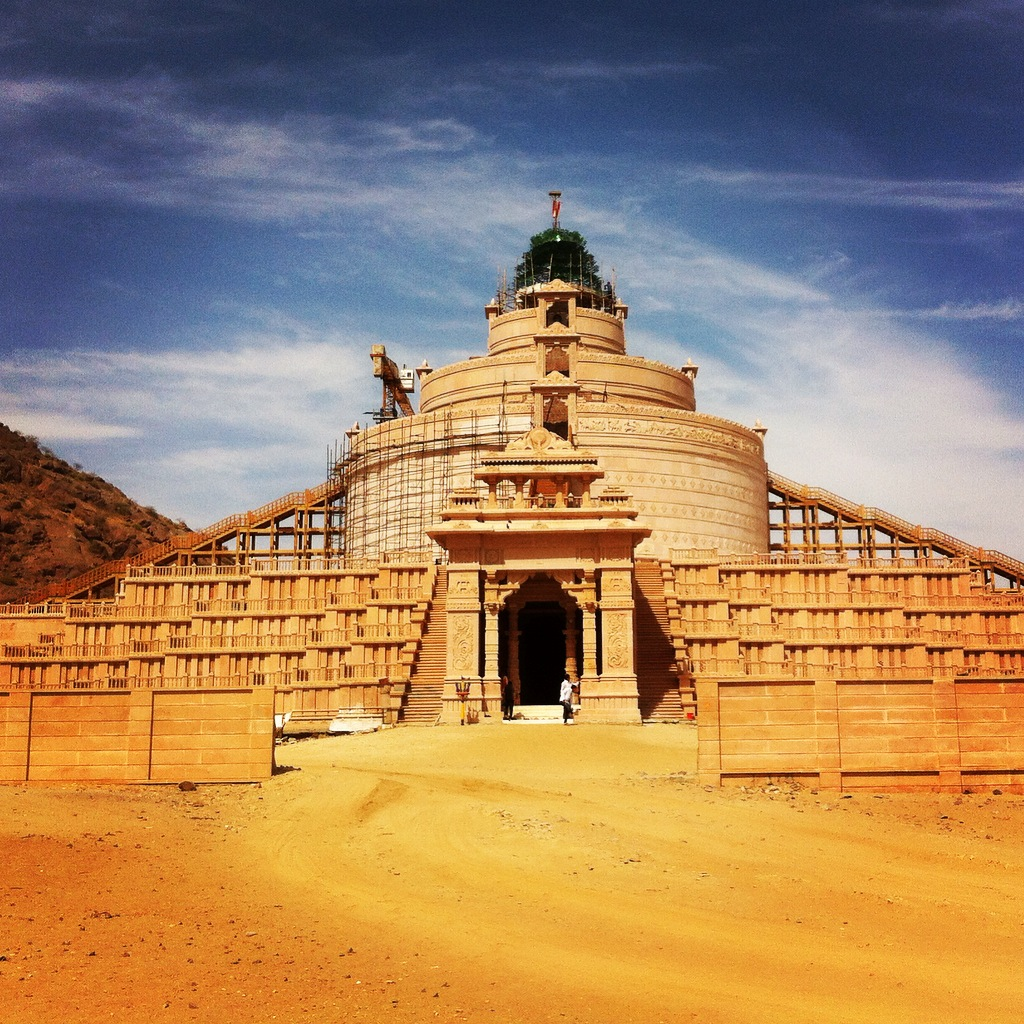
Samosaran temple near Nakoda Parsva Jain temple

Nakoda ji is one of the famous Jain temple of India. This sacred tirtha is at a distance of 13 km from Balotara Railway station and 1 km from Mewad city. It is situated in the forest in the hills. In this tirtha with a charming natural atmosphere all-around, we have an idol of Mulnayaka Shri Parshvanath Bhagavan. It is black in complexion, 58 cm in height and in Padmasana posture. The idol is extremely charming and miraculous. The miracles of the presiding deity of this spot, Shri Bhairavaji Maharaj are well-known. We have a reference which states that the ancient name of Nakoda was Virampur. It is said that in the third century before the Vikrama era, two brothers, Shri Virasen and Shri Nakoresen raised two villages Virampur and Nakorenagar at a distance of twenty miles. They also got constructed two temples of Shri Chandraprabhu Bhagavan and Shri Suparshva Bhagavan.

The main idol is that of Shri Nakoda Parsvanatha. This statue was brought here from the village Nakoda which is near Sinduri, hence the place is called Nakoda Parsvanath temple. But this alone is not the attraction of the temple. The idol of Shri Nakoda Bheruji was installed by Acharya Shri Vijay Himachal Suri who also established idols of other Teerthankars in this temple.

The temple is a historic site that has undergone construction and expansion over several centuries. It serves as a pilgrimage center visited by adherents of various religions, and devotees regard the site of Nakoda as sacred.

Although the temple is very ancient one but from time to time renovations and repairs and additions have been made to the temple. So it is in a very sound position. The temple has about 246 inscriptions which amply show that over the centuries, the temple was extended, renovated, rebuilt and additions were made to it. Even today the construction work is continuing.

== How to reach ==
It is among the hills in the distant forest at a distance of 13 kilometers from Balotra.

By Railway

The nearest railway station near Nakoda is Balotra railways station which is 13 km from the temple. From Balotra there are many train for different parts of India.

Bus service

There are both private and RSRTC for different cities from Nakoda. The bus for Jodhpur, Barmer, Jalore etc. regularly.

Airport

The nearest airport is 110 km far away from Nakoda that is Jodhpur Airport. From Jodhpur airport there are flights for New Delhi, Jaipur, Ahmedabad, Bangalore etc.

By road

The Nakoda can be reach by road also. The nearest town is Balotra which is 12 km from Nakoda temples. The distance of some cities from Nakoda temples is:

- Jodhpur=100 km
- Balotra =12 km
- Barmer=110 km
- Pachpadra=25 km
- Ahmedabad= 400 km
- Jaipur = 452 km
- New Delhi = 709 km
- Mumbai = 923 km
- Indore = 674 km
- Bhopal = 810 km

== See also ==
- List of Jain temples
