= Mewa Nagar =

Village in Rajasthan

- Village
- Location in Rajasthan, India Mewa Nagar (India)
- Coordinates: 25°48′04″N 72°09′11″E
- Country: India
- State: Rajasthan
- District: Balotra district

Government
  - Type: Democratic
  - Body: Tehsil

Population (2011)
  - Total: 4,553

Languages
  - Official: Hindi/Marwadi
- Time zone: UTC+5:30 (IST)
- Nearest city: Jodhpur, Balotra

Mewa Nagar is a village in Pachpadra tehsil of Balotra District, Rajasthan, India.
