= Jainism in Rajasthan =

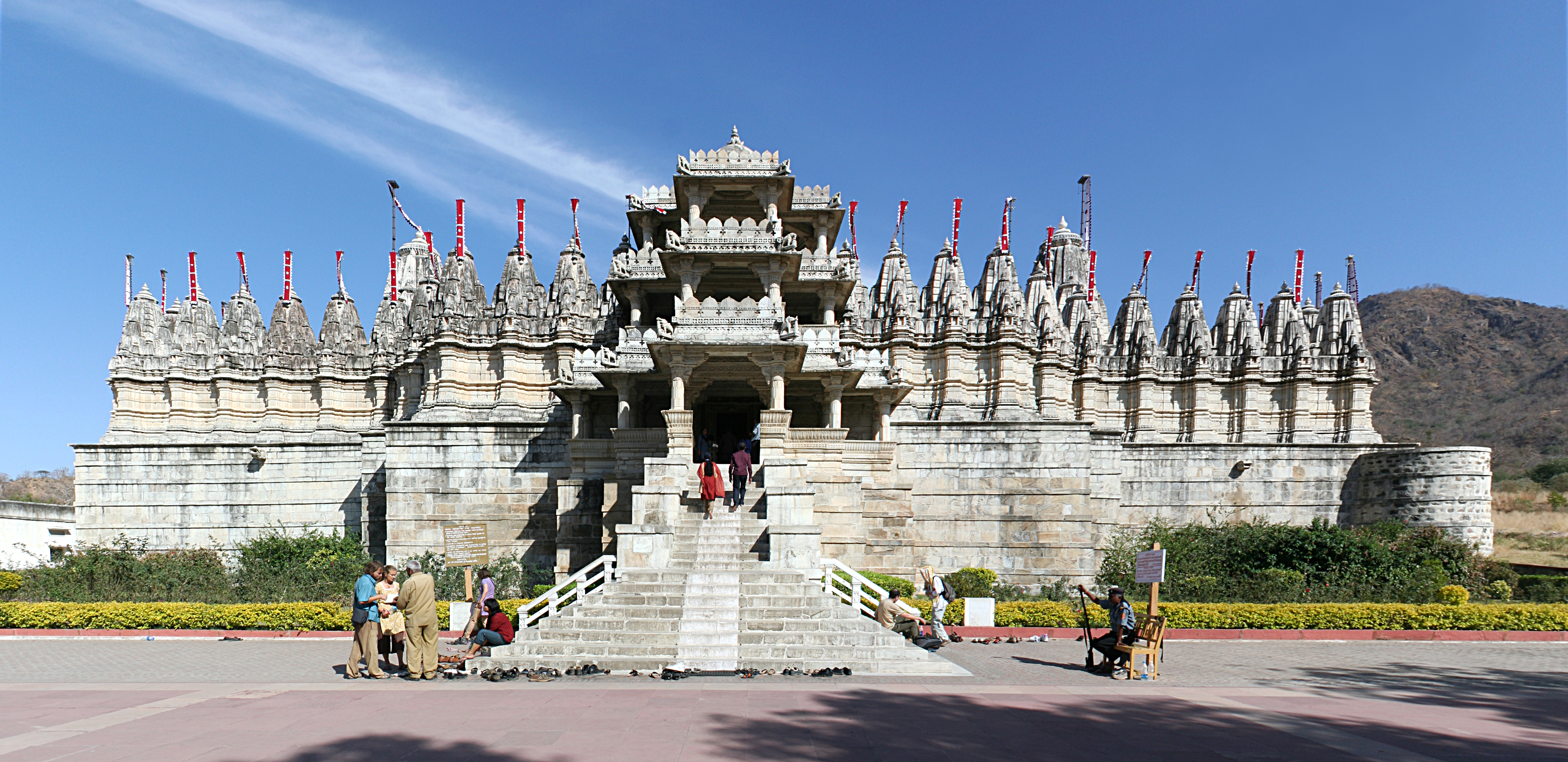
Ranakpur Jain Temple

Rajasthan, a state in western India, has had a close historical connection with Jainism. Southwestern Rajasthan was the main centre for Śvetāmbara Jainism. Major Digambara centres are in the northern and eastern parts of Rajasthan. Central and Northern Rajasthan are the main centres for the Terapanth sect of Śvetāmbara Jainism.

== Major centres ==
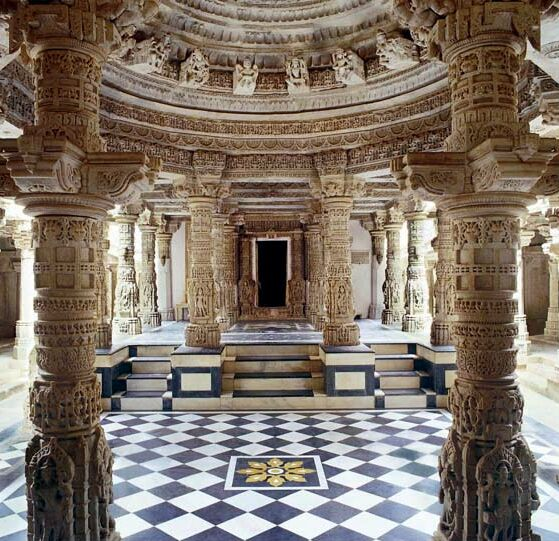
Dilwara Temples

Major ancient Jain centres include:

- Soniji Ki Nasiyan (Ajmer Jain Temple)
- Khandela
- Bhinmal
- Osian, Jodhpur; Mahavira Jain temple, Osian
- Muchhal Mahavir Temple
- Nagaur
- Amer (Jaipur)
- Sanganer
- Kesariyaji Tirth, Rishabhdeo
- Shri Mahaveerji temple
- Padampura
- Lodhurva Jain temple
- Nakodaji
- Dilwara Temples, Mount Abu
- Jirawala
- Ranakpur
- Bijolia
- Nareli Jain Temple
- Pindwara
- Chittorgarh
- Bhandasar Jain Temple
- Chand Khedi
- Shree Pavapuri Tirth Dham
- Jaisalmer Fort Jain temples
- Mungathala
- Chamatkarji
- Ladnu Jain temple
- Mahavira Jain temple, Osian (Jodhpur): Considered the oldest surviving Jain temple in Western India, dating back to 783 AD.
- Nakodaji : A revered holy site known as a tirth (pilgrimage) located in the desert area.
- Mirpur Jain Temple: Often cited as the oldest marble monument in Rajasthan, dedicated to Parshvanatha.
- Shri Mahaveerji temple (Karauli): A major center for Digambara Jains, dating back several centuries.
- Lodhurva Jain temple (Jaisalmer): An ancient site known for its delicate carvings and Parshvanatha idol.
- Soniji Ki Nasiyan (Ajmer): A 19th-century Digambara temple famous for its "Gold City" (Swarna Nagari) hall.

== Photo gallery ==
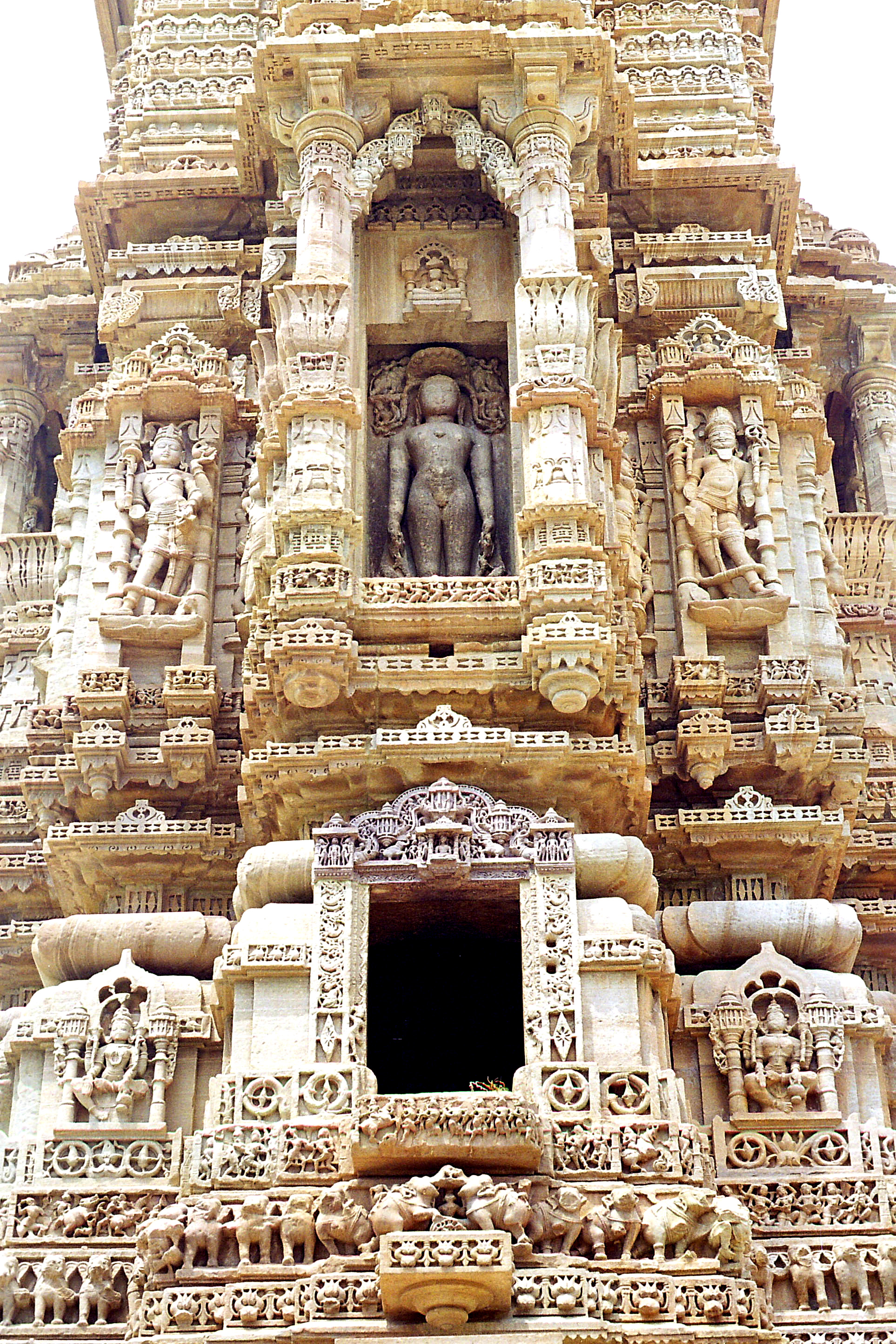
Architectural details of Kirti Stambha

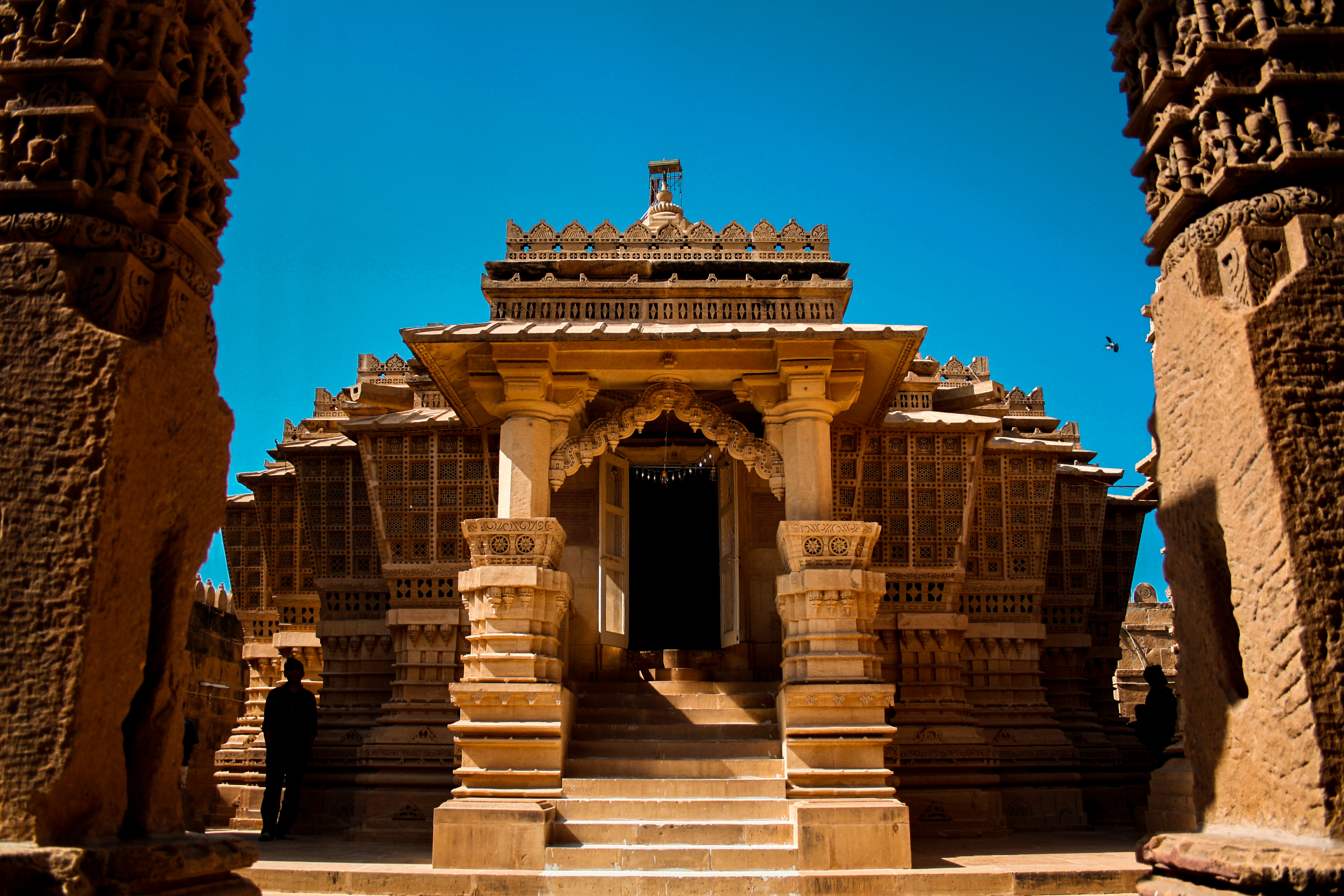
Lodhurva Jain temple

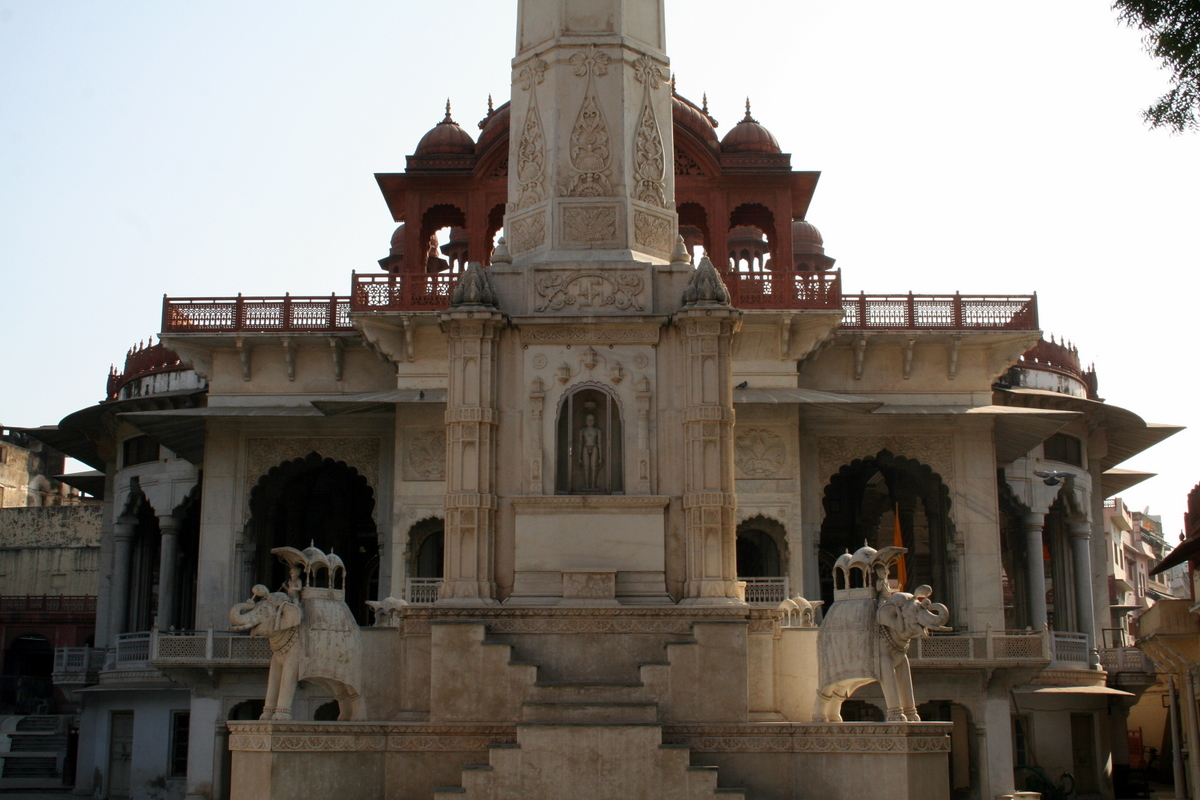
Soniji Ki Nasiyan

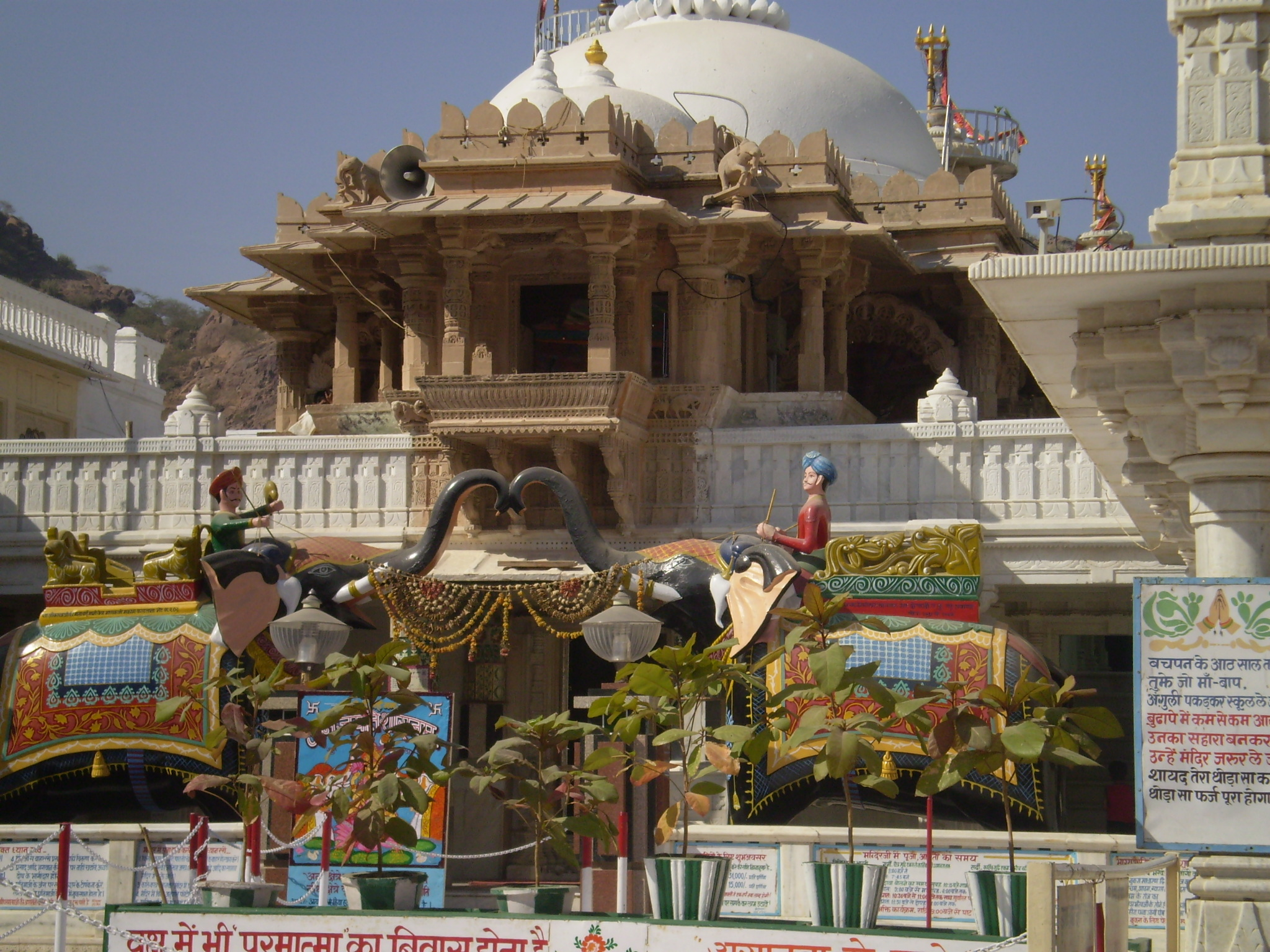
Nakoda Tirth

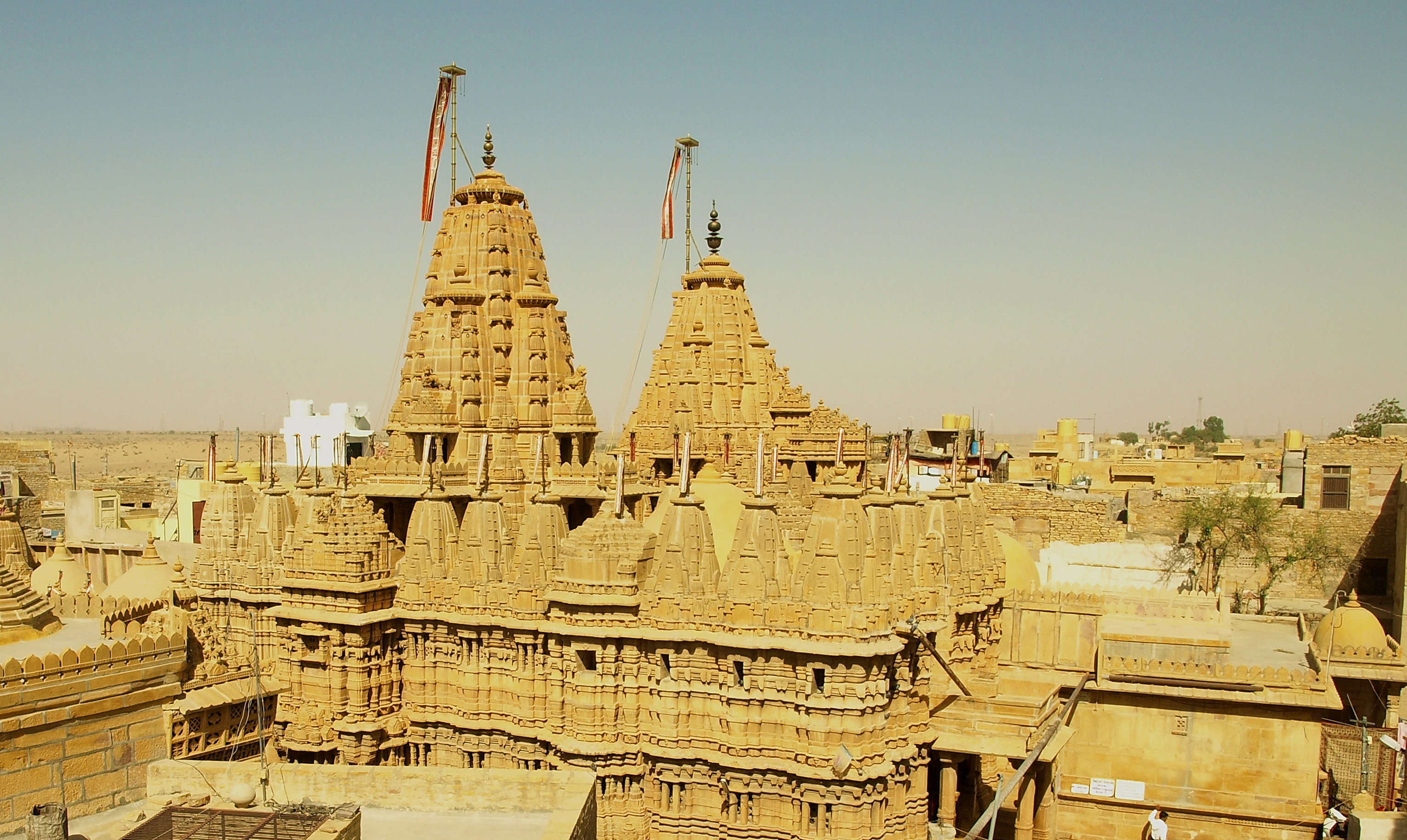
Parshavantha temple, Jaisalmer Fort

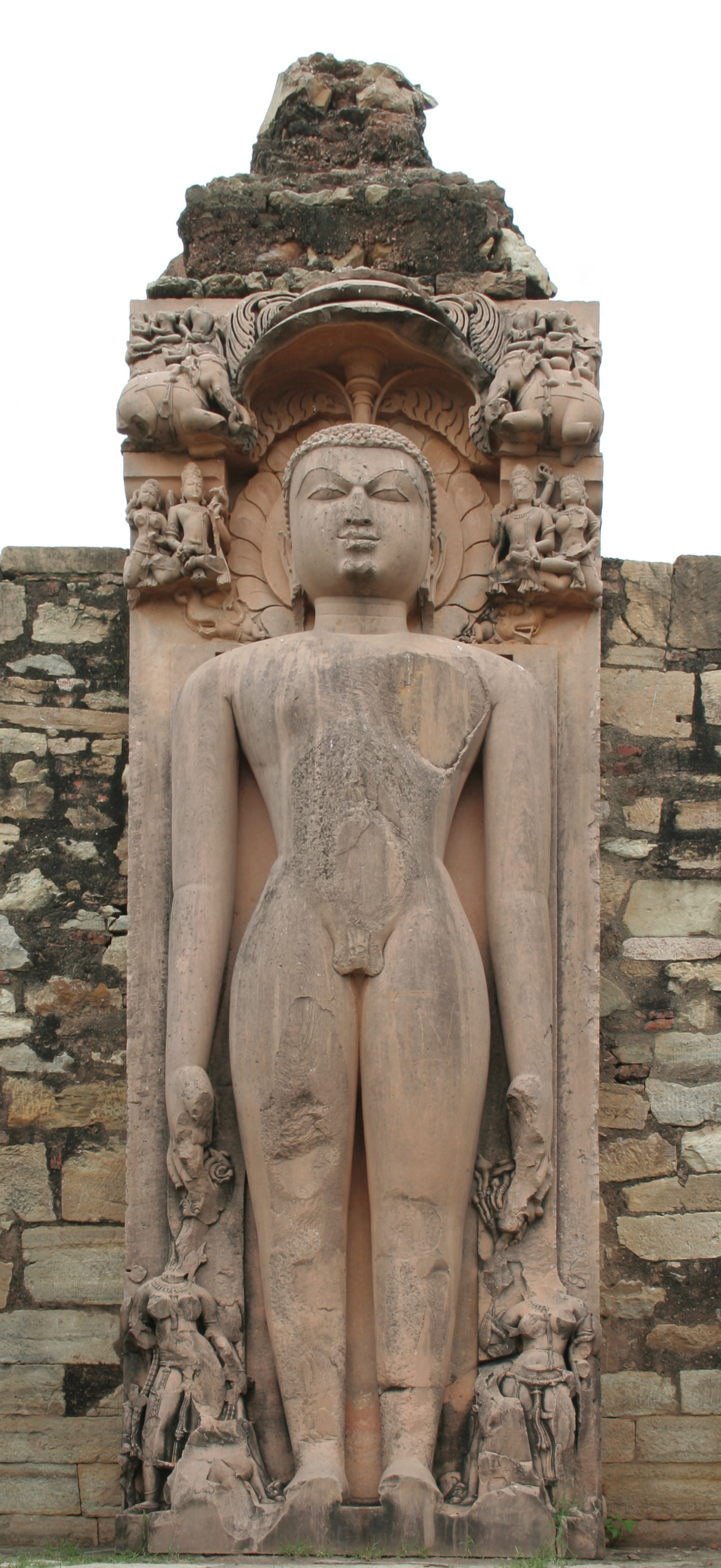
Jain statue, Neelkanth temple, Alwar district

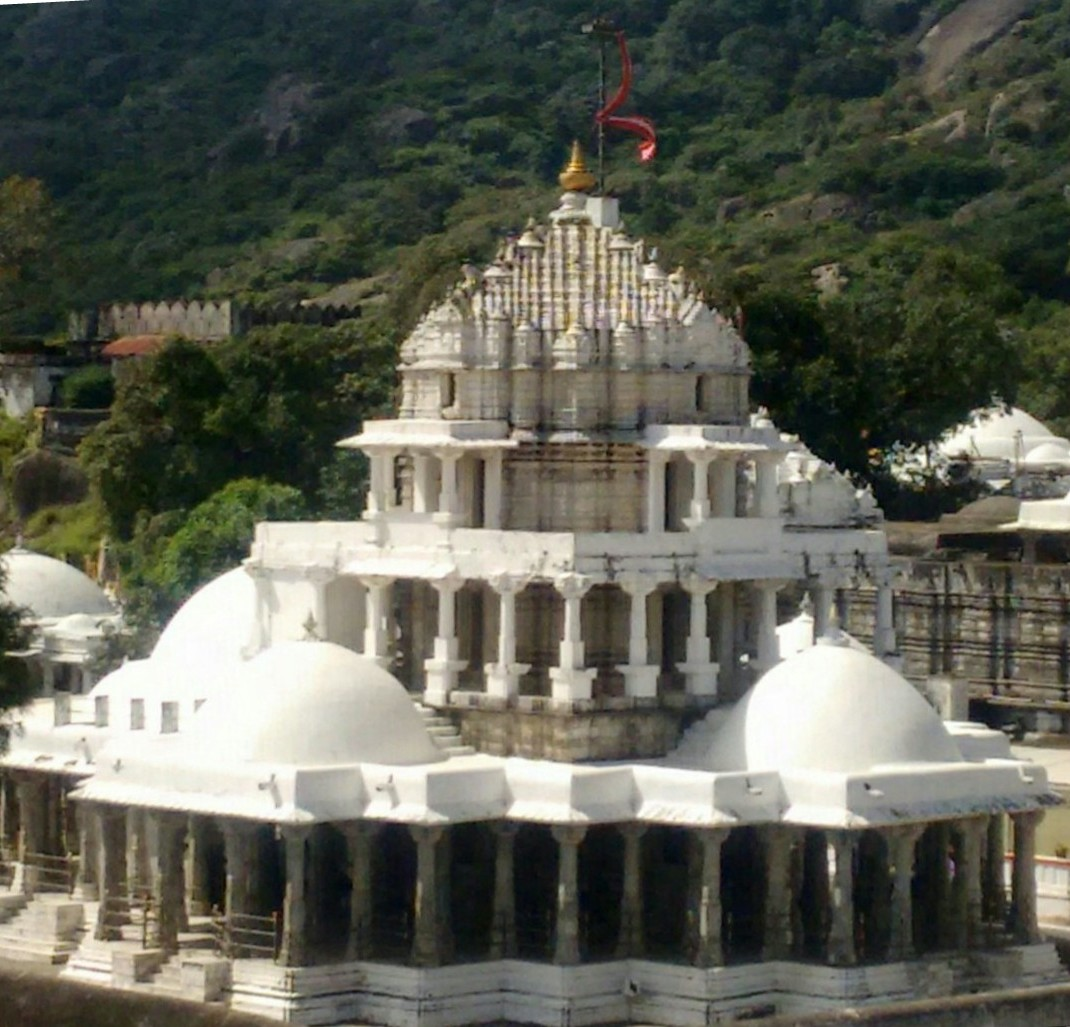
Parshvanatha Temple, Dilwara Temples

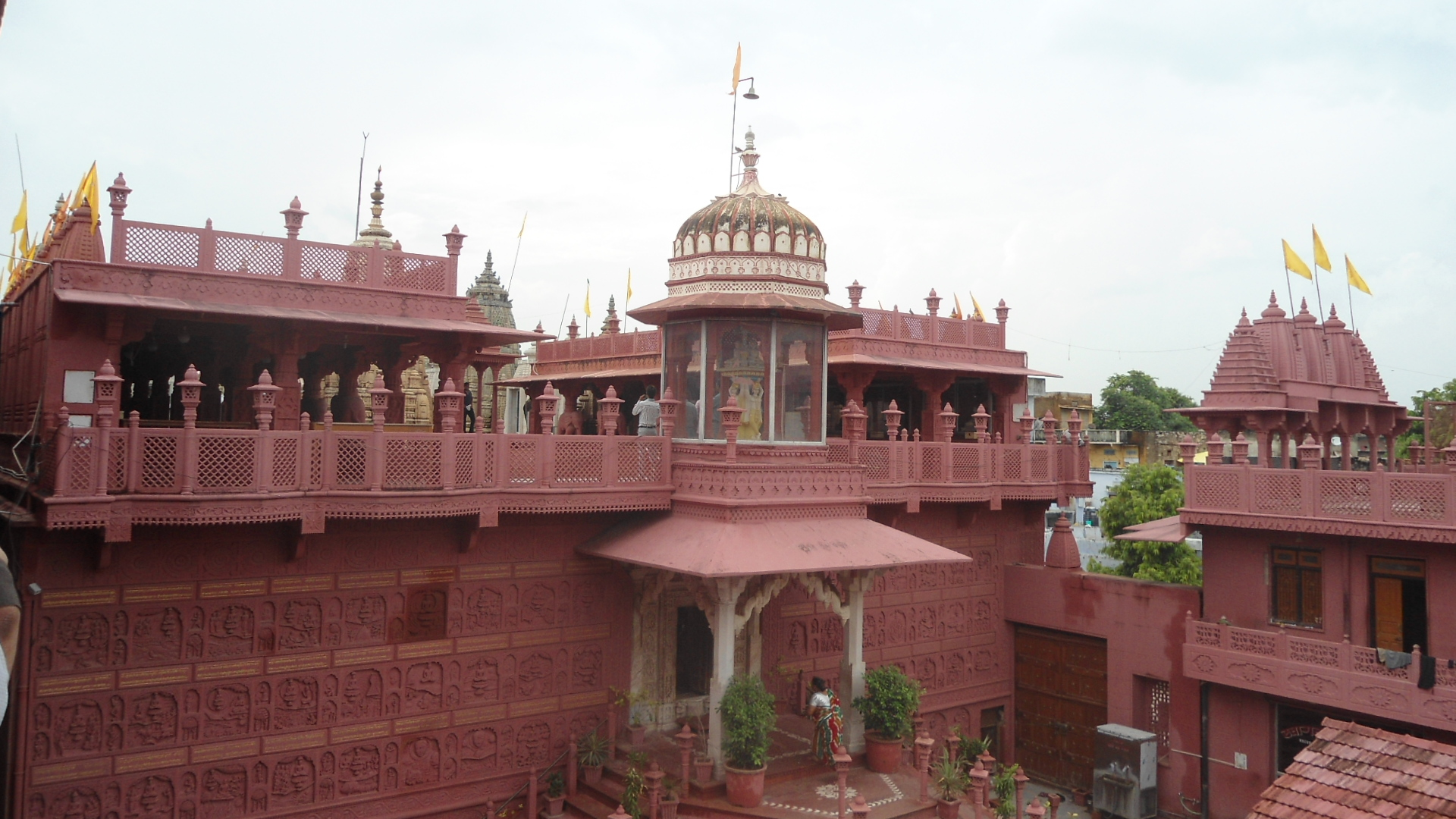
Shri Digamber Jain Atishya Kshetra Mandir, Sanghiji, 4000 years old temple

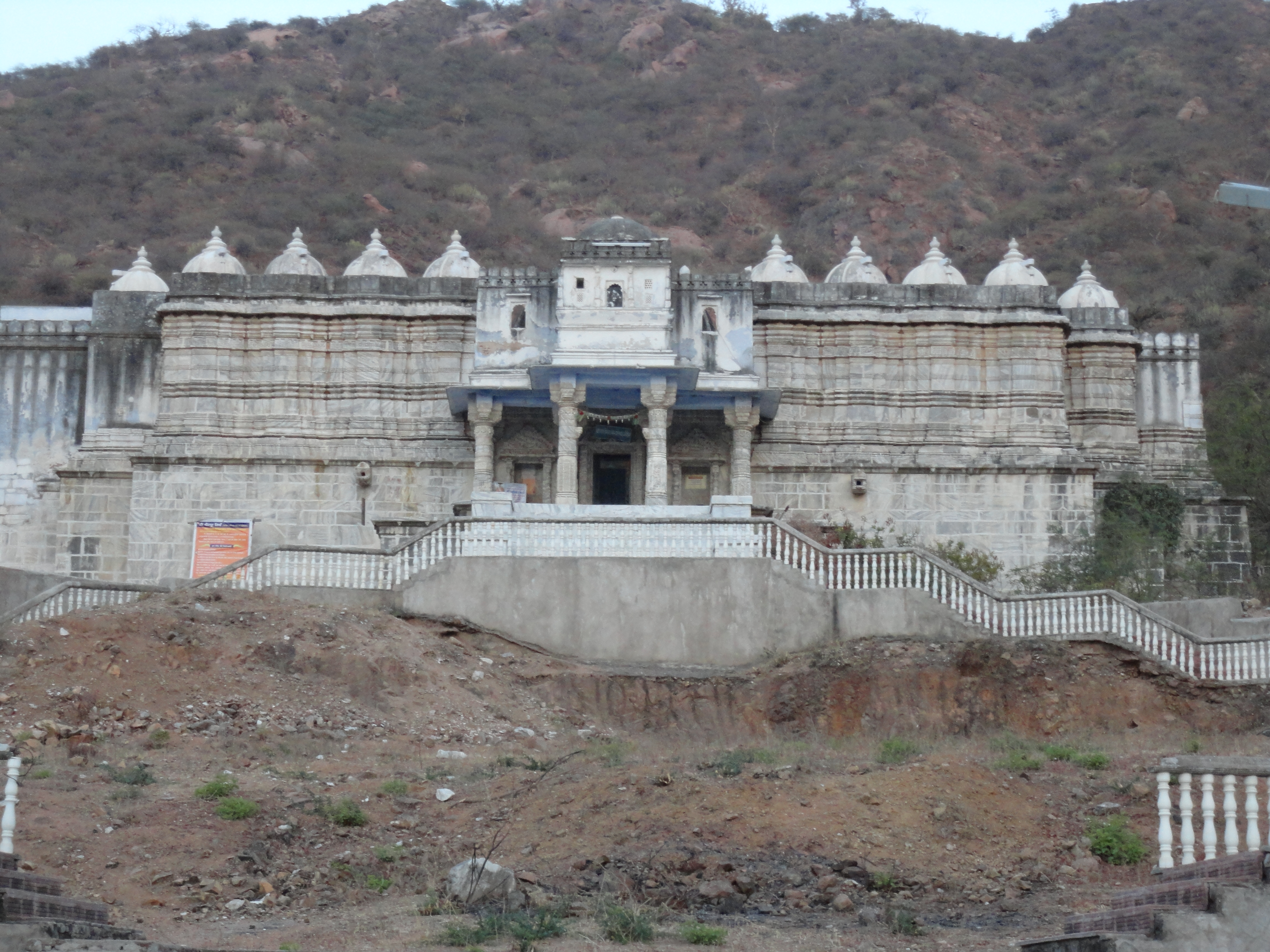
Mirpur Jain Temple

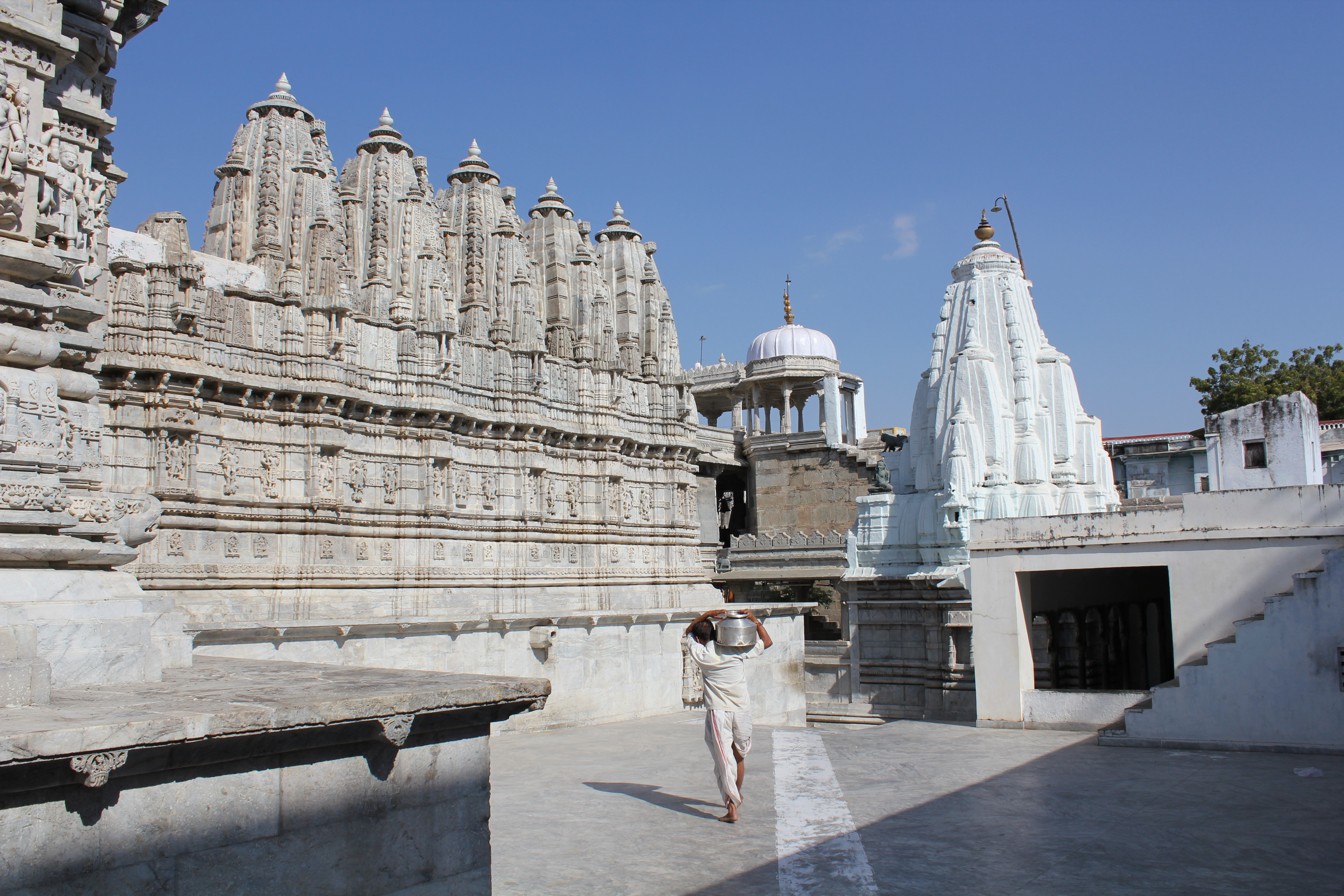
Rishabhdeo

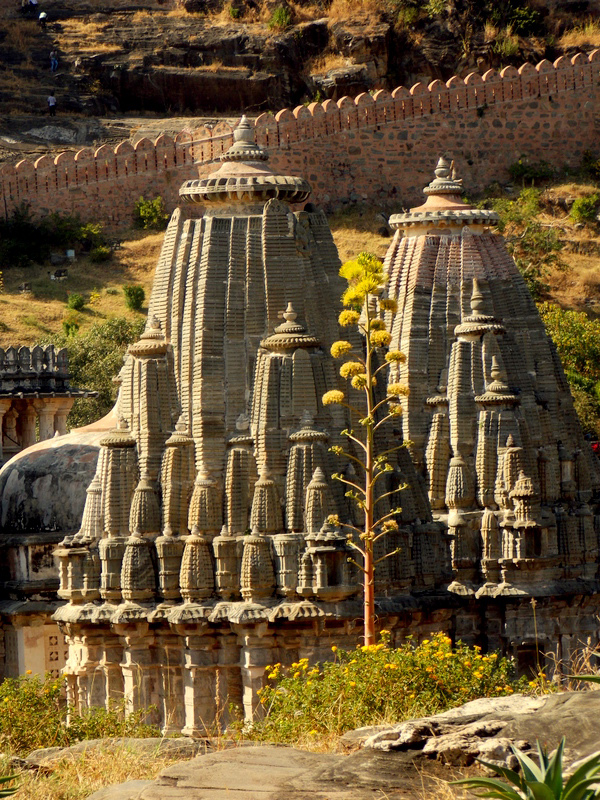
Jain temple, Kumbhalgarh Fort

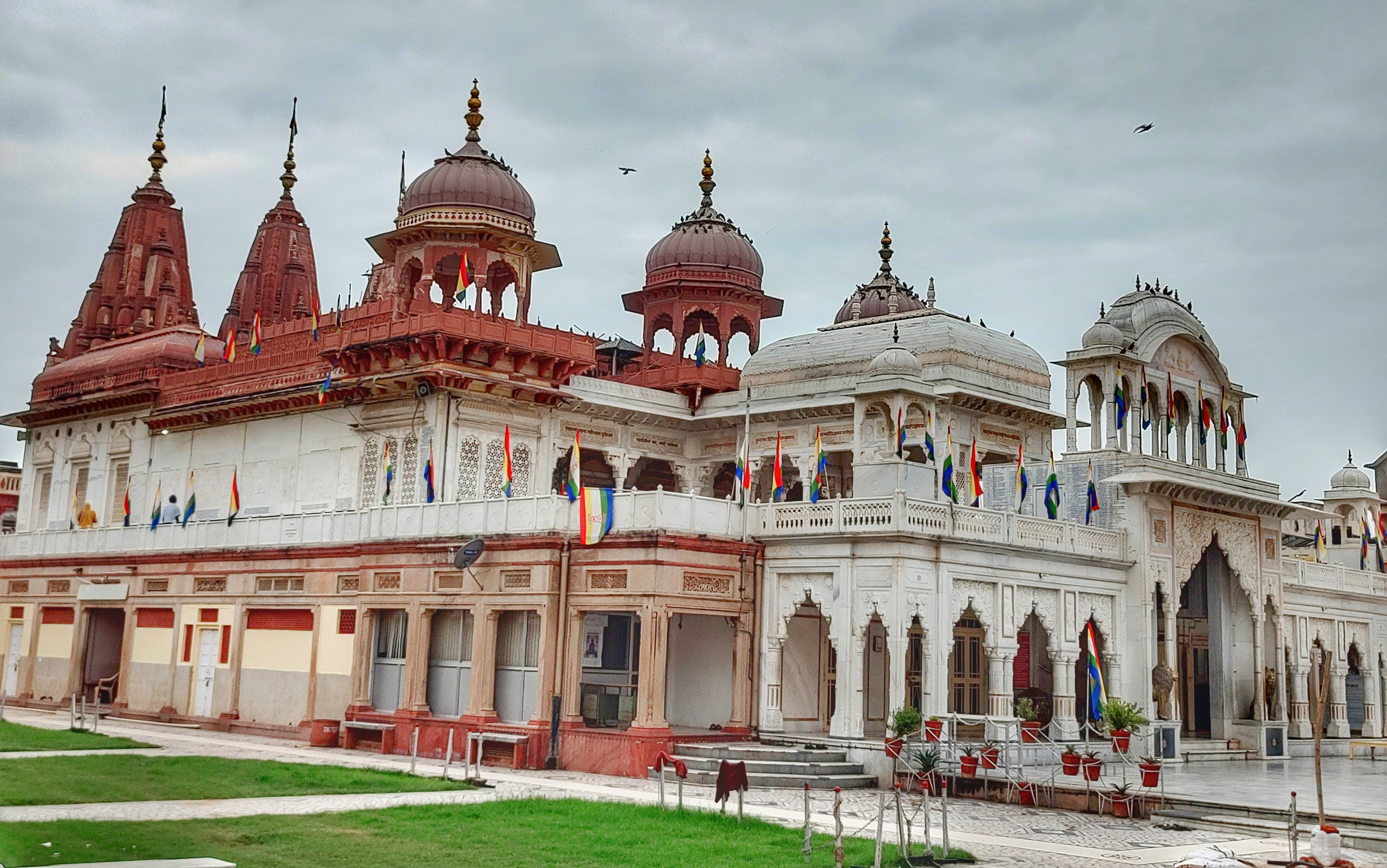
Shri Mahavirji

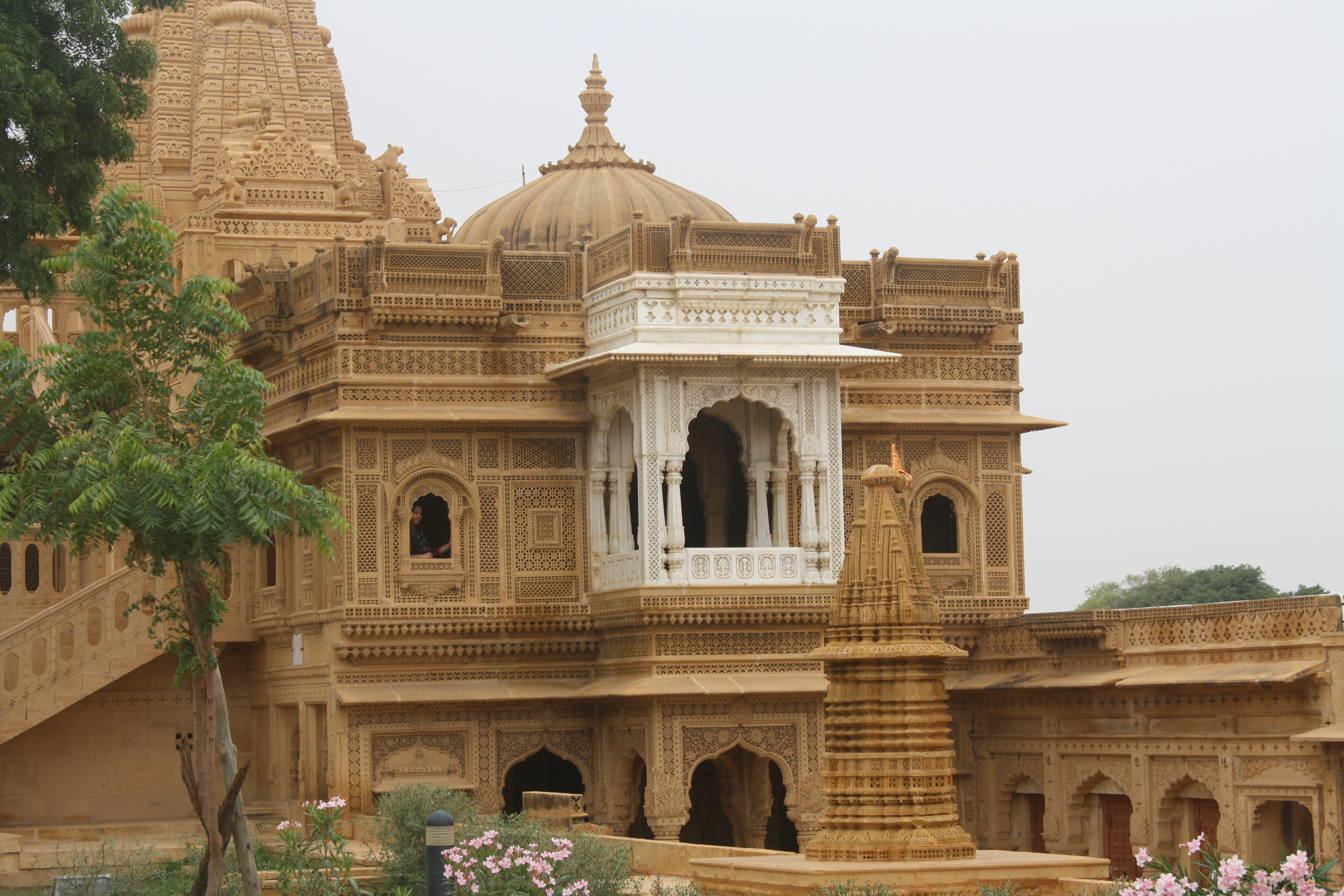
Amar Sagar Jain temple

== See also ==
- Tijara Jain Temple
- Shri Mahavirji Jain Temple

== Sources ==
- Dr. Jagdish Chandra Jain, History of Towns of Rajasthan
