= Chand Khedi, Kota =

Village in Rajasthan, India

Chand Khedi
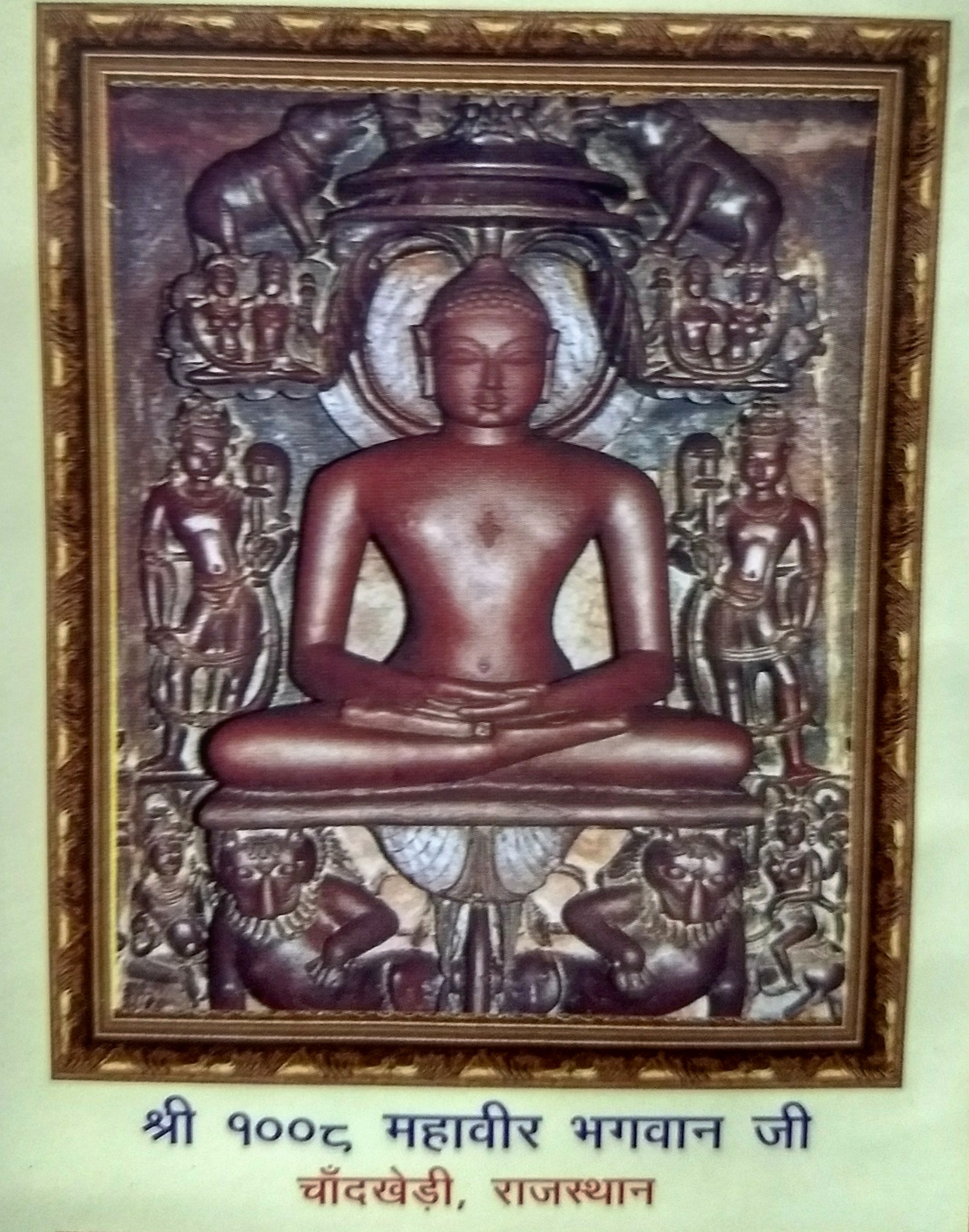
- Mahavir Swami idol at Chand Khedi

Religion
- Affiliation: Jainism
- Sect: Digambara
- Deity: Adinath Swami
- Festivals: Mahamastakabhisheka, Mahavir Jayanti

Location
- Location: Kota, Rajasthan, India
- Interactive map of Chand Khedi
- Coordinates: 23.8691°N 75.5945°E

Architecture
- Creator: Bhattarka Jagatkirti
- Established: 1676
- Temple: 1

Chand Khedi is a small village near Kota, Rajasthan where a very old temple of Rishabhdev is situated. This temple was often invaded by Aurangzeb, one of the Mughal rulers, but he was unable to destroy the temple.

== Location ==
Chand Khedi is located at 55 kilometres (34 mi) from Atru railway station on Kota-Guna line of the Western Railway.

== Legends ==
Chand Khedi figures prominently in two Jain legends. It is a place of miracles. All wishes made by the disciples are fulfilled by the Lord.

In the first of these legends, dating back to the time of the Mughal invasions, a blow from an invader's axe damaged the toe of the Rishabhdev temple idol, resulting in a flow of milk which swept away the invaders and kept the temple safe.

A more recent legend dates to 2002, when a Jain saint named Sudhasagar unearthed three carved crystal images of Jain Tirthankaras in a nearby cave. Sudhasagar was advised in a dream about the location of the images, and the images are significantly older than the 1200 year age of the village itself.

== About temple ==
Chandkhedi is one of the most important Jain pilgrimage in Rajasthan and is considered an architectural marvel. The mulnayak of the temple is a 6 feet (1.8 m) idol of Rishabhanatha in padmasan posture.
