= Lodhurva Jain temple =

Śvetāmbara Jain temple in Rajasthan, India

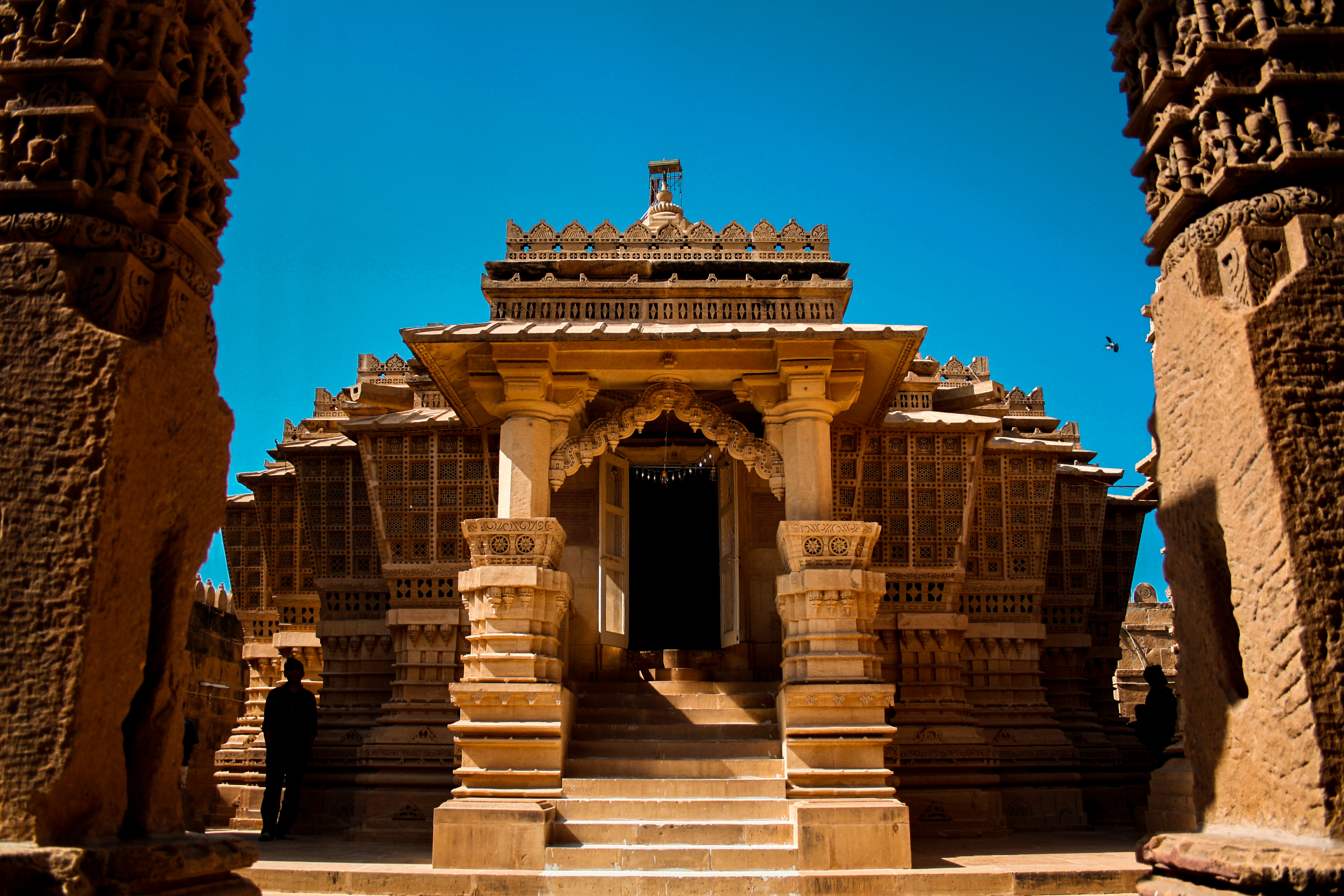
- Parshvanath temple, Lodhurva

- Location within Rajasthan

Religion
- Affiliation: Jainism
- Sect: Śvētāmbara
- Deity: Parshvanath
- Festival: Mahavir Jayanti
- Governing body: Sri Jaisalmer Lodravpur Parshwanath Jain Shwetamber Trust

Location
- Location: Lodhruva, Jaisalmer, Rajasthan
- Coordinates: 26°59′7.3″N 70°48′9.5″E

Architecture
- Style: Māru-Gurjara architecture
- Established: 9th century CE
- Temple: 2

Lodhurva Jain temple is a Jain temple in the Lodhruva village of Jaisalmer district in Rajasthan. It belongs to the Śvetāmbara sect of Jainism The temple is constructed principally from the characteristic yellow Jaisalmer limestone and is notable for its eight-cornered form, sloping walls, geometrical stone latticework and carved architectural panels.

== History ==
Lodhruva was established as the capital by Rawal Deoraj, the Bhati clan, in 8th−9th century CE. The temple was constructed in the 9th century along with city of Lodhruva. Rawal Jaisal, a famous prince of the Bhati clan, moved his capital from Lodhruva to Jaisalmer in 1156 CE. The temple was also plundered by Mahmud of Ghazni and Muhammad of Ghor. This led to temple being destroyed in 1152 CE. In 1615 CE, the temples undergone repairs and renovations. The temple remains the only standing structure in the ruined city of Lodhruva.

The surviving temple has continued to undergo restoration. The structure was reconstructed in the late 1970s, with further restoration undertaken in the early 21st century.

== Architecture ==
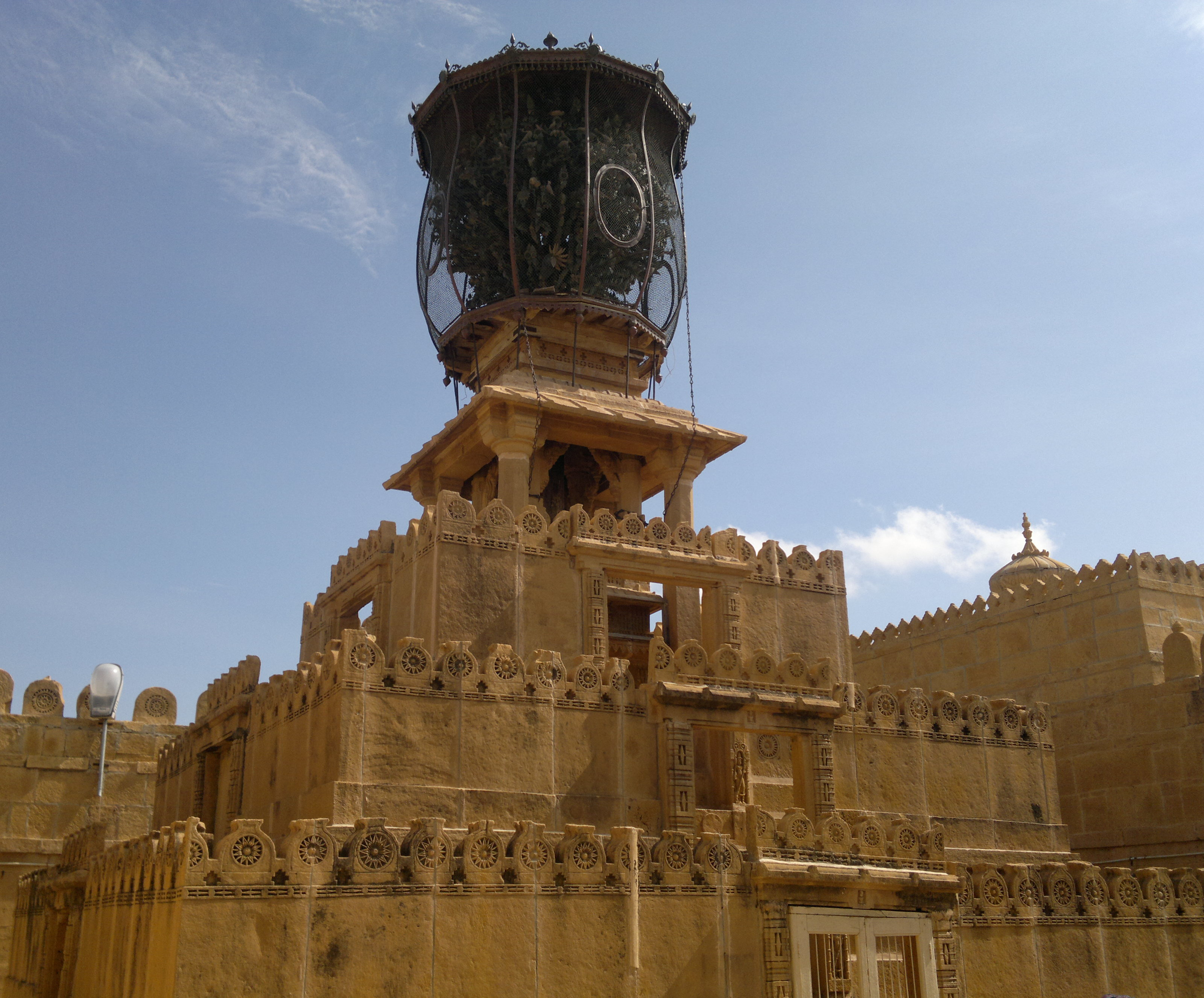
Kalpavriksha depiction

The temple is built with yellow limestone and sandstone; famous for the intricate craftsmanship. The temple features ornate torana (arched gateway), and stone carvings of Kalpavriksha and kalputra. Lodhurva Jain temple is considered one of the best examples of Jain architecture in Rajasthan. The temple walls are folded similar to an accordion and features exquisite screen carvings of jali.

Lodhurva temple follows structure of typical eight-cornered temple in Jaisalmer region. Its walls slope inward, giving the exterior an appearance resembling a pagoda. The exterior is characterised by geometrical stone latticework, while carved decoration is concentrated on the architectural panels and entrance gateway. The temple also contains an intricately carved ceiling executed in the same yellow limestone.

== About temple ==
Lodhurva is one of the important Jain center. The mulnayak (main deity) of the temple is a black marble idol of Parshvanatha with a canopy of thousand hoods over head. In Shvetambara tradition, idols tend to derive their name from a geographical region, the lodhurva Parshvanath is one of 108 prominent idols of Parshvanath idols. The principal Parshvanatha shrine is accompanied by a temple dedicated to Sambhavanatha, the third Tirthankara.

According to Jain belief, a snake comes out every evening from a hole inside the temple to drink the milk offering. As per popular belief, the sight of this snake is a blessing and considered holy. There is a ritual for people to visit the shrine after marriage.

== Fair ==
A fair is organised here in the month of Pausha, the event draws a huge number of devotees.

== Gallery ==
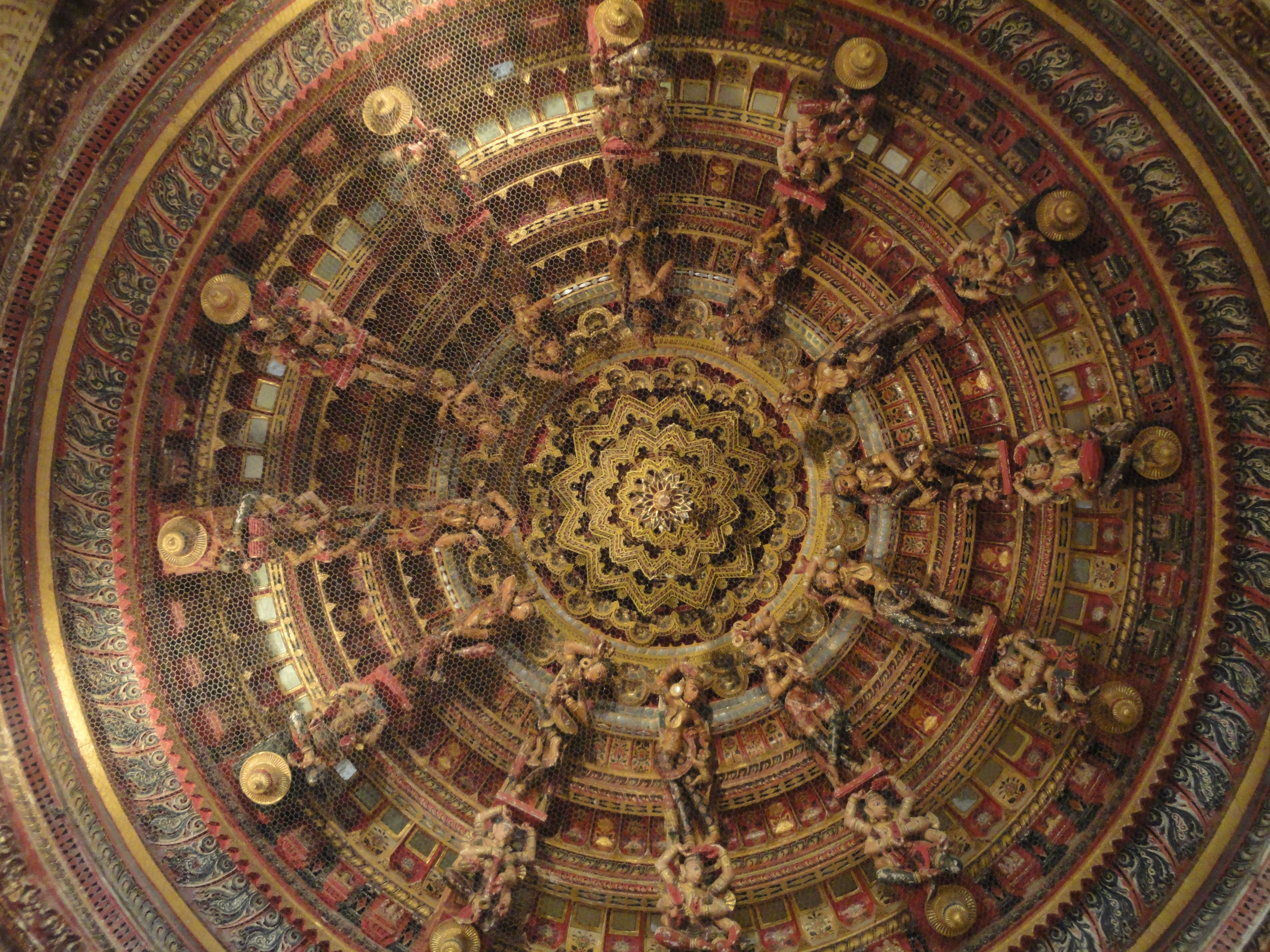
Ceiling with carvings of devkulikas

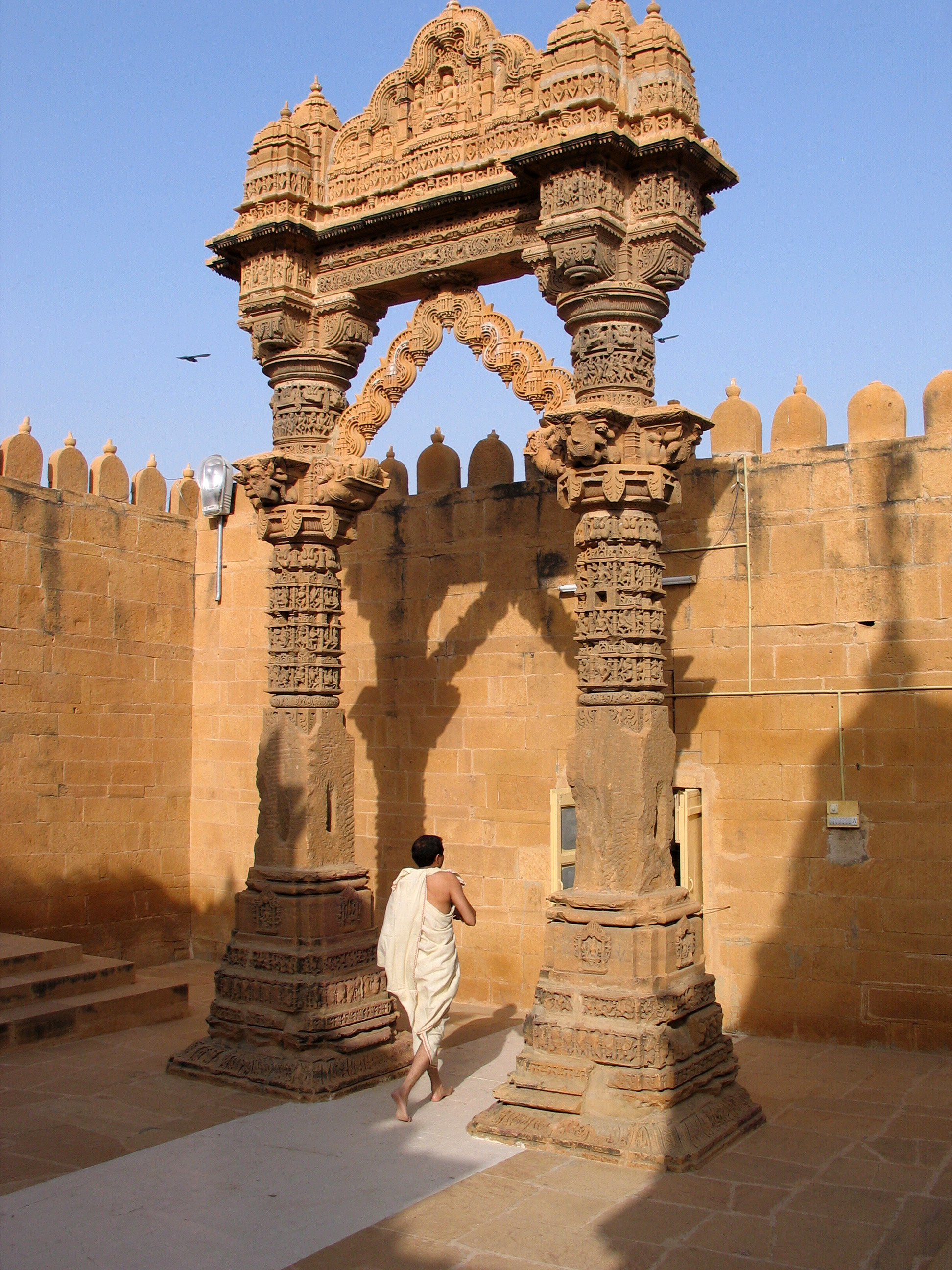
Ornate torana

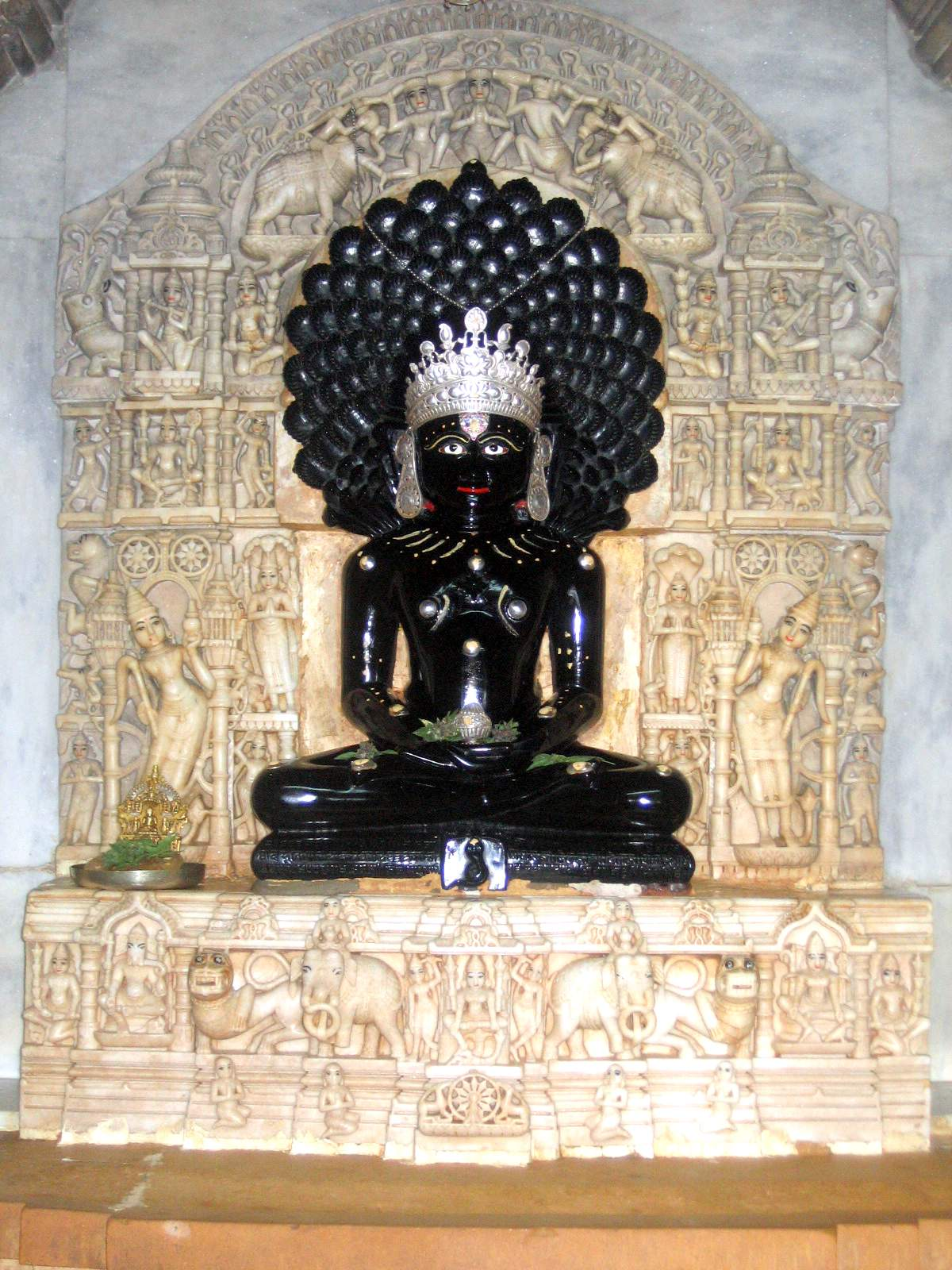
Parshvanath idol

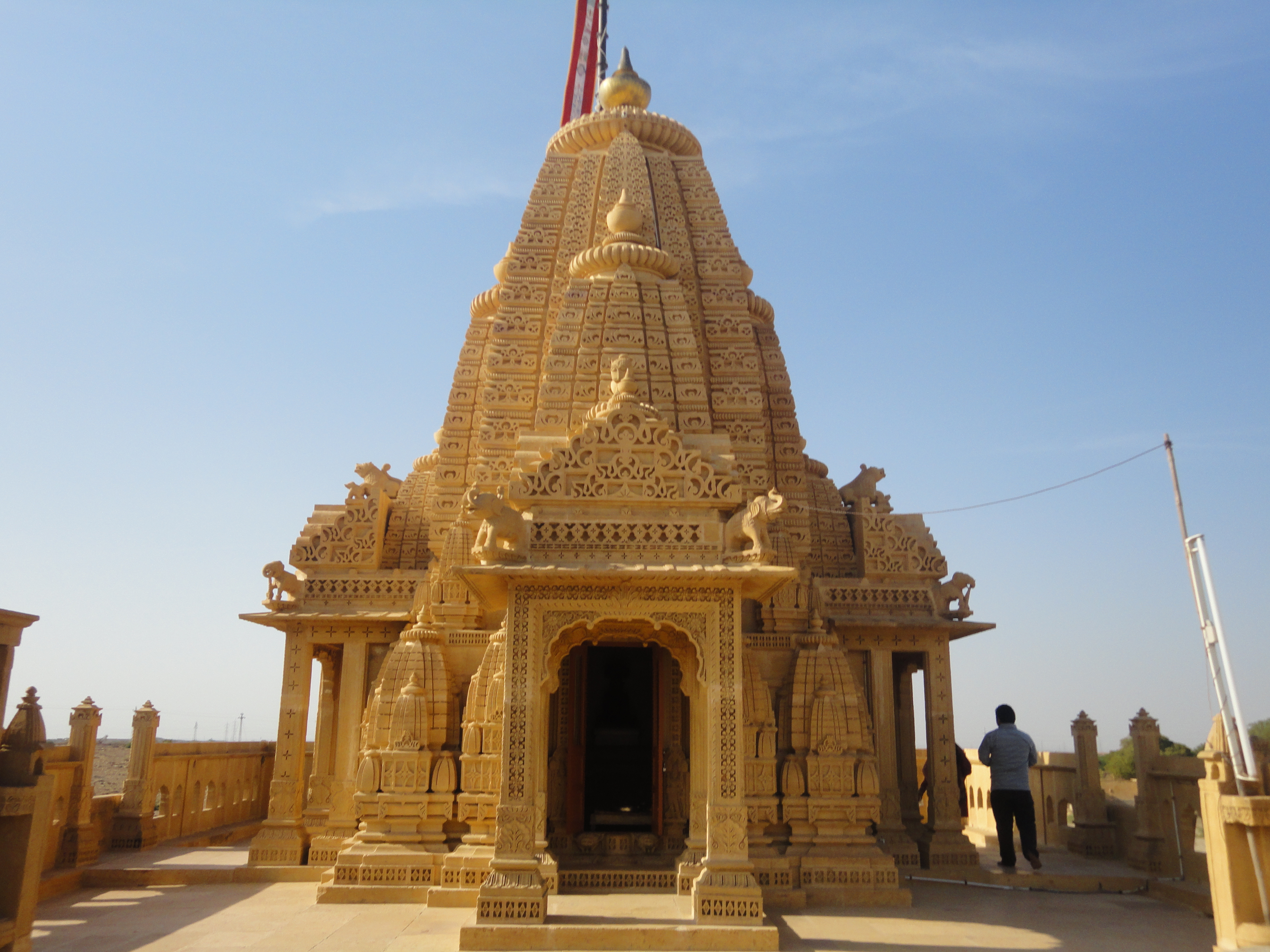
Sambhavanatha temple inside the temple complex

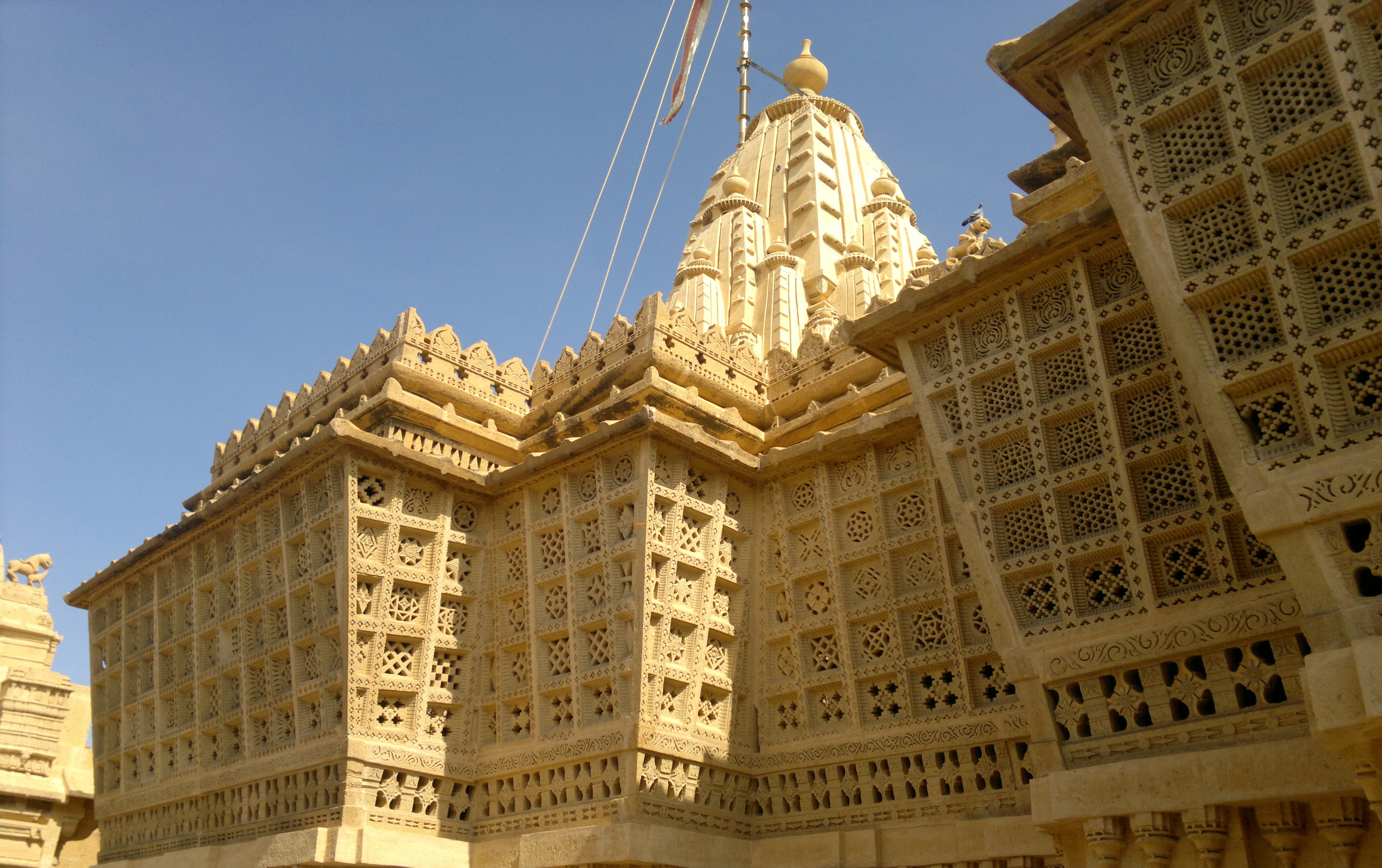
Unique facade designs of Lodurva temple

== See also ==
- Jaisalmer Fort
- Jaisalmer Fort Jain temples
- Amar Sagar Jain temple
