= Jaisalmer Fort Jain temples =

Complex of Śvetāmbara Jain temples in Rajasthan, India

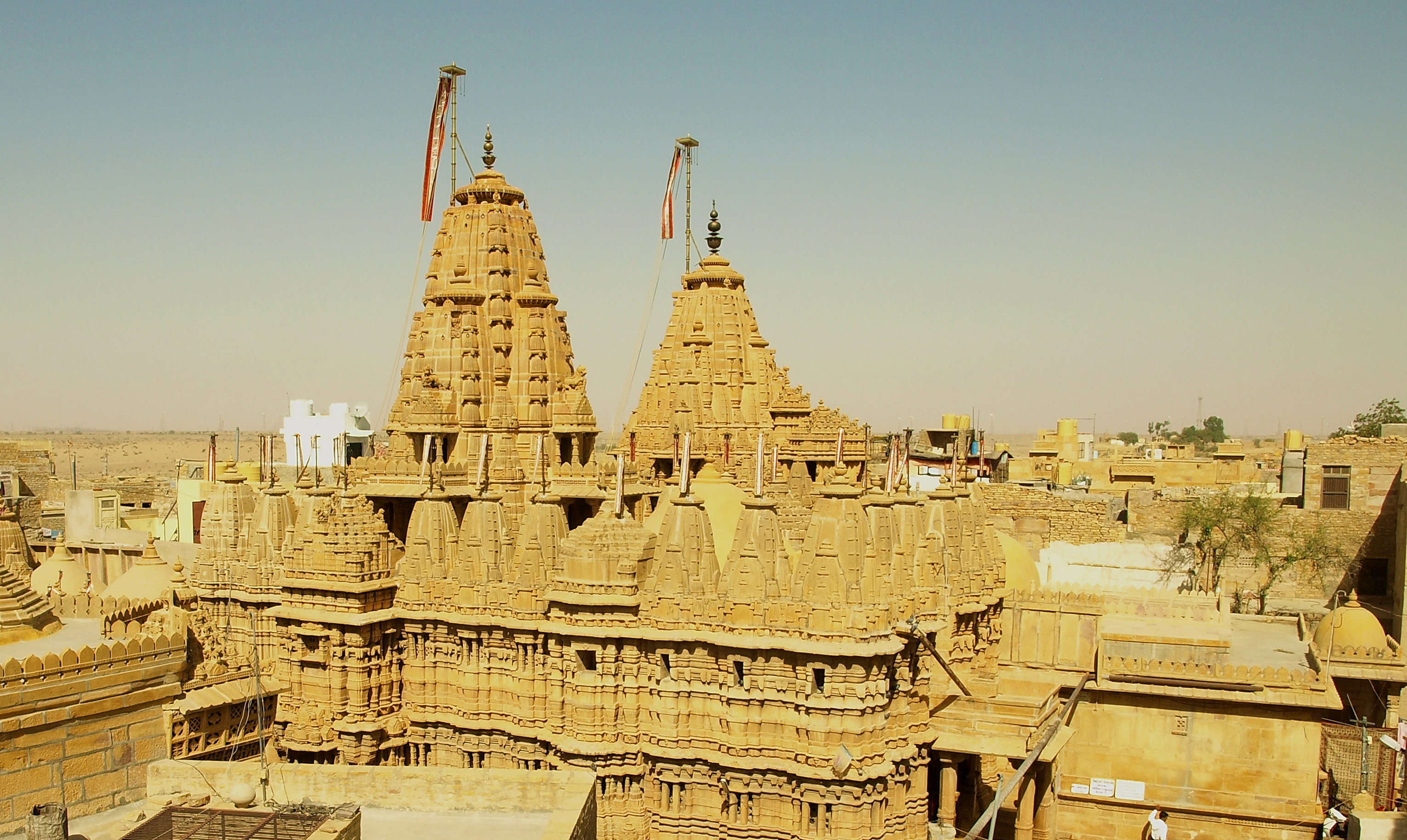
- Parshvanath temple

Religion
- Affiliation: Jainism
- Sect: Śvētāmbara
- Deity: Parshvanatha, Chandraprabha, Rishabhanatha, Sambhavanatha, Shitalanatha, Shantinath and Kunthunatha
- Festival: Mahavir Jayanti

Location
- Location: Jaisalmer, Rajasthan
- Interactive map of Jaisalmer Fort Jain temples
- Coordinates: 26°54′44″N 70°54′44″E

Architecture
- Style: Māru-Gurjara architecture
- Established: 12th century CE
- Completed: 16th century CE
- Temple: 7
- UNESCO World Heritage Site
- Official name: Hill Forts of Rajasthan
- Criteria: Cultural: (ii)(iii)
- Designated: 2013 (session)
- Reference no.: 247rev

Jaisalmer Fort Jain temples is a group of seven Śvetāmbara Jain temples inside Jaisalmer Fort in the Indian state of Rajasthan. It is a World Heritage Site of UNESCO as part of Hill Forts of Rajasthan.

== History ==
Jaisalmer Fort has a complex of seven Jain temples built by yellow sandstone during 12-16th century. Chandraprabha temple was built in 1509 CE. Askaran Chopra of Merta built a huge temple dedicated to Sambhavanatha housing more than 600 idols and Gyan Bhandar (grand library) with oldest hand written books scripted on Bhojpatra and Tadputra. There are about 1,000 old manuscripts written on palm leaf with painted wooden covers. These manuscripts dates back to 12th century. The library also contains paintings, astrological charts, and a copy of dronacharya's Oghaniryaktivritti. Chopra Panchaji built Ashtapadh temple inside the fort.

Sambhavanatha temple and Parshvanath temple houses inscription dated 1440 CE and 1416 CE installed during the reign of Rawal Dūdā.

== Architecture ==
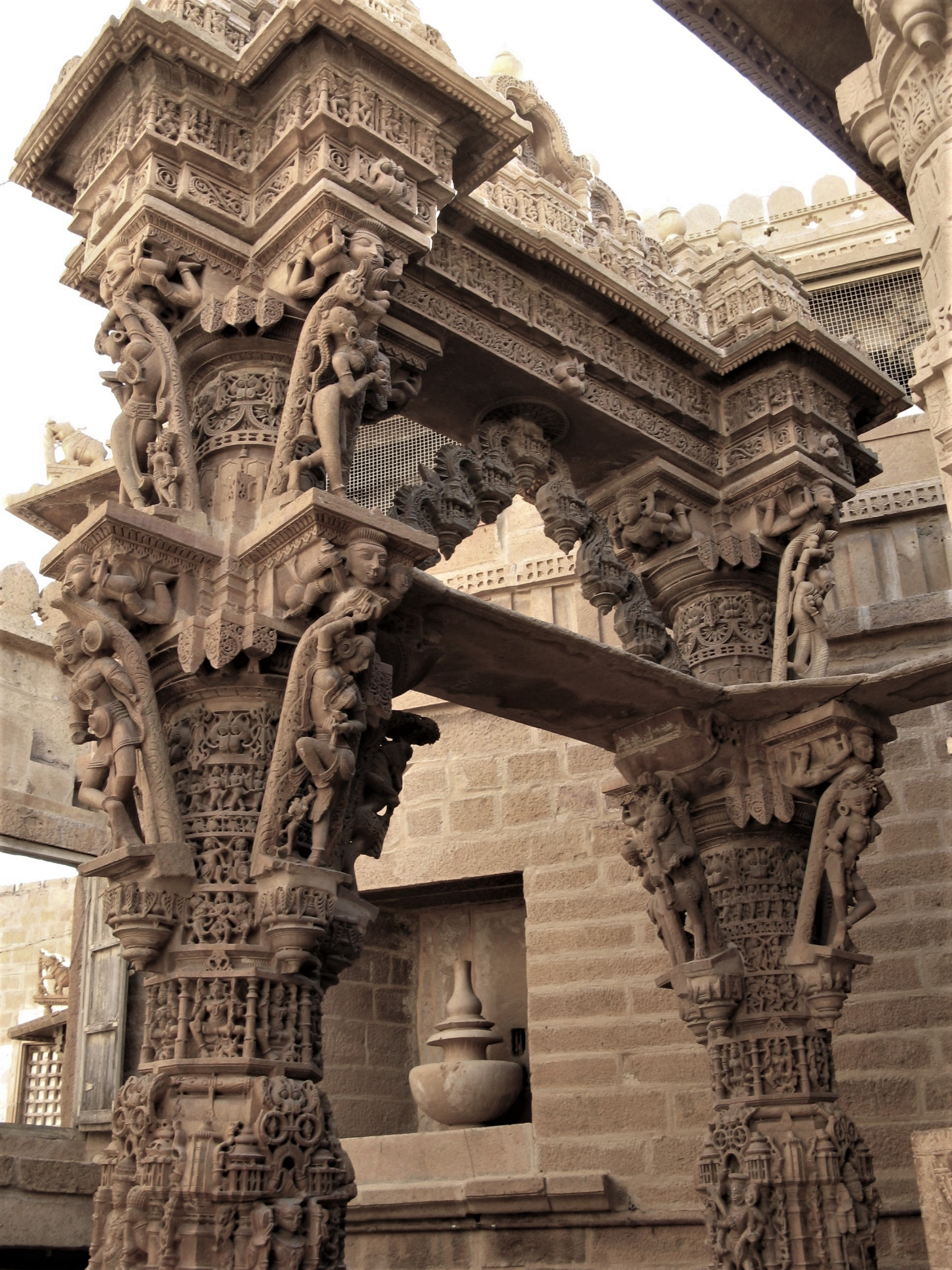
Torana at Parshvanatha temple

Jaisalmer Fort has a large complex of seven Jain temples. These Jain temples of Jaisalmer are considered architectural wonders. The group of Jain temple consist of Parsvanatha temple, Sambhavanatha temple, Shitalanatha temple, Shantinatha and Kunthunatha temple, Chandraprabha temple and Rishabhanatha temple.

The temple contains frescoes, mirrors and other forms of detailing, the temples boast exquisite designs, with the walls of the temples features intricate carvings of animals and human figures similar to Dilwara temples.

=== Parshvanatha temple ===
The Parshvanatha temple is the oldest temple in the complex. It houses a black marble idol of Parshvanatha with a hood of a serpent with multiple heads over his head, similar to that of in Lodhurva Jain temple. The temple is rich in craftsmanship and exquisite carvings. The garbhagriha wall bears carvings of animals and human figures. The shikhar of the temple is crowned with amalaka. The temple features an ornate porch and the main shrine is surrounded by 52 small shrines.

Parshvanatha temple is the oldest and most elaborate temples within the fort. Its plan consists of a garbhagriha, antarala, mandapa, trika-mandapa and mukha-mandapa. The mukha-mandapa is supported on four pillars decorated with elaborately carved toranas. The interior walls contain carvings of human and animal figures. The temple's shikhara crowned by an amalaka. A series of cells along the rear wall of the surrounding verandah contain seated images of the Tirthankaras.

=== Chandraprabha temple ===
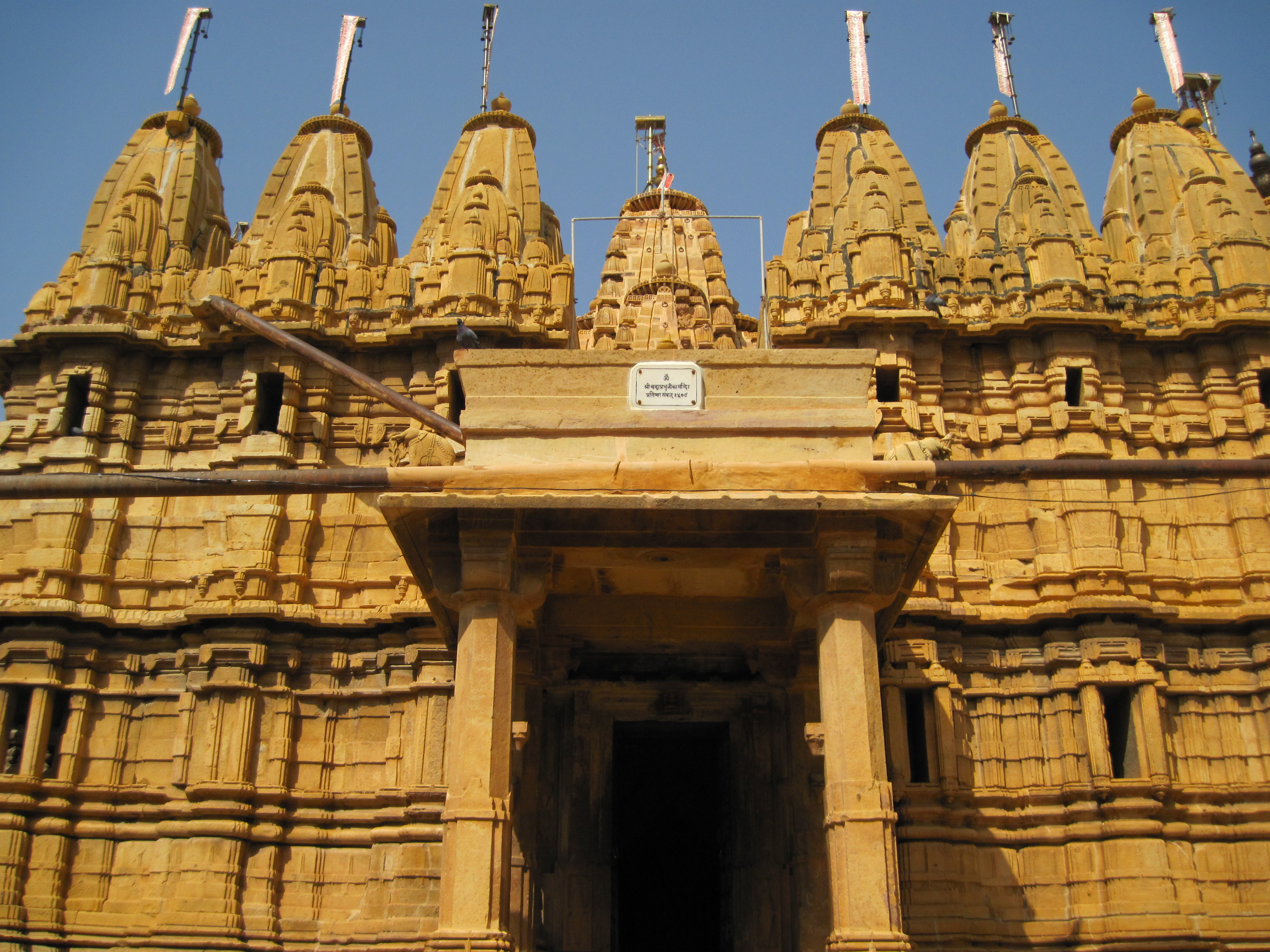
Chandraprabha temple

Chandraprabhu Jain temple interior, Jaisalmer

Chandraprabha temple was constructed in 16th century. The plan features a mandapa with iconic architecture. Ashtapadh temple features images of Vishnu, Kali and Lakshmi along with Jain deities.

=== Rishabhanatha temple ===
Rishabhanatha temple enshrines an idol of Rishabhanatha safeguarded with glass cabinets.

=== Shantinatha and Kunthunatha temples ===
The Shantinatha and Kunthunatha temples features elaborate carvings. Together with the other Jain shrines, these temples are part of the fort’s rich concentration of medieval architecture.

=== Sambhavanatha temple ===
Askaran Chopra of Merta is credited with the construction of a large temple, dedicated to Sambhavanatha, that enshrines more than 600 idols. An inscription, dated to 1440 CE, providing epigraphical evidence for Jain religious activity within Jaisalmer Fort during the 15th century.

=== Gyan Bhandar ===
Gyan Bhandar a historic Jain manuscript library associated with the Sambhavanatha temple that dates back to 12th century. The collection contains approximately 1,000 old manuscripts, including manuscripts written on palm leaves and examples with painted wooden covers. The preservation of manuscripts alongside the temples reflects the role of Jain religious establishments at Jaisalmer not only as places of worship but also as centres for the preservation of literary material.

The library also preserves paintings, astrological charts and a copy of Dronacharya's Oghaniryaktivritti.

== World Heritage status ==
Jaisalmer Fort, including its Jain temples, forms one of the six components of the Hill Forts of Rajasthan, inscribed on the UNESCO World Heritage List in 2013. The Hindu and Jain temples within the forts as evidence of the religious patronage of Rajput rulers and emphasises their richly carved architectural vocabulary. The Jain and Hindu temples at Jaisalmer are specifically cited for demonstrating changes in the north Indian Nagara temple form between the 13th and 15th centuries.

Jaisalmer Fort, including its ancient temples, is also listed as a centrally protected monument under the Archaeological Survey of India.

== Photo gallery ==
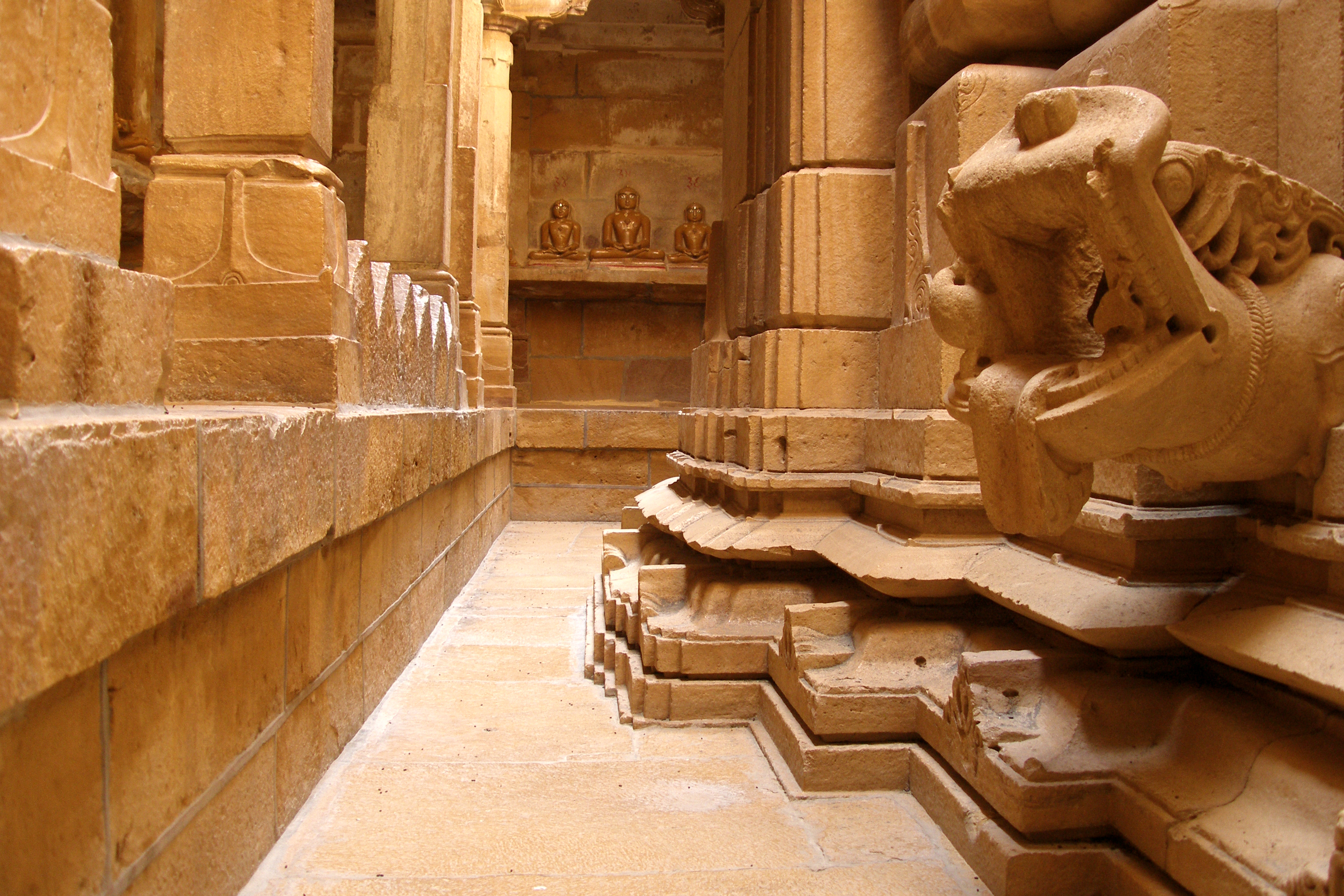
Interior

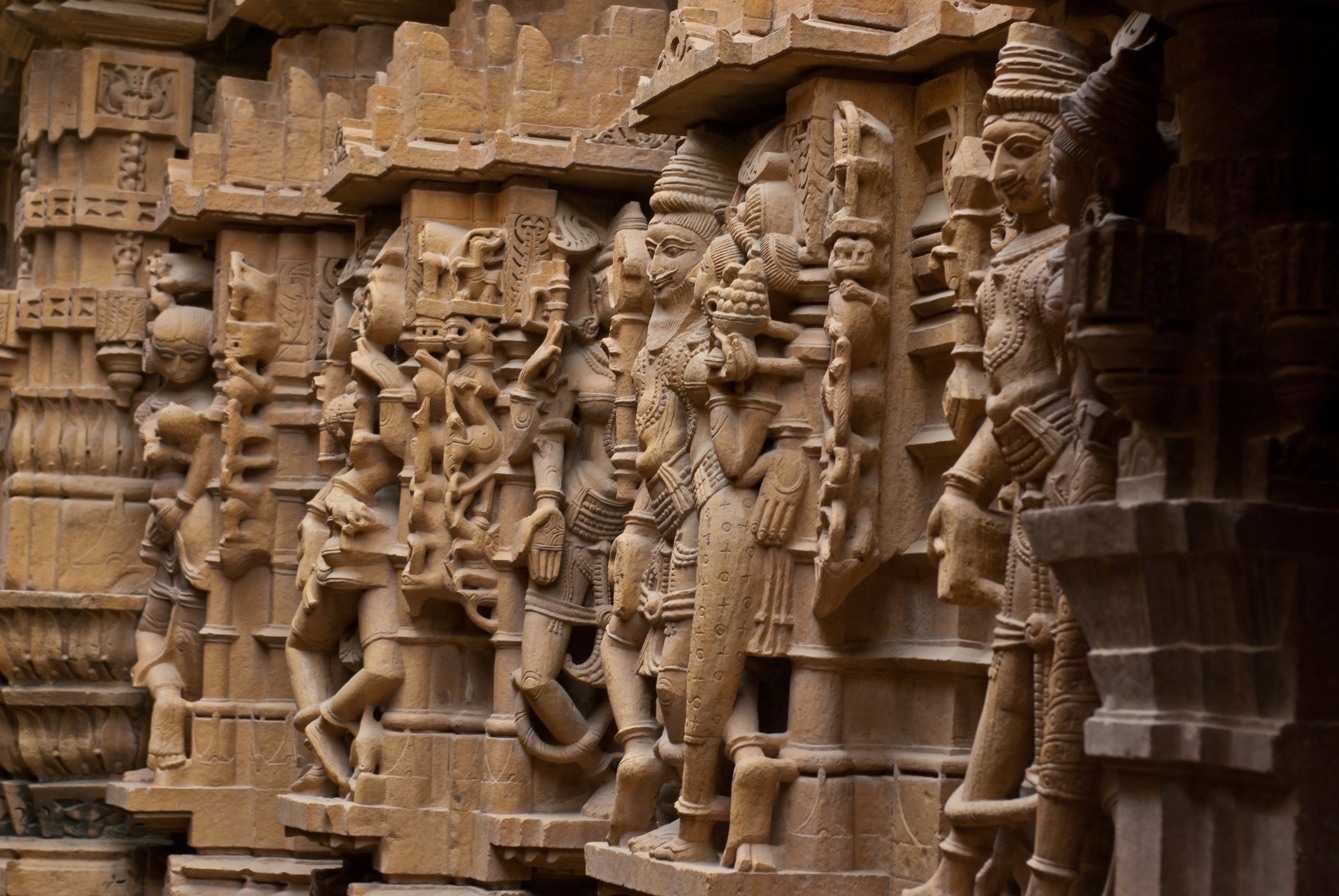
Intricate carvings on wall

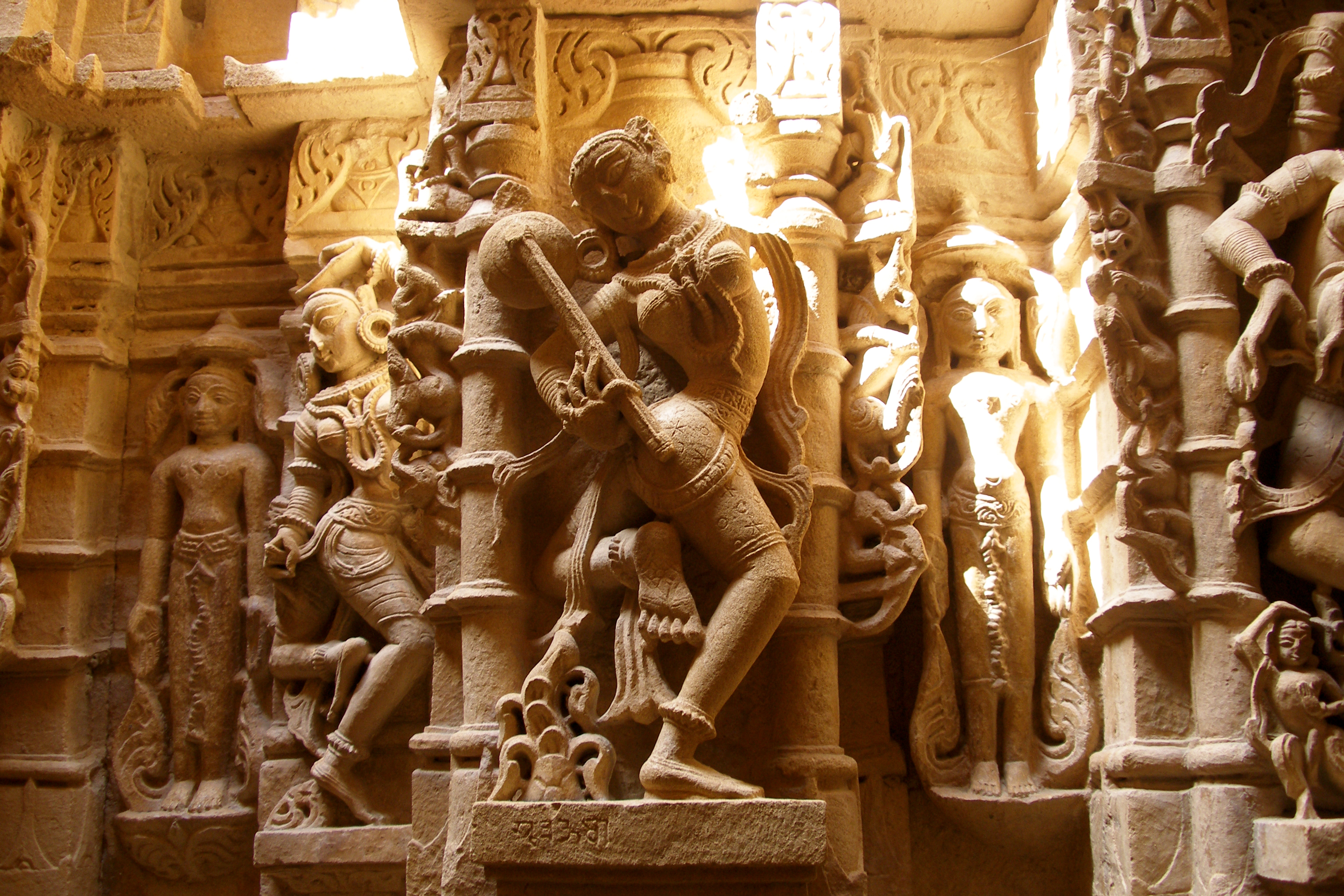
Detail of carving

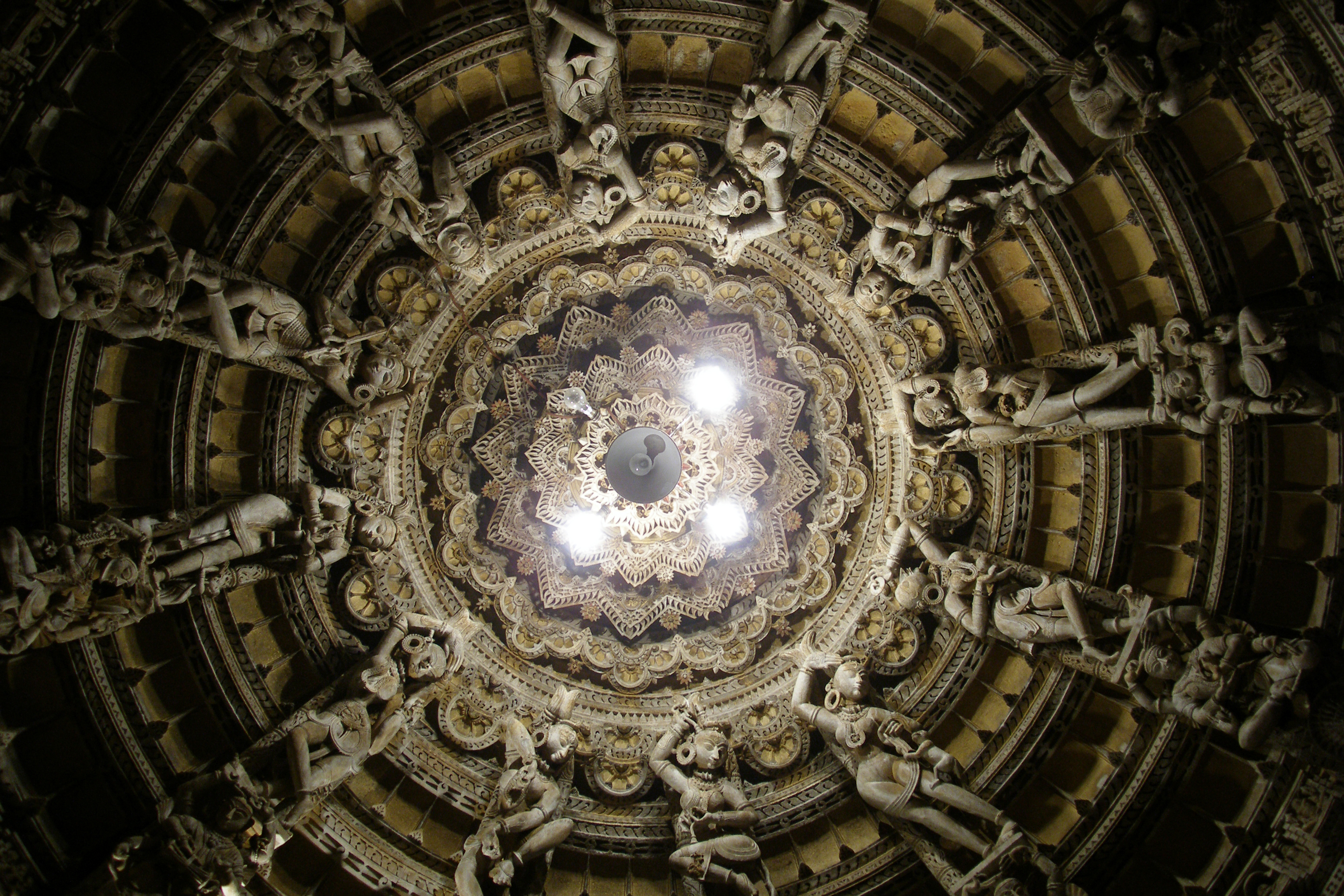
Temple ceiling

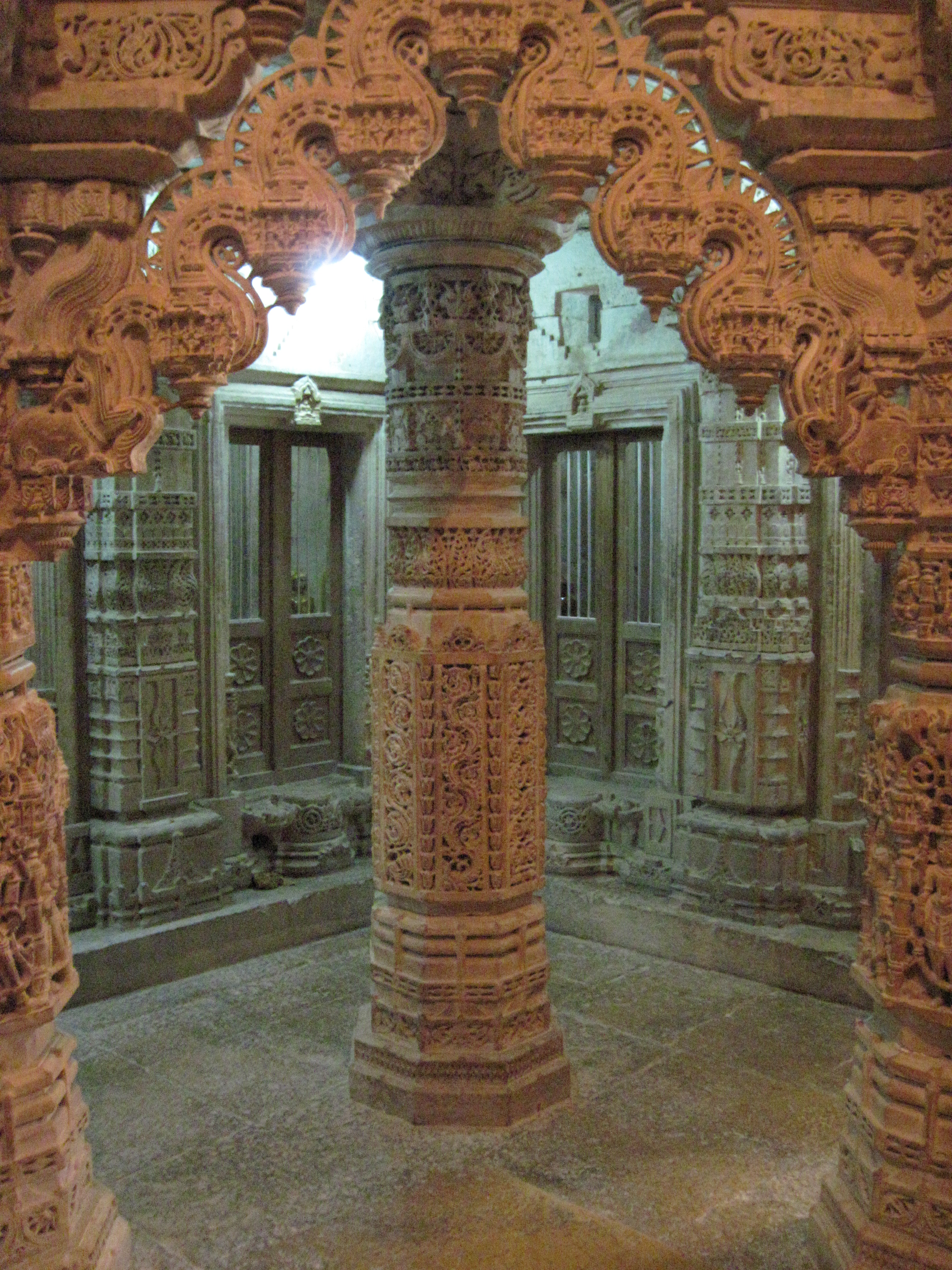
Pillars inside temple

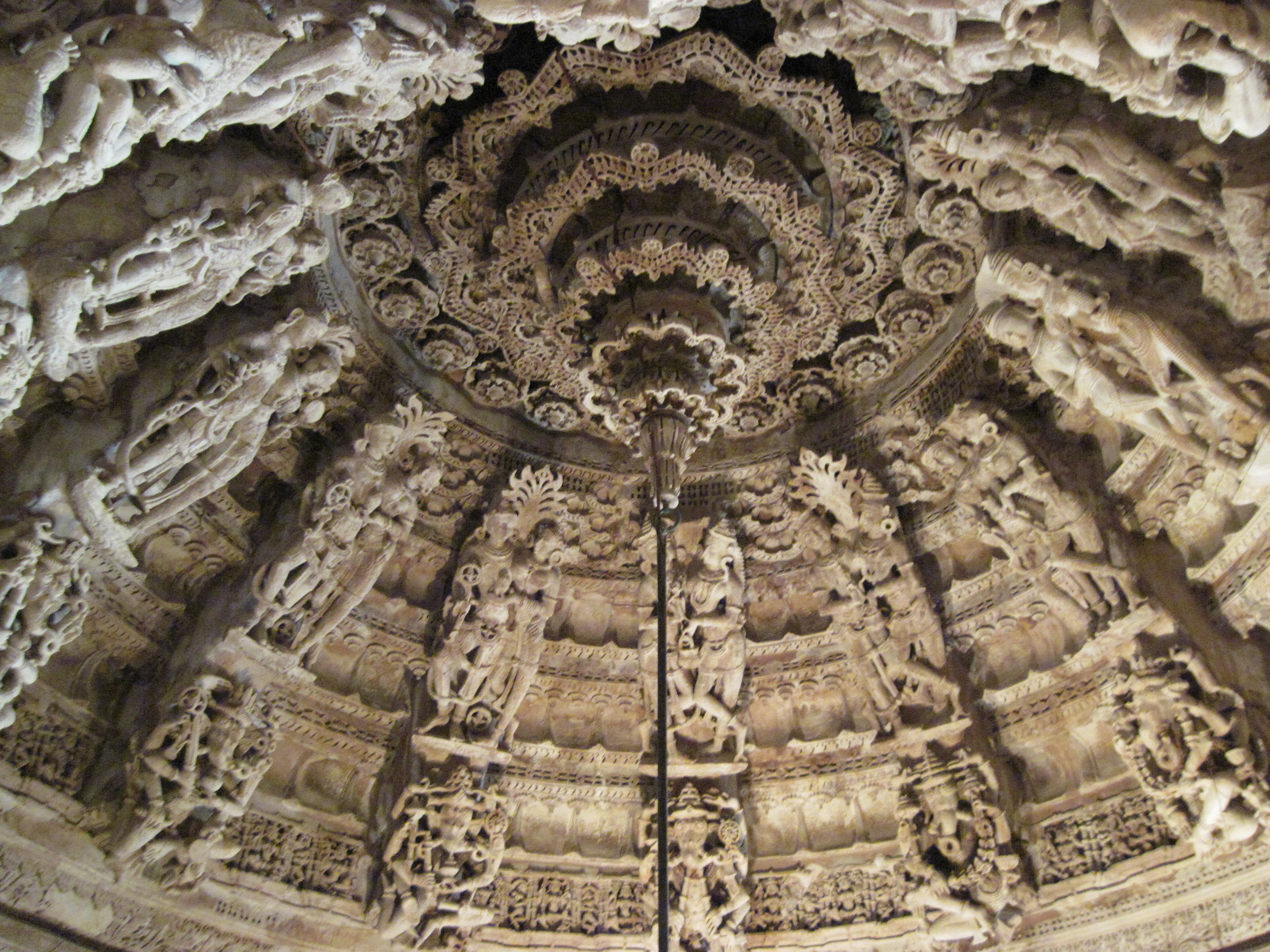
Carving of devkulika on roof

== See also ==
- Lodhurva Jain temple
- Amar Sagar Jain temple
