= Atru railway station =

Railway station in Rajasthan, India

Atru

General information
- Location: Atru, Baran district, Rajasthan; India
- Coordinates: 24.881951°N 76.670163°E
- Elevation: 288 metres (945 ft)
- System: Indian Railways station
- Owner: Indian Railways
- Operator: West Central Railway
- Line: Kota–Ruthiyai line
- Platforms: 2
- Tracks: 2

Construction
- Structure type: Standard (on ground station)
- Parking: Yes

Other information
- Status: Functioning
- Station code: ATRU
- Zone(s): West Central Railway
- Division(s): Kota
Location
- Location within India Location within Rajasthan

Atru railway station is a railway station in Baran district, Rajasthan. Its code is ATRU. It serves Atru town. The station consists of 2 platforms. Passenger, Express, and Superfast trains halt here.
