= Amar Sagar Jain temple =

19th-century Jain temple in Rajasthan, India

Coordinates: 26°55′46″N 70°52′17″E

Amar Sagar Jain Temple
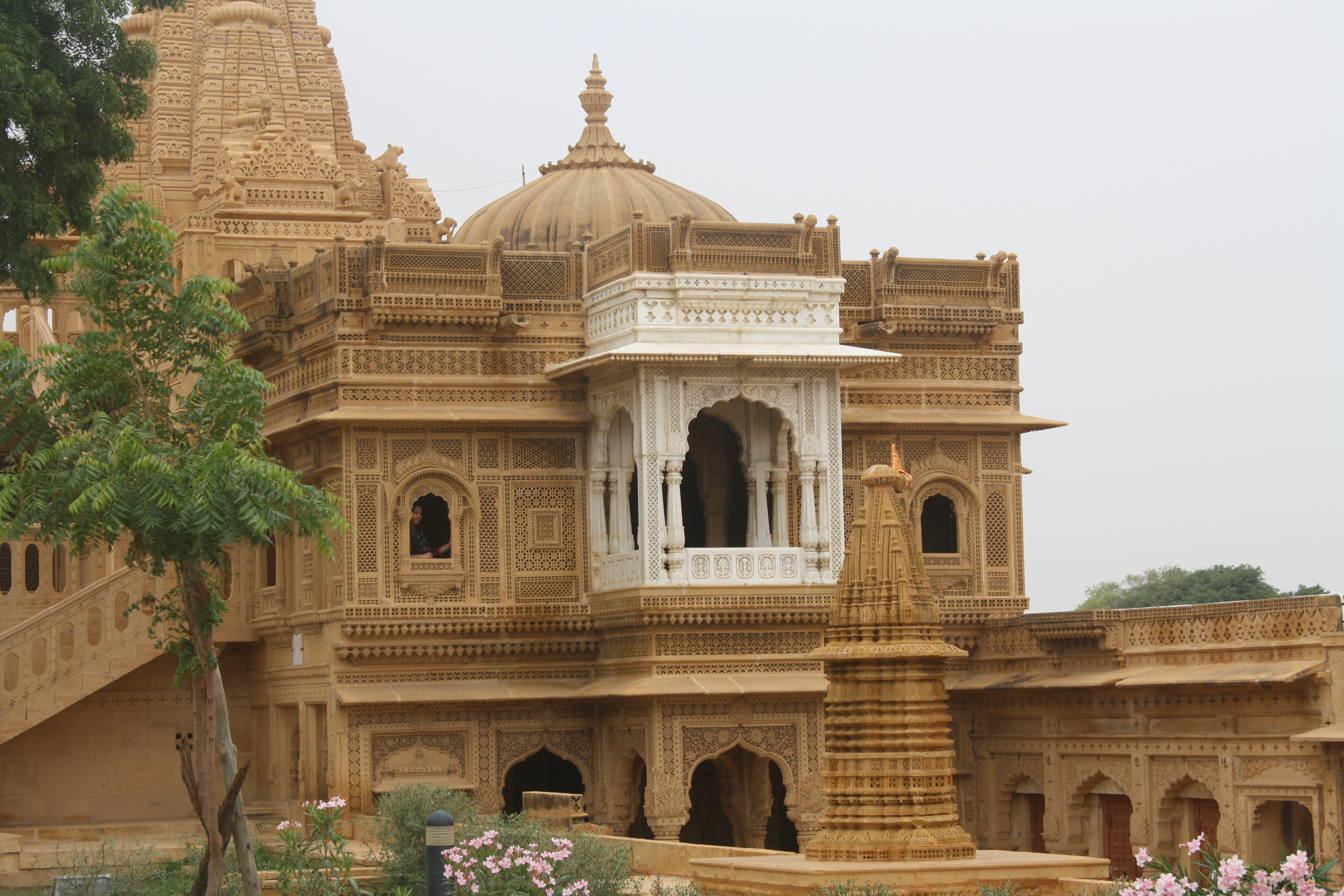
- Amar Sagar Jain Temple

Religion
- Affiliation: Jainism
- Sect: Śvētāmbara
- Deity: Rishabhanatha

Location
- Location: Amar Sagar, Jaisalmer
- State: Rajasthan
- Country: India

Architecture
- Style: Māru-Gurjara architecture
- Creator: Himmat Rai Bafna
- Established: 1871

Amar Sagar Jain Temple or Adinath Jain Temple is a Jain temple at Amar Sagar, near Jaisalmer in Rajasthan, India. It has carved stone pillars, rangamandapas and latticework.

== History ==
The Amar Sagar Jain Temple was built in 1871 CE by Himmat Rai Bafna. It belongs to the later period of Jain temple construction in the Jaisalmer region. Unlike the Jaisalmer Fort Jain temples and the Lodhurva Jain temple, which date to the medieval period, Amar Sagar was built in the 19th century.

== Architecture ==
The temple is a two-storeyed structure constructed in yellow Jaisalmer limestone. The temple is surmounted by a curvilinear shikhara adorned with multiple subsidiary turrets. The temple features an amalaka with kalasha. The exterior walls are decorated with latticework and jharokhas supported by carved brackets. The temple features richly carved pillared rangamandapas with elaborate stone carving and latticework.

The upper storey carries the principal curvilinear shikhara. Tthe temple notes the combination of the central tower with smaller turret-like forms, producing a vertically articulated superstructure. The extensive use of carved yellow limestone visually connects the building with the broader architectural traditions of Jaisalmer. The Amar Sagar temple is particularly notable for the treatment of Jaisalmer's yellow limestone. Its architectural decoration includes intricate floral carving, pierced screens and sculptural ornament. Jaisalmer limestone has historically been extensively used for temples, palaces, havelis and other monumental buildings in the region because of its suitability for detailed carving.

At Amar Sagar, the material is used for both the structural fabric and the ornamental programme of the temple, including the jalis, brackets, balconies and architectural mouldings.

== See also ==
- Jaisalmer Fort Jain temples
- Lodhurva Jain temple
