= Jagdishpura =

Village in Jaisalmer, Rajasthan, India

- Village
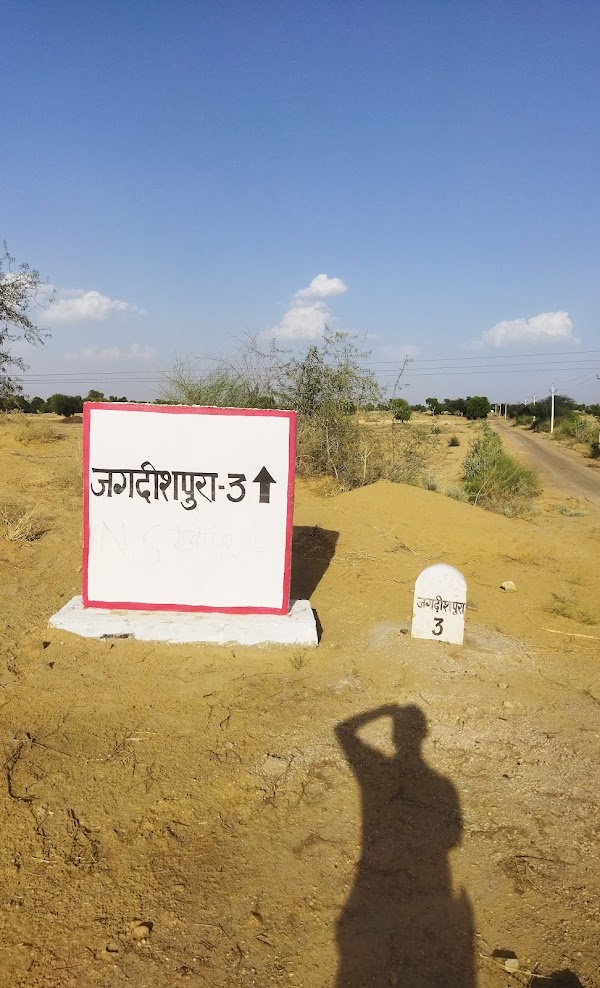
- Road going to Jagdishpura

- Location in Rajasthan, India Jagdishpura (India)
- Coordinates: 27.472079963915846°N 71.16973827412104°E
- Country: India
- State: Rajasthan
- District: Jaisalmer

Government
  - Type: Panchayati Raj (India)
  - Body: Gram Panchayat

Population (2011)
  - Total: 225

Languages: Rajasthani, Marwadi
  - Official: Hindi
- Time zone: UTC+5:30 (IST)
- PIN: 345033
- Vehicle registration: RJ- RJ15

Jagdishpura is a bustling agricultural community and a small village in Jawahar Nagar Gram Panchayat and Mohangarh Panchayat Samiti (Block), located in Jaisalmer District, Rajasthan, India. It is approximately 25 km from the Panchayat Samiti headquarters in Mohangarh and about 10 km from the Gram Panchayat headquarters in Jawahar Nagar. Jagdishpura is primarily known for its agricultural landscape, supported by a branch distributary of the Indira Gandhi Nahar Project. Suthar Mandi, the nearest market town for regional farmers, is located about 7 km from Jagdishpura.

The total area of Jagdishpura is 1,130 hectares, according to data from 2009. As per the 2011 census, the village has a population of 225 people living in 51 households. Of the total population, 129 are male and 96 are female, constituting 57.33% and 42.67%, respectively. Jagdishpura has a lower literacy rate compared to Rajasthan. In 2011, the literacy rate in Jagdishpura was 62.50%, while the average literacy rate for Rajasthan was 66.11%. Male literacy in the village stands at 73.87%, while female literacy is 46.91%.
