= Suthar Mandi =

Locality in village Jawahar Nagar, Jaisalmer, Rajasthan, India

- Locality
- Location in Rajasthan, India Suthar Mandi (India)
- Coordinates: 27.54206143288769°N 71.1496801154148°E
- Country: India
- State: Rajasthan
- District: Jaisalmer
- Village: Jawahar Nagar
- Time zone: UTC+5:30
- PIN: 345033
- Vehicle registration: RJ- RJ15

Suthar Mandi is a locality in Jawahar Nagar Gram Panchayat of Mohangarh Panchayat Samiti (Block) in Jaisalmer District, Rajasthan. It is 3.5 km east of the Jawahar Nagar Gram Panchayat headquarters. Suthar Mandi is primarily known for its agricultural market, where farmers from the Rajasthan Canal region sell their crops to buyers. Mohangarh, the nearest town, is about 30 km away from Suthar Mandi.
