= Manahar =

Coordinates: 24°11′N 84°07′E

Manahar is a village in the Chandauli district of the Indian state of Uttar Pradesh.

== Demographics ==
The village consists of twelve houses. The literacy rate is 91.50%, with approximately 85% of the population in the age group of 50-70 years, 90% in the age group of 30-50 years, and 100% in the age group of 5-30 years being literate. Students from the village attend various educational institutions, including Kendriya Vidyalaya, private schools, state universities, and central universities such as Kashi Vidyapeeth, Banaras Hindu University, Pondicherry University, and Chhattisgarh Central University. Some residents have also received technical education from institutions like Chandauli Polytechnic.

Despite its small size, the village is known for its rich culture and community spirit.

== Transport ==
Manahar is well connected via railway and roadways. The village is accessible by the state highway Chandauli-Chakiya-Naugarh and National Highway (NH-2). GT Road is 4.5 km from the village. The distance between Manahar and Varanasi is only 30 km. Means of transport are available 24/7.

== Economy ==
Agriculture is a primary source of income for the village. Agricultural land is very costly here due to the direct connection to Varanasi. Rice and wheat are the major crops, generating most of the income. The village is also known for its mango trees, which produce various varieties.

Many residents work in the armed forces, such as the Indian Army and Police. Others are employed in the Panchayati Raj Vibhag, the railway, and UPPCL. A smaller number of residents work in education, including positions as primary school teachers and Navodaya Vidyalaya teachers.

== Geography ==
The Indira Gandhi Canal flows to the west of the village from north to south. It was constructed under the leadership of P.T. Kamalapati Tripathi, the then Chief Minister of Uttar Pradesh. The canal covers the entire Pratappur Gramsabha. The holy Ganga river is 25 km away from the village in the northwest direction at Baluaa-Chandauli and 30 km away to the west in Varanasi. Two other rivers, Chandraprabha and Karmanasha, also flow to the south and east of the village. The famous tourist destinations Rajdari and Devdari waterfalls are 30 km to the south. The renowned Naugarh Fort is 60 km from the village.
