= Indira Gandhi Canal =

Longest canal in India

- Interactive map of Indira Gandhi Canal

Specifications
- Length: 650 km (400 miles)

History
- Former names: Rajasthan Canal
- Construction began: 1958
- Date of first use: 2005
- Date completed: Last portion of canal finished in 2010

Geography
- Start point: Harike Barrage, Punjab
- End point: Thar Desert, Rajasthan (.)
- Branch of: Sutlej; Beas
- Connects to: Thar Desert

The Indira Gandhi Canal (also still known by the revered sacred name Saraswati Rupa Rajasthan Canal, also formerly officially called Rajasthan Canal) with total length of 837 kilometres (520 mi), is the longest canal in India which begins in Punjab state at the Harike Barrage (confluence of the Satluj and Beas rivers), flows a short distance through northwest part of Haryana state, and ends in the Thar Desert near Gadra Road in western Rajasthan. The course of Indira Gandhi Canal is subdivided into 4 sections, Rajasthan Feeder Canal (RF Canal) N-SW flowing 204 kilometres (127 mi) long course from Harike Barrage in Ferozepur district to Masitawali village in Hanumangarh, Indira Gandhi Main Canal (IGM Canal) N-SW flowing 445 kilometres (277 mi) long course from Masitawali to Mohangarh northeast of Jaisalmer, Sagarmal Gopa Branch Canal (SGB Canal) E-W flowing 96 kilometres (60 mi) long course from Mohangarh to Gunjangarh-Ramgarh northwest of Jaisalmer, Baba Ramdev Sub-branch Canal (BRSB Canal) N-S flowing 92 kilometres (57 mi) long course from Gunjangarh-Ramgarh toward Gadra Road town in Barmer district.

Indira Gandhi Canal follows Ghaggar paleochannel of the now-lost sacred Sarasvati River with natural incline, thus requiring no pumping station along the way, hence also the name Saraswati Rupa Rajasthan Canal. Indira Gandhi Canal forms the Rajasthan section of the revived ancient Saraswati River with numerous Indus-Sarasvati Valley Civilisation sites along its course, rest being in upstream Haryana-Punjab and downstream Gujarat.

== Etymology ==
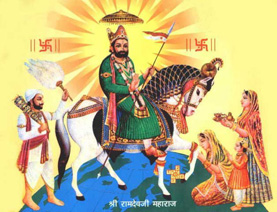
Baba Ramdev Pir.

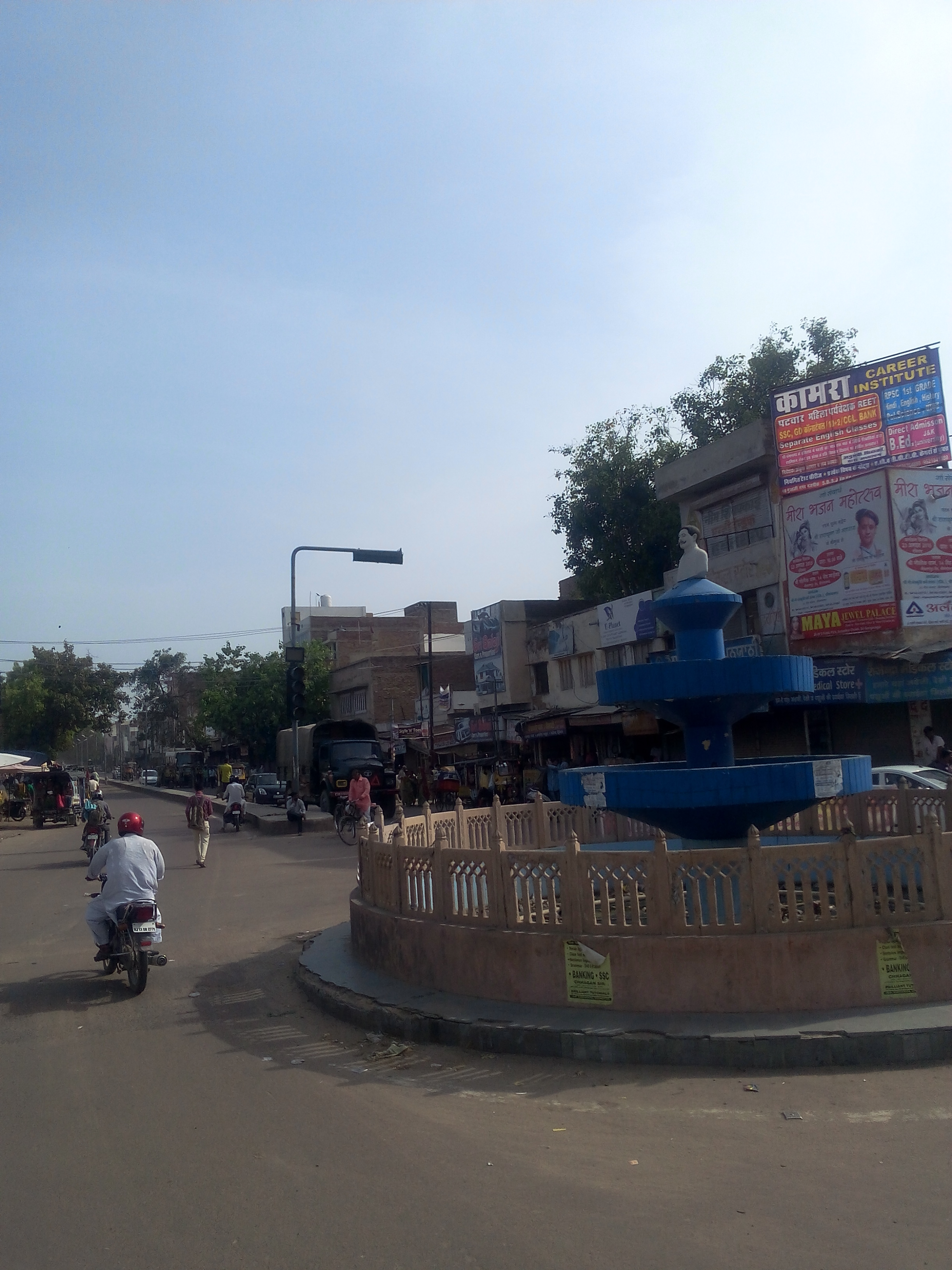
Birbal Chowk square in Sri Ganganagar in remembrance of Birbal.

=== Names of the canal and its branches ===
Previously named as the Rajasthan Canal after the state of Rajasthan it irrigates, it was renamed as the Indira Gandhi Canal following the assassination of Prime Minister Indira Gandhi.

Sagarmal Gopa Branch Canal is named after the Sagarmal Gopa (1900-1946 CE), a freedom fighter from Jaisalmer.

Baba Ramdev Sub-branch Canal (BRSB Canal) is named after the Baba Ramdev (1352–1385 CE, 1409–1442 Vikram Samvat), a 14th-century Hindu rishi (sage), who has a shrine at Ramdevra village situated about 12 km to the north of Pokhran. Baba Ramdev Sub-branch Canal was initially named the Gadra Road Sub-Branch after the Gadra Road town by which it flows, then renamed as Barkatulla Khan sub-branch after the Chief Minister of Rajasthan Barkatullah Khan (r. 1971–73), and finally renamed to its present name Baba Ramdev Sub-branch Canal.

Shaheed Birbal Branch Canal (SBB Canal) is named after the Birbal Singh, an Indian freedom fighter from Raisinghnagar who was killed in firing by Bikaner princely state police in 1946.

=== Saraswati Rupa Rajasthan Canal ===
Saraswati Rupa Rajasthan Canal, also known as the Indira Gandhi Canal, is named after the sacred Saraswati River, whose paleochannel the Indira Gandhi Canal now follows. In 1980, when then-Prime Minister Indira Gandhi inaugurated the Rajasthan Canal, as it was officially known at the time, one inscription on its bank referred to it as the "Saraswati Rupa Rajasthan Canal." The scientific research proves that this canal follows the paleochannel of rig vedic Sarasvati River.

== History ==
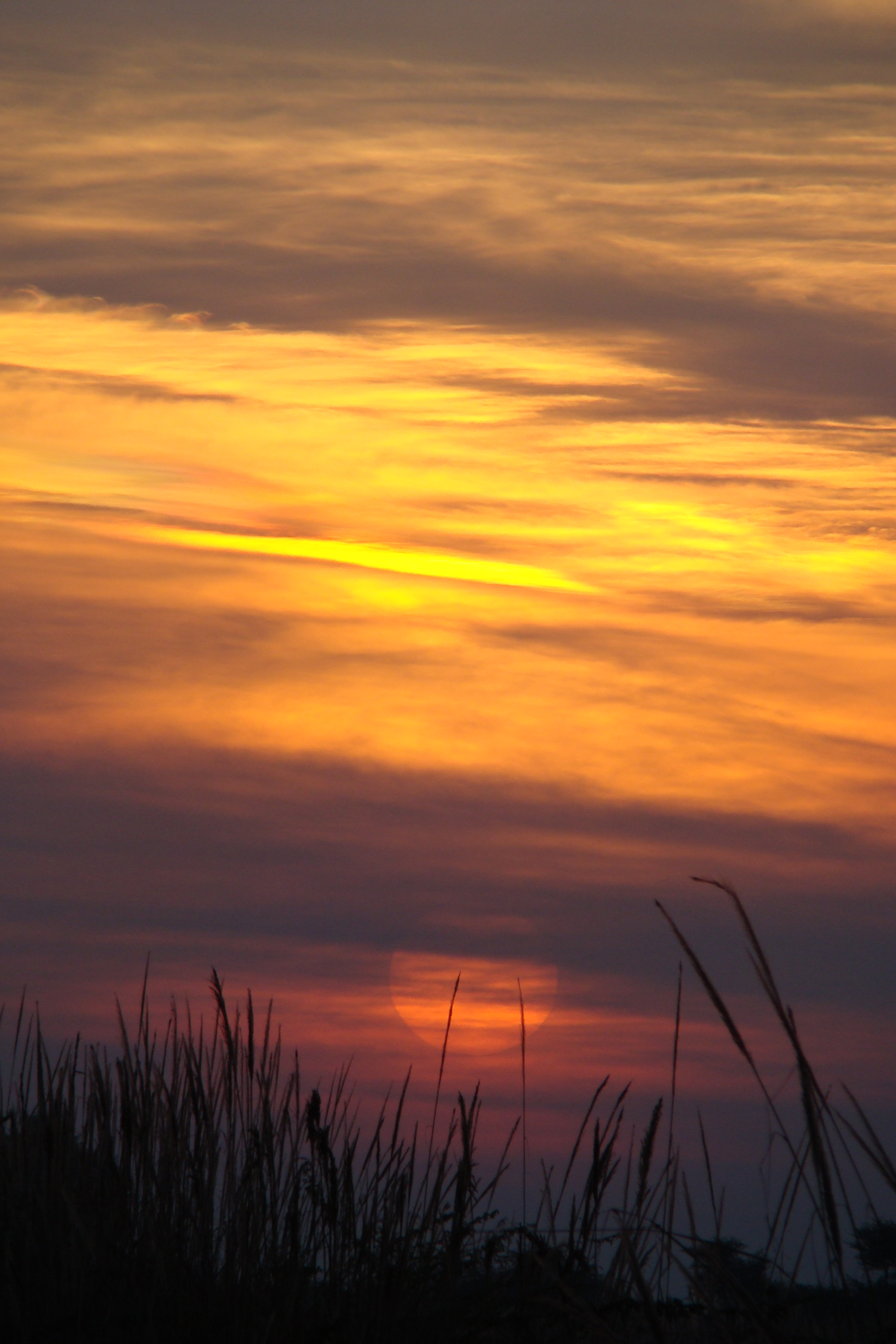
Sunset over the Indira Gandhi Canal.

=== 1940-2010: Rajasthan Canal project ===
The idea of bringing the waters from the Himalayan Rivers flowing through Punjab and into Pakistan was conceived by hydraulic engineer Kanwar Sain in the late 1940s. Sain estimated that 2,000,000 ha (20,000 km^{2}) of desert land in Bikaner and the northwest corner of Jaisalmer could be irrigated by the stored waters of the Punjab rivers. In 1960, the Indus Water Treaty was signed between India and Pakistan, which gave India the right to use the water from three rivers: the Satluj, Beas, and Ravi. The plan for the Rajasthan Canal at that time envisioned the use of 7,600,000 acre-feet (9.4×10^{9} m^{3}), 9,400 hm³ of water.

The canal faced severe financial constraints, neglect, and corruption. Stage I was completed in 1983 around 20 years behind the completion schedule, stage .

The Canal was constructed in two stages.

==== 1958-1986: Stage-I construction ====
Stage I consists of the construction of the

- Rajasthan Feeder Canal, from Harike barrage in Firozpur district of Punjab to Masitawali (Hanumangarh) in Rajasthan, and
- Indira Gandhi Main Canal's 189 km (117 mi) section from Masitawali (in Hanumangarh district of Rajasthan) to Pugal (in Bikaner district of Rajasthan).
- Stage I also included constructing a distributary canal system of about 2,950 km (1,830 mi) in length.

Stage I was completed in 1983-86, more than 20 years behind the original completion schedule.

==== 1992-2010: Stage-II construction ====
Stage II involved the construction of

- Indira Gandhi Main Canal's 256 km (159 mi) long section from Pugal (Bikaner) to Mohangarh (Jaisalmer)
- distributary canal network of 3,600 km (2,200 mi).
- revised distributary canal network: The main canal was planned to be 140 ft (43 m) wide at the top and 116 ft (35 m) wide at the bottom with a water depth of 21 ft (6.4 m). Scheduled to be completed by 1971, facing delays, the plan was revised in 1970, and it was decided that the entire canal would be lined with concrete tiles. Five more lift schemes were added, and the flow command of Stage II was increased by 100,000 ha (1,000 km^{2}). With increased requirements, the total length of main, feeder, and distribution canals was about 9,245 km (5,745 mi).
- Stage II was completed in 2010, around 15 years behind the original completion schedule.

=== 1984: Renamed as Indira Gandhi Canal ===
On 2 November 1984, following the assassination of Prime Minister Indira Gandhi, the Rajasthan Canal was officially renamed as the Indira Gandhi Canal.

== Course and branches ==
=== Main course ===
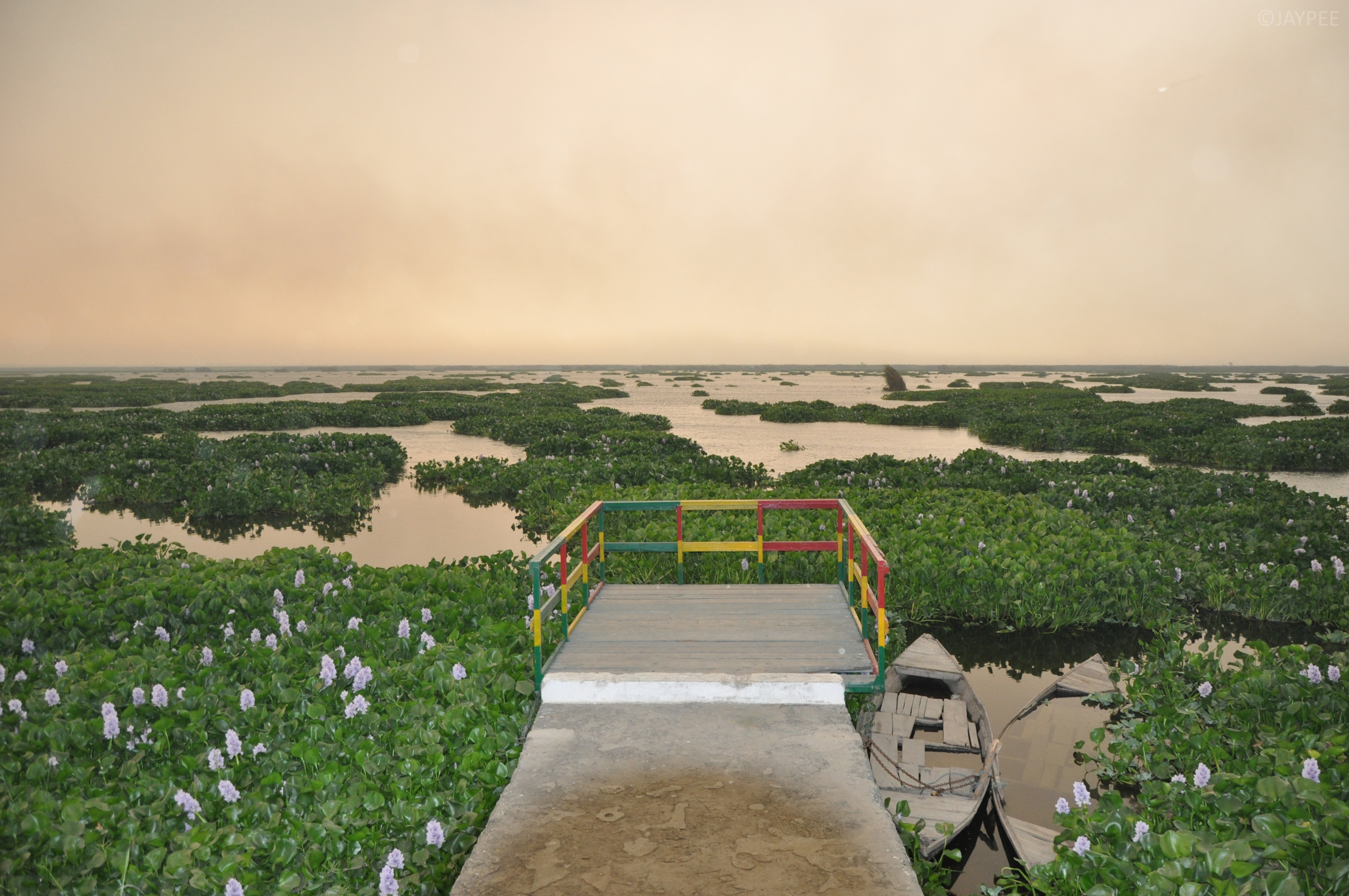
Harike Barrage wetland, the confluence of Sutlej and Beas where the Rajasthan Feeder Canal (RF Canal) begins

Indira Gandhi Canal's main course is divided into the following four subsections:

- Rajasthan Feeder Canal (RF Canal), N-SW flowing 204 kilometres (127 mi) long course begins in Punjab at Harike Barrage, immediate downstream from the confluence of the Satluj and Beas rivers in Ferozepur district at Harike village 35 km south of Taran Taran city and 45 km northeast of Firozpur city, and flows a short distance through northwest part of Haryana state, it ends at Masitawali village 30 km southeast of Hanumangarh city in northwest Rajasthan.

- Indira Gandhi Main Canal (IGM Canal), N-SW flowing 445 kilometres (277 mi) long course begins at Masitawali at the end of Rajasthan Feeder Canal and then it sequentially traverses through western districts of Rajasthan, namely Hanumangarh, Bikaner, Phalodi, Jaisalmer, before ending at Mohangarh village 60 km northeast of Jaisalmer city.

- Sagarmal Gopa Branch Canal (SGB Canal), E-W flowing 96 kilometres (60 mi) long course begins at Mohangarh at the end of Indira Gandhi Main Canal, and continues to flow west before ending at Gunjangarh-Ramgarh villages 70 km northwest of Jaisalmer city.

- Baba Ramdev Sub-branch Canal (BRSB Canal), N-S flowing 92 kilometres (57 mi), it begins at Gunjangarh-Ramgarh at the end of E-W flowing Sagarmal Gopa Branch Canal where it turns south and flows toward Gadra Road town (6 km from India–Pakistan border, 86 km west of Barmer city, and 40 km east of beating retreat border ceremony) at Munabao border crossing to Pakistan).

=== Branches ===
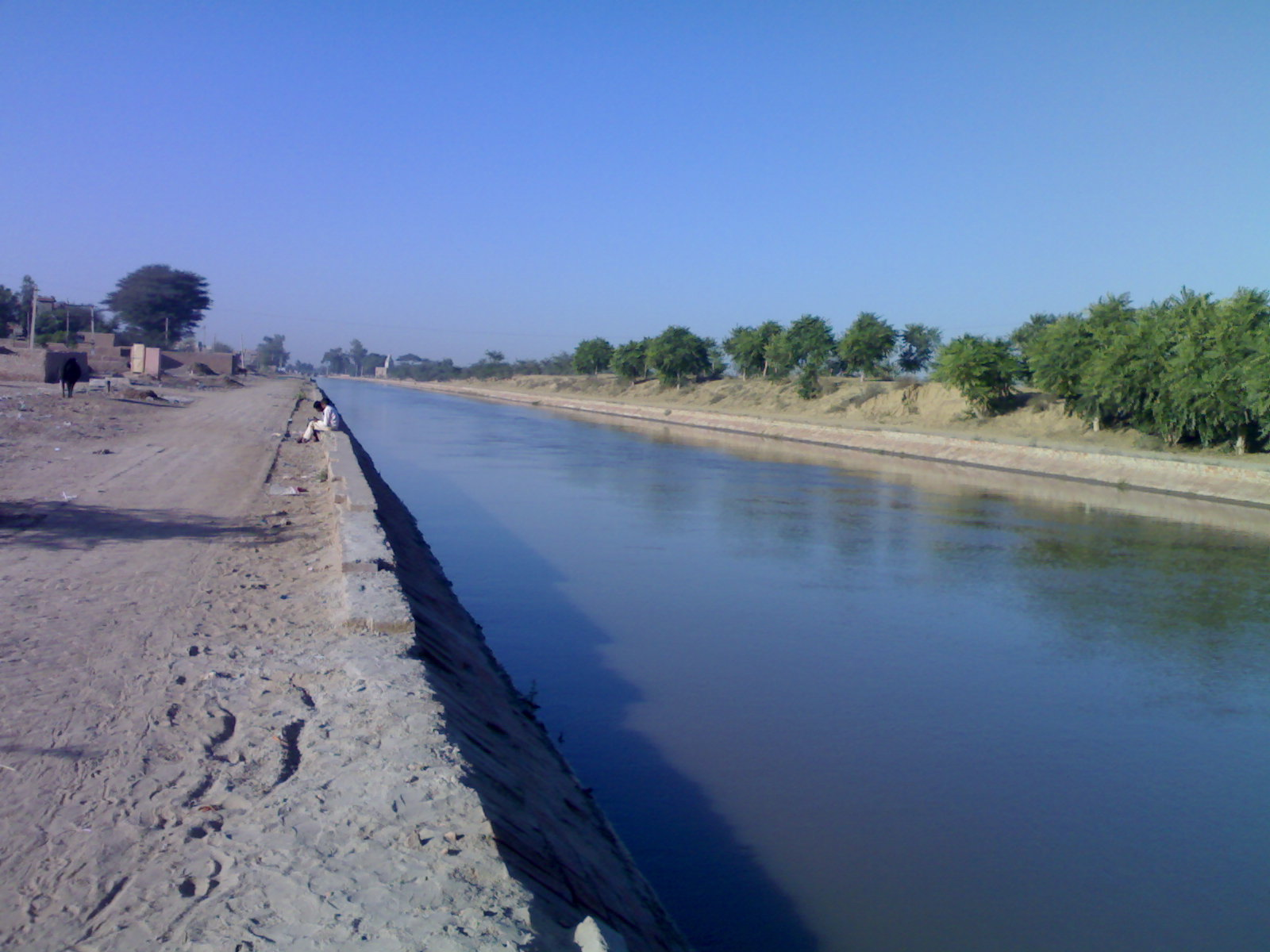
Anupgarh Branch Canal near Rawla Mandi in Ganganagar district

==== Indira Gandhi Main Canal ====
Indira Gandhi Main Canal has seven gravity branches mainly on the northern bank and seven lift irrigation branches mainly on the southern bank:

===== Gravity flow branch canals =====
Flow due to gravity without a lift irrigation system.

- North bank of Indira Gandhi Canal towards the India-Pakistan Border
  - Suratgarh Branch Canal (SB Canal) serves the Ganganagar district.
  - Anupgarh Branch Canal (AB Canal), serves the Ganganagar district.
  - Poogal Branch Canal (PB Canal) serves the Ganganagar district.
  - Dator Branch Canal (DB Canal), serves the Bikaner district.
  - Birsalpur Branch Canal (BS Canal) serves the Bikaner district.
  - Charanwal Branch Canal (CB Canal) serves Bikaner and Jaisalmer districts.
  - Shaheed Birbal Branch Canal (SBB Canal) serves Jaisalmer district.
- South bank of Indira Gandhi Canal towards Aravali range
  - Rawatsar Branch Canal (RB Canal) serves the Hanumangarh district.

===== Lift canals =====
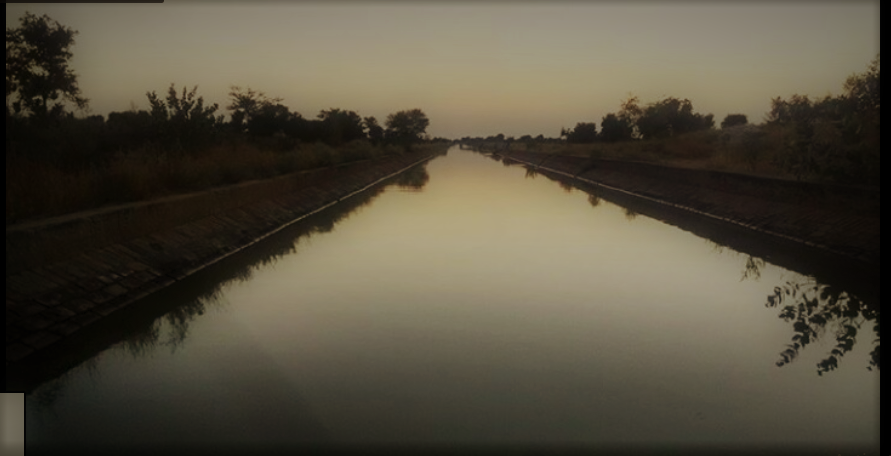
Indira Gandhi Main Canal's one of the lift canal near Raiya Tunda village in Churu district

There are a total of seven lift canals. These are all on the southern bank of the main Indira Gandhi Canal and require lift irrigation due to a lack of gravitational flow:

- Chaudhary Kumbha Ram Arya Lift Canal (Gandheli-Sahwa Lift Project or Aapni Scheme), irrigates Hanumangarh, Churu and Jhunjhunu districts, longest lift canal of Indira Gandhi Canal after counting all its subsidiary branches, named after Kumbha Ram Arya (10 May 1914 – 26 October 1995) - a freedom fighter and parliamentarian.
- Kanwar Sen Lift Canal, irrigates north-southern Bikaner, the longest stand-alone lift canal of Indira Gandhi Canal without counting its subsidiary branches, named after Kanwar Sen, who was the chief engineer in the Bikaner state who came up with the idea of Rajasthan Canal.
- Panna Lal Lift Canal, irrigates Nagaur district via southcentral Bikaner, named after Pannalal Barupal (6 April 1913 – 19 May 1983) - an independence activist and Indian politician representing the Ganganagar Lok Sabha seat.
- Veer Tejaji Lift Canal, irrigates southernmost Bikaner, the shortest Lift Canal, named after Veer Teja.
- Dr. Karni Singh Lift Canal, irrigates Phalodi and Jodhpur districts, named after Karni Singh (21 April 1924 – 6 September 1988) - last Maharaja of Bikaner State.
- Guru Jambheshwar Lift Canal, irrigates Phalodi district, named after Guru Jambheshwar.
- Jai Narayan Vyas Lift Canal, irrigates southeast Jaisalmer district, named after Jai Narayan Vyas (18 February 1899 – 14 March 1963) - third chief minister of the State of Rajasthan.

==== Sagarmal Gopa Branch Canal ====
Branches of Sagarmal Gopa Branch Canal (SGB Canal), which serves Jaisalmer district and is named after Sagarmal Gopa, are as follows.

- Lilwa Sub-Branch Canal (LSB Canal) also begins at Mihangarh, where Sagarmal Gopa Branch Canal begins.
- Digha Sub-Branch Canal (DSB Canal) also begins at Mohangarh, where Sagarmal Gopa Branch Canal begins.

== Impact ==
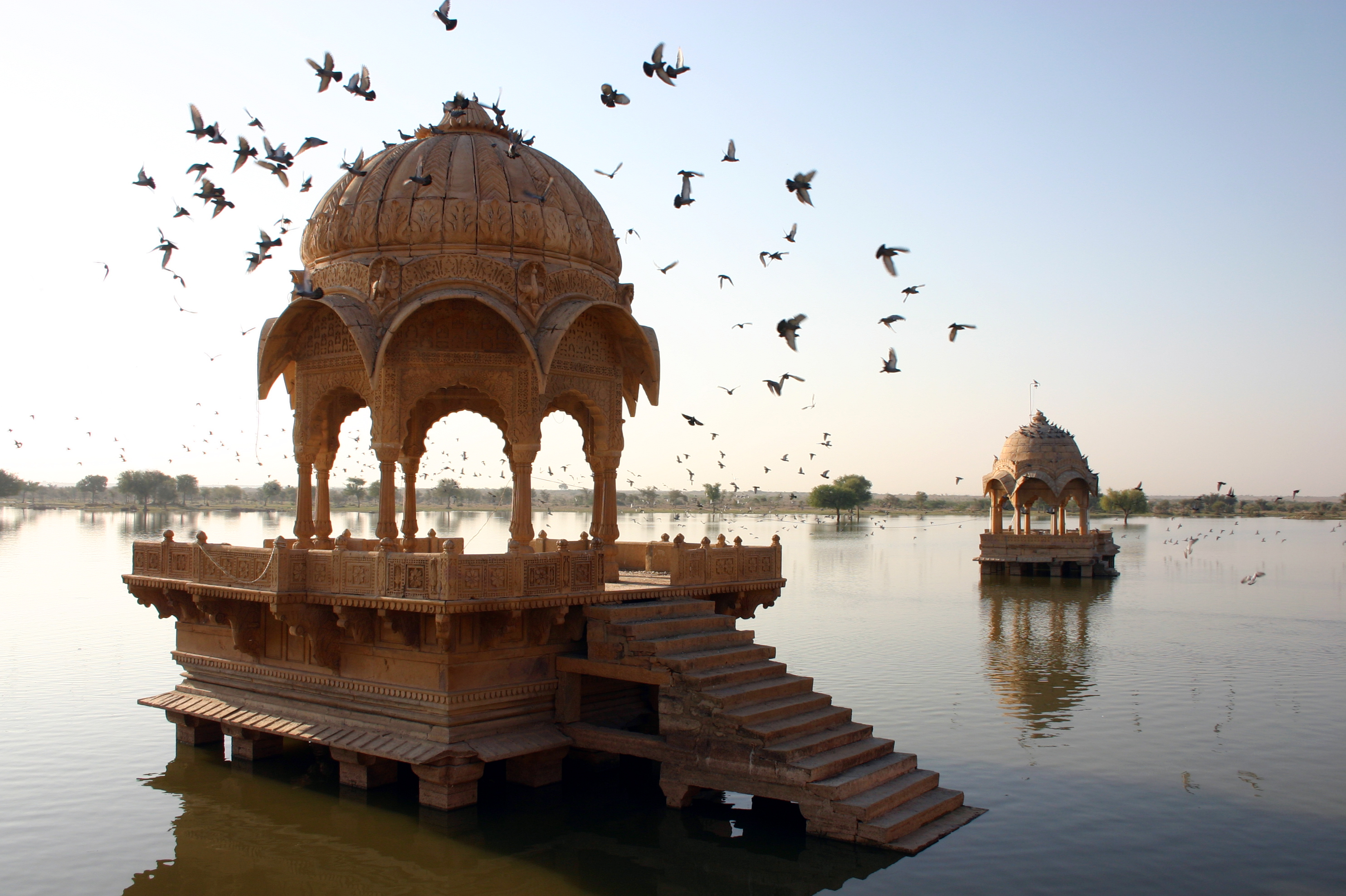
Gadisar Lake (Amar Sagar) in Jaisalmer is also fed by Indira Gandhi Canal.

After the construction of the Indira Gandhi Canal, potable drinking water and irrigation facilities became available over an area of 6,770 km^{2} (1,670,000 acres) in Jaisalmer district and 37 km^{2} (9,100 acres) in Barmer district. Mustard, cotton, and wheat now grow in this semi-arid Thar desert region of northwestern India, where nothing grew earlier. However, many people question whether the project has achieved its full potential, as more land can still be brought under irrigation if more water becomes available.

== Future development ==
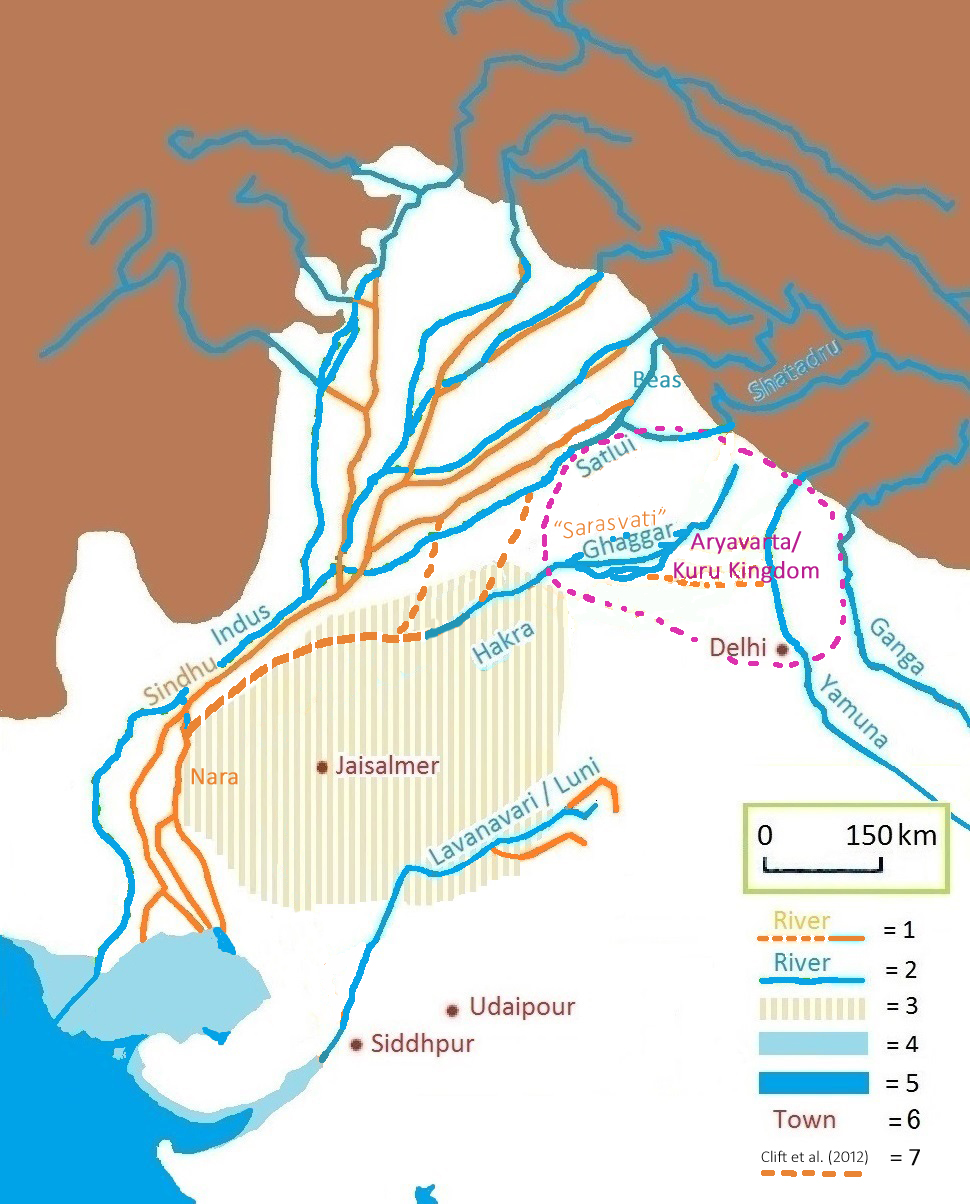
Sarasvati ancient channel

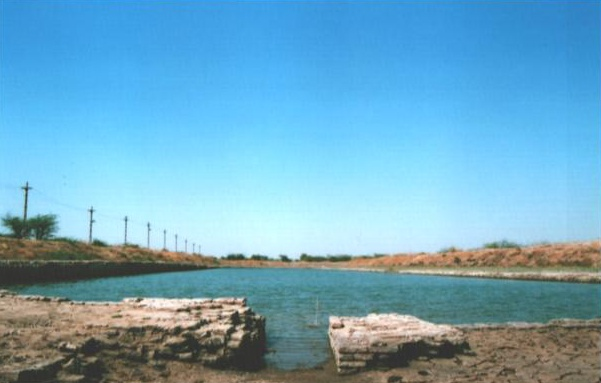
Indus-Saravati Civilisation era dock at Lothal, the world's oldest known manmade dock

=== Revival of paleo rigvedic Sarasvati River ===
The research by the Vaidik Saraswati Nadi Shodh Sansthan (lit. Vaidik Saraswati River Research Centre) at Jodhpur, Sarasvati Heritage Development Board (SHDB) at Kurukshetra, India's space agency ISRO, Oil and Natural Gas Corporation Limited (ONGC) shows that the course of Indira Gandhi Canal follows one of the paleochannels of rigvedic Sarasvati River.

Joint efforts by several states en route, from the origin of its initial tributaries in Uttarakhand and Himachal, to its paleodelta in Gujarat, via Haryana (212 km revived channel), Punjab, Rajasthan, are on to map and revive the Rig Vedic flow till Gujarat and build religious tourism and irrigation-cum-flood control facilities along the way. The Sarasvati revival project of Haryana seeks to build channels and dams along the route of the lost river in Haryana, and develop it as a tourist and pilgrimage circuit. Downstream, Indira Gandhi Canal (Saraswati Rupa Rajasthan Canal) in Rajasthan through its tail in southern Barmer district and Great Rann of Kutch with ancient dock at Lothal (one of the southernmost sites of the ancient Indus-Saraswati Valley civilisation with trade links to Mesopotamia and Sumer) in Gujarat form the paleochannel of Saraswati.

=== Indus interbasin water transfer projects ===
India is embarking on several projects for the interbasin transfer of various rivers of the Indus system to the Indira Gandhi Canal and the Yamuna River.

  - Indus-Yamuna Link Canal (IYLC or IYL Canal or IY Link Canal): 200 km long canal, including 87 km link between Sutluj to Yamuna, will link the 3 western rivers - Indus, Jhelum, and Chenab - which were exclusively for the use by Pakistan under the India-Pakistan Indus Water Treaty (IWT) until the IWT was put in abeyance in early 2025 by India in the aftermath of 2025 Pahalgam attack, with the three eastern rivers - Ravi, Beas, and Sutlej - which were for the exclusive use of India under the IWT, and further west to Yamuna River.
    - Indus-Sutlej Link Canal (ISLC or ISL Canal or IS Link Canal), 113 km long canal component of the IYC Canal with 12 tunnels, will link the 3 western rivers - Indus, Jhelum, and Chenab, with the three eastern rivers - Ravi, Beas, and Sutlej, by linking 13 existing canals along the way - which are being upgraded, to the terminal point of this new link canal the Indira Gandhi Canal at Harike Barrage on Sutlej river. Beginning June 2025, the 113 km long link canal project will be completed within 3 years by July 2028. Water from this new link canal will then be redistributed to 3 states - Jammu and Kashmir, Punjab, Haryana, and Rajasthan - where the existing canal network is being upgraded and expanded. Pre-feasibility study for the new link canal began in June 2025.
  - Indus basin hydroelectric dam projects: Simultaneously, in 2025 the work on increasing the capacity of major dams in Indus basin, such as Uri, Dulhasti, Salal, Baglihar, Nimu Bajgo and Chutak is progressing rapidly, and the work on Kishanganga, Ratle, Pakal Dul and Tulbul dams will begin soon.

== Gallery ==
Displayed in the order of the sequential flow of the canal as it flows NE-SW.

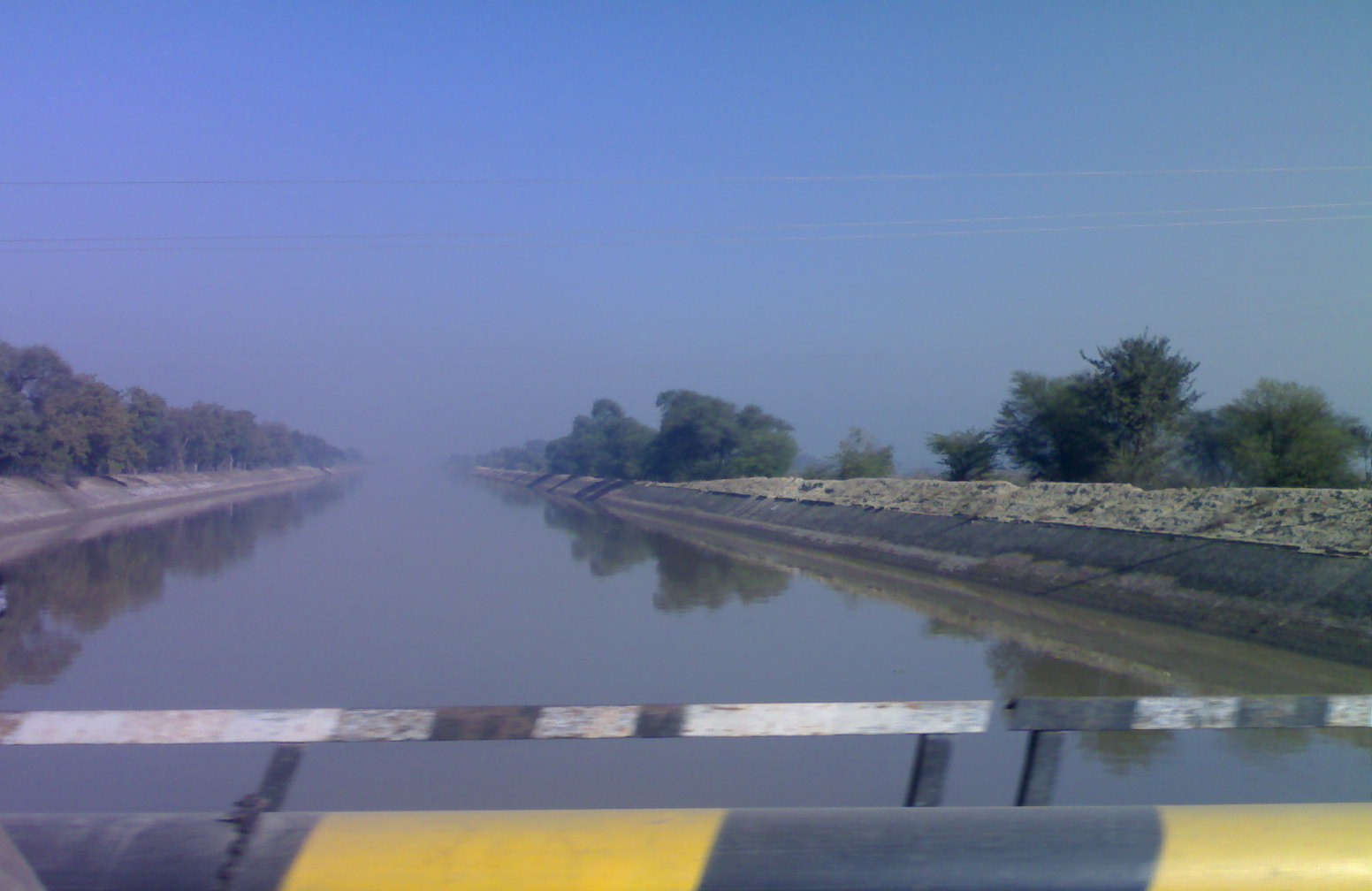
Indira Gandhi Canal near Giddarbaha town in Muktsar district of Punjab state

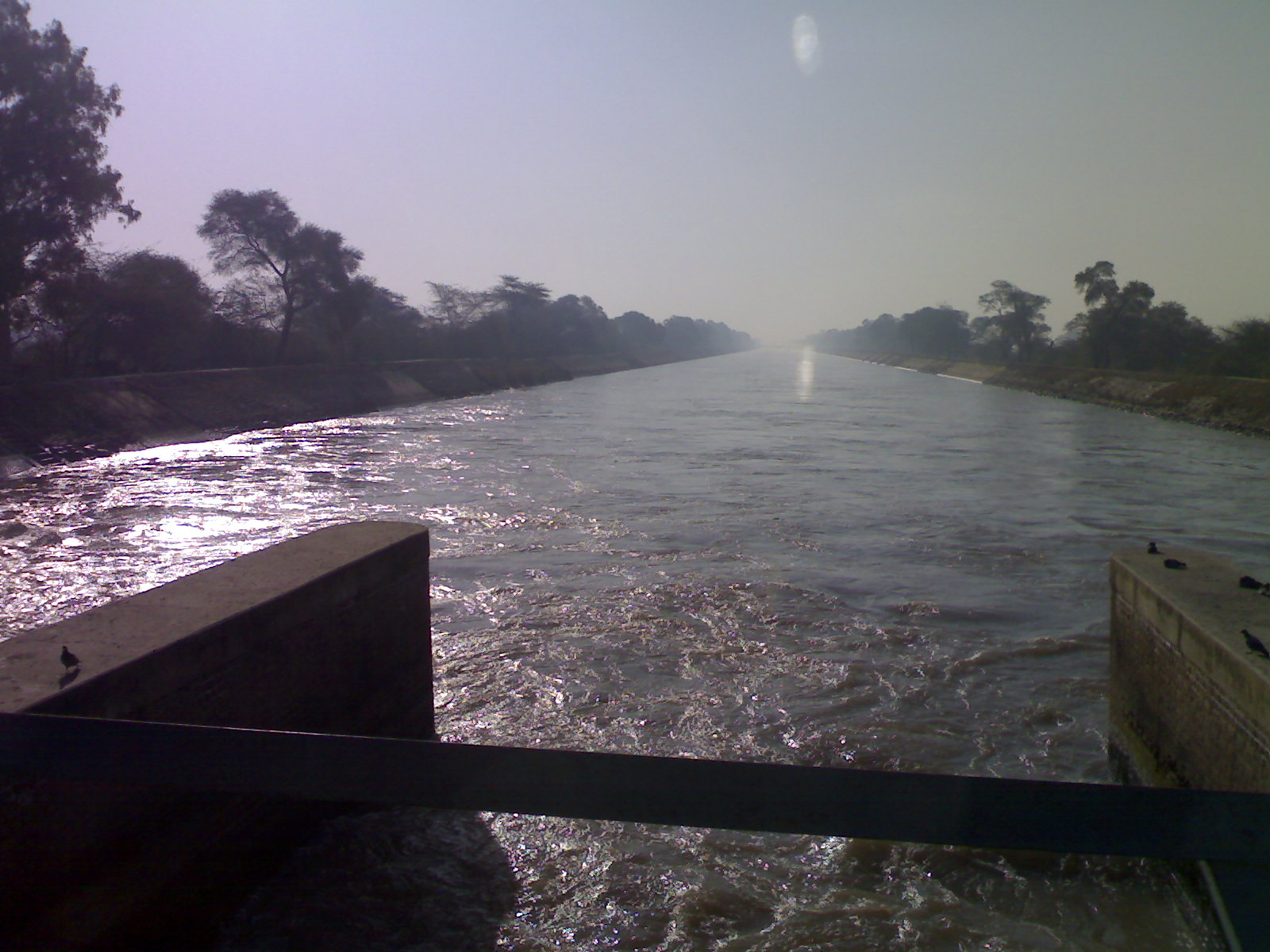
A bridge near Lohgarh village of Sirsa district in Haryana state of India, where Indira Gandhi Canal enters from Punjab into Haryana

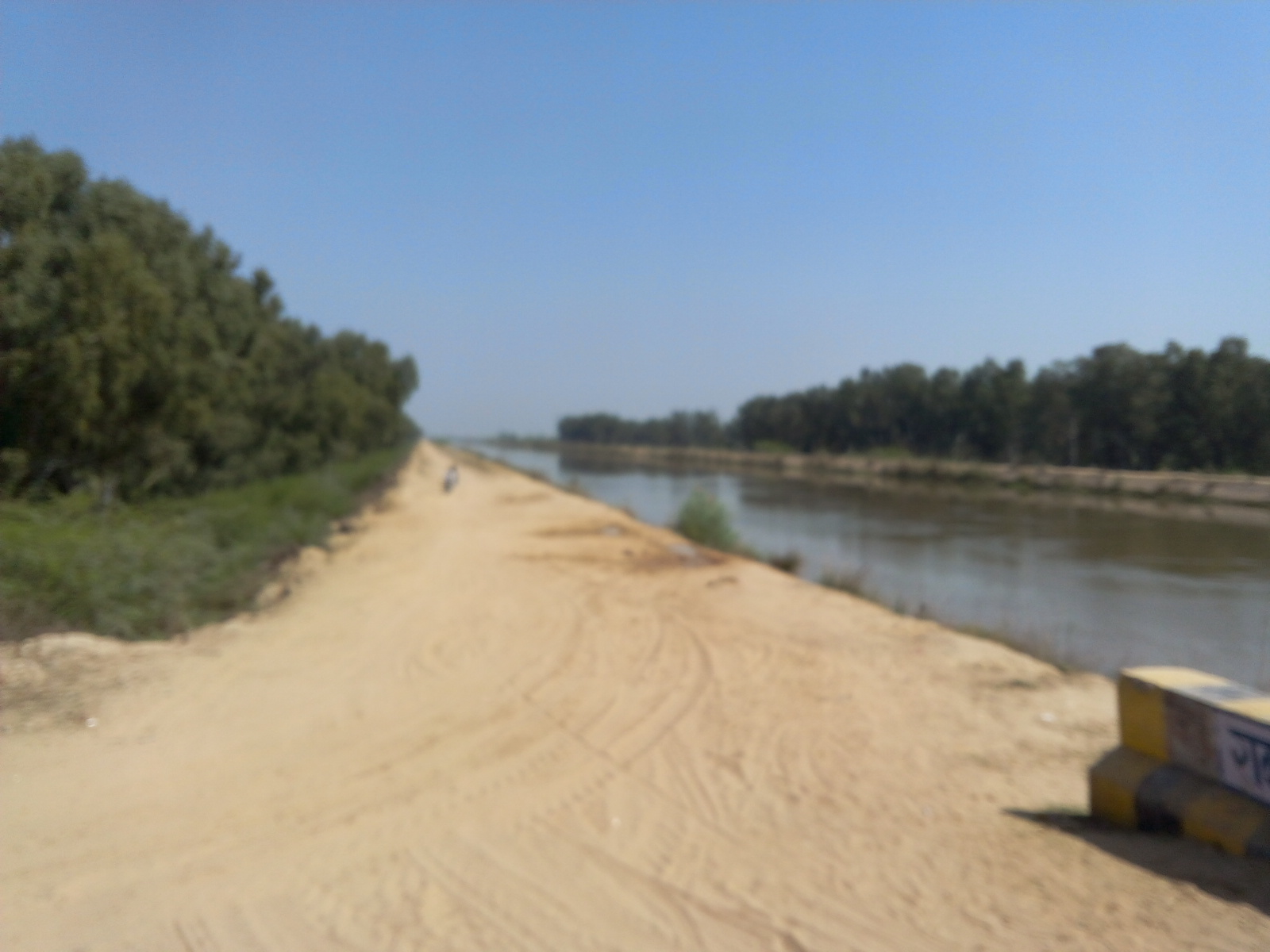
Indira Gandhi canal near Rawatsar in Hanumangarh district of Rajasthan state

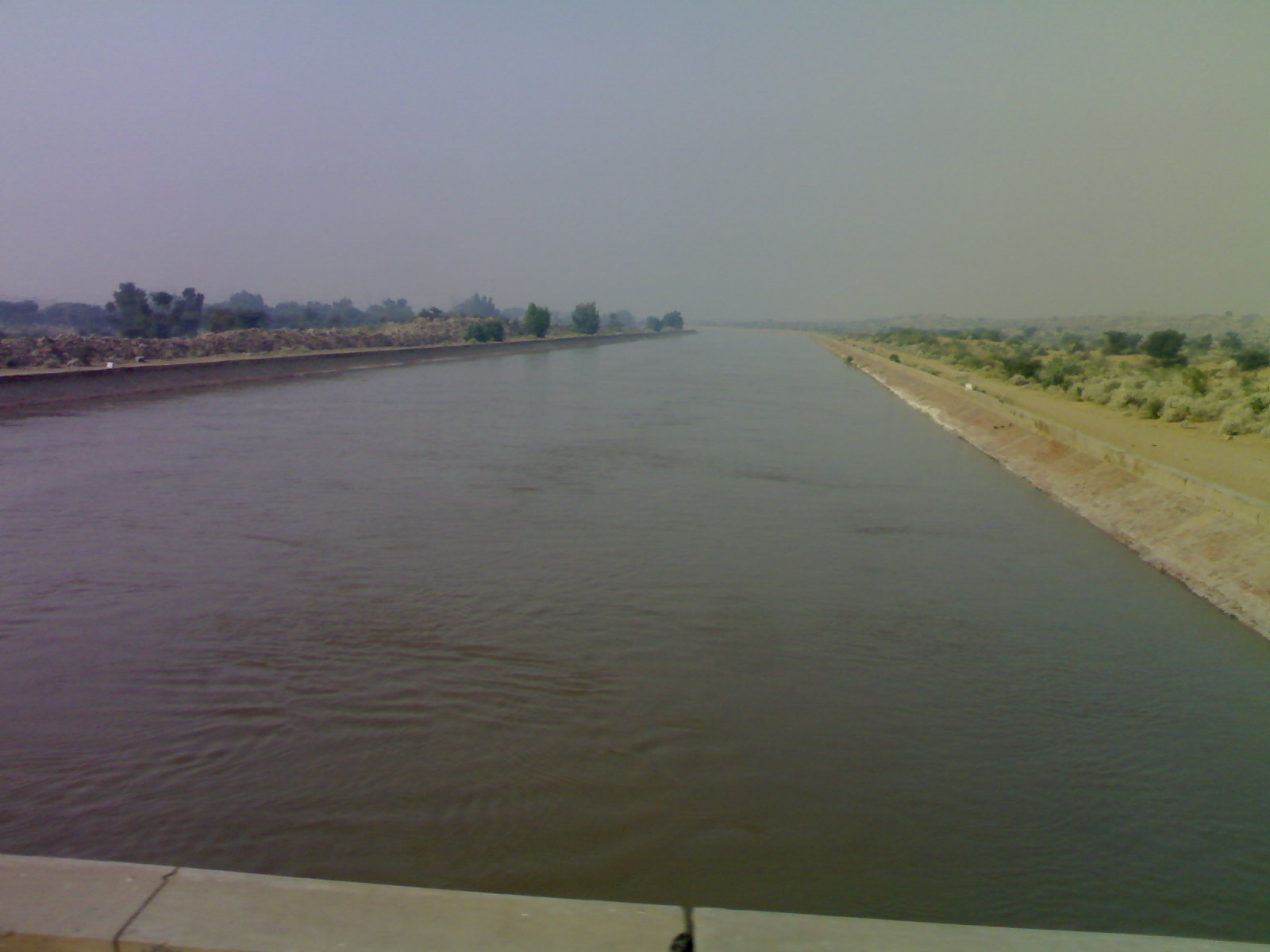
Indira Gandhi Canal passing through the Thar desert near Chhatargarh village of Bikaner district in Rajasthan

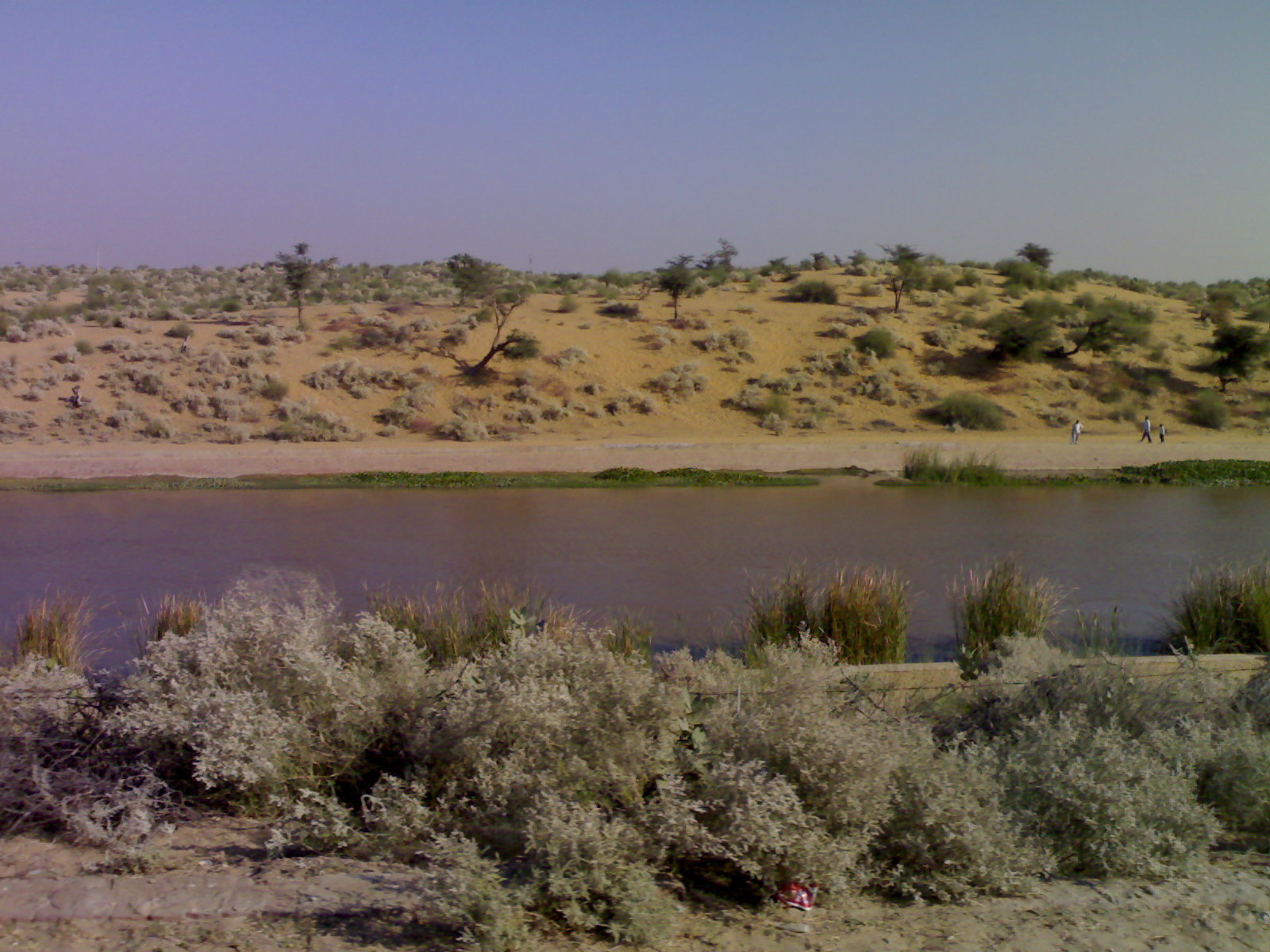
Indira Gandhi Canal flowing in the Thar desert near Sattasar village of Bikaner district in Rajasthan

== See also ==
- List of canals in India
  - Rajasthan
    - Ramjal Setu link project (ERCP)
    - Ganga Canal (Rajasthan) (Gang Nahar)
  - Indus Water Treaty (IWT), impacts water supply in Rajasthan
- List of rivers in India
  - List of rivers of Rajasthan
  - Rivers and dams of Jammu and Kashmir
  - Rigvedic rivers
- Ministry of Jal Shakti
  - Irrigation in India
  - river interlinking project
  - List of dams and reservoirs in India
  - List of megaprojects in India

== Sources ==
- Anon. 1998. Statistical Abstract Rajasthan. Directorate of Economic and Statistics, Rajasthan, Jaipur.
- Balak Ram, 1999. Report on Wastelands in Hanumangarh district, Rajasthan. CAZRI, Jodhpur.
- Karimkoshteh, M. H. 1995. Greening the Desert (Agro-Economic impact of IG canal). Renaissance Publication, New Delhi.
- Kavadia, P.S. 1991. Problem of waterlogging in Indira Gandhi Nahar Project and outline of Action Plan to tackle it.
- Singh, S. and Kar, A. 1997. Desertification Control - In the arid ecosystem of India for sustainable development. Agro-Botanical Publishers, Bikaner.
- Burdak, L. R. 1982. Recent advances in Desert Afforestation, Dehradun.
