= Jawahar Nagar, Jaisalmer =

Village in Jaisalmer, Rajasthan, India

Jawahar Nagar
- Village
- Location in Rajasthan, India Jawahar Nagar (India)
- Coordinates: 27.540195093978546°N 71.11412405416985°E
- Country: India
- State: Rajasthan
- District: Jaisalmer

Government
  - Type: Panchayati Raj (India)
  - Body: Gram Panchayat

Population (2011)
  - Total: 231

Languages: Rajasthani, Marwadi
  - Official: Hindi
- Time zone: UTC+5:30 (IST)
- PIN: 345033
- Vehicle registration: RJ- RJ15

Jawahar Nagar is a Gram Panchayat in Mohangarh Panchayat Samiti (Block) in Jaisalmer District, Rajasthan, India. It is located approximately 35 km from the Panchayat Samiti headquarters in Mohangarh. Jawahar Nagar is primarily known for its agricultural landscape, supported by a branch distributary of the Indira Gandhi Nahar Project. Mohangarh is the nearest town to Jawahar Nagar, located around 35 km away.

The total area of Jawahar Nagar is 847 hectares, as per data from 2009. The village has a population of 231 people living in 50 households. Of the total population, 129 are male and 102 are female. Jawahar Nagar has a lower literacy rate compared to Rajasthan. In 2011, the literacy rate in Jawahar Nagar was 62.80%, while the average for Rajasthan was 66.11%. Male literacy in the village stands at 69.83%, while female literacy is 53.85%.
