= Kanwar Sen =

Indian civil engineer

Kanwar Sain, also known as Rai Bahadur Kanwar Sain Gupta OBE (1899–1989) was a civil engineer from Haryana state in India. He was the chief engineer in the Bikaner state who came up with idea of Rajasthan Canal. He also successfully implemented the Ganga canal project which expanded into Indira Gandhi Canal. He was considered a leading irrigation engineer of his time.

He was born in 1899 in Tohana district Fatehabad (Haryana). He was educated at D.A.V. College, Lahore. He graduated as a civil engineer with honors from Thomason College of Civil Engineering, Roorkee (now, IIT Roorkee) in 1927. He was awarded the Padma Bhushan in 1956. His memoir, 'Reminiscences of an Engineer' was published in 1978.

He was chairman of Central Water and Power Commission, Ministry of Irrigation and Power, Government of India. Kanwar Sain and Karpov (1967) presented enveloping curves for Indian rivers.

== Career and recognition ==
Kanwar Sain contributed to the design and establishment of the Central Water and Power Commission. Sain's passionate involvement with his work - especially in saving Dibrugarh from floods and during the mishap at the Bhakra Dam, endeared him to his colleagues, both in India and abroad. He was associated with the Mekong Development Project for nine years as an UN expert. For nearly half a century, Sain was involved with river projects and development of water resources both in India and abroad. He was closely connected with major projects-from the Damodar Valley to the Rajasthan Canal, from Hirakud Dam, to the Narmada River Project.

Sain was recognized with several honors, including the Order of the British Empire, O.B.E., and the Padma Bhushan.

He was offered the Order of the Elephant by the Government of Thailand, but could not accept it, as he was serving with the United Nations. He was elected President of Central Board of Irrigation and Power in 1953, Vice President of International Commission on Irrigation and Drainage 1954 and President of the Institute of Engineers India in 1956.

He was awarded Honorary Life Membership by the American Society of Civil Engineers and an Honorary Life Fellowship by the Institution of Engineers India. His alma mater, the University of Roorkee (now Indian Institute of Technology, Roorkee), awarded him an honorary doctorate of engineering.
