= Gadisar Lake =

Lake in Jaisalmer, Rajasthan, India

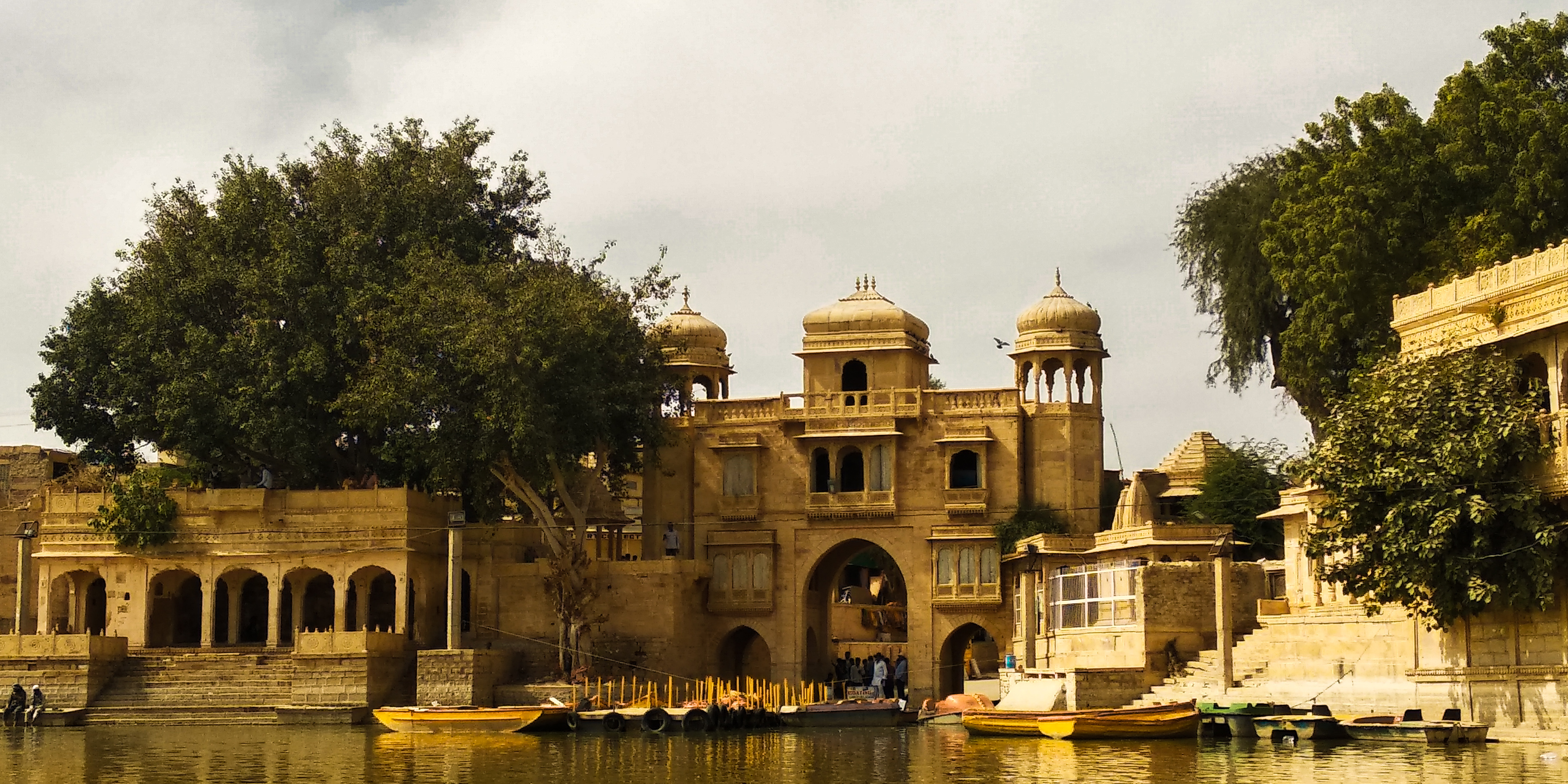
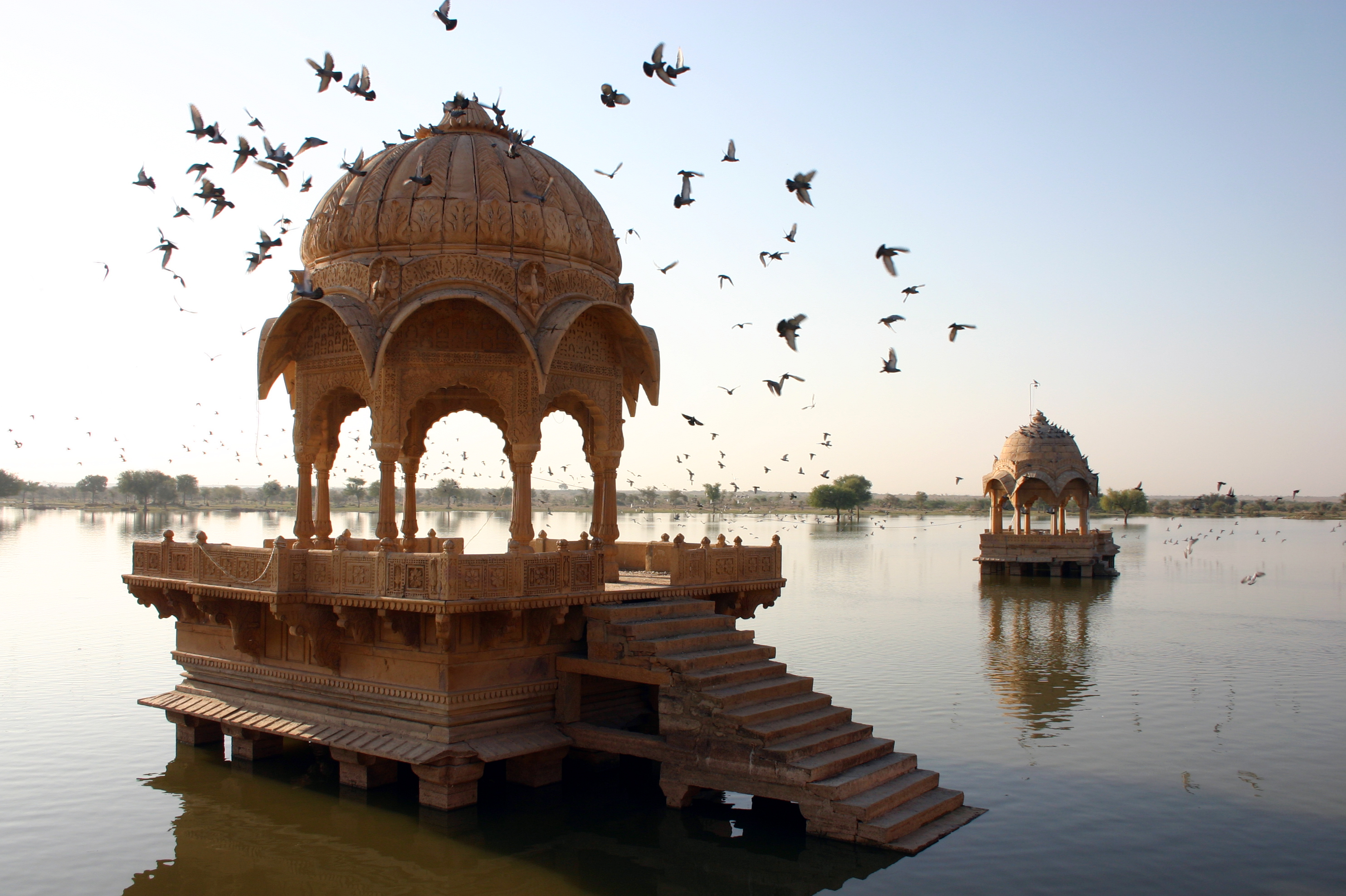
- Top: Main entrance of Gadisar Lake; Bottom: Gadisar Lake

- Location in Rajasthan
- Interactive map of Gadisar Lake
- Location: Jaisalmer, Rajasthan, India
- Coordinates: 26.908°N 70.922°E
- Type: Artificial lake
- Basin countries: India
- Settlements: Jaisalmer

Gadisar Lake (also called Gadsisar Lake) is an artificial lake in Jaisalmer, Rajasthan, India. It was built by the founder of Jaisalmer, Rawal Jaisal Bhati in 1156 AD and later rebuilt by his successor Rawal Gadsi Bhati around 1367 AD. The lake is located about 1.5 km (0.93 mi) from Jaisalmer Fort. It is said that this lake once provided water to the entire city.

== Etymology ==
The name Gadisar is derived from "Gadsi," referring to Rawal Gadsi Bhati, the ruler of Jaisalmer who rebuilt the lake in the 14th century. The suffix sar (Sanskrit: सरः, saraḥ) means "lake" or "waterbody" in Sanskrit.

== History ==
Gadisar lake is an artificial lake. It is located in the southern part of the city of Jaisalmer. This lake was built by the founder King of Jaisalmer Rawal Jaisal. Due to this, it was also called Jaisalasar Lake earlier. At that time it was the only water source of the Jaisalmer region. Later the lake was rebuilt by Gadsi Singh and after that it was renamed as Gadisar Lake. The lake also has many chhatris and shrines of Hindu gods and goddesses.

== Climate ==
Gadisar Lake

Climate chart (precipitation, max. and min. temperature)
J	F	M	A	M	J	J	A	S	O	N	D
1 27 8	10 33 12	7 38 17	19 45 23	16 44 28	17 42 30	56 37 25	87 35 23	82 41 26	1 42 22	1 35 15	1 28 9
- █ Average max. and min. temperatures in °C
- █ Precipitation totals in mm
Imperial conversion
J	F	M	A	M	J	J	A	S	O	N	D
0 81 46	0.4 91 54	0.3 100 63	0.7 113 73	0.6 111 82	0.7 108 86	2.2 99 77	3.4 95 73	3.2 106 79	0 108 72	0 95 59	0 82 48
- █ Average max. and min. temperatures in °F
- █ Precipitation totals in inches

== Photo gallery ==
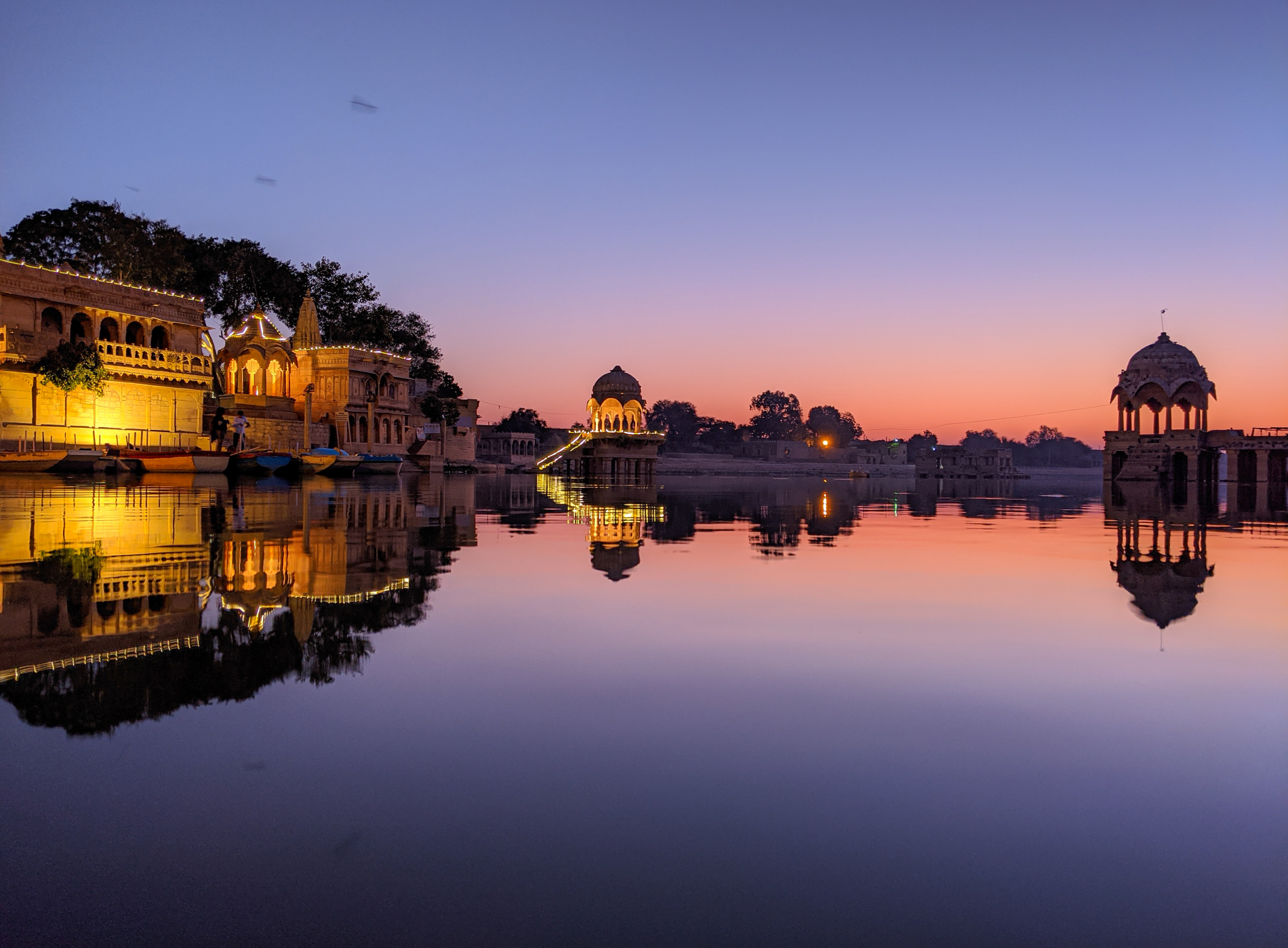
Early morning view of the Gadisar Lake

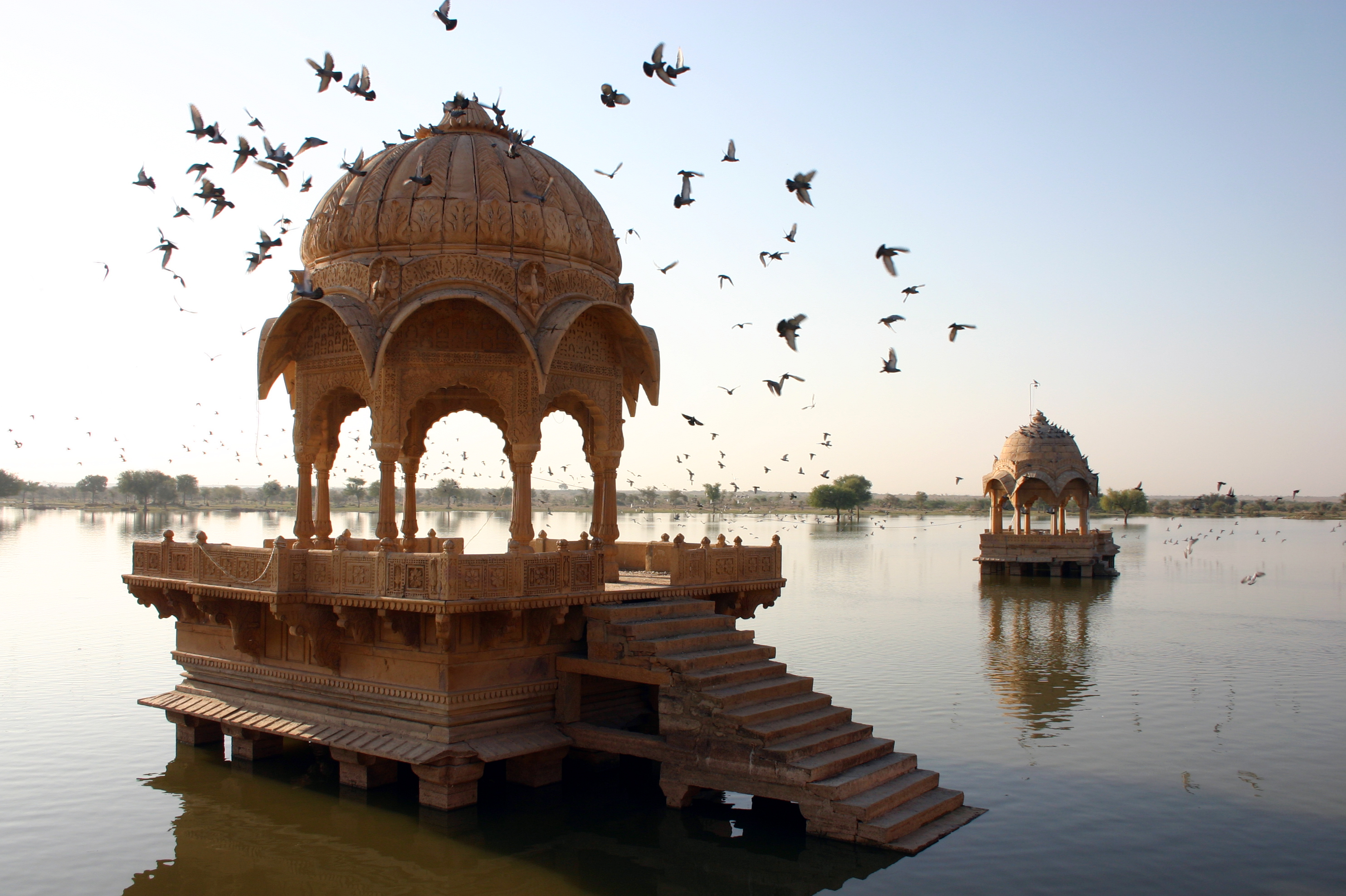
Chhatris in Gadisar Lake

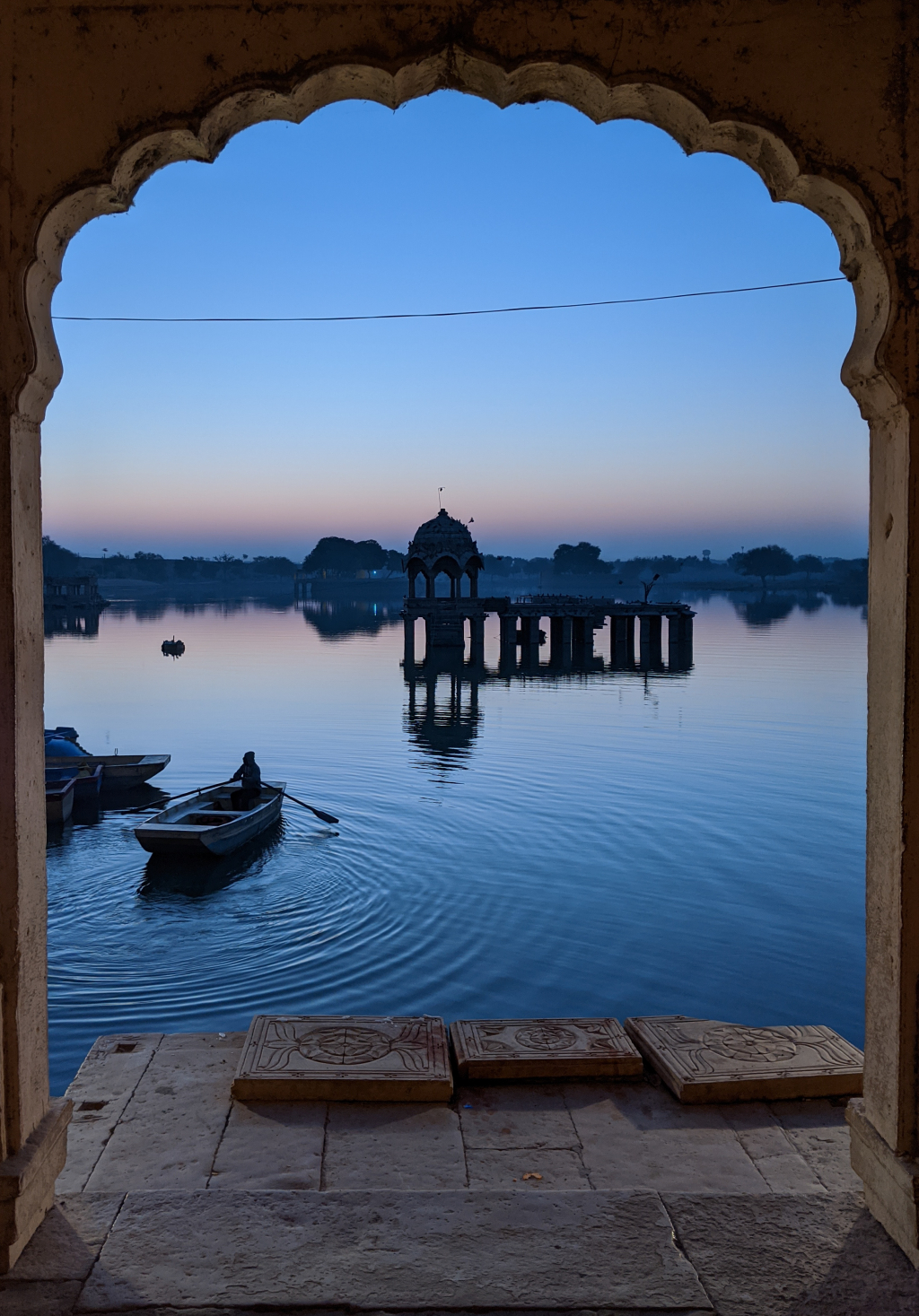
Chhatri in Gadisar Lake

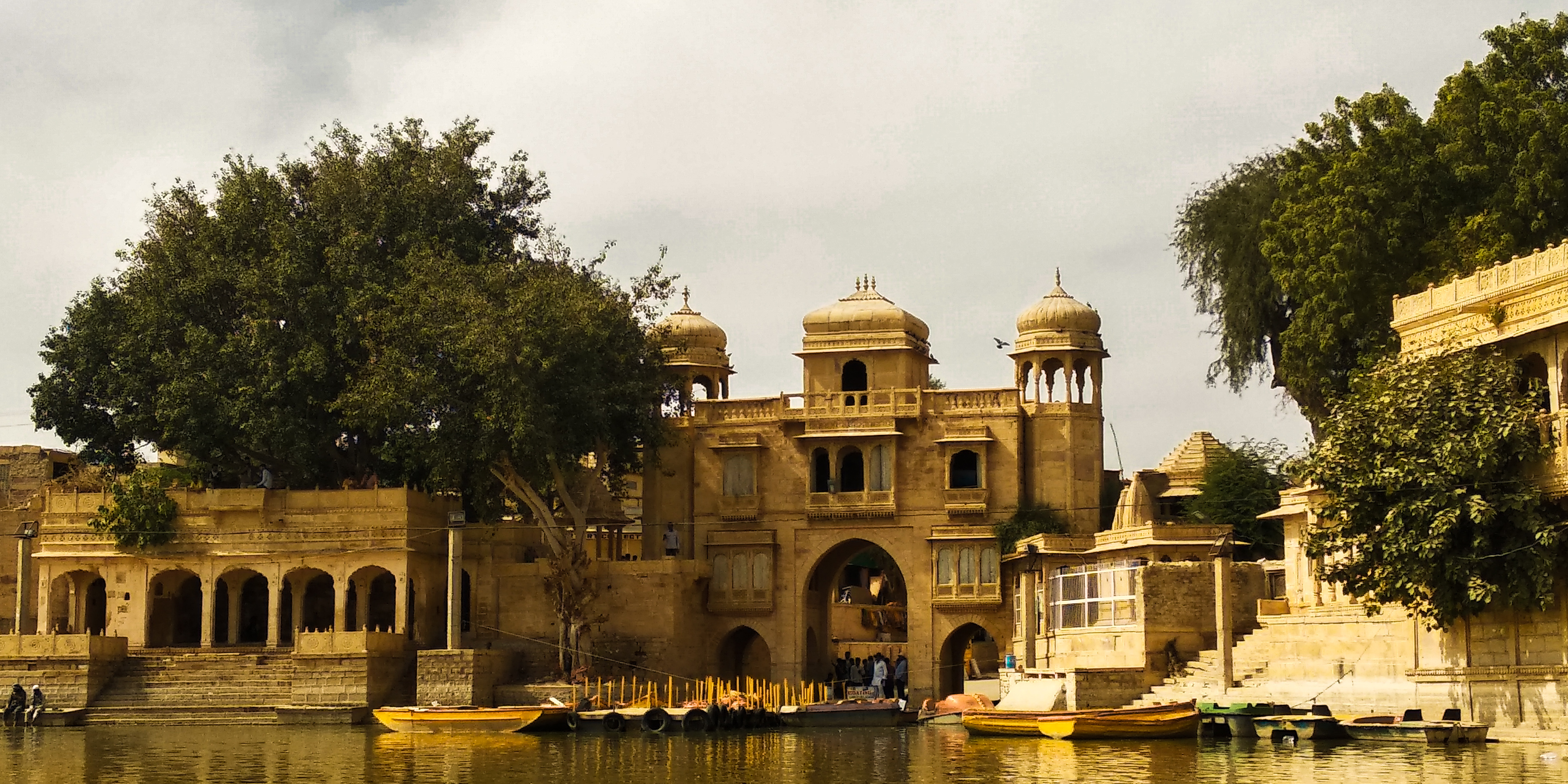
Main entrance of Gadisar Lake

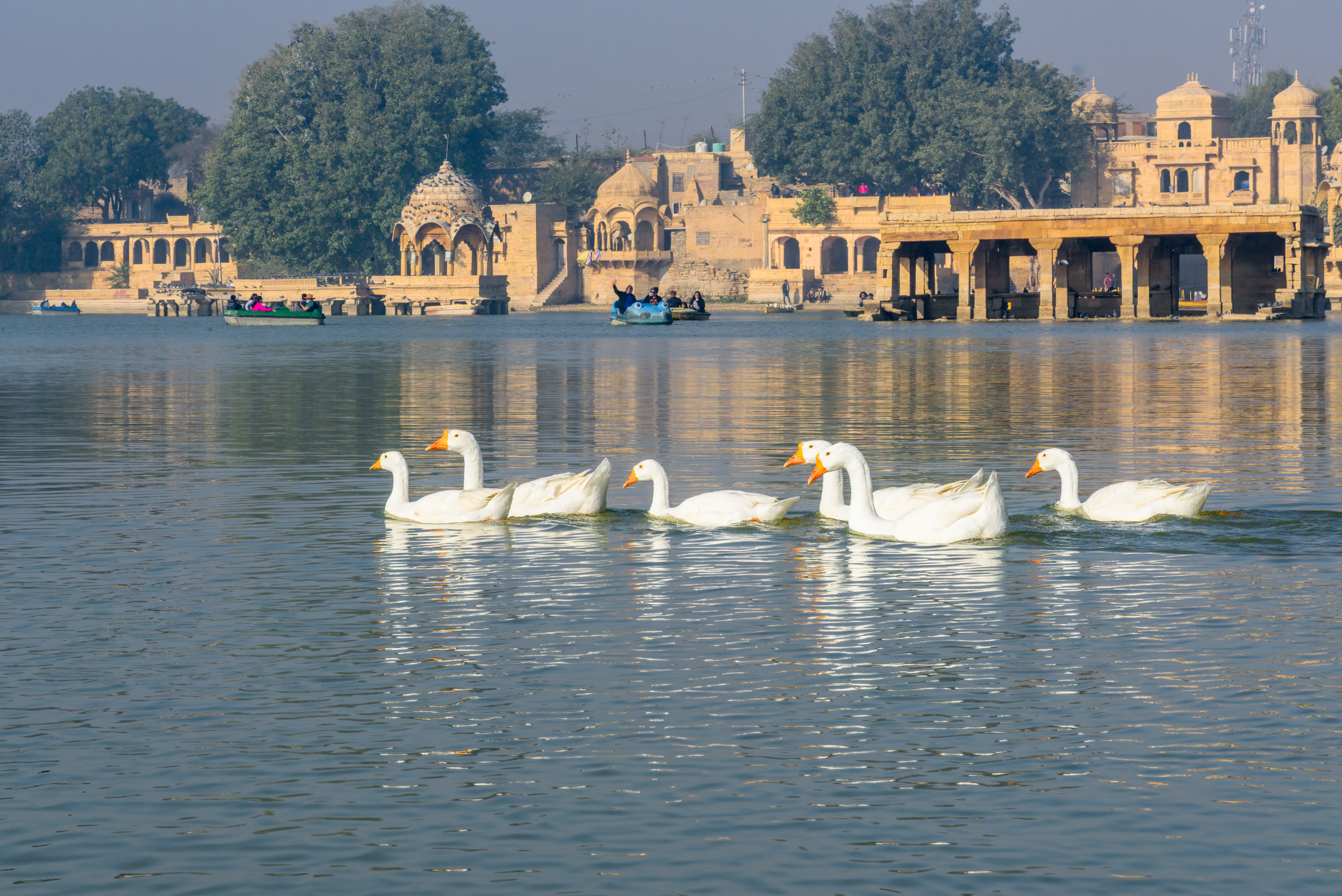
Ducks at Gadisar Lake

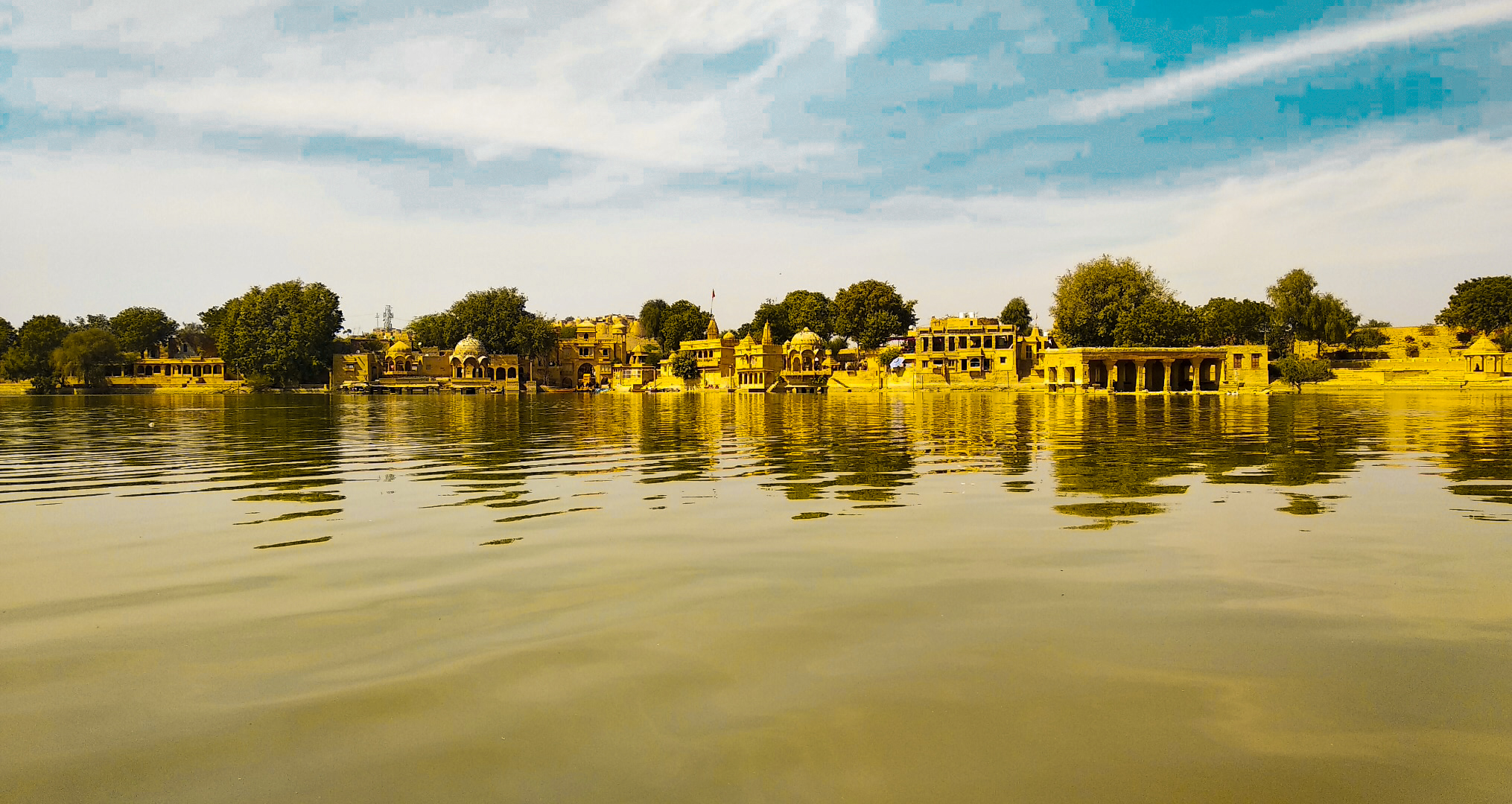
Panoramic view of Gadisar Lake

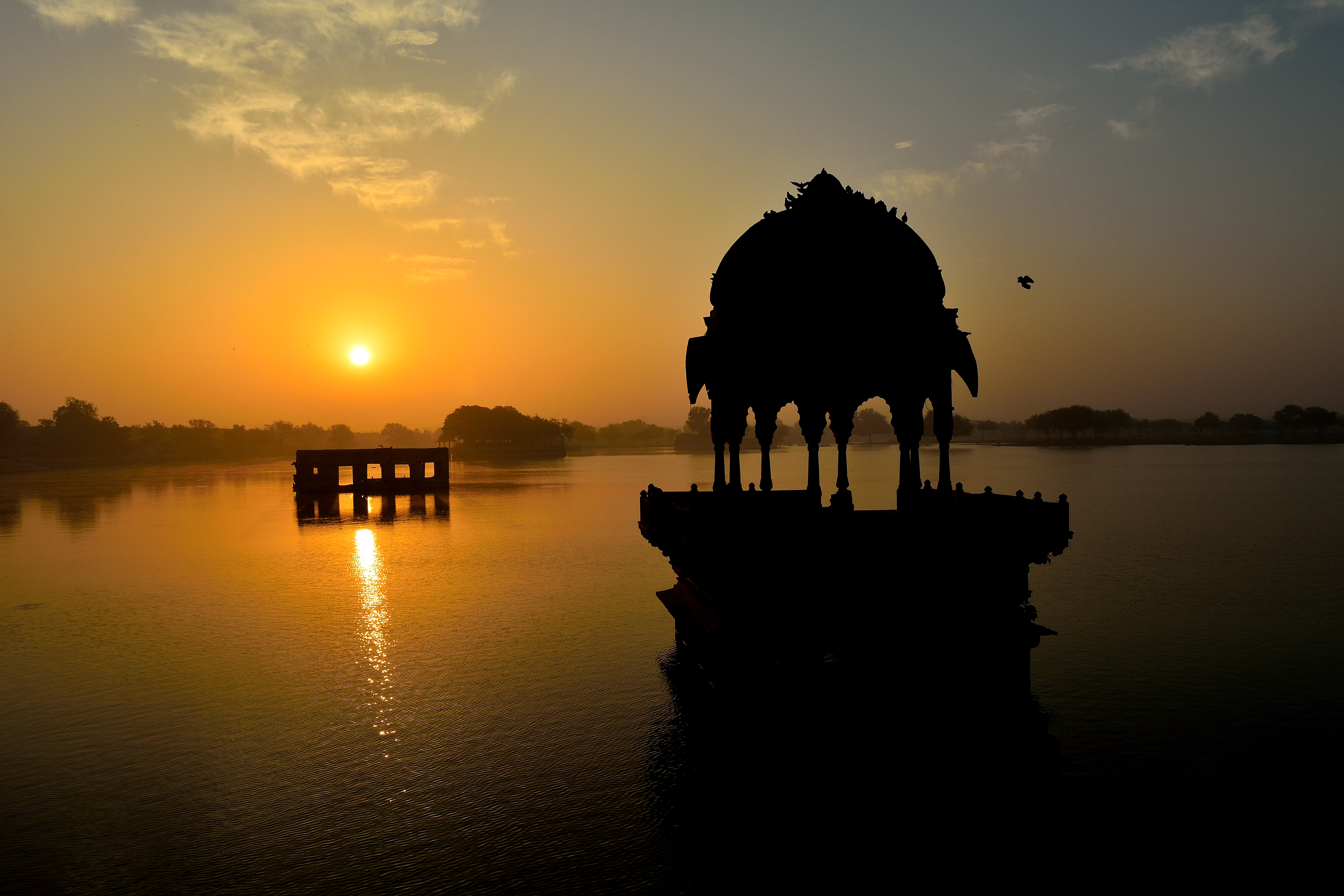
Early morning view of a chhatri in Gadisar Lake
