= Raiya Tunda =

- village
- Location in Rajasthan, India Raiya Tunda (India)
- Coordinates: 28°47′15.4″N 74°47′59.8″E
- Country: India
- State: Rajasthan
- District: Churu

Languages
  - Local: Bagri
- Time zone: UTC+5:30 (IST)
- ISO 3166 code: RJ-IN
- Vehicle registration: RJ
- Climate: Arid (Köppen)

Raiya Tunda is a gram panchayat in Taranagar sub district of Churu district in the Indian state of Rajasthan. The village has been chosen as Adarash Gram by jaynarayan poonia the member of parliament of Taranagar sub district. Raiya Tunda is 62 km away from its district headquarter Churu.

== Transportation ==
Raiya Tunda is well connected by roads to its nearest cities Taranagar (36 km), Nohar (45 km), Bhadra (52 km) and Sardarshahar (60 km). The nearest railway station is Nohar. Raiya Tunda is about 350 km away from New Delhi. The nearest airport to Raiya Tunda is Bathinda (160 km).

== Language and culture ==
The people of Raiya Tunda speak Bagri language and the Bagri culture is dominant here.hariyanvy and bagri mix language.

== Education ==
There is one government senior high secondary school, two government primary school and two private schools in the village. Most of the students of the village go to sahwa for study. Most of the old aged people are uneducated.

== Economy ==
Most of the village economy based on farming. Indra Gandhi lift canal passes through the village. Most of the fields are irrigated, but sandy dunes can still be seen in the village.

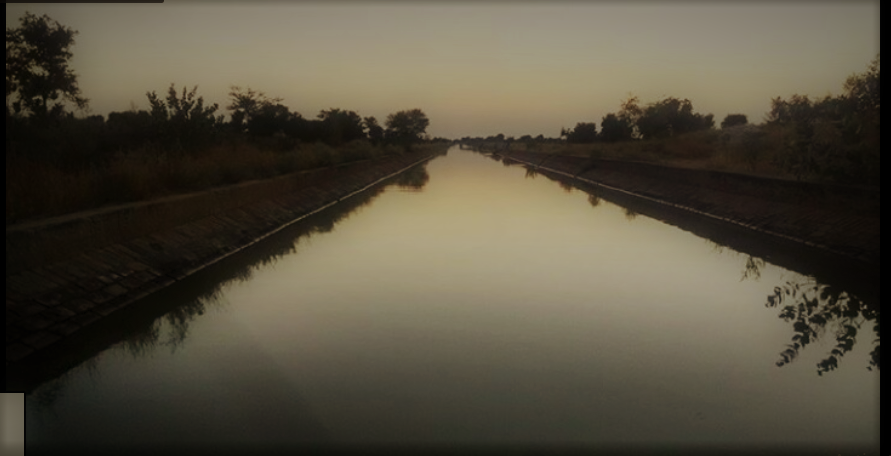
IGNP passing through Raiyatunda

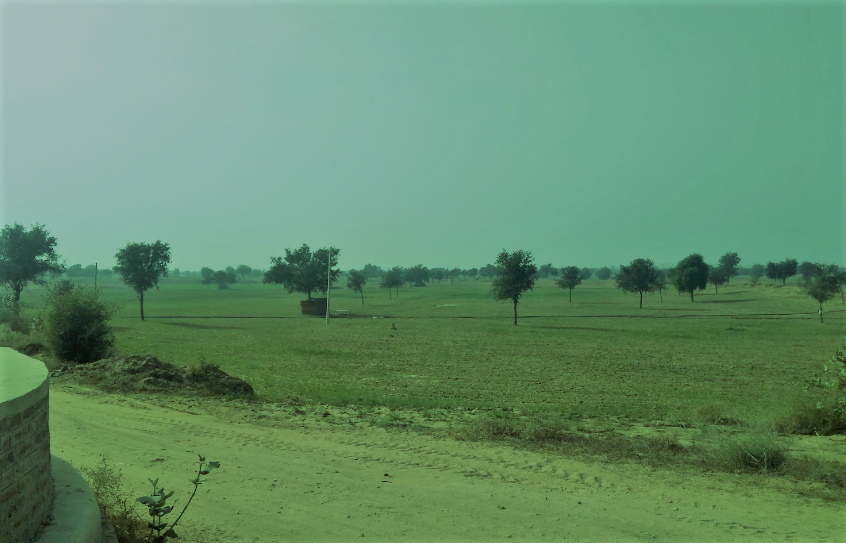
Field view of Raiya Tunda in summer

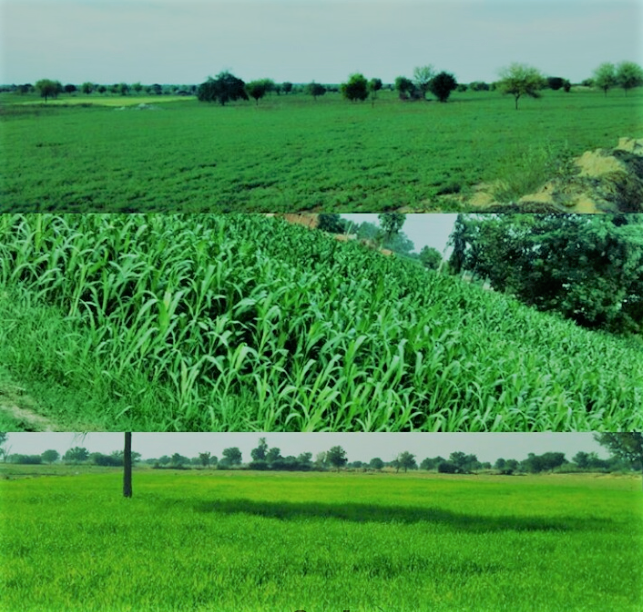
fields view in Raiya Tunda
