= Birbal Singh =

Indian freedom fighter from Raisinghnagar, India

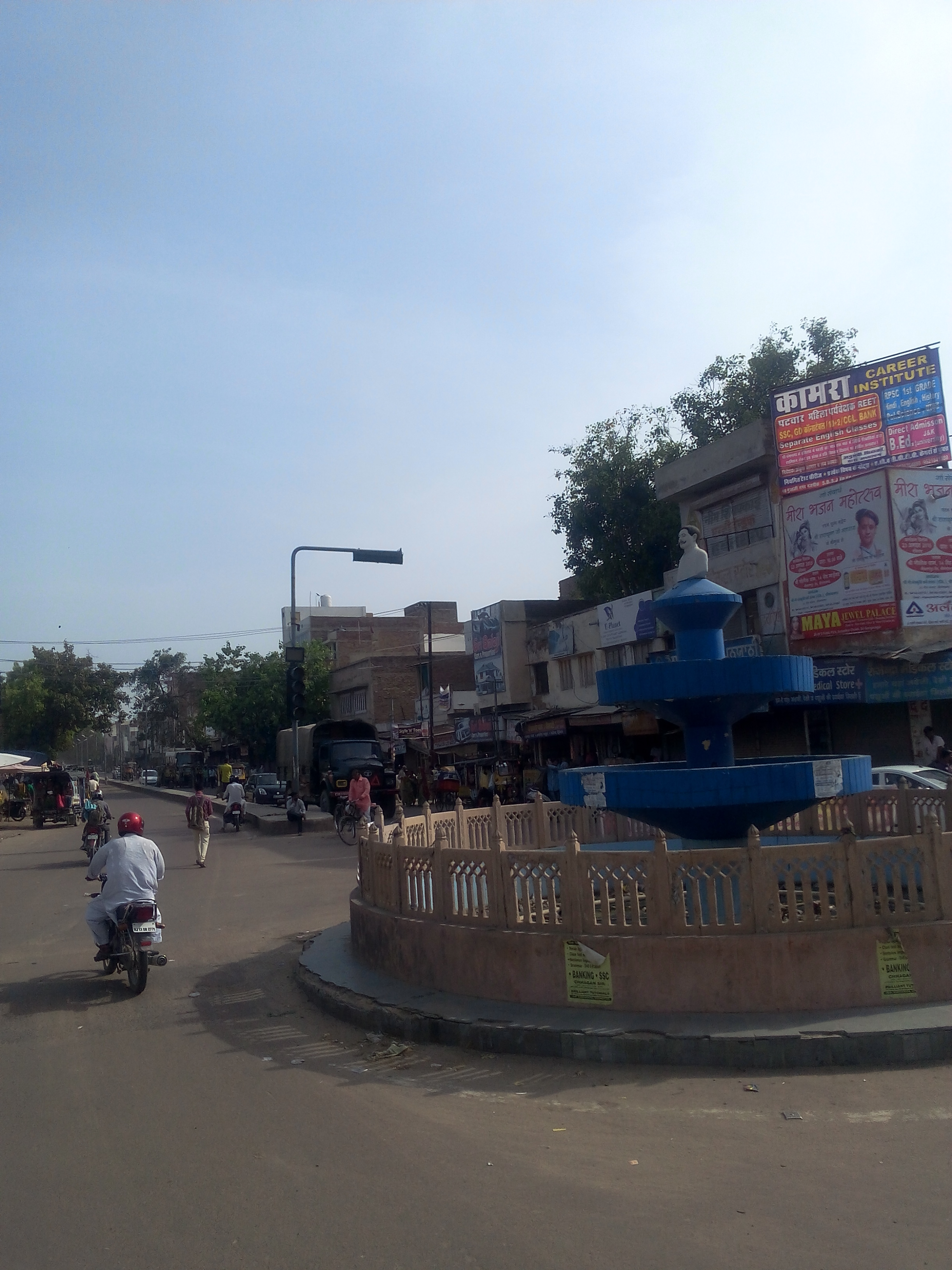
Birbal chowk or square in Sri Ganganagar, India in remembrance of Birbal.

Birbal Singh was an Indian freedom fighter from Raisinghnagar, India. He died in firing by police of Bikaner princely state in 1946.

== Early life ==
His full name was Birbal Singh Dhalia. His father's name was Salagram. His family business was purchasing cotton. Raisinghnagar (then Panwarsar) was a small city in the princely state of Bikaner. This princely state was also ally with the British, who were ruling British India. Birbal was a member of a patriotic organisation named Bikaner Rajya Prishad. Sardul Singh was the ruler of Bikaner. Birbal raised a voice for rights and freedom against the princely state.

== Procession and death ==
On 30 June 1946 a large procession was organised by freedom activists in Raisinghnagar. They were raising slogans for freedom with tricolour, the Indian national flag. Then the police opened firing and Birbal was killed 1 July 1946 death in police firing.
