= Ramgarh, Jaisalmer =

Ramgarh
- Village
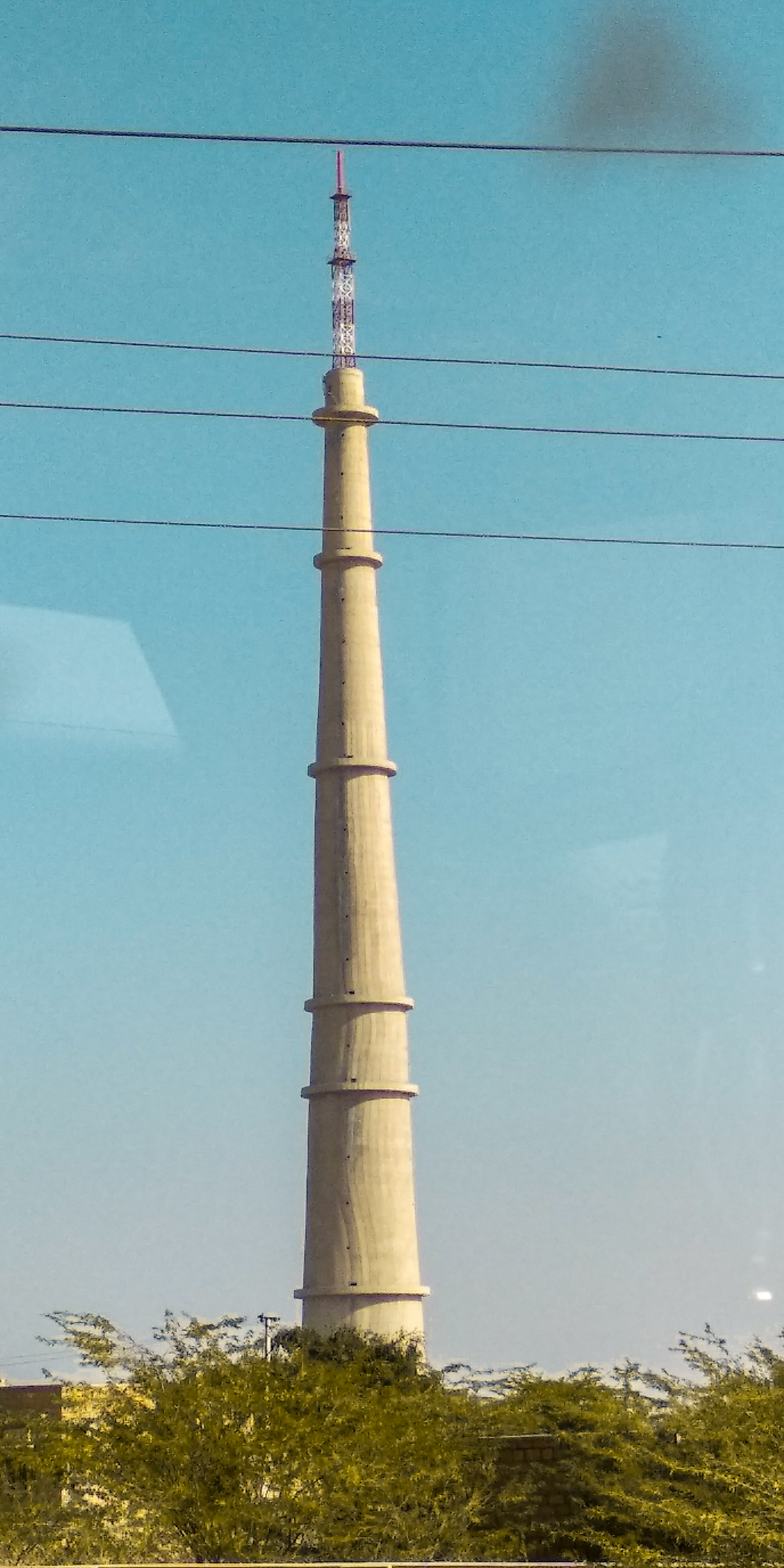
- TV Tower located in Ramgarh village

- Location in Rajasthan, India
- Coordinates: 27.3753109°N 70.4870796°E
- Country: India
- State: Rajasthan
- District: Jaisalmer
- Tehsil: Jaisalamer tehsil

Population (2011)
  - Total: 8,222
- Time zone: UTC+5:30 (IST)
- PIN: 345022

Ramgarh is a village located in Jaisalmer district of Rajasthan in India. It comes under Jaisalamer tehsil. Ramgarh is 52 km west of the district headquarters Jaisalmer.

The PIN code of Ramgarh village is 345022.

Ramgarh also has the largest TV tower in Rajasthan which was constructed in 1993. Its length is 300 m (984.3 ft).

== Public Demographic ==
According to the 2011 census Ramgarh has population of 832222.
