= Mohangarh, Jaisalmer =

Village in Jaisalmer, Rajasthan, India

Mohangarh
- Village
- Location in Rajasthan, India Mohangarh (India)
- Coordinates: 27.286943°N 71.242502°E
- Country: India
- State: Rajasthan
- District: Jaisalmer

Government
  - Type: Panchayati Raj (India)
  - Body: Panchayat Samiti

Population (2011)
  - Total: 9,928

Languages: Marwadi, Hindi, Sindhi
  - Official: Hindi
- Time zone: UTC+5:30 (IST)
- PIN: 345033
- Vehicle registration: RJ- RJ15

Mohangarh is a Panchayat Samiti (Block) in the Jaisalmer Tehsil of Jaisalmer District, Rajasthan, India. It is located 60 km away from the district headquarters, Jaisalmer. Mohangarh is primarily known for its agricultural landscape, supported by the Rajasthan Canal. Jaisalmer is the nearest town to Mohangarh which is approximately 60 km away.

== Demographics ==
The total geographical area of Mohangarh village is 72,115 hectares, with a population of 9,928 people. The village has approximately 1,833 households. Of the total population, 5,404 are male and 4,524 are female, constituting 54.43% and 45.57%, respectively. Mohangarh has a lower literacy rate compared to Rajasthan. In 2011, the literacy rate in Mohangarh was 57.60%, while Rajasthan's average was 66.11%. Male literacy in the village stands at 71.49%, whereas female literacy is 40.85%.

== Notable persons ==
- Sona Ram Choudhary, former Indian Army officer and parliamentarian
