= List of tourist attractions in Jaipur =

This is a list of attractions in Jaipur city in Rajasthan state in India.

== Palaces and forts ==
- Amer Fort
- Jaigarh Fort
- Nahargarh Fort
- Hawa Mahal
- Jal Mahal
- City Palace
- Diggi Palace
- Rambagh Palace
- Man Sagar Lake

== Temples ==
- Digamber Jain temple of Sanghiji, Sanganer
- Govind Dev Ji Temple
- Birla Mandir
- Garh Ganesh Temple
- Galtaji
- Shri Radha Gopinath Ji Temple
- Tarkeshwar Nath Temple
- Shila Devi temple

== Gardens ==
- City Park, Jaipur
- Kanak Vrindavan
- Central Park
- Jawahar Circle
- Ram Niwas Garden
- Sisodia Rani Garden and Palace

== Museums ==
- Albert Hall Museum
- City Palace

== Festivals ==
- Elephant Festival
- Gangaur
- Teej

== Others ==
- Jaipur Zoo
- Jantar Mantar
- Jawahar Kala Kendra
- Raj Mandir Cinema
- Ramgarh Lake
- Sambhar Salt Lake

== Gallery ==
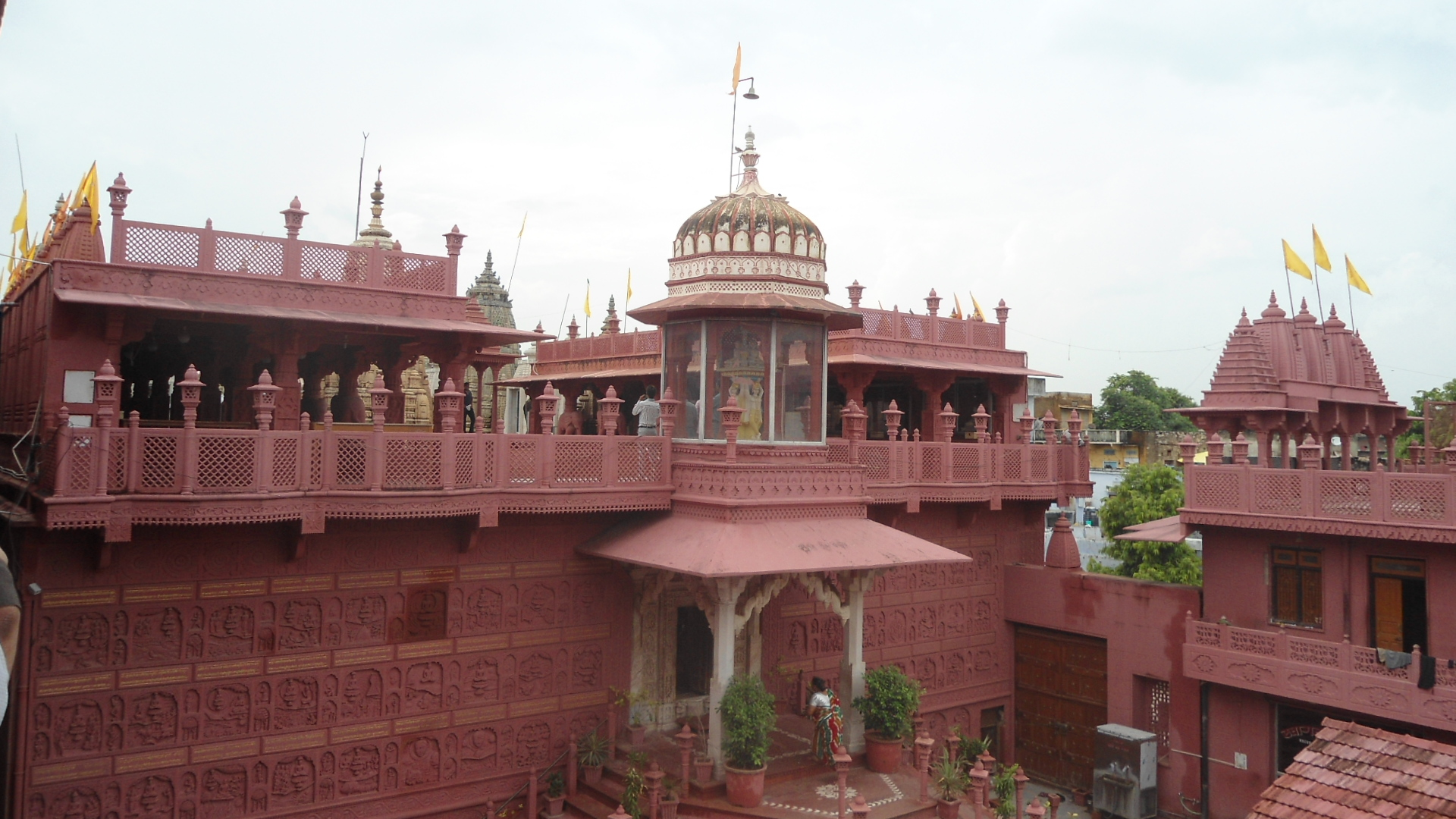
Digamber Jain temple of Sanghiji, Sanganer

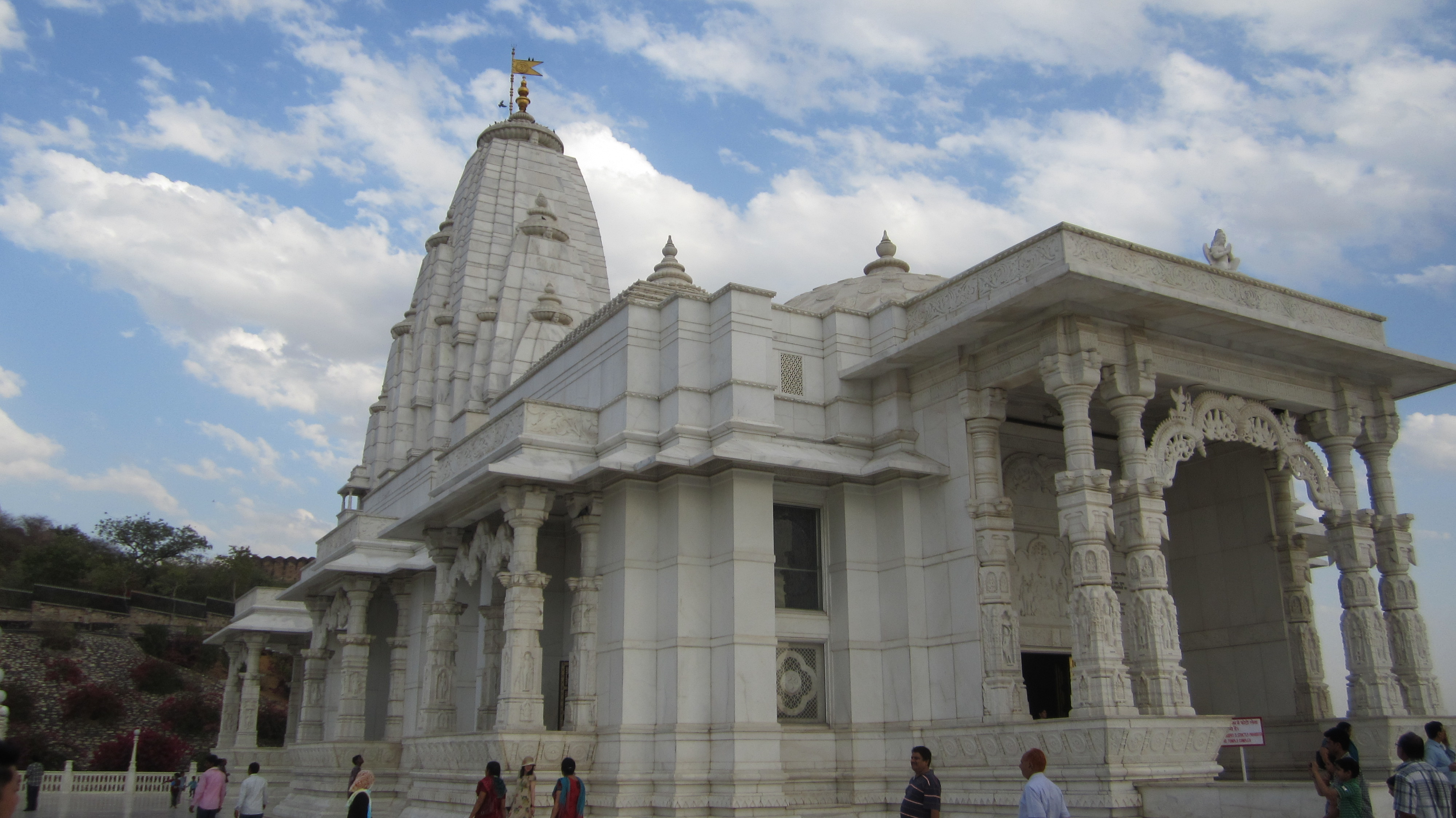
Birla Mandir

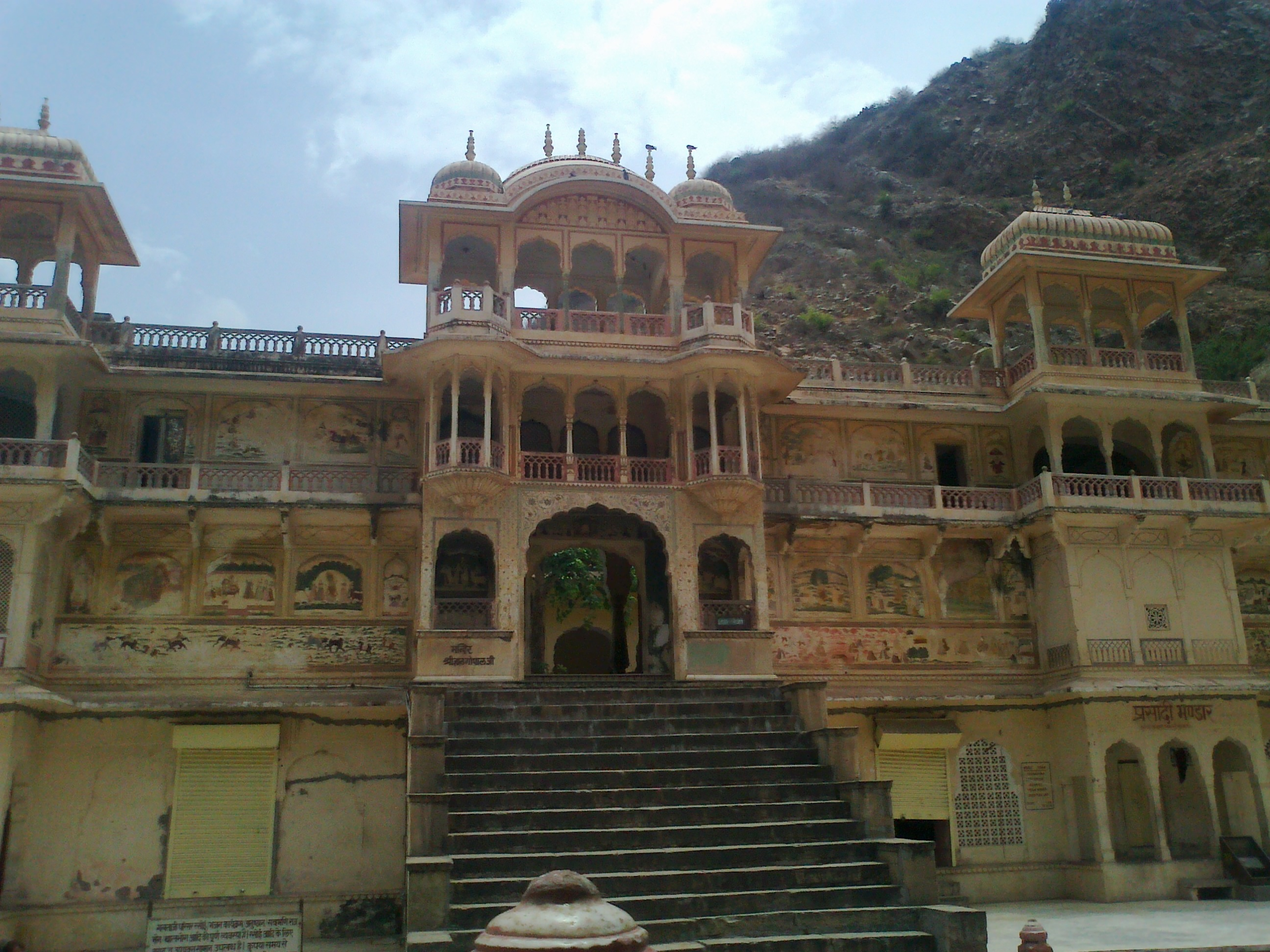
Galtaji Temple

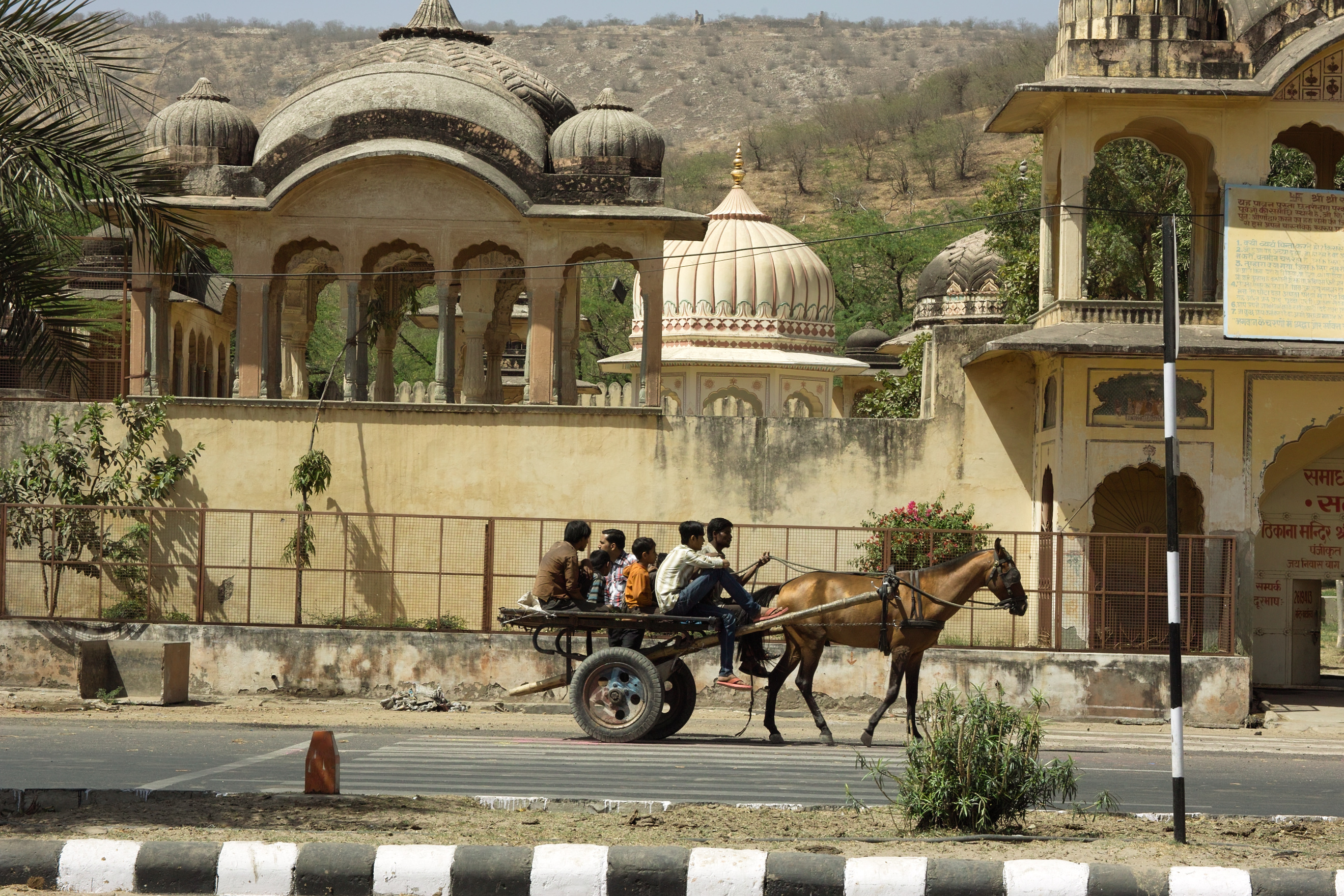
Kanak Vrindavan

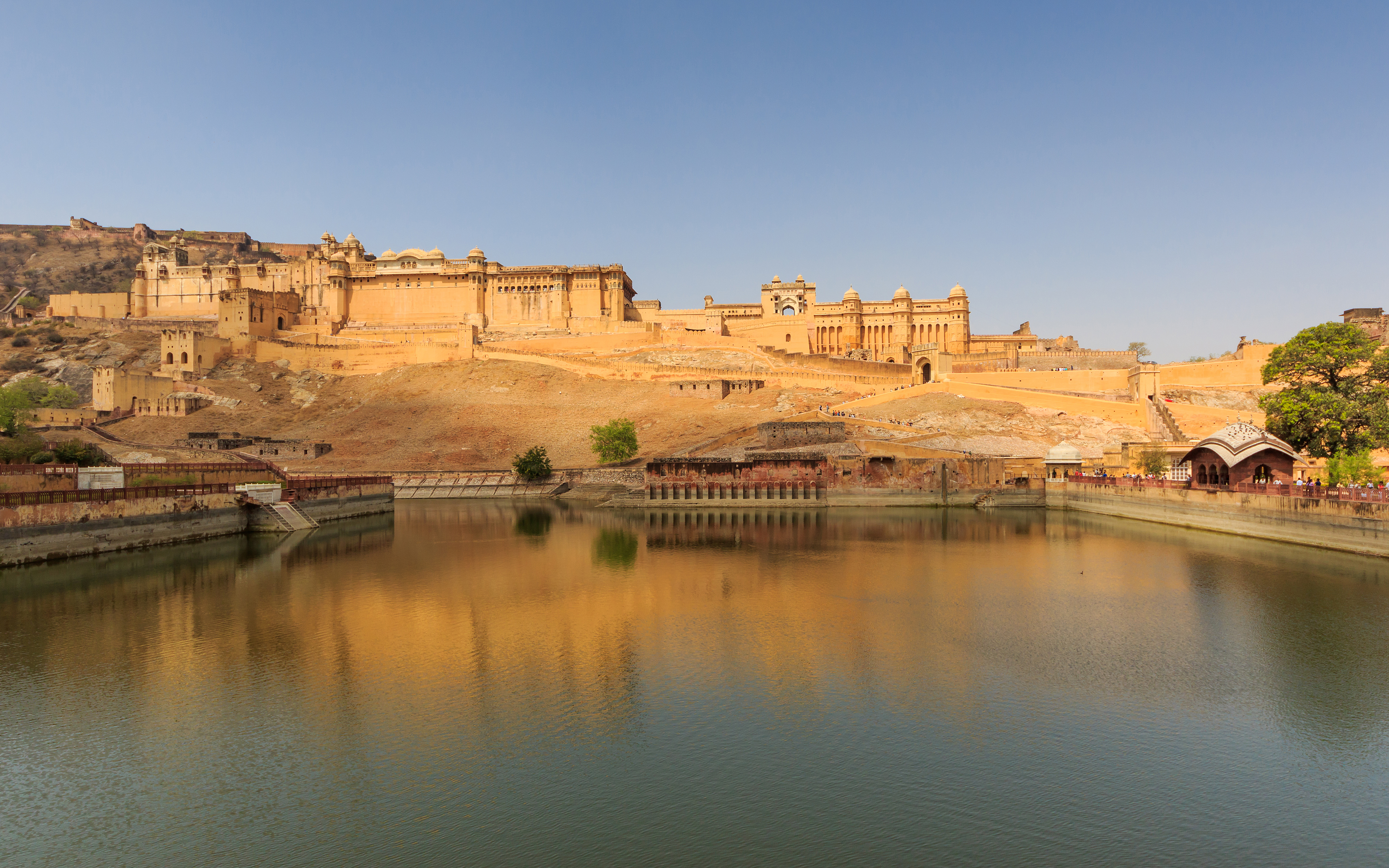
Amer Fort

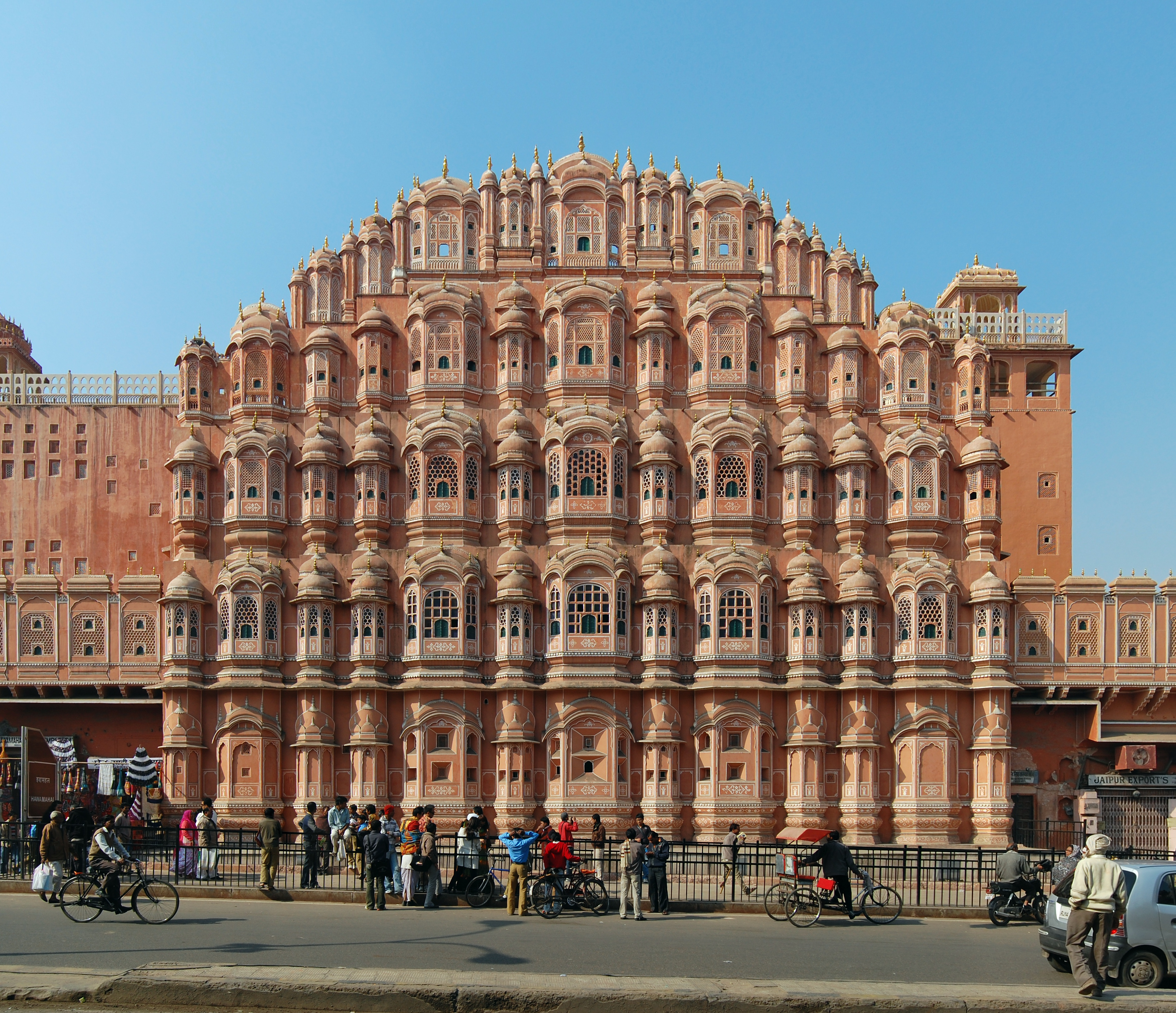
Hawa Mahal

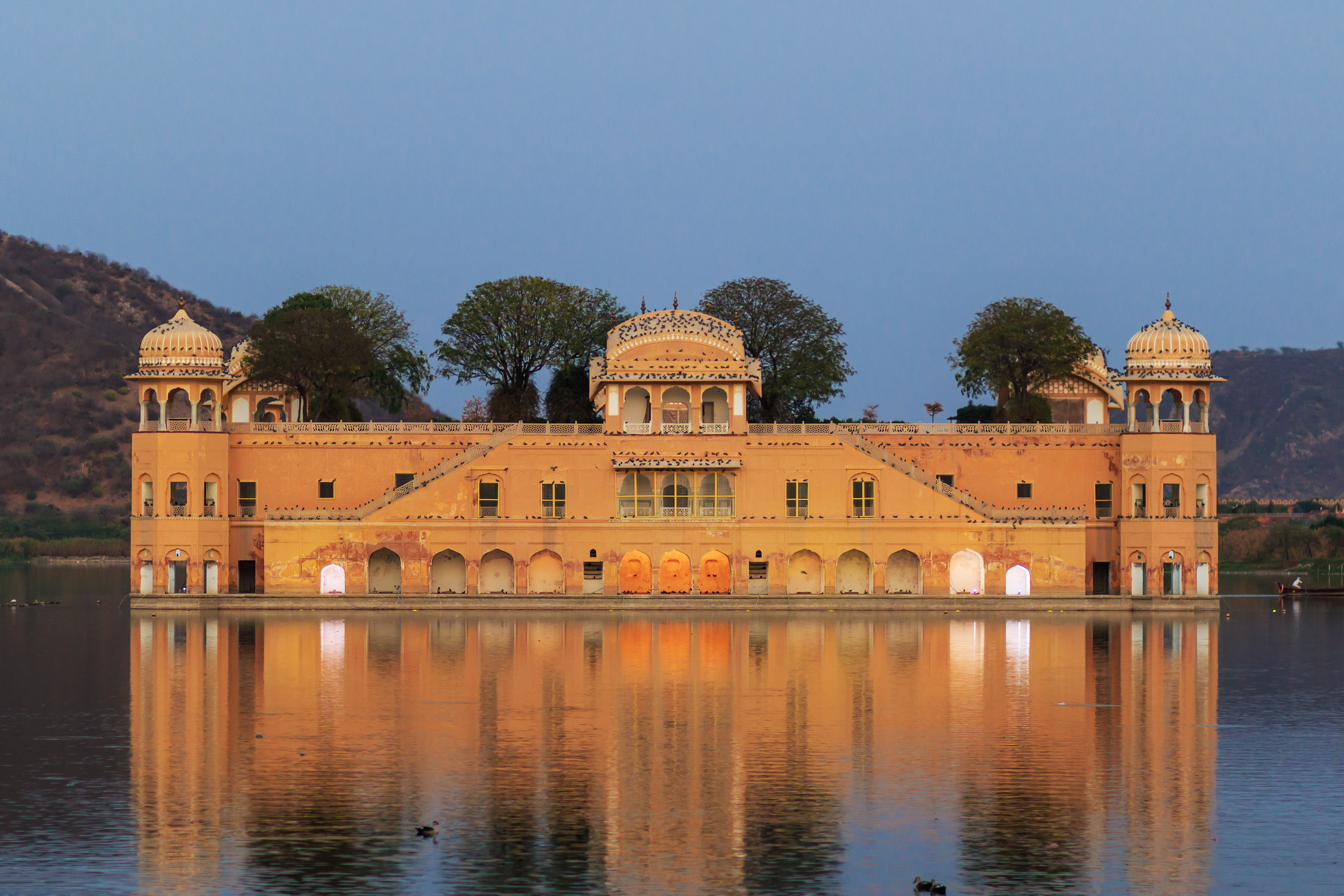
Jal Mahal

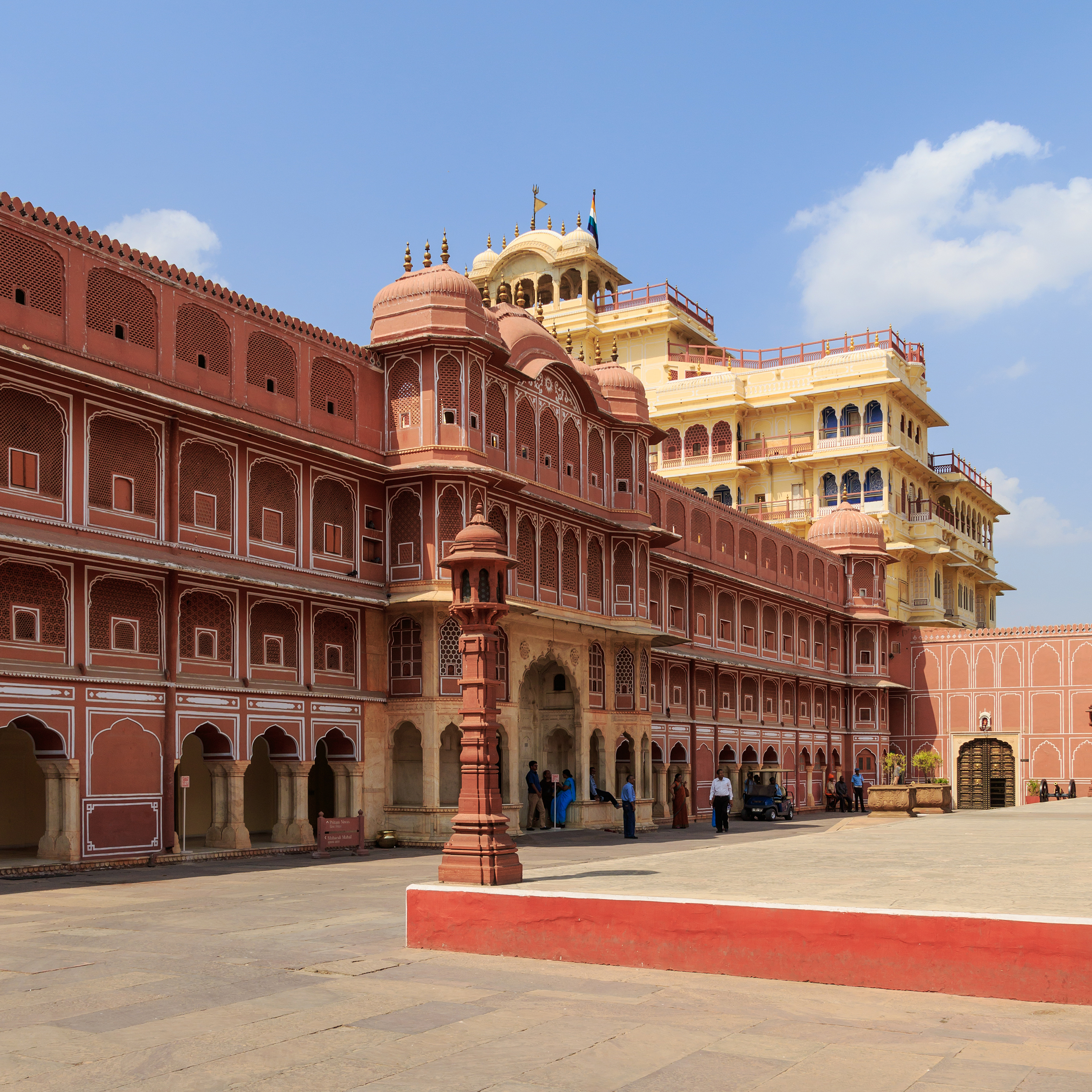
City Palace

== See also ==
- Tourism in Rajasthan
- Tourism in India
