= North West Frontier (film) =

- UK quad theatrical release poster
- Directed by: J. Lee Thompson
- Written by: Robin Estridge; Frank S. Nugent
- Story by: Patrick Ford; Will Price
- Produced by: Marcel Hellman
- Starring: Kenneth More; Lauren Bacall; Herbert Lom; Wilfrid Hyde-White; I. S. Johar
- Cinematography: Geoffrey Unsworth
- Edited by: Frederick Wilson
- Music by: Mischa Spoliansky
- Production company: Rank Organisation Film Productions
- Distributed by: The Rank Organisation
- Release date: 25 October 1959
- Running time: 129 minutes
- Country: United Kingdom
- Language: English
- Budget: £500,000

North West Frontier (USA: Flame Over India; Australia: Empress of India) is a 1959 British Eastmancolor adventure film starring Kenneth More, Lauren Bacall, Herbert Lom, Wilfrid Hyde-White and I. S. Johar. The CinemaScope film was produced by Marcel Hellman and directed by J. Lee Thompson. It was a commercial success at the British box-office in 1959. The film's success led to J. Lee Thompson beginning his American career as a director.

The film is set in the North West Frontier Province of British India (now within modern Pakistan). It explores the ethnic tensions within British India after Muslim rebels attack a fortress and kill a Hindu maharajah.

== Plot ==
In 1905 on the North West Frontier of British India, a Hindu Maharajah asks British Army Captain Scott to take his young son, Prince Kishan, to the safety of the Governor's residence in Haserabad due to a Muslim uprising in his province. Accompanying them is the prince's governess, an American widow named Mrs. Wyatt. They leave shortly before the rebels storm the palace and kill the prince's father.

On arrival at Haserabad, Captain Scott sees that many local Hindus and Europeans are leaving on the last train to Kalapur. The Muslim rebels soon close in and take control of the outer wall and gate beside the railway yard. The British governor tells Scott that he must take the young prince to Kalapur for his safety. In the railyard, the British captain discovers the Empress of India, an old engine with carriage cared for by its driver Gupta.

Early the next morning, Captain Scott quietly loads the passengers onto the old train. They include Mrs. Wyatt, Prince Kishan, arms dealer Mr. Peters, British ex-pat Mr. Bridie, Lady Wyndham (the governor's wife), two British Indian Army NCOs, and Dutch journalist Mr. Peter van Leyden - or so it is believed at first; van Leyden is later discovered in reality to be a half-Dutch, half-Indonesian Muslim, with aspirations for an Islamic India, facts important to the plot. The Empress quietly freewheels down a gradient and out of the yard, but unexpectedly sounds her whistle, alerting the rebels, so Gupta engages the steam, crashing through the outer gate.

Later that morning, the train encounters a refugee train seen in the beginning of the story; everyone on board has been massacred by the rebels. Despite being told not to by Captain Scott, Mrs. Wyatt leaves the Empress and finds one survivor, a baby concealed by his mother's body.

The next morning, the train must stop because a portion of the track has been blown up. Mrs. Wyatt spots the signaling flashes of a heliograph atop a mountain summit, and everyone quickly realises that the Muslim rebels are waiting in the surrounding mountains. With track repairs barely finished by the occupants, the train gets away under a hail of rebel gunfire; Gupta is wounded but survives.

Later that day, while stopping to refill the engine's water tank, Scott walks into the pump house to find Van Leyden allowing Prince Kishan to stand dangerously close to the pump's rapidly spinning flywheel. During the night, Mr. Van Leyden again, in a sinister fashion, approaches the prince only to notice Lady Wyndham watching him.

The train reaches a bomb-damaged viaduct/bridge, although the rails remain largely intact. All the passengers carefully traverse a rail on the bridge's damaged section to alleviate extra weight on the train that will follow them. Again, Van Leyden's behaviour nearly results in the prince's death by letting him fall from the bridge. Captain Scott accuses Van Leyden of trying to kill the prince, and he places the reporter under arrest. After that, Captain Scott, under Gupta's guidance, carefully maneuvers the train across the broken bridge section.

Later, while going through a tunnel, Van Leyden uses the opportunity to overpower his guard. He uses a Maxim machine gun to hold the passengers at bay. It is now that he declares his loyalty to the Muslim cause. He is unable to kill Prince Kishnan because the boy is forward with Captain Scott in the locomotive's cab. Scott returns to the carriage with the young prince after spotting more rebel heliograph signals, but they are saved when Van Leyden is knocked off balance by a kick from Mr. Bridie. Scott pursues him onto the carriage roof but it is Mrs. Wyatt who shoots and kills Van Leyden just as he is about to kill Scott. The Muslim rebels catch up with the train on horseback but have to stop their attack when the Empress enters a two-mile-long hillside tunnel. On the other side, the train reaches the safety of Kalapur. At the station, young Prince Kishan is met by his Hindu entourage, while Gupta is taken to hospital, and Lady Wyndham is informed that her husband, the governor, is safe. On learning Prince Kishan may yet fight the British, as his father instructed him, Scott quotes Kipling ("Be thankful you're livin', and trust to your luck, And march to your front like a soldier") before he and Mrs. Wyatt leave together.

== Cast ==
- Kenneth More as Capt. William Charles Willoughby Scott
- Lauren Bacall as Catherine Wyatt
- Herbert Lom as Peter van Leyden
- Wilfrid Hyde-White as Mr. Bridie
- I. S. Johar as Gupta, the driver
- Ursula Jeans as Lady Windham
- Eugene Deckers as Peters
- Ian Hunter as Sir John Windham
- Jack Gwillim as Brigadier Ames
- Govind Raja Ross as Prince Kishan
- Basil Hoskins as A.D.C.
- S. M. Asgaralli as Havildar (1st Indian Soldier)
- S. S. Chowdhary as 2nd Indian Soldier
- Moultrie Kelsall as British Correspondent
- Lionel Murton as American Correspondent
- Jaron Yalton as Indian Correspondent
- Homi Bode as Indian Correspondent
- Frank Olegario as Rajah
- Ronald Cardew as Staff Colonel at Kalapur Station

== Production ==
The film was one of a number of larger budgeted adventure films Rank were making in the late 1950s.

=== Casting ===
In 1957, More announced he would play "a romantic adventure" partly set during the Indian Rebellion of 1857, Nightrunners of Bengal. That film was never made and it is likely that More was transferred instead to North West Frontier, a similar project. Olivia de Havilland was originally announced as the female lead. Lauren Bacall's casting was announced in January 1959. She sold her Hollywood house and put her children in school in London for the duration of the shoot.

=== Filming ===
The production started in Rajasthan, India in April 1959. More recalled in his memoirs that it was a physically difficult shoot with many of the cast and crew falling ill with dysentery and other illnesses. The unit stayed at a former Maharajah's palace which had been turned into a hotel. Several Rajasthan landmarks were used as filming locations. Jal Mahal (meaning "Water Palace") in Jaipur city, the capital of the state of Rajasthan, represented the Maharaja's palace at the start of the film. Although it now stands within Man Sagar Lake, the water levels in the 1950s were so low, horseriders could be filmed riding up to its entrance. In Amber the Amber Fort was used as the British governor's residence; other scenes prominently feature the Jagat Shiromani Temple complex. Hundreds of extras were employed for the scenes filmed in India. The metre-gauge railway running through Jaipur was used for the establishing shots of the Indian railway system. For instance the station in the film's fictional town of Haserabad was a goods yard on a spur line leading to Jaipur Junction Nindhar Benar station was the location of the refugee train massacre. A massive film set was built for the scenes when the train escapes from the besieged town; stone walls, which were 120 m (390 ft) long and 8 m (26 ft) high, along with twin towers, gateway and railway track took 700 workmen about two months to build.

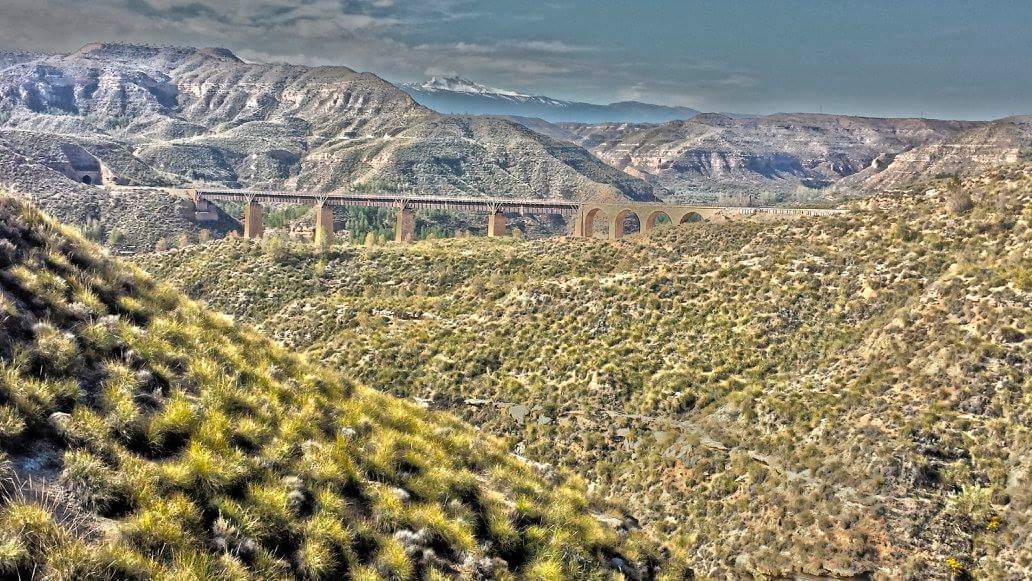
The Anchurón bridge in southern Spain was used for exteriors in the bomb-damaged bridge scenes. Studio sets and models were used for close ups. The real bridge was renovated in the 1970s.

After filming was completed in Rajasthan, the remaining rail sequences were filmed in the province of Granada, Spain where the area's geography matched the dry arid steppe of Northern India. Production started on 10 May 1959 and took five weeks to complete.. It used sections of railway (much has now been abandoned) which traversed the northern part of the Sierra Nevada between Guadix and Baza. The rail yard where the engine Victoria is stored was the Guadix locomotive depot. The train stopped for water at the Estación Ferroviaria Zújar-Freila about 4 mi (6.4 km) west of Baza. The location where the track has to be replaced was filmed among low hills about 9 mi (14 km) north of Guadix. The bomb-damaged rail bridge that the train must cross is the Anchurón bridge over the Solanas de la Carreta near the hamlet of Belerda in Granada (at 37°23′22.82″N 3°11′44.44″W). The ending used Iznalloz railway station near Barrio Primero De Mayo (at 37°23′45.27″N 3°31′39.75″W).

By July 1959, the production had moved to Pinewood Studios in England to complete interior scenes inside the Maharajah's palace, ambassador's residence and the rail carriage. A full-size set was built for the close-up work of the train and carriage crossing the gap on the bomb-damaged railway viaduct.

== Reception ==
=== Box office ===
The film was a major hit in the UK, being among the six most popular films in Great Britain for the year ended 31 October 1959. Kenneth More wrote in his memoirs that it "was a great success". According to Kinematograph Weekly the film performed "better than average" at the British box office in 1959. Variety reported it earned just less than $700,000 in Britain in 1959.

The film was one of seven made by Rank which were bought for distribution in the US by 20th Century Fox. Lauren Bacall called it a "good little movie ... with a stupid title" (referring to the US title, Flame Over India).

=== Critical ===
The Guardian called it "a big British western."

George MacDonald Fraser praised the performance of I. S. Johar:

It was a true rendering of a type imitated successfully by Peter Sellers and others, the quaintly-spoken 'Oh-jollee-good-Sahib' funny Indian – a genuine character familiar to everyone who knows the subcontinent. One critic took violent exception to Johar’s performance: it was a disgraceful caricature, and Johar should be ashamed of himself. I’d like to believe the critic thought that was true, but I doubt it. I suspect the critic knew Johar’s portrayal was absolutely faithful, but preferred to pretend it wasn’t because the critic found it embarrassing, and didn’t like to think that Indians ever really behaved like that – or if they did, it shouldn’t be shown on screen. In other words, damn the truth if it doesn’t fit with what one would like to believe is true – an attitude which, honesty aside, seems to me offensively patronising.

Fraser admired the film and More's performance saying "he had a cheery truculence that was much closer to the real Imperial type than the conventional stiff upper lip." He added "The one flaw [of the film] was the title; I remarked to the technical adviser, a senior ex-Indian Army officer, that it seemed odd, having a Hindu prince up yonder, and he replied that he had no idea where the film was meant to be taking place, but wherever it was, it was not the Frontier."

Filmink called it "a rousing adventure set in India with excellent action/spectacle mixed in with sooky Imperial propaganda, and Lauren Bacall ranks with Sally Ann Howes and Kay Kendall as More’s most effective love interest."

The film led to J. Lee Thompson being hired to direct The Guns of Navarone. After original director Alexander Mackendrick was fired, star Gregory Peck saw Northwest Frontier and agreed for Thompson to take over.

=== Nominations ===
Award	Category	Subject	Result
BAFTA	Best Film from Any Source	J. Lee Thompson	Nominated
BAFTA	Best British Film	J. Lee Thompson	Nominated
BAFTA	Best British Screenplay	Robin Estridge	Nominated
