= Ganesh Temple =

Ganesh Temple may refer to many Hindu temples dedicated to the god Ganesha (or Ganesh):

- Ganesha Temple, Idagunji
- Garh Ganesh Temple, in Jaipur
- Hindu Temple Society of North America, in New York City, built around a Ganesh Temple
- Khajrana Ganesh Temple, in Indore
- Morgaon Ganesha Temple

== See also ==
- List of Ganapati temples, a longer list of temples dedicated to Ganesha
