= Tarkeshwar Nath Temple =

Hindu temple in Jaipur, Rajasthan

Tadkeshwar Nath Mahadev Temple (Jaipur)
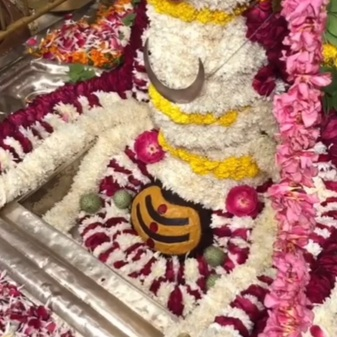
- Tadkeshwar Mahadev (Choura Rasta, Jaipur)

- Location within Jaipur Location within Rajasthan Location within India

Religion
- Affiliation: Hinduism
- District: Jaipur
- Deity: Tadkeshwar Nath (Shiva)

Location
- Location: Choura Rasta, Jaipur
- State: Rajasthan
- Country: India
- Coordinates: 26.922964°N 75.822593°E

Architecture
- Type: Rajasthani architecture with glimpses of local culture
- Creator: Vidhyadhar Bhattacharya (believed)

Tadkeshwar Nath Mahadev Temple (also known as Tadkeshwar Mahadev) is an ancient Hindu temple dedicated to Lord Shiva, located in the Jaipur district of Rajasthan, India. The temple is situated in the Choura Rasta area of Jaipur.

Local tradition suggests that the temple is named after the palm trees (Borassus flabellifer) that were once found in the area. It is believed that the temple dates back to the time of the establishment of Jaipur city (around 1727 CE) or possibly even earlier. The Shivalinga (aniconic representation of Shiva) enshrined in the temple is considered to be swayambhu (self-manifested).

Jaipur is also known as 'Chhoti Kashi' (Little Kashi) due to the presence of numerous ancient Shiva temples, of which this is a prominent one. The architecture of the temple reflects Rajasthani style with glimpses of the local culture.

== History ==
According to legend, the area was once a forest of palm trees. It is said that after a battle between a lion and a goat, a divine voice emerged from the ground, and upon excavation, a self-manifested Shivalinga was discovered, leading to the temple's name.

The initial structure of the temple is believed to have been built during the establishment of Jaipur city, and it was later designed by Vidhyadhar Bhattacharya. The responsibility for the temple's service and worship was entrusted to priests from the Vyas family, who were brought from Amer, and they have been carrying out these duties since then.

The Tadkeshwar Nath Mahadev Temple is a significant center for the celebration of festivals like Mahashivaratri and the Mondays of the Shravan month.

== Gallery ==
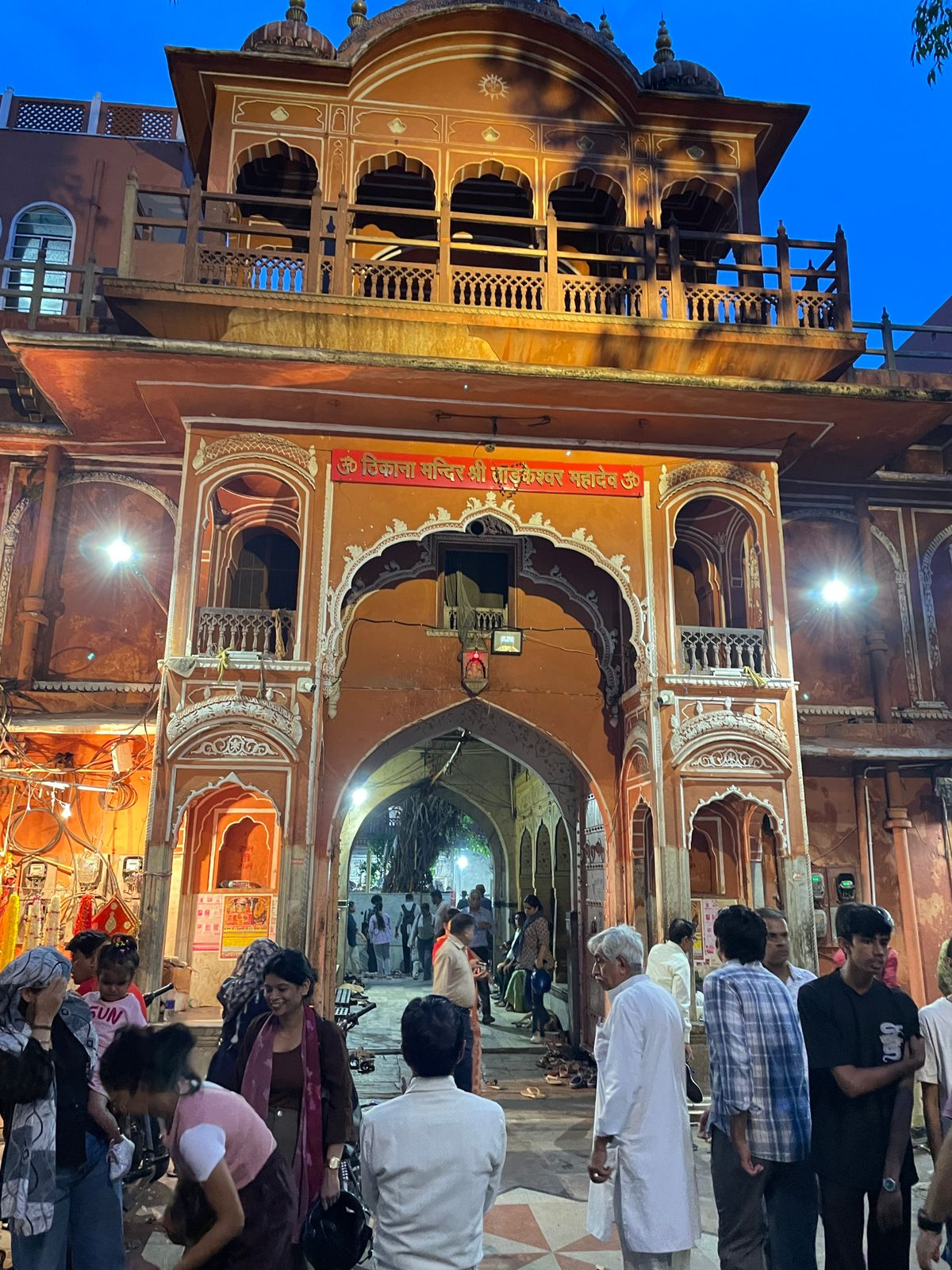
Main entrance of the temple

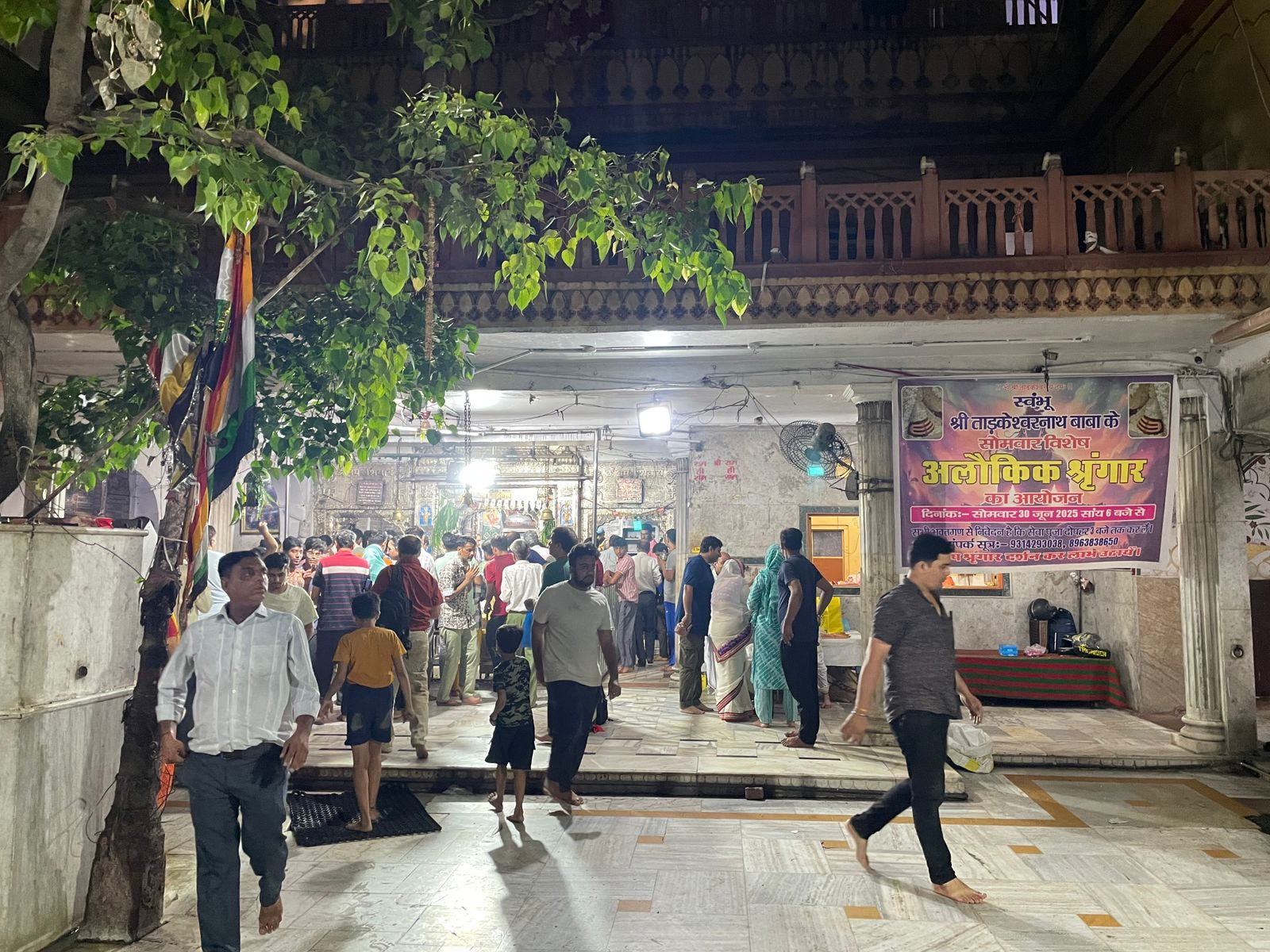
Inside view of the temple

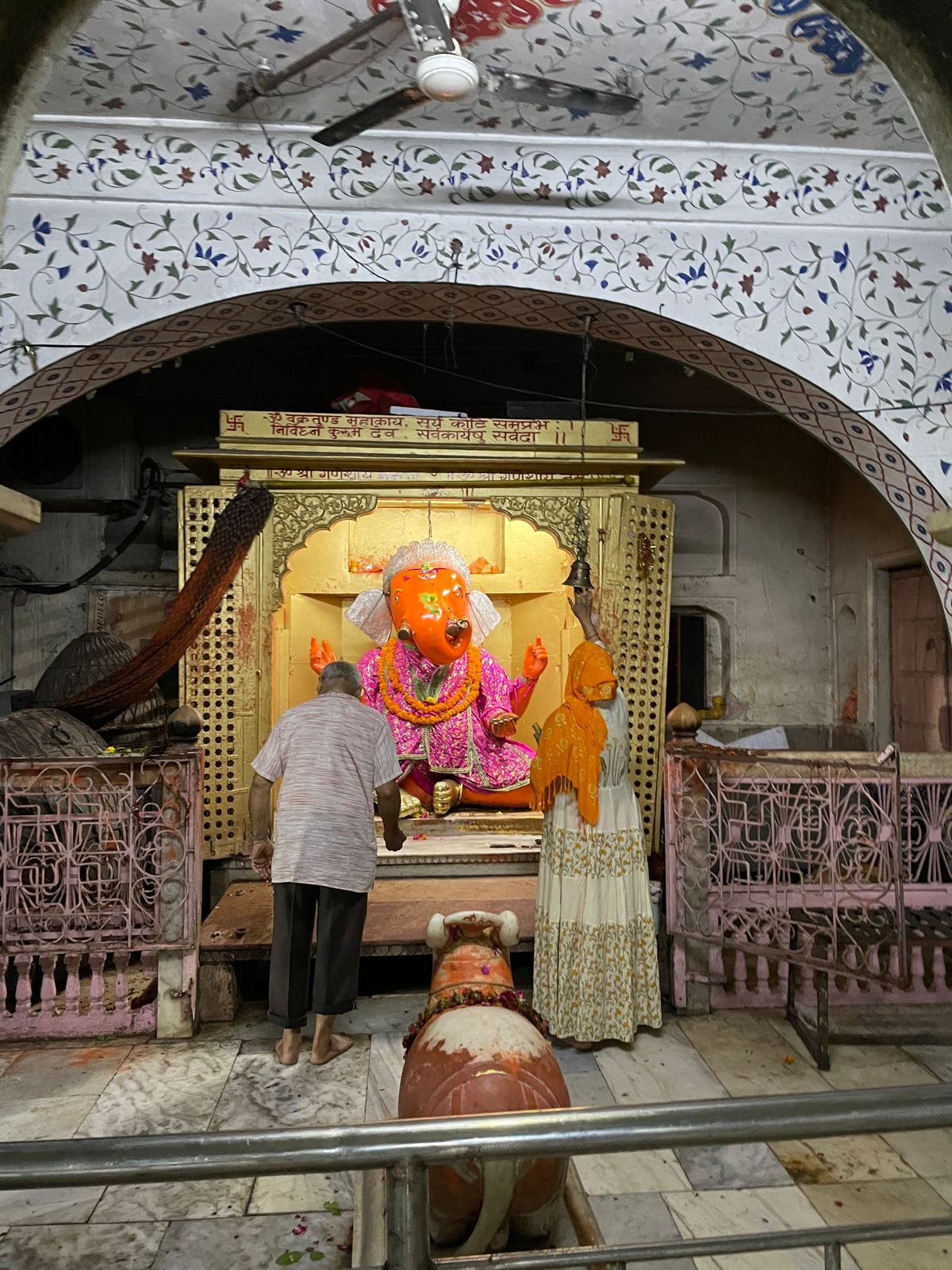
Ganesha shrine inside the temple

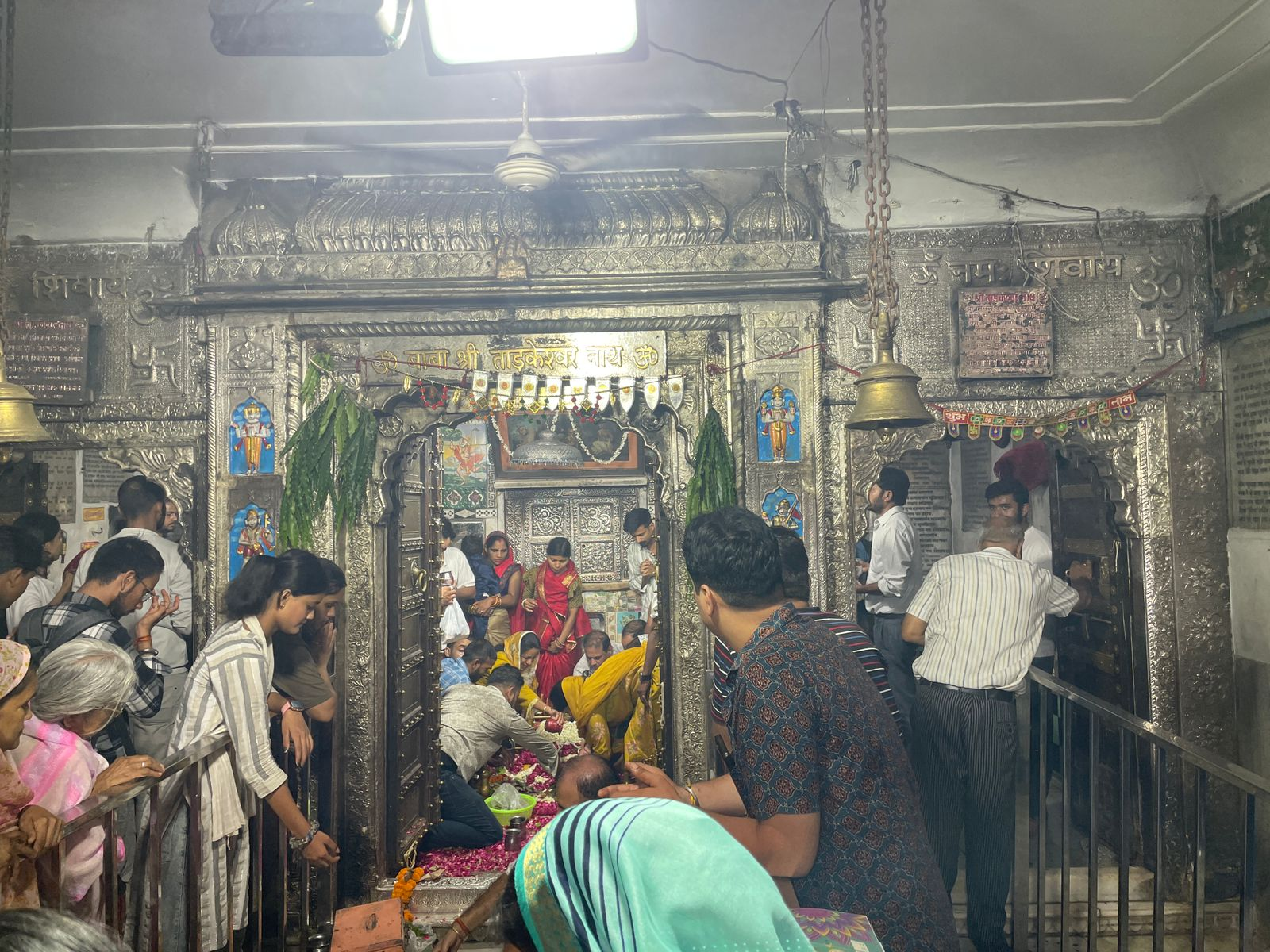
Sanctum sanctorum with silver work

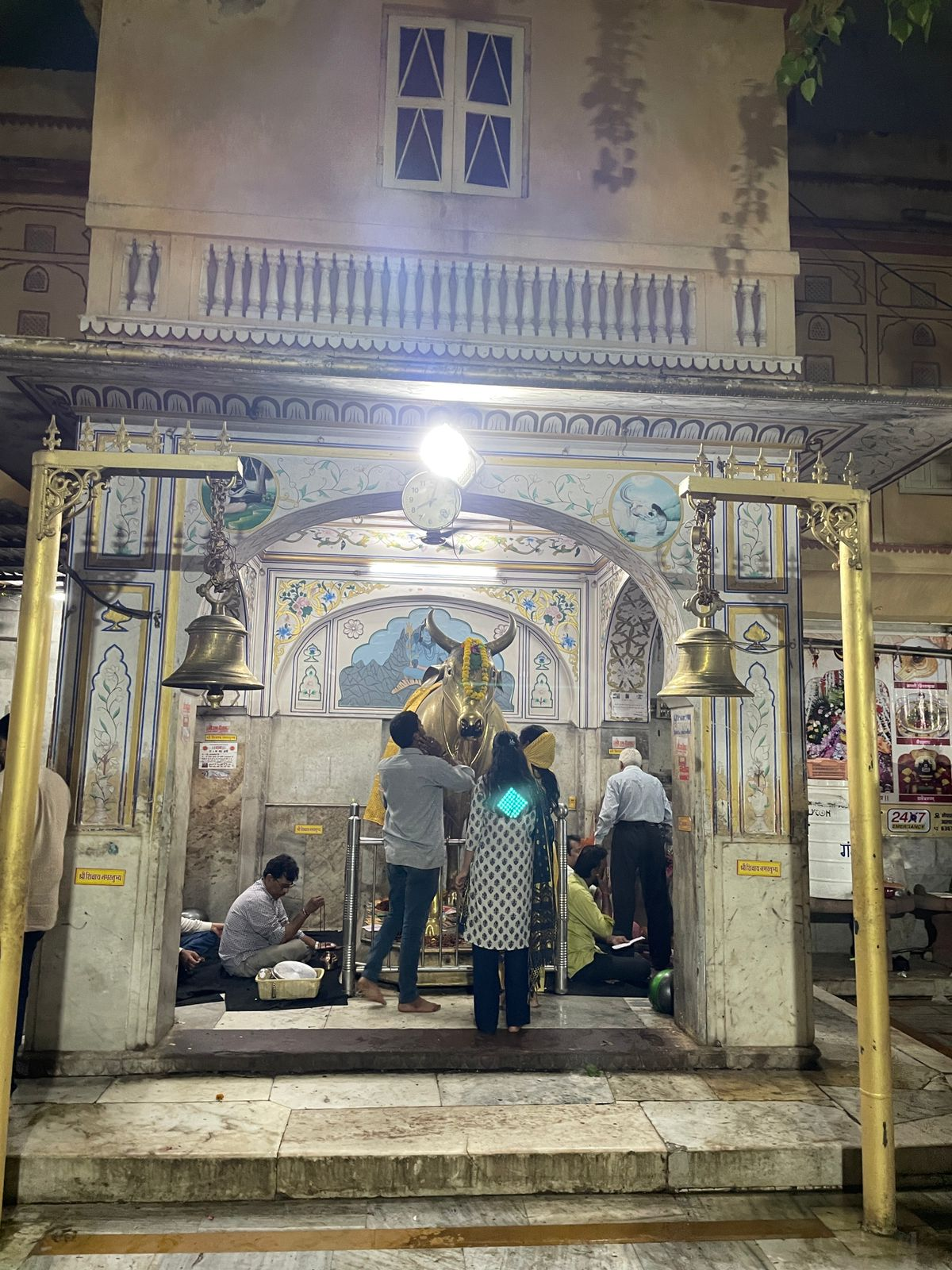
Nandi statue inside the temple
