= Garh Ganesh Temple =

Hindu temple in India

Garh Ganesh Temple (Jaipur)
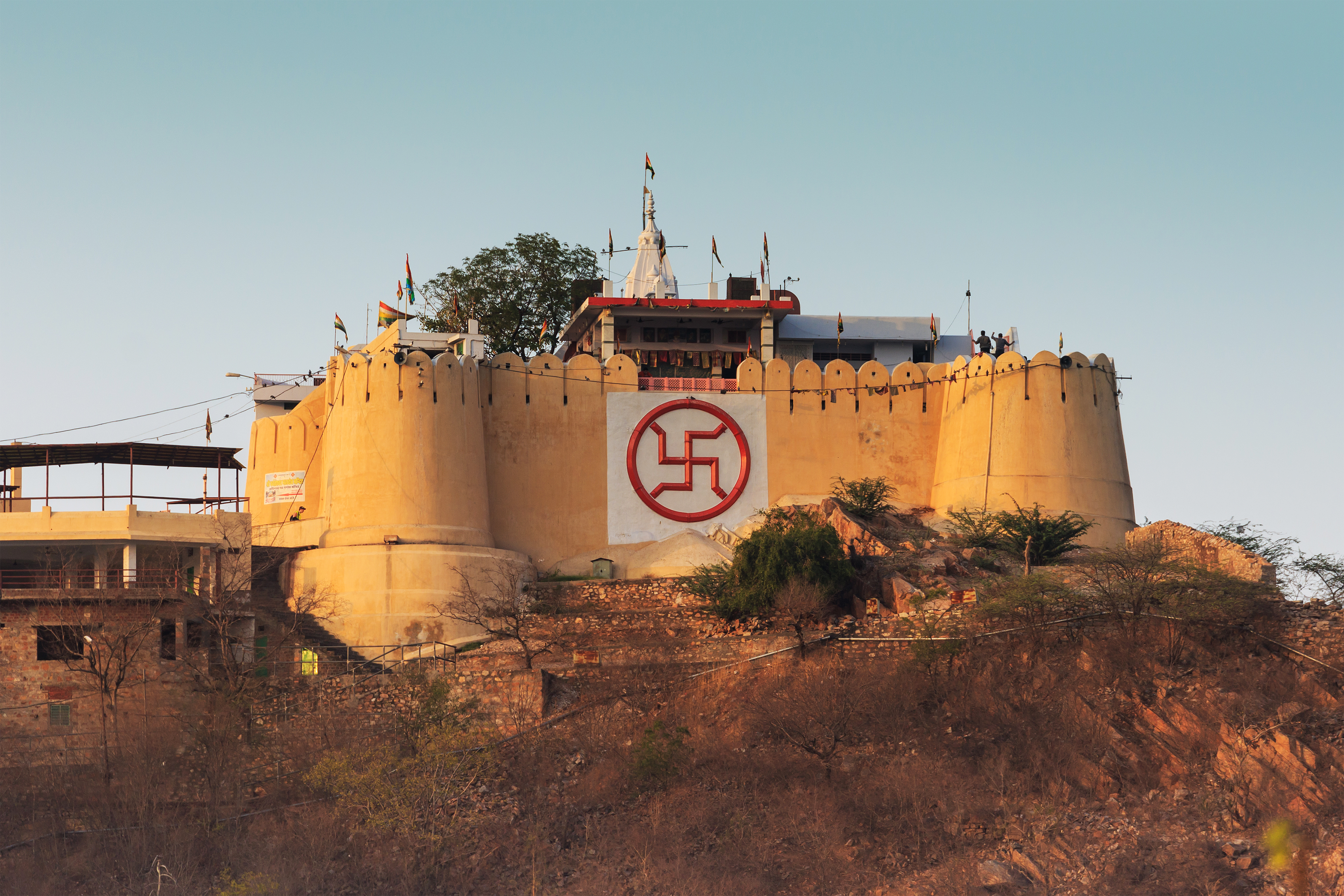
- Garh Ganesh Temple

- Location within Jaipur Location within Rajasthan Location within India

Religion
- Affiliation: Hinduism
- District: Jaipur
- Deity: Ganesha
- Festivals: Ganesh Chaturthi, Wednesdays (special significance)

Location
- State: Rajasthan
- Country: India
- Interactive map of Garh Ganesh Temple (Jaipur)
- Coordinates: 26.945012°N 75.828145°E

Architecture
- Type: Nagara style
- Creator: Sawai Jai Singh II

Website
- Official Website

Garh Ganesh Temple is a Hindu temple located on the Aravalli hills near Jaipur, Rajasthan, India. It is dedicated to Lord Ganesha and is known for its unique idol, which does not feature a trunk-an uncommon representation of the deity. The temple is one of the prominent religious sites in Jaipur, attracting a significant number of devotees, particularly during Ganesh Chaturthi.

== History and establishment ==
The temple was built in the 18th century by Maharaja Sawai Jai Singh II, the founder of Jaipur. The establishment of the temple is associated with the completion of an Ashvamedha Yagya, a Vedic ritual. The temple's location on a hilltop, at an elevation of approximately 500 feet, provides a panoramic view of the surrounding area. To reach the temple, devotees ascend 365 steps, which are symbolic of the days of the year. The ascent is considered a spiritual journey, and many pilgrims see it as a form of devotion to Lord Ganesha.

== Significance of the idol ==
The Garh Ganesh Temple is distinguished by the idol of Ganesha, which is notably absent of a trunk. This representation of Lord Ganesha is rare, as most depictions feature a trunk. According to local tradition, the idol was sculpted in this unique form to reflect the deity's power and divine presence in a different way.

== Religious practices and traditions ==
Devotees at Garh Ganesh Temple engage in various religious practices, one of the most common being the writing of personal wishes on paper and placing them at a designated spot within the temple. This practice is believed to be a way of offering prayers to Lord Ganesha, with the hope that the deity will grant their desires. The temple is especially crowded on Wednesdays, which are considered sacred for Ganesha worshippers, and during the festival of Ganesh Chaturthi.

== Temple structure and location ==
The temple is located at a height of 500 feet above sea level, on the Aravalli hills, offering a sweeping view of the surrounding area. The 365 steps that lead to the temple are a significant feature of the temple complex, both symbolically representing the 365 days of the year and serving as a physical challenge for pilgrims. The temple structure follows the Nagara style of architecture, which is common in North India. This style typically includes tall, spire-like structures, as well as intricate carvings and decorations.

== Festivals and celebrations ==
Garh Ganesh Temple observes several religious festivals throughout the year. During Ganesh Chaturthi, a significant five-day fair is organized annually, drawing large gatherings of devotees. On the first Wednesday following Diwali, the festival of Anna-koot is celebrated at the temple. The last Wednesday of the 'Paush' month is marked by the celebration of 'Paush Bade', a special event organized at the temple.

== Management ==
The Garh Ganesh Temple is managed by the Audhchya family, who have been entrusted with its maintenance and daily operations. The current priest, Shri Pradeep Audichya, is the 13th in his family line to serve the temple, and his son, Gaurav Mehta, is also involved in the temple’s activities.
