= Man Sagar Lake =

Lake in Jaipur district, Rajasthan, India

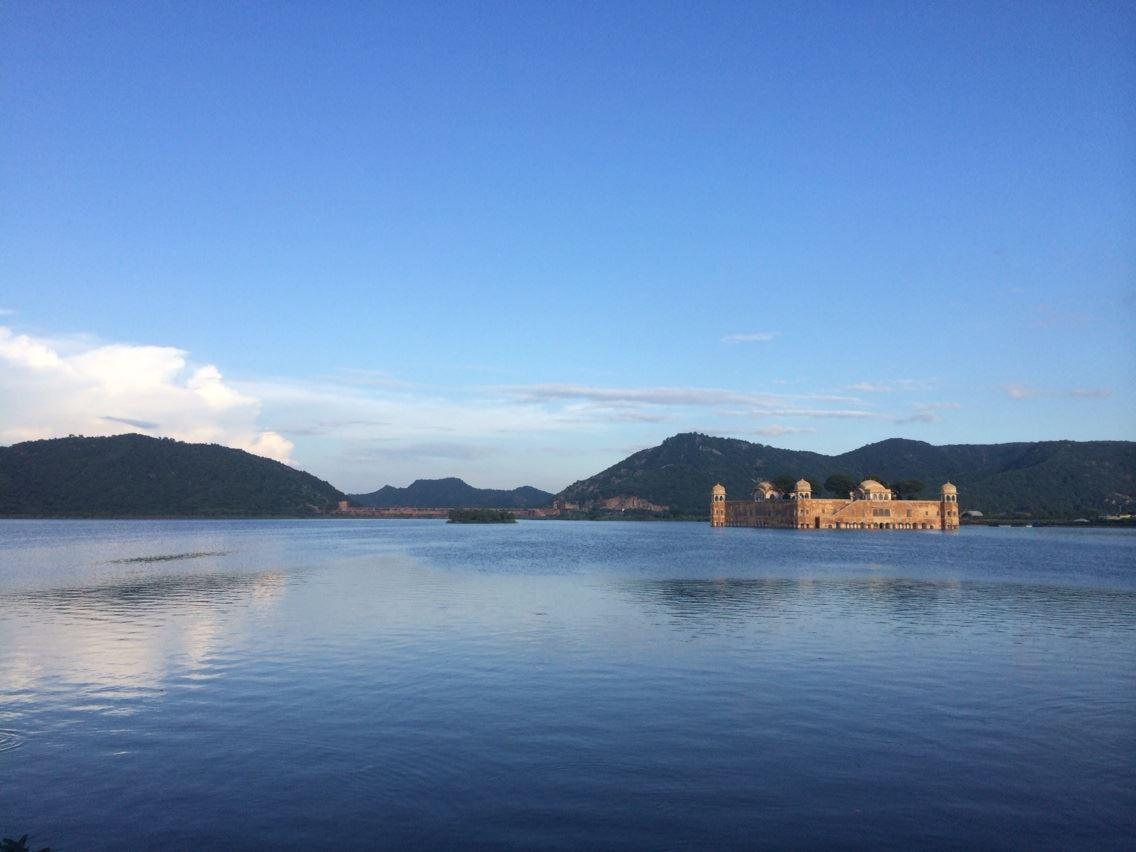
- The Jal Mahal floating on the Man Sagar Lake in Jaipur

- Location within Rajasthan
- Location: Jaipur
- Coordinates: 26.956°N 75.85°E
- Lake type: Artificial
- Catchment area: 23.5 km^{2} (9.1 sq mi)
- Basin countries: India
- Surface area: 139 ha (1.39 km^{2})
- Max. depth: 4.5 m (15 ft)

Man Sagar Lake is an artificial lake, situated in Jaipur, the capital city of the state of Rajasthan in India. It is named after Raja Man Singh, the then ruler of Amer, who constructed it in c. 1610 by damming the Dravyavati river. The Jal Mahal is situated in the middle of the lake.

== Topography ==
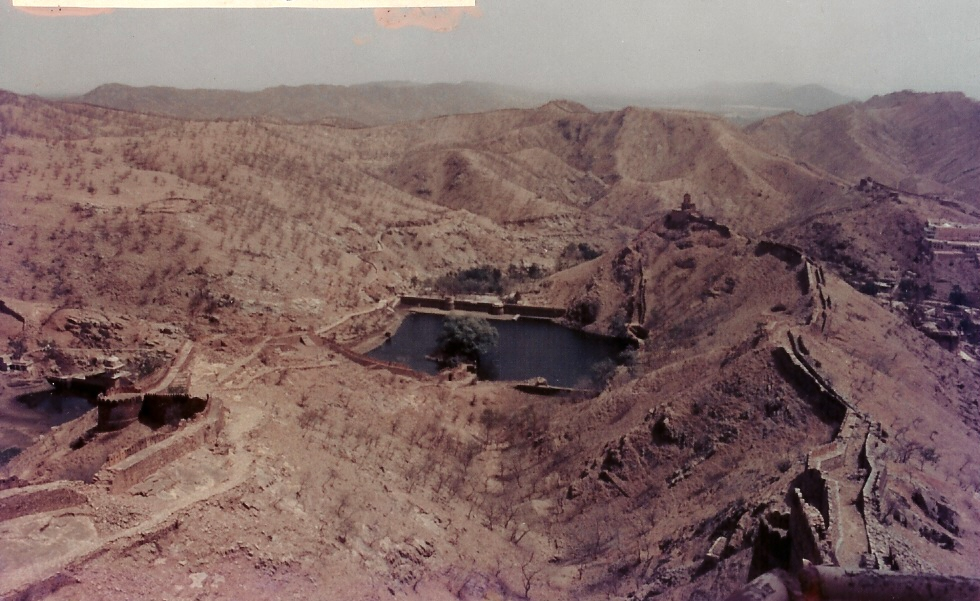
Aravalli hills in Jaipur

The lake, situated to the north of Jaipur city lies between Amer, the historic city and Jaipur, the provincial headquarters of Rajasthan state. It has a water spread area of 300 acres (121 ha) and is enclosed by the Aravalli hills on the north, west and eastern sides, while the southern side consists of plains that are intensely inhabited. There is the Nahargarh Fort (Nahargarh meaning home of tigers) in the hills that provides a commanding view of the Man Sagar Lake and the Jal Mahal palace, in addition to a beautiful view of the city of Jaipur. The lake was created by constructing a dam across the Darbhawati River, between Khilagarh hills and the hilly areas of Nahargarh, in the 16th century. The catchment area (watershed) for the lake is 23.5 square kilometres (9.1 mi^{2}) contributed by a semi-urban area as to 50% (generating in heavy rains unpaved street erosion) and hilly terrain accounting for the balance, being the largely-deforested or precipitous Aravalli hills, which also creates siltation. It is believed such deposition did not have to be fixed with dredging and filtration before the 20th century. Rainfall averages 657.4 millimetres (25.88 in) per year (90% of which occurs during June to September). The outlet end of the dam feeds a large irrigation system (obligatory water demand for this is reported to be 2,410,000 cubic metres during the five months from November to March). Two large nalas (streams) that also drain the surrounding Nahargarh hills and Jaipur are the Brahmpuri and Nagtalai, which bring in untreated sewage, in addition to sediment run-offs of unpaved streets.

The Aravalli hills surrounding the lake area, towards the north east of Jaipur, have quartzite rock formations (with a thin layer of soil cover). Rock exposures on the surface in some parts of the project area have also been utilised for constructing buildings. From the north east, the Kanak Vrindavan valley, where a temple complex sits, the hills slope gently towards the lake edge. Within the lake area, the ground area is made up of a thick mantle of soil, blown sand and alluvium. Forest denudation, particularly in the hilly areas, has caused soil erosion, compounded by wind and water action. Due to these human factors silt built-up in the lake raises the bed level of the lake annually by many centimetres.

=== Geology and soils ===
The hills surrounding the lake area, towards the north east of Jaipur, have quartzite rock formations (with a thin layer of soil cover), which is part of the Aravalli hills range. Rock exposures on the surface in some parts of the project area have also been utilised for constructing buildings. From the north east, the Kanak Vrindavan valley, where a temple complex is situated, the hills slope gently towards the lake edge. Within the lake area, the ground area is made up of a thick mantle of soil, blown sand and alluvium. Forest denudation, particularly in the hilly areas, has caused soil erosion, compounded by wind and water action. Due to this, silt built up in the lake resulting in a raising of the bed level of the lake.

During 1596 AD, a severe famine in this region was linked to an acute shortage of water. The then ruler of Amer was, therefore, motivated to build a dam to store water to overcome the severe hardships caused by the famine to the inhabitants. A dam was constructed, initially using earth and quartzite, across the eastern valley between Amer hills and Amagarh hills. The dam was later converted into a stone masonry structure in the 17th century. The dam, as existing now (see picture), is about 300 metres (980 ft) long and 28.5–34.5 metres (94–113 ft) in width. It is provided with three sluice gates for release of water for irrigation of agricultural land in the down stream area. Since then, the dam, the lake and the palace in its midst have undergone several rounds of restoration under various rulers of Rajasthan but the final restoration in the 18th century is credited to Jai Singh II of Amer. During this period, a number of other historical and religious places, such as the Amer Fort, Jaigarh Fort, Nahargarh Fort, Khilangarh Fort, and Kanak Vrindavan Valley were also built in the vicinity. All of these places are now linked by a tourist corridor of roads.

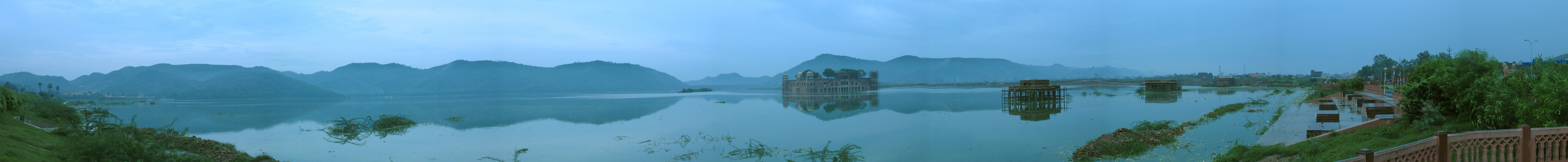
Panoramic view of "Jal Mahal in Jaipur"

In recent years, with the urbanisation of Jaipur city and areas surrounding the lake, the ecological system of the lake and its vicinity deteriorated drastically. It became heavily silted thereby reducing the surface area of the lake. The silt deposited (estimated to be about 2,500,000 cubic metres) was contaminated with effluents (untreated sewage) from the city's drainage system causing intense eutrophication. The ground water surrounding the lake was also found to be highly contaminated and created serious health hazards. The rainwater combined with sewage water flow from the city resulted in the lake water giving off a foul smell. Water samples collected from the lake were tested and found to clearly show that the water quality was not uniform. It was extremely poor in southeast, south and southwest due to the influent nalas. The water quality parameters of BOD and total nitrogen recorded were 20 mg/L each. BOD values indicated high levels of organic matter. COD showed a very high level of oxidisable chemicals. Nitrate and phosphate content were excessive. Coliform counts was more than 500 times the norm. The Chloride content was found to be fatal to plants and fish.

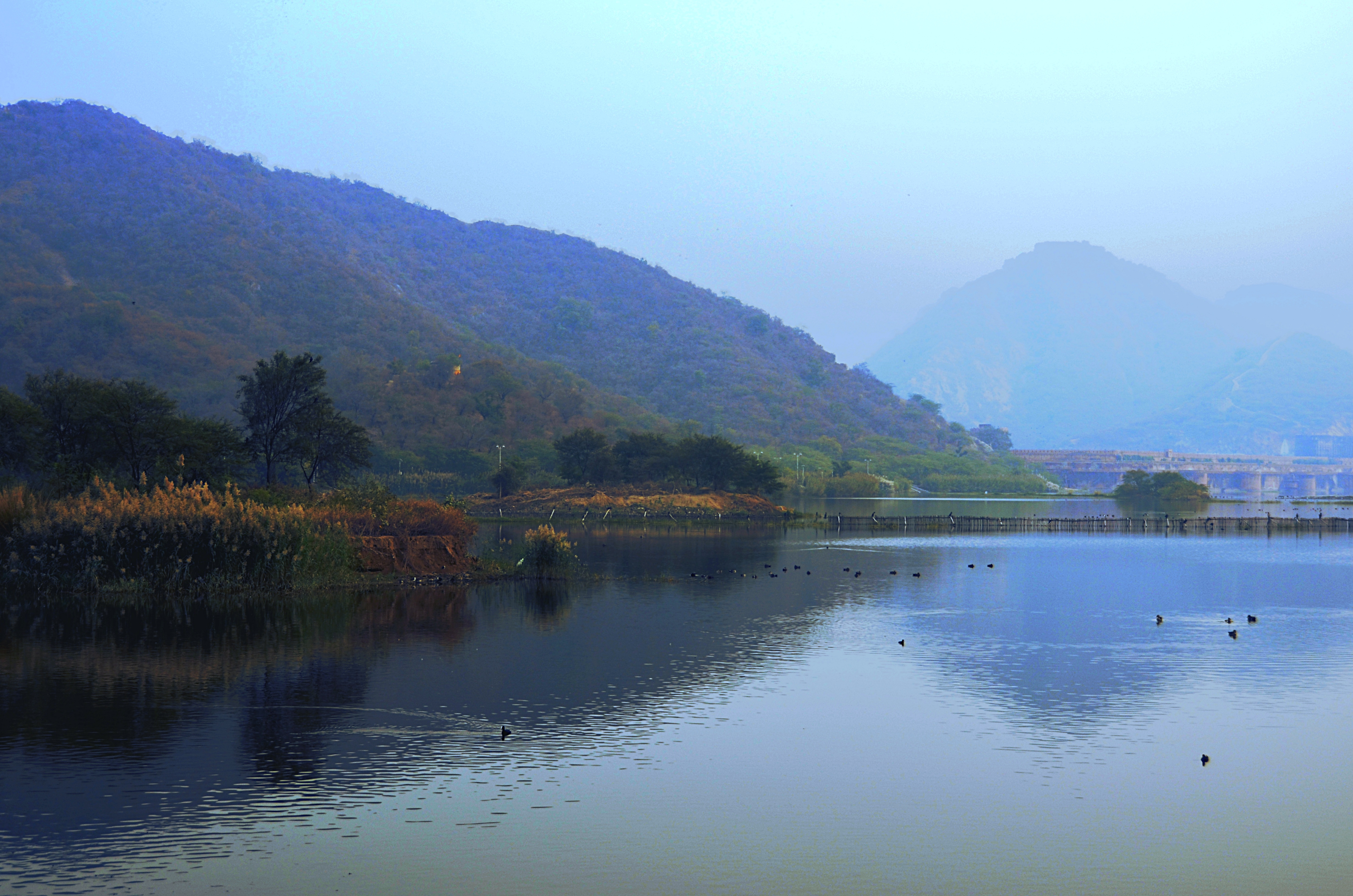
A view of the Nesting Islands along the banks of Mansagar Lake, Jaipur

=== Hydrology ===
The fresh water draining into the lake is seasonal during the rainy months of July to September. This flow originates from 325 small and large streams that drain from the hilly catchment of the lake. The two municipal nalas from Jaipur city contribute a perennial flow to the lake. The volume of water in the lake has been assessed as 3,130,000 cubic metres at the maximum water level. During the dry season, from October to June, it is said to be about 360,000 cubic metres. The depth of water at the deepest location in the lake is recorded at a maximum of 4.5 metres (15 ft) and a minimum of 1.5 metres (4.9 ft). In addition, the stored water is also used for irrigation at the downstream end of the lake during the summer months resulting in a drying up of the lake during these months.

The lake is a fetid polluted body of water that stinks all year round.

=== Flora and fauna ===
The hills surrounding the lake area, towards the north east of Jaipur, have quartzite rock formations (with a thin layer of soil cover), which is part of Aravalli hills range. Rock exposures on the surface in some parts of the project area have also been utilised for constructing buildings. From the north east, the Kanak Vrindavan valley, where a temple complex is situated, the hills slope gently towards the lake edge. Within the lake area, the ground area is made up of a thick mantle of soil, blown sand and alluvium. Forest denudation, particularly in the hilly areas, has caused soil erosion, compounded by wind and water action. Due to this, silt built up in the lake resulting in a raising of the bed level of the lake. The flora is dictated by the subsidiary Edaphic type of dry tropical forests in the catchment; the total forest area of 9.01 square kilometres (3.48 mi^{2}) comprises dense forest cover of 6.45 square kilometres (2.49 mi^{2}) area, degraded forest of 0.95 square kilometres (0.37 mi^{2}) and encroachment of 1.61 square kilometres (0.62 mi^{2}). The dominant floral species found in the area is Dhauk (Anogeissus pendula), which has lean foliage. The low vegetation cover and steep gradient of the hills causes substantial erosion and the eroded material flows into the lake. On the western side, beyond the urbanised area, the Nahargarh hills on the western side are also denuded, which has reduced its moisture retaining capacity.

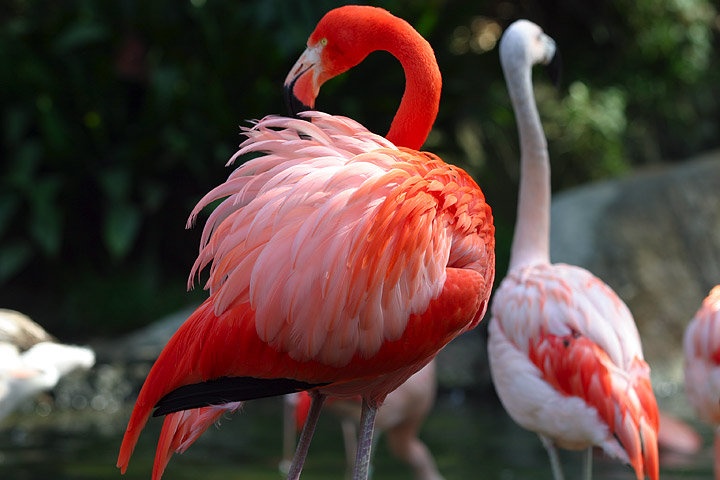
Flamingo

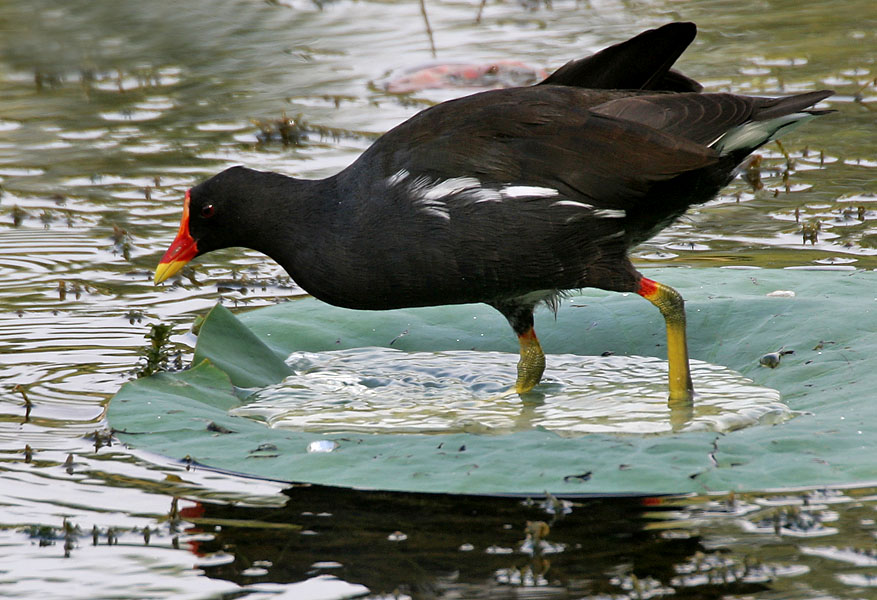
Common moorhen

The reserve forest area of the lake catchment has several wild life species such as deer, jungle cat, striped hyena, Indian fox, Indian wild boar and leopards.

The lake used to be a bird watcher's paradise in the past and was a favourite ground for the Rajput kings of Jaipur for royal duck shooting parties during picnics. The lake was natural habitat for more than 150 species of local and migratory birds that included large flamingo, great crested grebe, pintail, pochards, kestrel, coot, redshank, marsh sandpiper, ruff, herring gull, red-breasted flycatcher, grey wagtail, but their numbers declined with the deterioration of the lake. Now, with restoration works undertaken, the birds have started visiting the lake again, though not to the same degree as in the past. In order to attract attention to the lake's condition, a private initiative of holding an annual birding fair was started in 1997. It is reported that the common moorhen, a resident species has started breeding in large numbers at the lake. The other birds seen now are the grey heron, white-browed wagtail and blue-tailed bee-eaters. The lake was also home for a large species of the aquatic ecosystem such as fish, insects, microorganisms and aquatic vegetation.

== Birds of Man Sagar Lake ==
Throughout the year, more than 180 species of birds (www.birdlife.net) have been recorded at the Birding Fair site, making it as a great attraction to bird watchers. As the lake is being restored and islands have been created for bird nesting, more species in bigger number are expected to settle here.

The checklist of birds at around man sagar is below:

| 1. | Great Crested Grebe |
| 2. | Little Grebe |
| 3. | Greater Flamingo |
| 4. | Lesser Flamingo |
| 5. | Eurasian Spoonbill |
| 6. | White Necked Stork |
| 7. | Painted Stork |
| 8. | Great White Pelican |
| 9. | Dalmatian Pelican |
| 10. | Great Cormorant |
| 11. | Indian Cormorant |
| 12. | Little Cormorant |
| 13. | Oriental Darter |
| 14. | Grey Heron |
| 15. | Pond Heron |
| 16. | Night Heron |
| 17. | Cattle Egret |
| 18. | Great Egret |
| 19. | Median Egret |
| 20. | Small Egret |
| 21. | Ruddy Shelduck |
| 22. | Lesser Whistling Duck |
| 23. | Wigeon |
| 24. | Garganey |
| 25. | Pintail |
| 26. | Mallard |
| 27. | Gadwall |
| 28. | Shoveler |
| 29. | Spotbill Duck |
| 30. | Common Teal |
| 31. | Cotton Teal |
| 32. | Redcrested Pochard |
| 33. | Common Pochard |
| 34. | White eyed Pochard |
| 35. | Tufted Pochard |
| 36. | Barheaded Geese |
| 37. | Black Shouldered Kite |
| 38. | Pariah Kite |
| 39. | Brahminy Kite |
| 40. | Shikra |
| 41. | Eurasian Sparrowhawk |
| 42. | Lesser Spotted Eagle |
| 43. | Short toed Eagle |
| 44. | Marsh Harrier |
| 45. | Osprey |
| 46. | King Vulture |
| 47. | White Backed Vulture |
| 48. | Egyptian Vulture |
| 49. | Eurasian Hobby |
| 50. | Laggar Falcon |
| 51. | Common Kestrel |
| 52. | Grey Francolin |
| 53. | Common Quail |
| 54. | Jungle Bush Quail |
| 55. | Common Peafowl |
| 56. | Brown Crake |
| 57. | White breasted |
| 58. | Common Moorhen |
| 59. | Common Coot |
| 60. | Pheasant tailed Jacana |
| 61. | Bronze winged Jacana |
| 62. | Common Snipe |
| 63. | Painted Snipe |
| 64. | Pied Avocet |
| 65. | Black winged Stilt |
| 66. | Red wattled Lapwing |
| 67. | White tailed Lapwing |
| 68. | Little ringed Plover |
| 69. | Kentish Plover |
| 70. | Common Redshank |
| 71. | Common Greenshank |
| 72. | Marsh Sandpiper |
| 73. | Wood Sandpiper |
| 74. | Common Sandpiper |
| 75. | Green Sandpiper |
| 76. | Little Stint |
| 77. | Temminck's Stint |
| 78. | Dunlin |
| 79. | Ruff |
| 80. | Black tailed Godwit |
| 81. | Herring Gull |
| 82. | Brown headed Gull |
| 83. | Whiskered Tern |
| 84. | Indian River Tern |
| 85. | Little Tern |
| 86. | Gull billed |
| 87. | Green Pigeon |
| 88. | Blue Rock Pigeon |
| 89. | Ring Dove |
| 90. | Red turtle Dove |
| 91. | Little Brown Dove |
| 92. | Rose ringed Parakeet |
| 93. | Plum headed Parakeet |
| 94. | Koel |
| 95. | Common Hawk Cuckoo |
| 96. | Pied Crested Cuckoo |
| 97. | Greater Coucal |
| 98. | Spotted Owlet |
| 99. | Indian Jungle Nightjar |
| 100. | House Swift |
| 101. | Palm Swift |
| 102. | Pied Kingfisher |
| 103. | Common Kingfisher |
| 104. | White breasted |
| 105. | Blue tailed Bee-eater |
| 106. | Blue cheeked Bee-eater |
| 107. | Green Bee-eater |
| 108. | Indian Roller |
| 109. | Common Hoopoe |
| 110. | Common Grey Hornbill |
| 111. | Coppersmith Barbet |
| 112 | Black rumped |
| 113. | Yellow crowned |
| 114. | Plain Martin |
| 115. | Sand Martin |
| 116. | Dusky crag Martin |
| 117. | Wire tailed Swallow |
| 118. | Red rumped Swallow |
| 119. | Grey Shrike |
| 120. | Bay backed Shrike |
| 121. | Long tailed Shrike |
| 122. | Golden Oriole |
| 123. | Black Drongo |
| 124. | White bellied Drongo |
| 125. | Large Cuckooshrike |
| 126. | Common Woodshrike |
| 127. | Brahminy Starling |
| 128. | Pied Starling |
| 129. | Rosy Starling |
| 130. | Common Starling |
| 131. | Common Myna |
| 132. | Bank Myna |
| 133. | Indian Tree-pie |
| 134. | House Crow |
| 135. | Indian Pitta |
| 136. | Small Minivet |
| 137. | White bellied Minivet |
| 138. | Common Iora |
| 139. | Redvented Bulbul |
| 140. | White cheeked Bulbul |
| 141. | Common Babbler |
| 142. | Large Grey Babbler |
| 143. | Jungle Babbler |
| 144. | Paradise Flycatcher |
| 145. | Red breasted Flycatcher |
| 146. | Grey headed Flycatcher |
| 147. | White browed Fantail |
| 148. | Grey breasted Prinia |
| 149. | Rufous fronted Prinia |
| 150. | Ashy Prinia |
| 151. | Plain Prinia |
| 152. | Oriental White eye |
| 153. | Common Tailor Bird |
| 154. | Lesser White throat |
| 155. | Common Chiffchaff |
| 156. | Indian Robin |
| 157. | Magpie Robin |
| 158. | Black Redstart |
| 159. | Brown Rock Chat |
| 160. | Pied Bushchat |
| 161. | Common Stonechat |
| 162. | Orange headed Thrush |
| 163. | Yellow Wagtail |
| 164. | Yellow headed Wagtail |
| 165. | Grey Wagtail |
| 166. | White Wagtail |
| 167. | Large pied Wagtail |
| 168. | Tawny Pipit |
| 169. | Indian Tree-Pipit |
| 170. | Paddyfield Pipit |
| 171. | Rufous tailed Lark |
| 172. | Oriental Sky Lark |
| 173. | Purple Sunbird |
| 174. | Grey Tit |
| 175. | House Sparrow |
| 176. | Chestnut shouldered |
| 177. | Baya Weaver |
| 178. | White rumped Munia |
| 179. | Indian Silverbill |
| 180. | Crested Bunting |
