= Jal Mahal =

Palace in Jaipur, Rajasthan

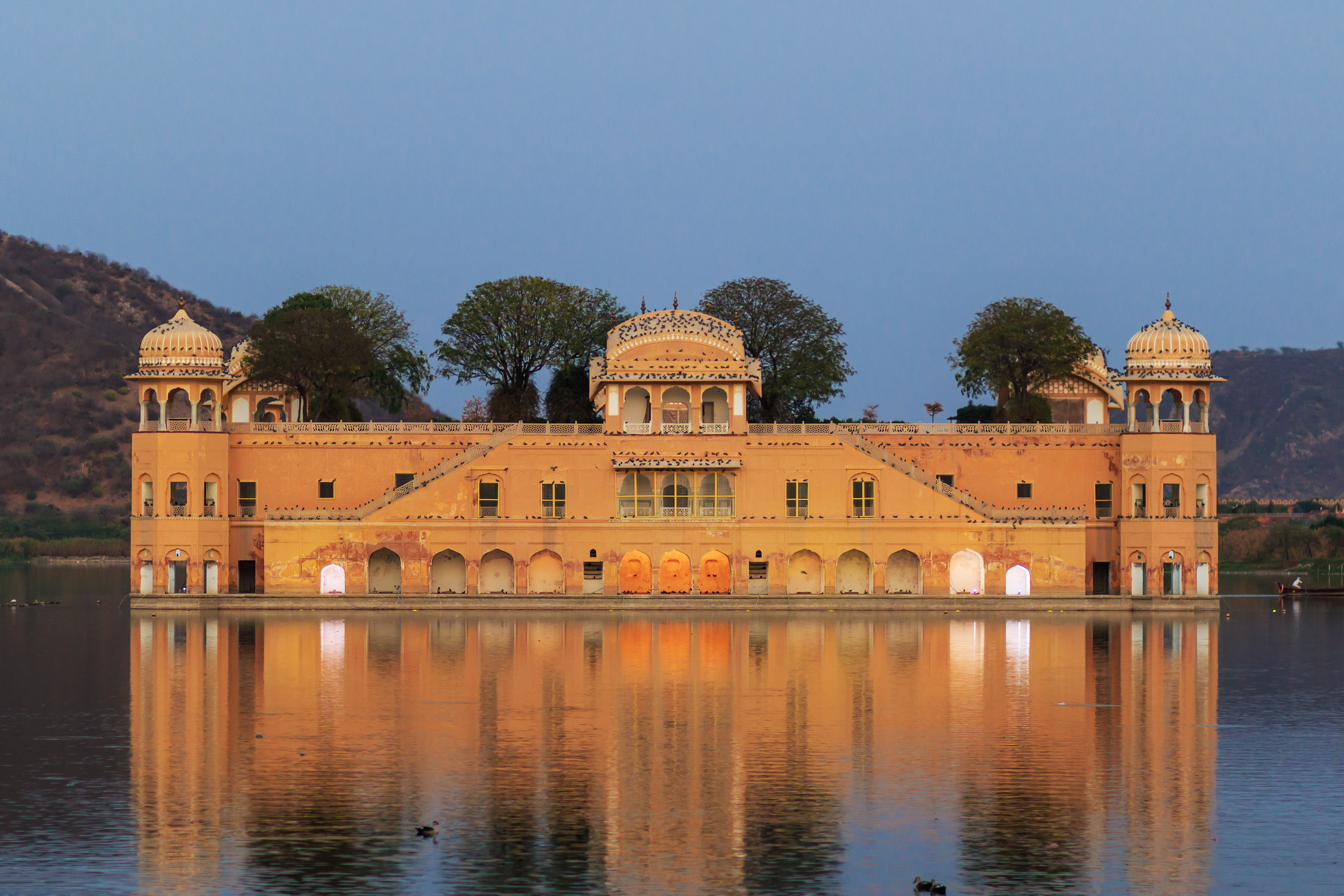

- Location within Jaipur Location within Rajasthan
- Location: Jaipur
- Coordinates: 26.9537°N 75.8463°E
- Type: Freshwater – Recreational
- Catchment area: 23.5 square kilometres (9.1 mi^{2})
- Basin countries: India
- Managing agency: KGK Group of Companies JAIPUR
- Surface area: 300 acres (120 ha)
- Max. depth: 4.5 metres (15 ft)
- Settlements: Jaipur

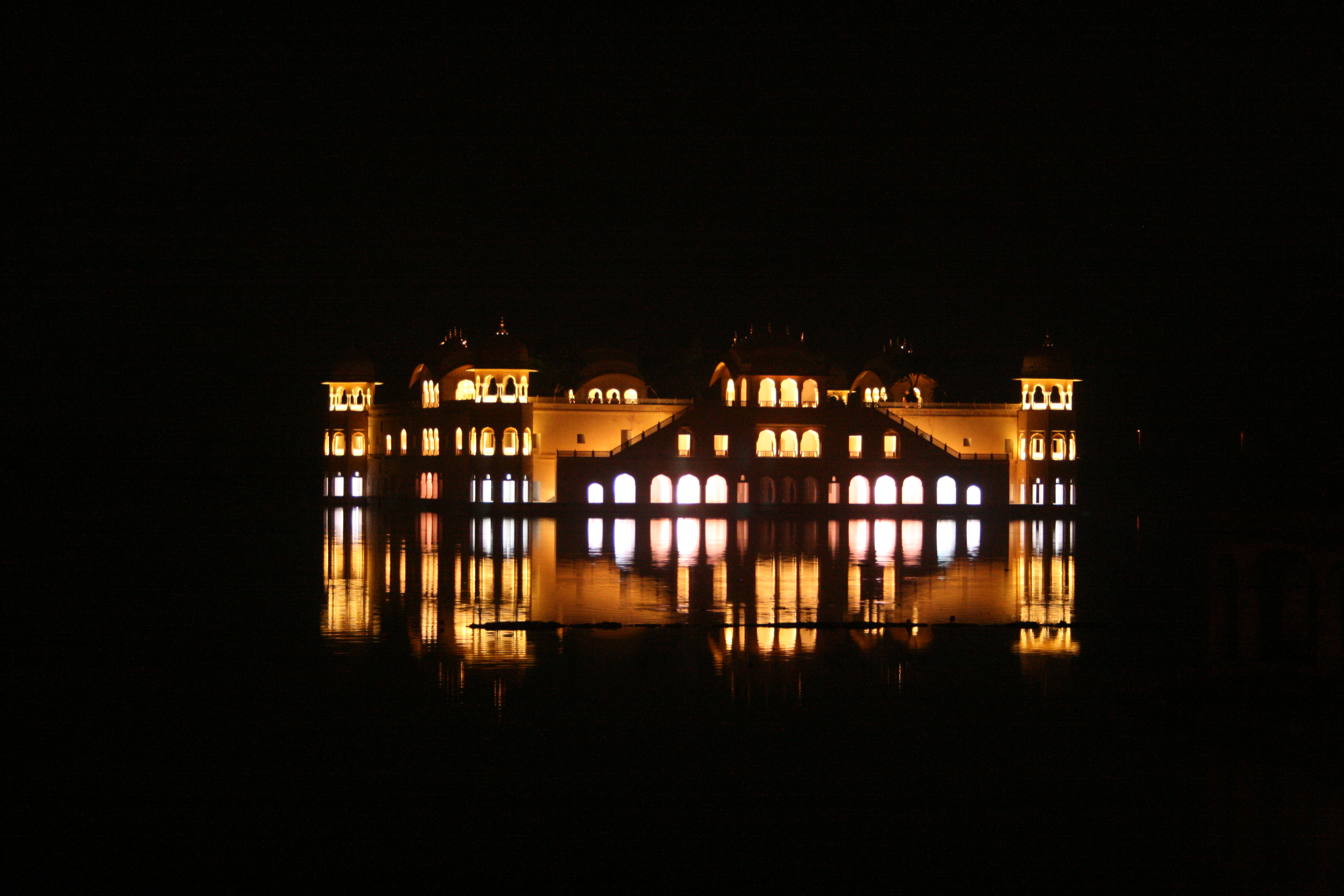
Jal Mahal at night.

Jal Mahal (Hindi: [dʒəl mɛːɦəl], lit. 'Water Palace') is a historical palace in the middle of Man Sagar Lake in the city of Jaipur, capital of the Indian state of Rajasthan.

== History ==
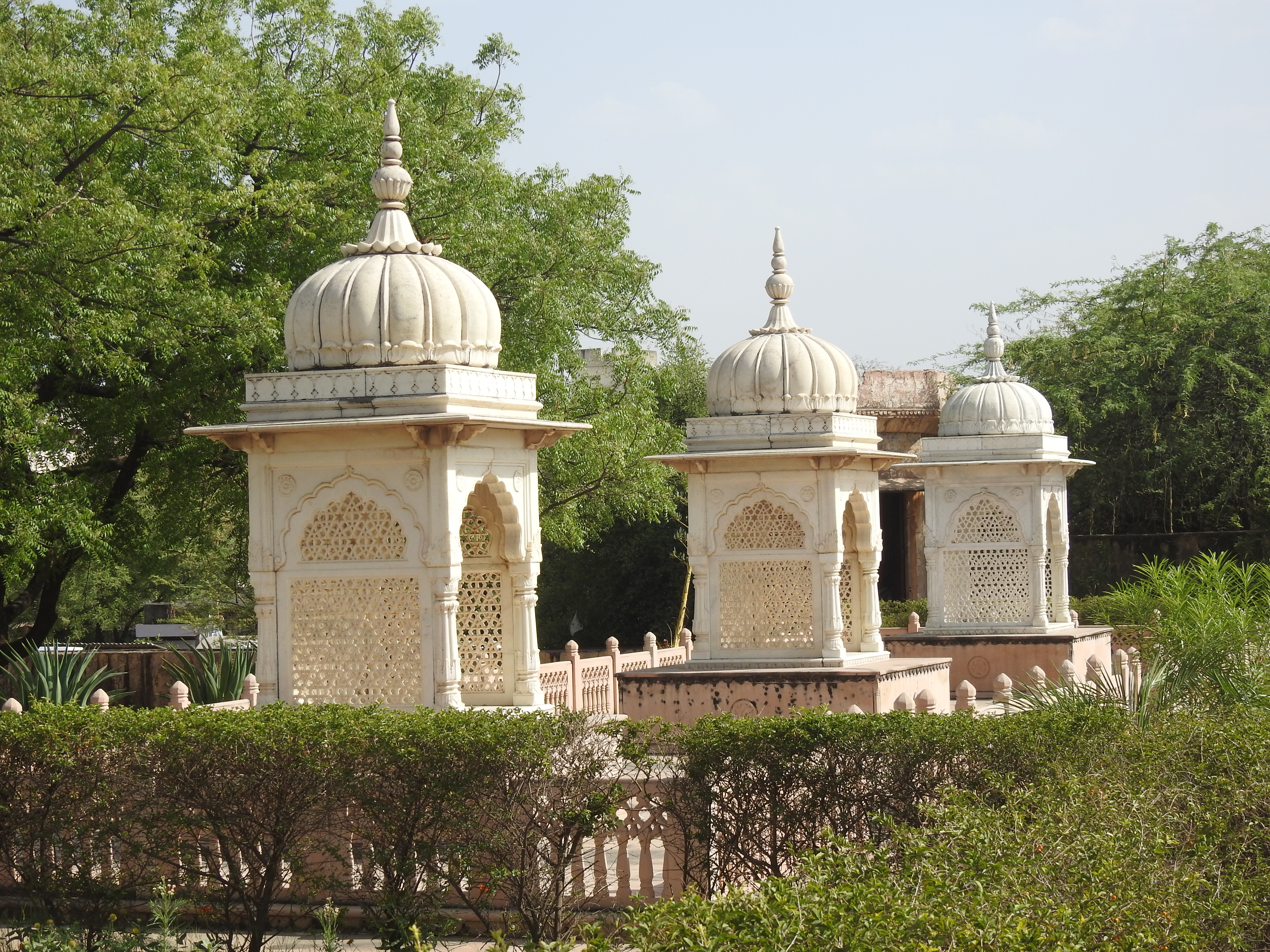
Royal Cenotaphs of Gaitore

Jal Mahal in 2025

Originally constructed around 1699 by Sawai Jai Singh of Amer, India, as a duck-hunting lodge rather than a royal residence, the building and the lake around it were later renovated and enlarged in the mid-18th century by Maharaja Madho Singh I.

== Grounds ==
Jal Mahal is built from local pink and red sandstone and stands as a five-story building in the middle of Man Sagar Lake. The Man Sagar Dam faces eastward while the local roadside promenade faces west. When the lake is at full capacity, its depth reaches approximately 4.5 meters (15 feet); consequently, the lower 4 storeys remain submerged underwater..

The top floor terrace features a central garden with arched passages, flanked by four octagonal Chhatri or "domed-pavilions" marking the corners of the building.

The hills surrounding the lake to the northeast belong to the Aravalli mountain range and feature quartzite rock formations historically quarried for local construction.

In the past, the palace has suffered subsidence and partial plaster wall logging damage due to rising damp which has been repaired under restoration projects commissioned by the Government of Rajasthan.

From the northeast, the Kanak Vrindavan valley, where a temple complex sits, the hills slope gently towards the lake edge. Within the lake area, the ground area is made up of a thick mantle of soil, blown sand, and alluvium. Forest denudation, particularly in the hilly areas, has caused soil erosion, compounded by wind and water action. As a result, silt built up in the lake incrementally raises the lake bed.

=== Royal Cenotaphs of Gaitore ===
Located opposite the lake at Gaitore are chhatris and cenotaphs erected over cremation platforms of notable Kachwaha rulers of Jaipur. Originally built by Sawai Jai Singh II, the cenotaphs are in honor of Pratap Singh, Madho Singh II among others. The monument for Jai Singh II is noted for its intricate carvings and 20 carved domed pillars.

== Restoration ==
In 2004, the Rajasthan Tourism Development Corporation signed an agreement with Jal Mahal Resorts, granting it a 99-year lease to develop the palace and 100 acres along the Man Sagar Lake. From 2005 onwards the company has worked on the cleaning of the lake, reviving the ecology of the area and restoring the palace. For the future, Jal Mahal Resorts plans to build the site and surrounding area into a tourist destination for visitors to the city of Jaipur.

=== Lake Restoration ===
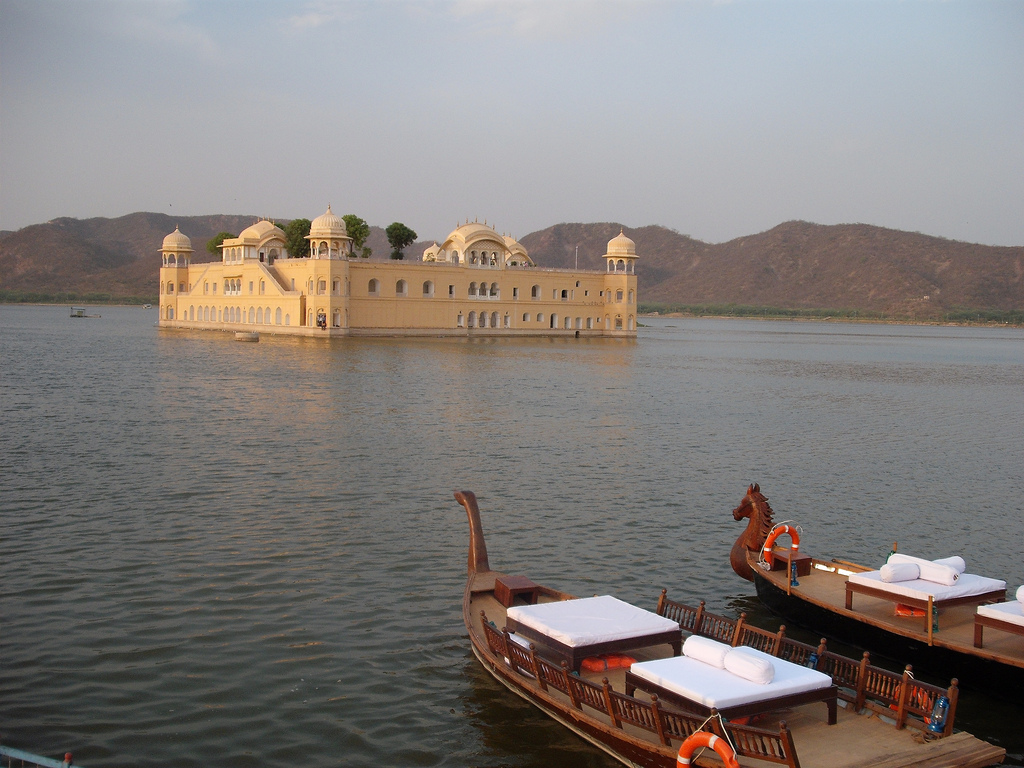
Jal Mahal in 2011, after water restoration.

In the early 2000s, an extensive public-private partnership project worth ₹1.5 billion (approximately $18 million USD) was launched to restore Jal Mahal, rehabilitate Man Sagar Lake, and develop the surrounding area. The project covered a total area of 432 acres (175 ha), which included:

- 300 acres (120 ha) of lake surface area.
- 100 acres (40 ha) of lake precincts designated for tourism development.
- 32 acres (13 ha) allocated for a public promenade, tertiary water treatment facilities, and related infrastructure.

Led by the Jaipur Development Authority (JDA) in collaboration with central government agencies, notably the Ministry of Environment and Forests, as well as private sector developer KGK Consortium, the initiative addressed decades of environmental degradation caused by urban sewage and catchment runoff.

=== Environmental and Engineering Works ===
To restore the lake's ecosystem and improve water quality, several major environmental and engineering measures were executed:

- Desilting & Landscaping: Approximately 500,000 m³ of silt was dredged from the lakebed. The material was reused to build check dams, reinforce embankments, and construct three artificial nesting grounds for migratory birds.
- Water Treatment & Bioremediation: City sewage drains were realigned, and untreated discharge from the Brahmpuri and Nagtalai drains were diverted into a newly built treatment plant. The secondary effluent was routed through a 4-hectare (9.9-acre) artificial wetland with hyacinth channels for nutrient removal. Additionally, an in-situ bioremediation system utilizing 140 diffusers and 5 air compressors was installed to aerate the lake bed.
- Infrastructure & Reforestation: A 1 km (0.62 mi) lakefront promenade and a 2.7 km (1.7 mi) road connecting Amber to Man Sagar Dam were built. Local flora such as Acacia arabica, Tamarix, Terminalia arjuna, Poplar, Neem, and Ficus species were planted along the banks to stabilize soil and expand bird habitat.

=== Tourism Precinct and Current Status ===
Following the initial ecological restoration, a joint-sector enterprise (PDCOR) was formed between the JDA and KGK Consortium to manage the site's commercial and cultural development. The broader master plan envisioned a convention center, craft village, resort hotels, public gardens, and ongoing maintenance of the monument.

However, commercial tourism development stalled following legal challenges in the Rajasthan High Court and subsequent Supreme Court rulings, which altered the lease duration to 30 years and restricted construction on wetland areas. Despite the environmental cleanup of the lake, commercial construction remains inactive, and the lower four-story interior of the palace remains closed to general visitors.

== See also ==
- List of lakes in India
- Lake Palace
- Media related to Jal Mahal at Wikimedia Commons

== Gallery ==
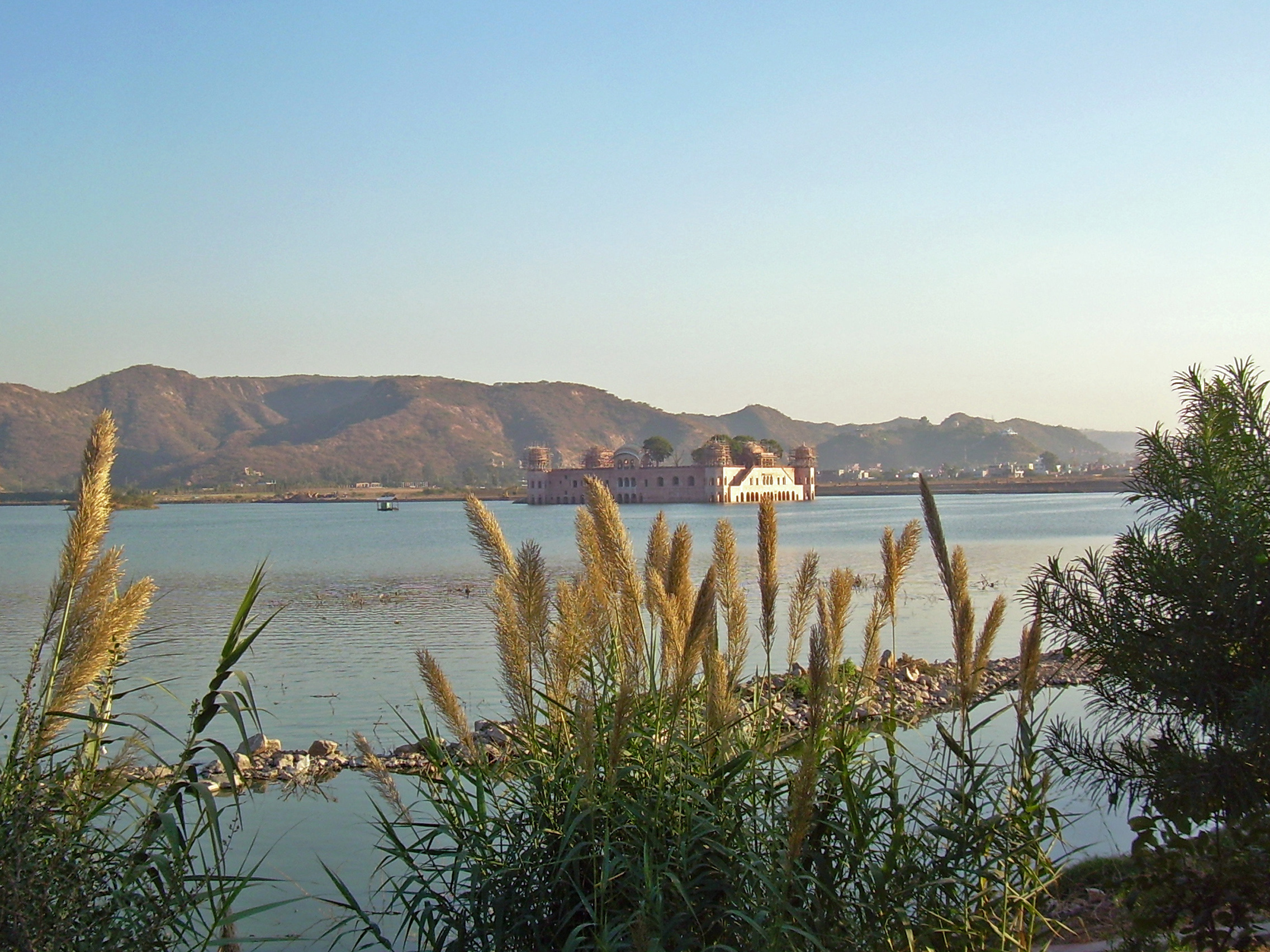
The palace amidst the lake, as seen in November 2007

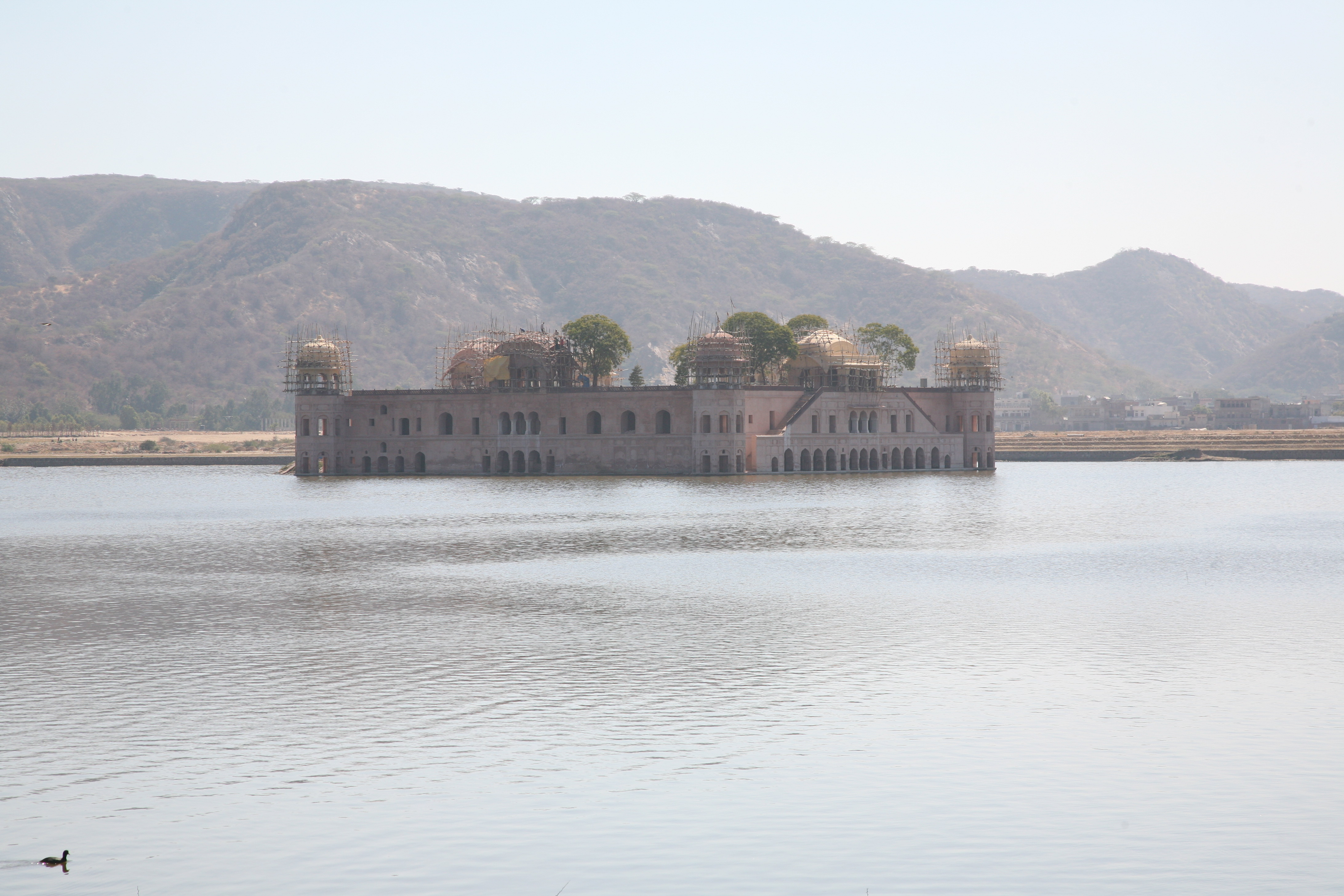
Jal Mahal under restoration, as seen in February 2008

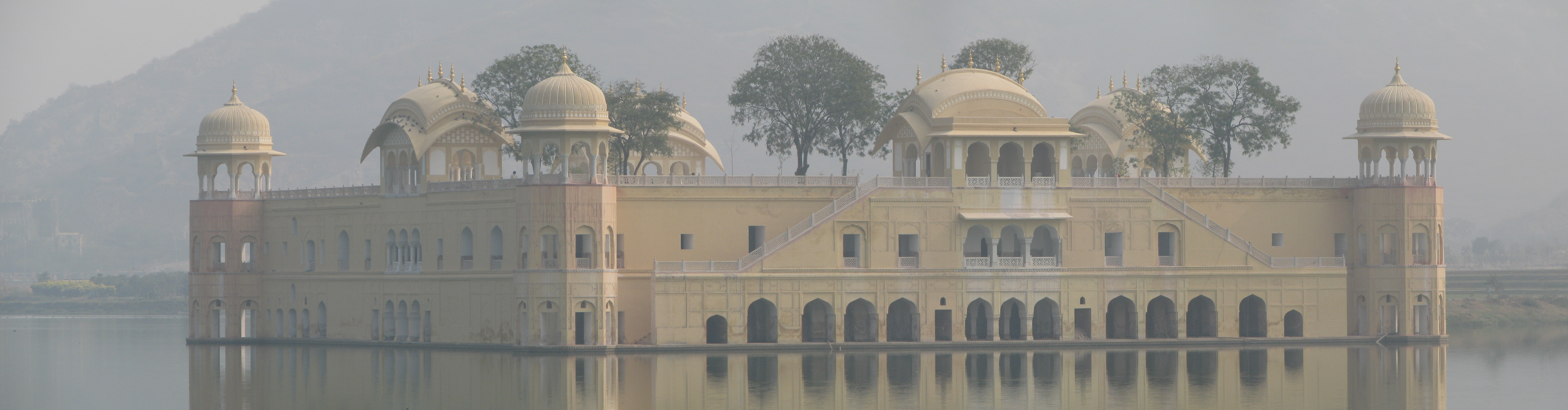
Jal Mahal after restoration, as seen in March 2008

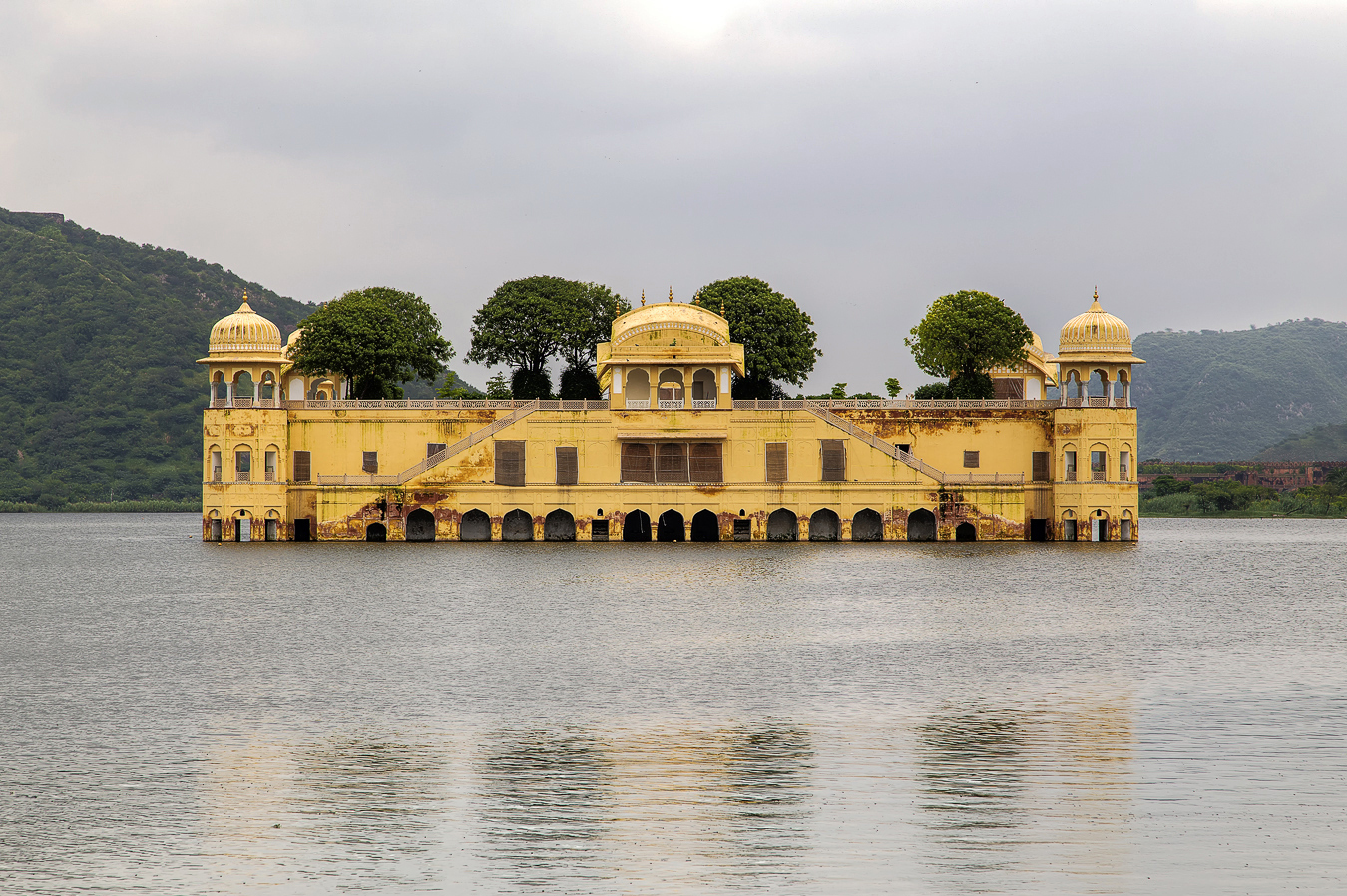
Jal Mahal during the day time

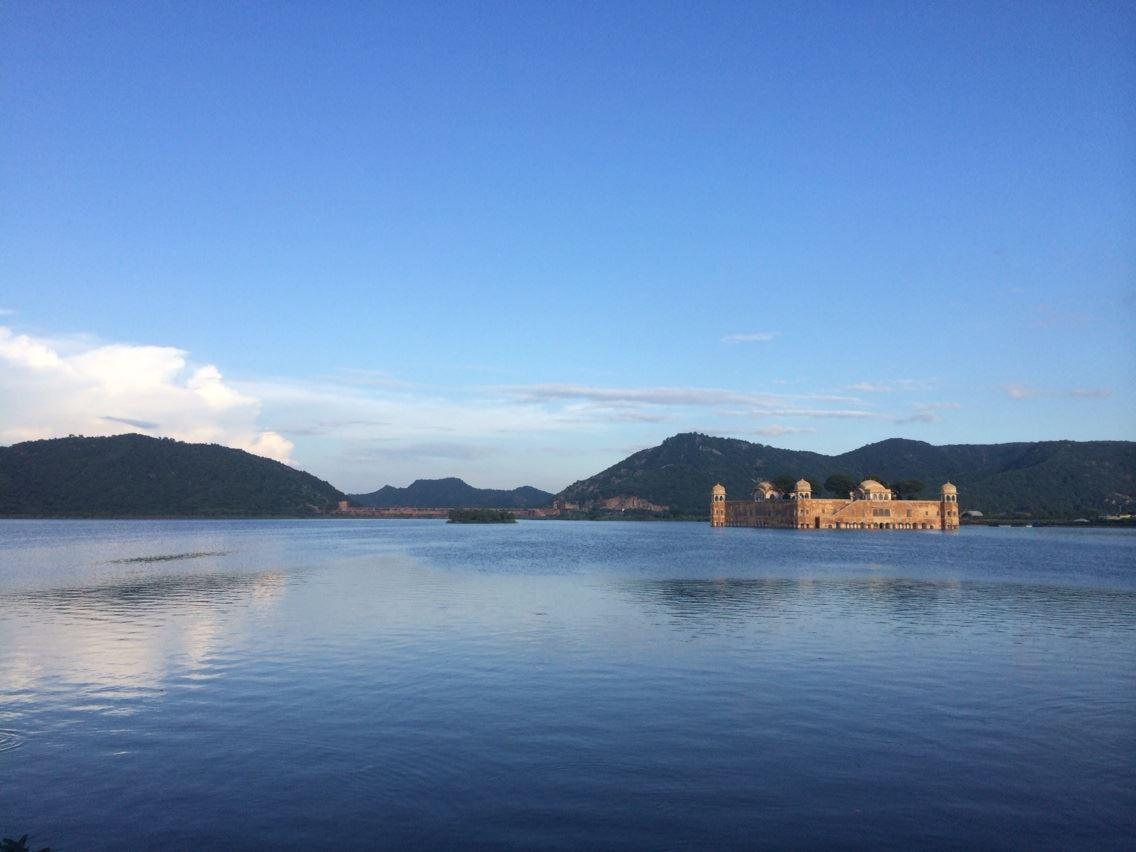
Jal Mahal in August 2014

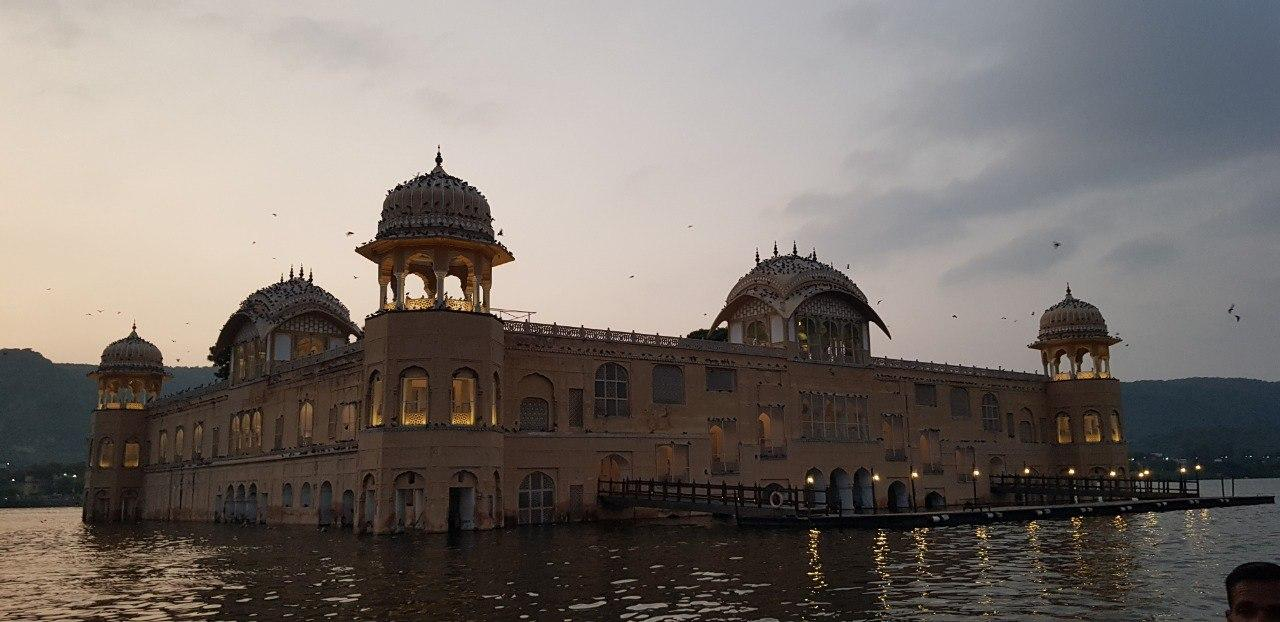
Jal Mahal close-up
