= Kanak Vrindavan =

Park in India

Coordinates: 26°57′48.83″N 75°50′50.60″E

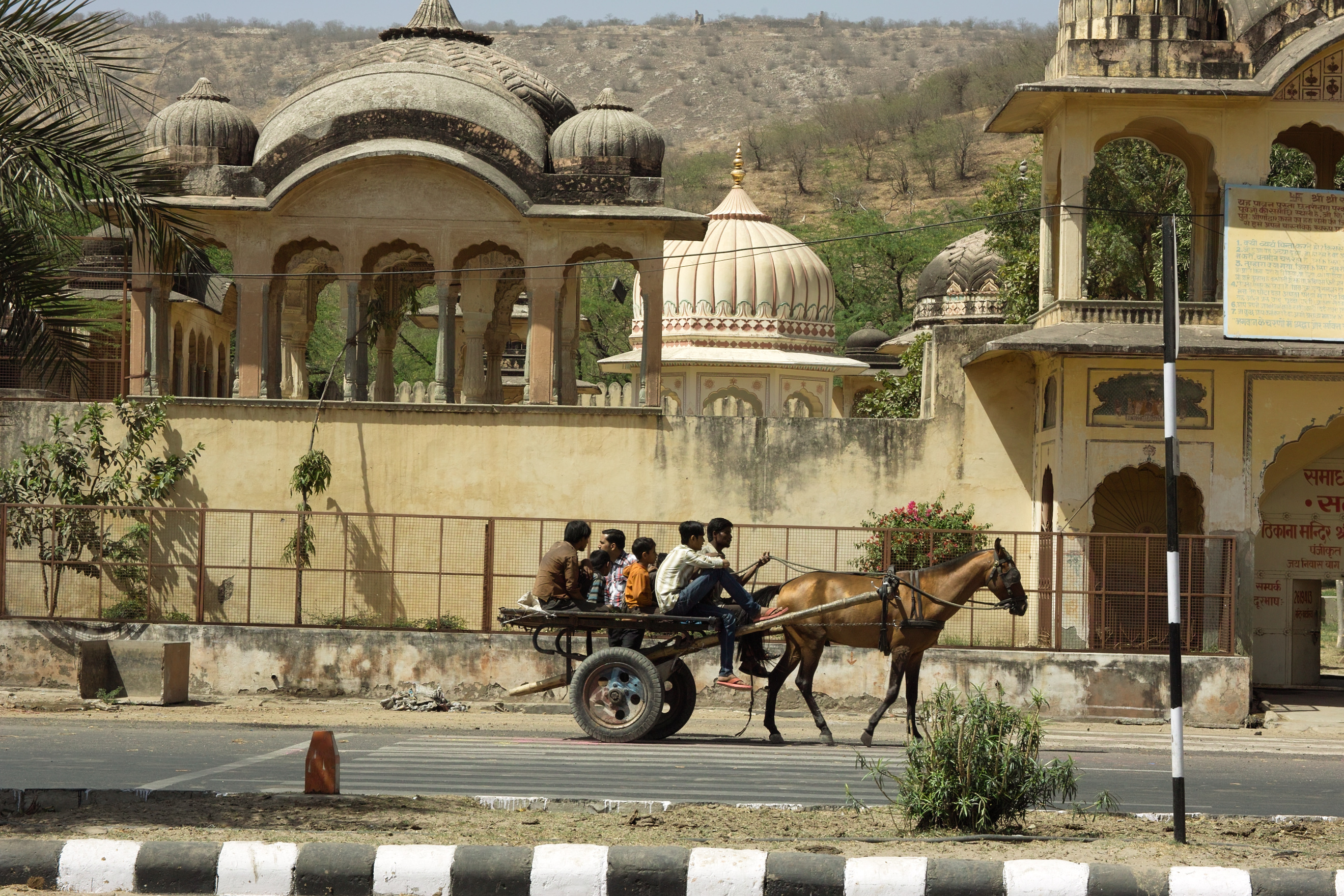
- Kanak Vrindavan Outside building along Mansagar Lake

- Location within Jaipur Location within Rajasthan Location within India
- Type: Garden
- Location: Amer Road, Jaipur, Rajasthan
- Opened: 8.00 to 17.00 hrs
- Operator: Govt. of Rajasthan
- Status: Lord Krishna & Gopis

Kanak Vrindavan is a garden in Jaipur, the capital of Rajasthan. It is built in a valley surrounded by the Aravali Hills and is located on the way to the Amer Fort at the bottom of the Nahargarh hill. The place is approximately 8 kilometers north of Jaipur . The garden has many nearby tourist attractions such as the Amer fort Palace, Jaigarh fort and Nahargarh Fort along with lush greenery.

The garden was commissioned by Kachchwaha Rajput Maharaja Sawai Jai Singh of Jaipur, approximately 275 years ago, at the time when the complex was built. It includes the term 'Vrindavan' as the garden resembles the descriptions of the place, where God Sri Krishna had performed MahaRaas near Mathura, and word Kanak came from Maharaja's one of the Maharani Kanakde. This garden is compared to the valley of Vrindavan and the maharaja, consecrated an idol of Sri Krishna in a temple in the Kanak Vrindavan valley called the Shri Govind Deoji Parisar.

The garden consists of a temple, a series of fountains and intricate marble decorations. It is managed by the Government of Rajasthan.

== History ==
The Kanak Vrindavan Valley Complex was built approximately 275 years ago by Maharaja Sawai Jai Singh of Jaipur. This greenery filled valley is surrounded by the Aravalli hills and often said to resemble the Vrindavan; the place where Lord Krishna enjoyed the Maharaas with Gopis. The Kanak Vrindavan Valley was built for the entertainment and recreation of Maharani and the Maharaja.

According to some people the Maharaja planned for an Ashvamedha Yagna and arranged waters from sacred rivers to collect here. A Lord Krishna Temple named Govind Deoji was also built around the same time.

== Architecture ==
The Kanak Vrindavan Garden is located in the valley of the Nahargarh hills. It is full of trees and lawns, decorated with intricate 'chhatris', mirrors and 'jali' work on the walls of the Govind Deoji temple, along with a support of a series of fountains.

The main garden is divided into eight sections, and is having a main fountain called 'Parikrama', carved out of a single marble slab. Temple Garbha Griha is also placed inside the temple parisar (complex) and is decorated with delicate 'panni' work. These all season green gardens at the Valley offer a view of Jaipur and other nearby attractions mainly Amer Fort and the Dharbawati River. The scenery has been used a number of times in many Bollywood films, such as Lamhe (1991).

Some nearby attractions include:

- Amer Fort, Jal Mahal
- Elephant Park
- Nahargarh fort
- Jaigarh Fort.
