= Jaivana Cannon =

Large historic artillery weapon in Rajasthan, India

The Jaivana Cannon (Hindi: जयवाण) is a large 18th-century cannon preserved at Jaigarh Fort, in Rajasthan, India. At the time of its manufacture in 1720, it was the world's largest cannon on wheels.

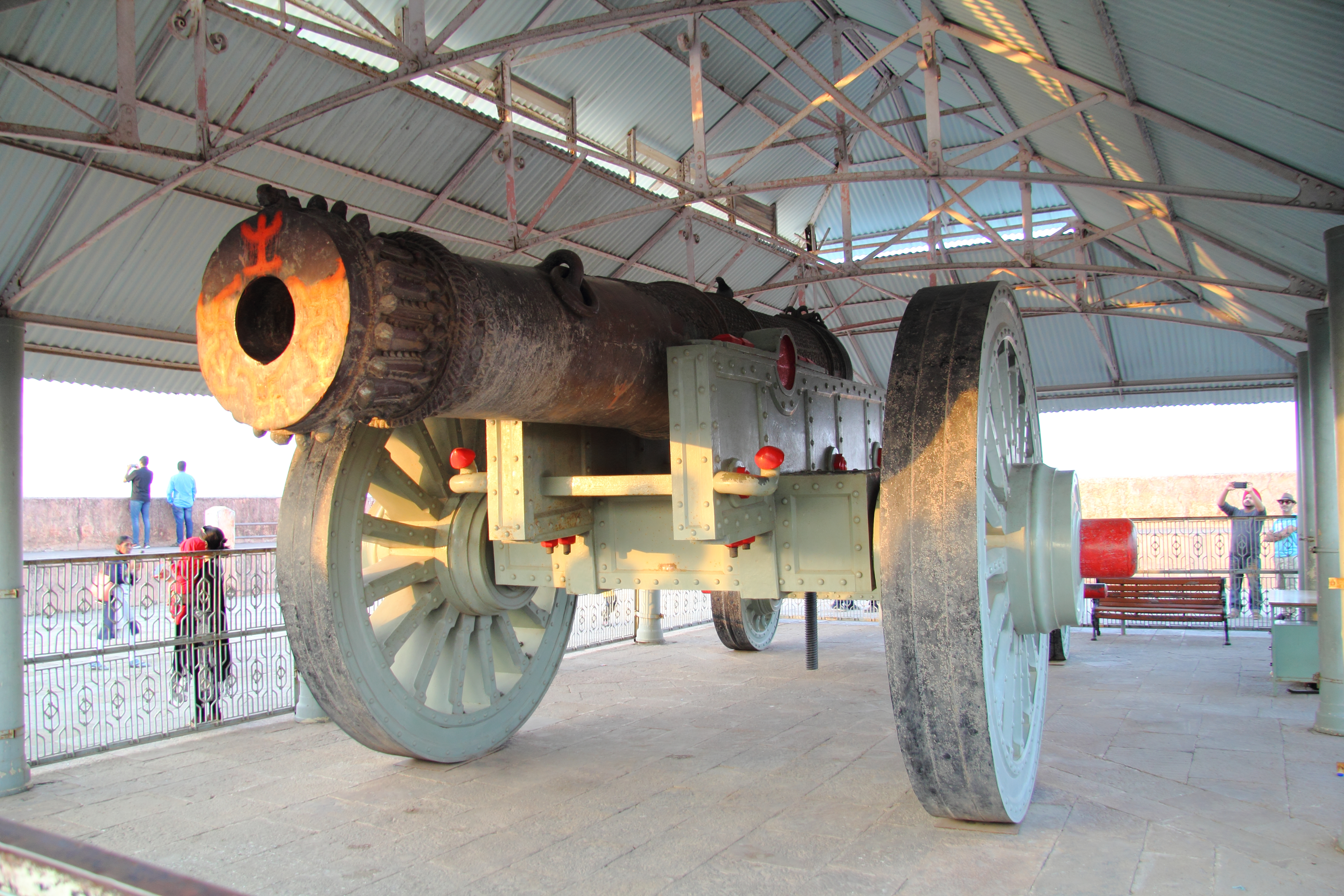
Jaivana Cannon

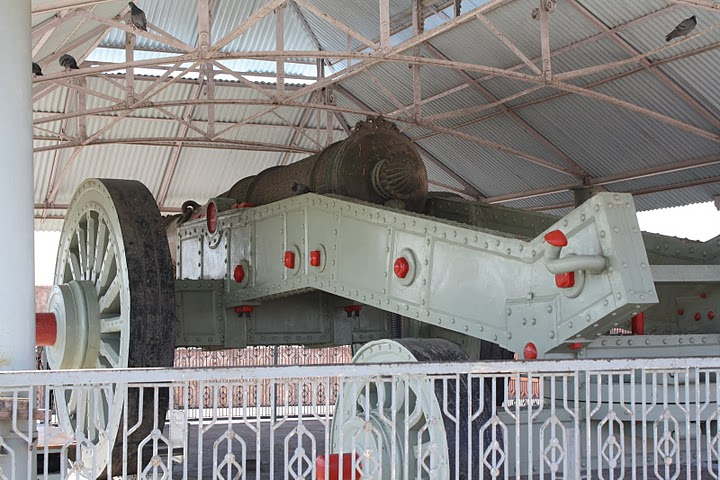
The cannon from the rear

== History ==
The Jaivana was manufactured during the reign of Maharaja Sawai Jai Singh II (1699–1743) at a foundry in Jaigarh. The cannon was fired only once, with a charge of 100 kilograms (220 lb) of gunpowder, and when fired was claimed to have covered a distance of about 35 kilometres (22 mi). It is said that the projectile fired from it made a small lake in Chaksu, though this is clearly an embellished legend and could not have physically happened. The cannon is now located at the Jaigarh Fort, Jaipur, at 26°58′48.03″N 75°50′37.29″E.

== Technical data ==
The length of the barrel of the cannon is 6.15 m (20.2 ft) and it weighs 50 tons. The circumference near the tip of the barrel is 2.2 m (7.2 ft) and that of the rear is 2.8 m (9.2 ft). The diameter of the bore of the barrel is 28 cm (11 in) and the thickness of the barrel at the tip is 21.6 cm (8.5 in). The thickness gradually increases as one moves towards the rear of the barrel. The two thick rings on the barrel were used for lifting it with the help of a crane which, though incomplete, is still lying in Jaigarh. A 776-millimetre-long (30.6 in) elevating screw was used for raising and lowering the barrel.

The barrel has floral design. An elephant rests on the tip of the barrel and a pair of peacocks are carved in the centre. A pair of ducks also decorates the rear of the barrel.

Jaivana rests on a high two-wheeled carriage. The wheels are 1.37 m (4.5 ft) in diameter. The carriage is equipped with two removable additional wheels for transport. The removable wheels are 2.74 m (9.0 ft) in diameter. It is mounted on wheels and has the mechanism of two back wheels mounted on roller pin bearings, to turn it 360° and fire in any direction. A tin shed was built to protect the cannon against weather.

About 100 kg (220 lb) of gunpowder fired a shot ball weighing 50 kg (110 lb).

The uses and range of the cannon and cannonballs vary over different sources.

The Jaivana Cannon was only fired once by Jai Singh II, as a test-fire in 1720. The most exaggerated myth claims that the weapon had a range of 40 km (25 mi), other sources say it is 35, 22 and 11 km (6.8 mi), although the exact range could perhaps never be determined without adequate scientific computation. Most sources, including local tourist guides agree that it was fired in the direction of Chaksu. The impact is said by many locals and tourist guides to be powerful enough to have caused a depression where a pond can be seen today. Legend has it that after it fired, pregnant women living nearby suffered miscarriages.

Jaivana Cannon

== See also ==
- Tsar Cannon
- List of the largest cannon by caliber
- The Pride and the Passion, a 1957 fictional historical film drama with a large siege cannon that has a nearly identical carriage and similar size barrel.
