= Nahargarh Fort =

Historic military fortress in Rajasthan, India

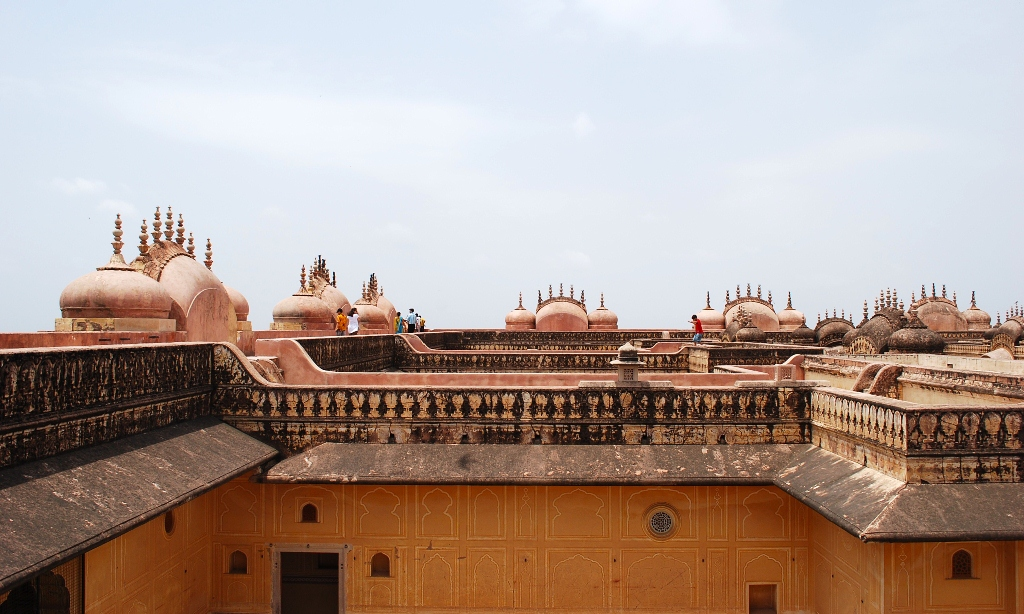
- Roof Terrace of the Fort

- Location within Jaipur Location within Rajasthan
- 26.937255°N 75.815490°E
- Location: Jaipur, Rajasthan

History
- Built: 1734

Site notes
- Elevation: 213 m (700 feet)

Nahargarh Fort stands on the edge of the Aravalli Hills, overlooking the city of Jaipur in the Indian state of Rajasthan. Along with Amber Fort and Jaigarh Fort, Nahargarh once formed a strong defence ring for the city. The fort was originally named Sudershangarh, but it became known as Nahargarh, which means 'abode of tigers'. The popular belief is that Nahar here stands for Nahar Singh Bhomia, whose spirit haunted the place and obstructed construction of the fort. Nahar's spirit was pacified by building a temple in his memory within the fort, which thus became known by his name.

== History ==
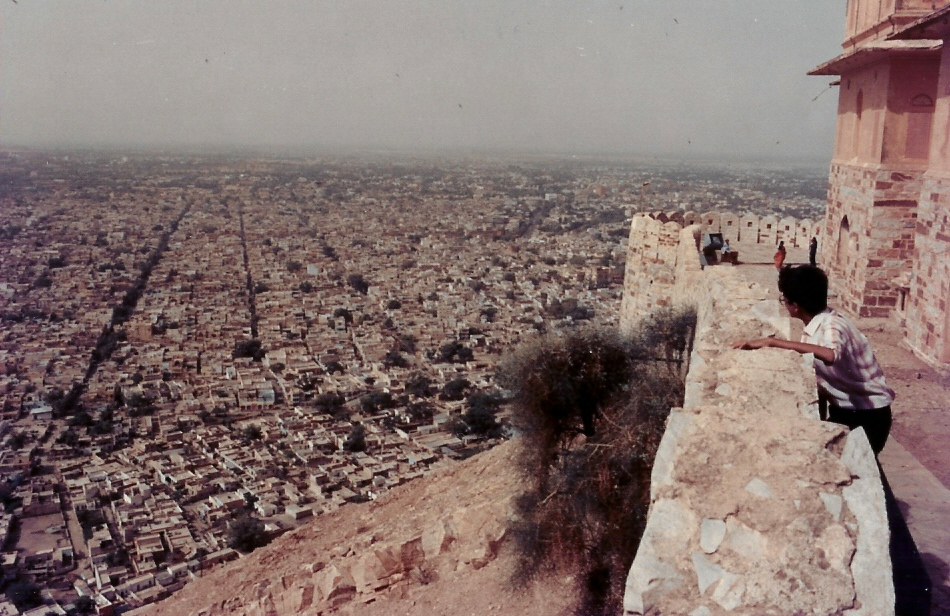
Jaipur city from Nahargarh Fort

Built mainly in 1734 by Maharaja Sawai Jai Singh, the king of Jaipur, the fort was constructed as a place of retreat on the summit of the ridge above the city. Walls extended over the surrounding hills, forming fortifications that connected this fort to Jaigarh, the fort above the old capital of Amber. Though the fort never came under attack during its history, it did see some historical events, notably, including treaties with the Maratha forces who warred with Jaipur in the 18th century. During the Indian Mutiny of 1857, the Europeans of the region, including the British Resident's wife, were moved to Nahargarh fort by Sawai Ram Singh, the king of Jaipur, for their protection.

The fort was extended in 1868, during the reign of Sawai Ram Singh. In 1883–92, a range of palaces was built at Nahargarh by Dirgh Patel at a cost of nearly three and a half lakh rupees. The Madhavendra Bhawan, built by Sawai Madho Singh had suites for the queens of Jaipur and at the head was a suite for the king himself. The rooms are linked by corridors and still have some delicate frescoes. Nahargarh was also a hunting residence of the Maharajas.

Until April 1944, the Jaipur State government used for its official purposes solar time read from the Samrat Yantra in the Jantar Mantar Observatory, with a gun fired from Nahargarh Fort as the time signal.

Some scenes in the films Rang De Basanti, Shuddh Desi Romance and Sonar Kella were shot at Nahargarh Fort.

== Visitation ==
The ticket for the historical fort of Nahargarh costs ₹52 for Indian nationals. For foreign tourists, the cost goes up to ₹600 (US$6.20). Students enjoy discounted prices. For foreign students, the ticket costs ₹50 (52¢ US), and ₹22 for Indian students.

Nahargarh Fort is open from 10:00, and the gates of the fort closes in the evening at 21.30 The visitors are not advised to stay any later than that because the fort is surrounded by dense deciduous forest. The forest is part of Nahargarh Biological Park and home to many wild animals.

== Gallery ==
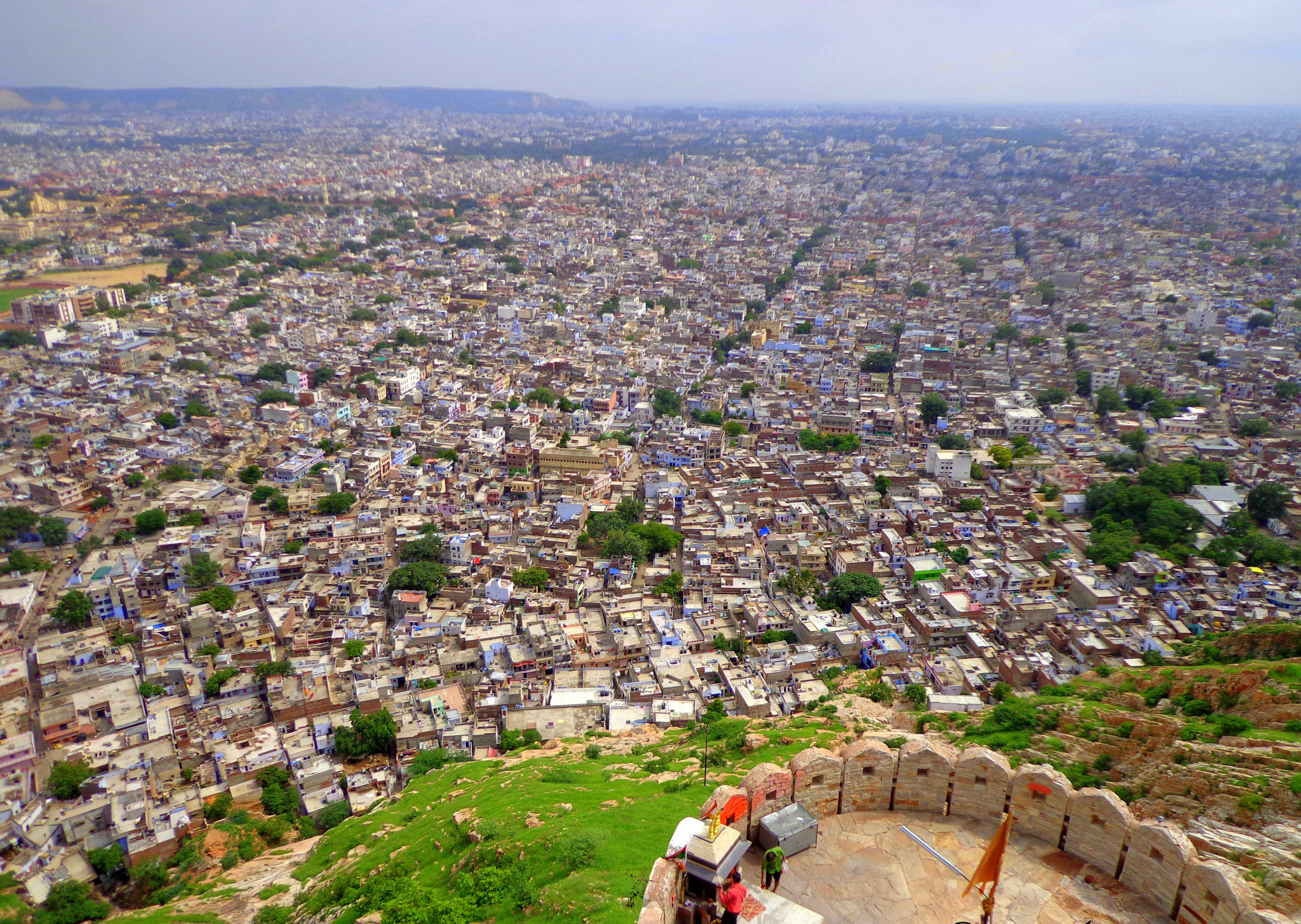
City of Jaipur seen from Nahargarh Fort

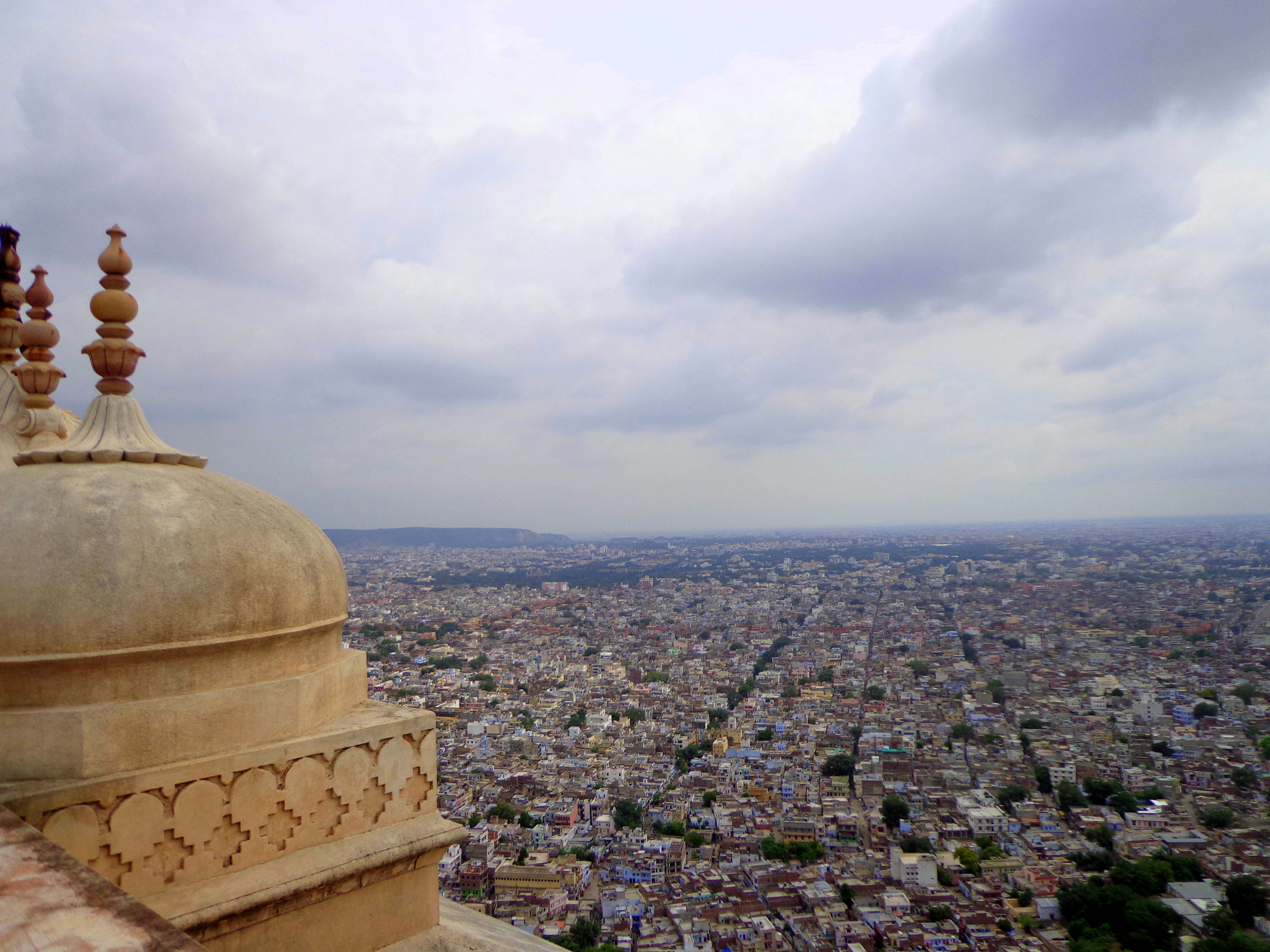
City of Jaipur seen from Nahargarh Fort

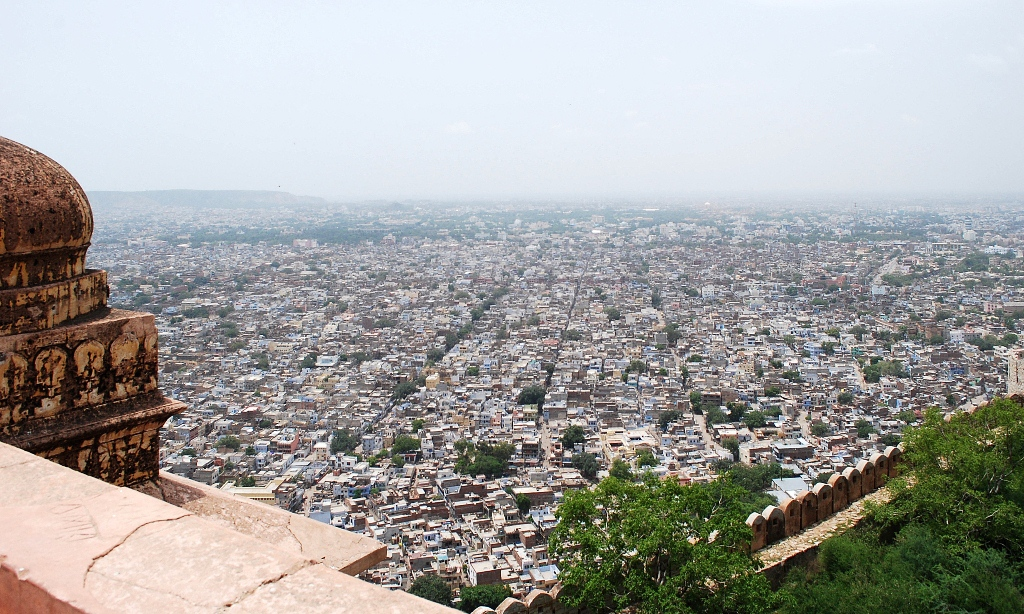
City of Jaipur seen from Nahargarh Fort

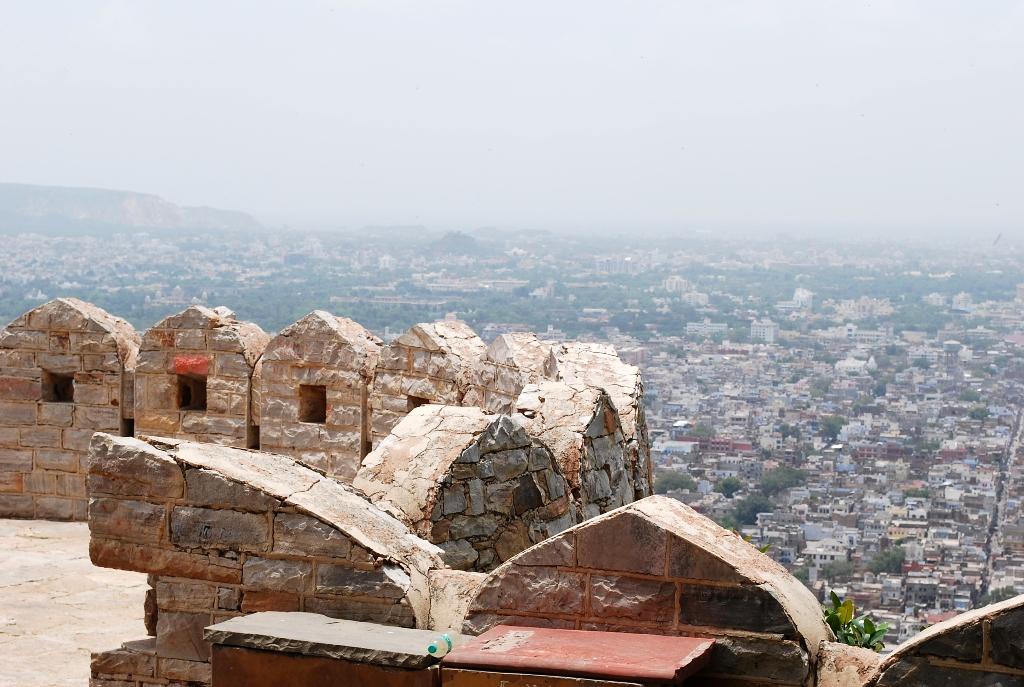
Stone Railing on Roof Terrace

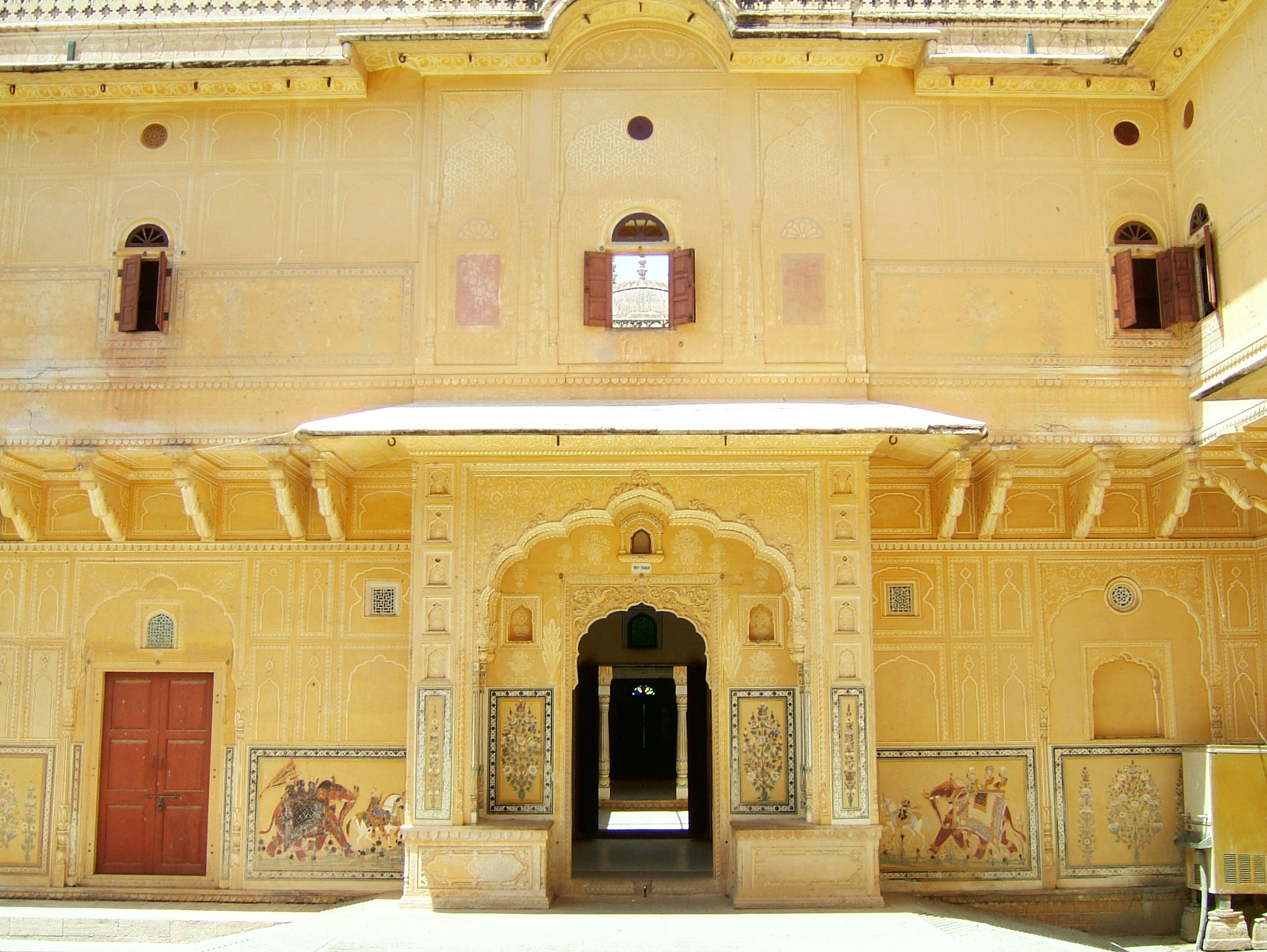
Nahargarh Fort compound Jaipur, Rajasthan

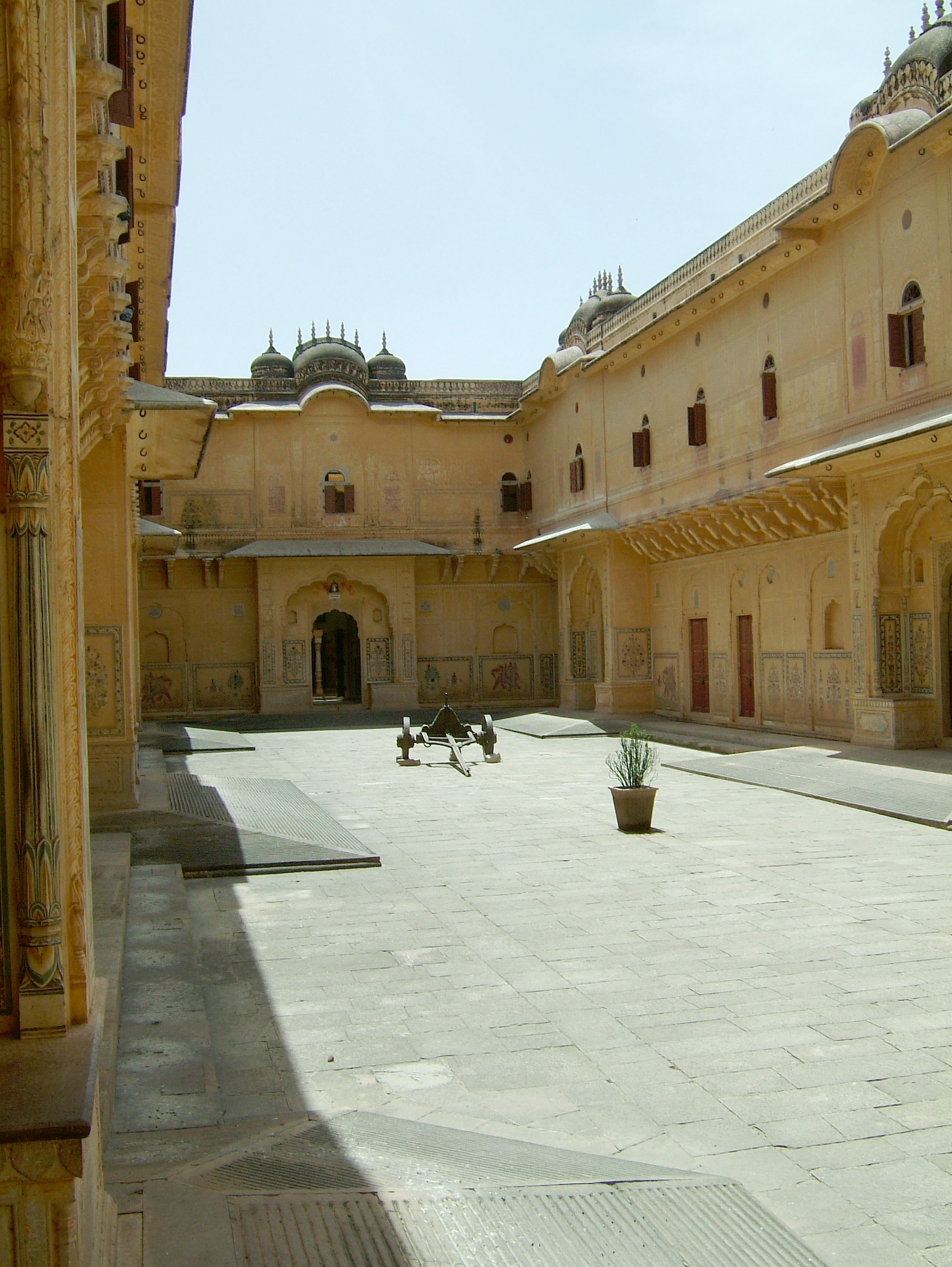
Nahargarh Fort compound Jaipur, Rajasthan

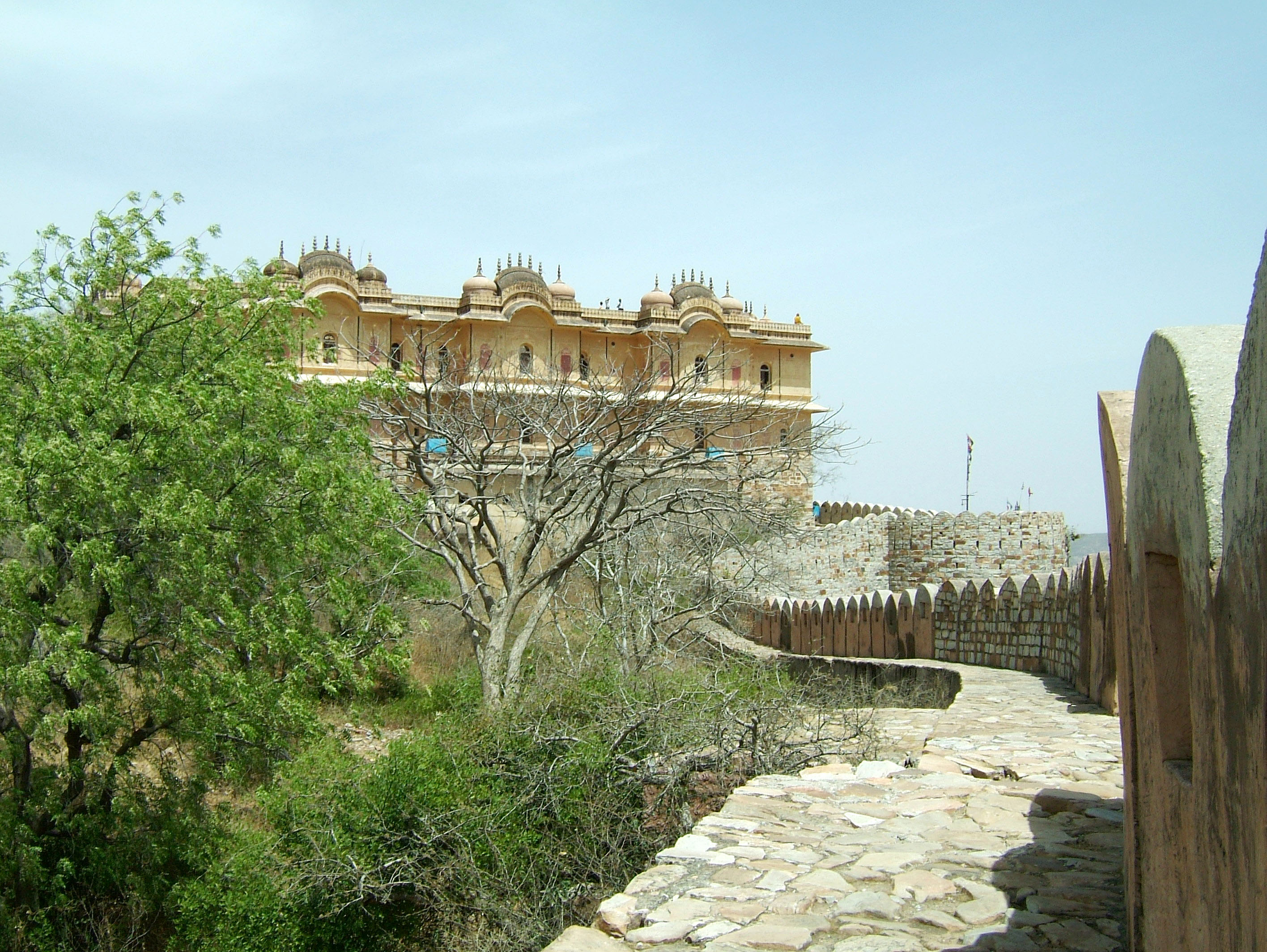
Nahargarh Fort compound Jaipur, Rajasthan

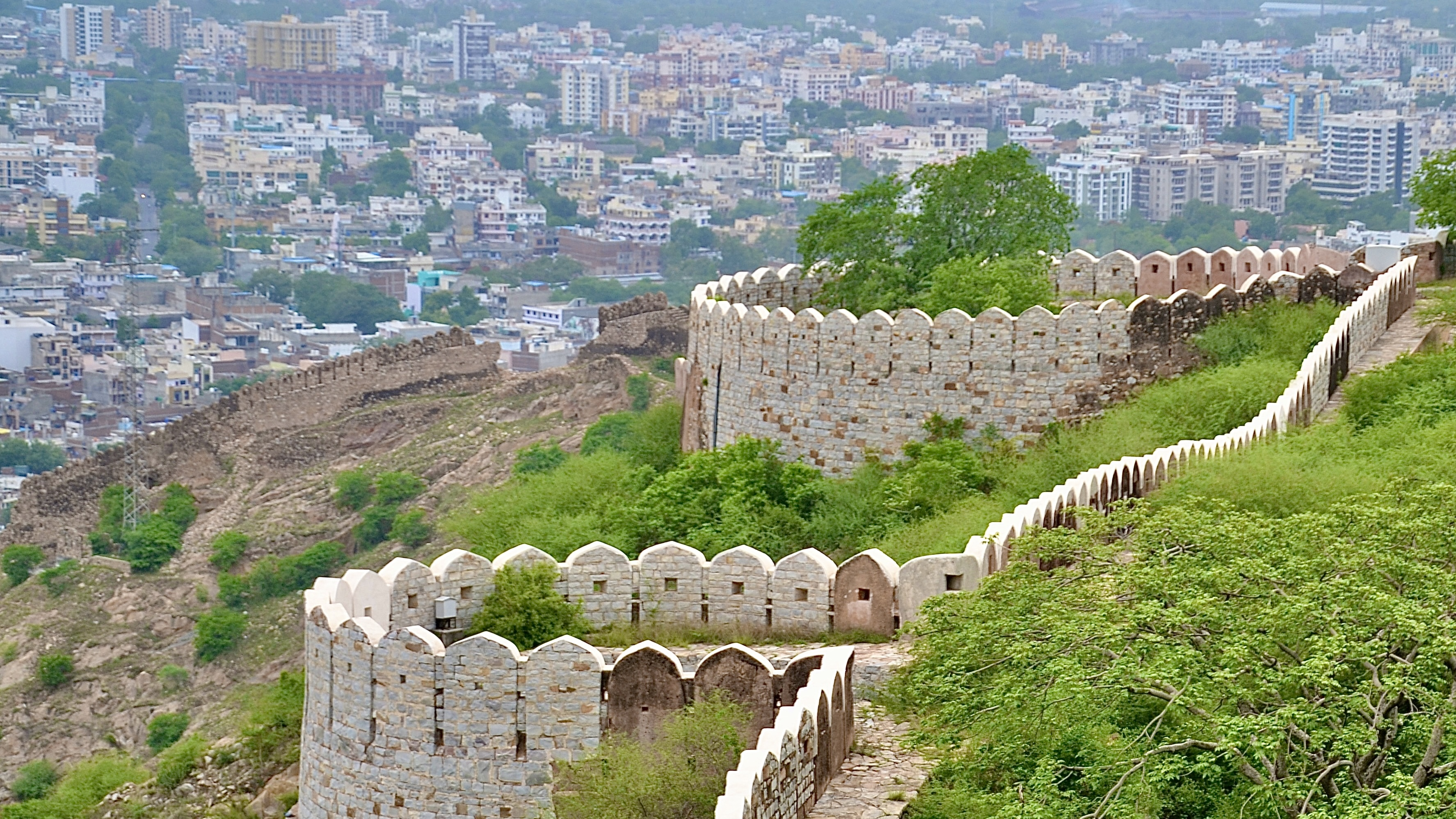
Walls and city visible from the fort

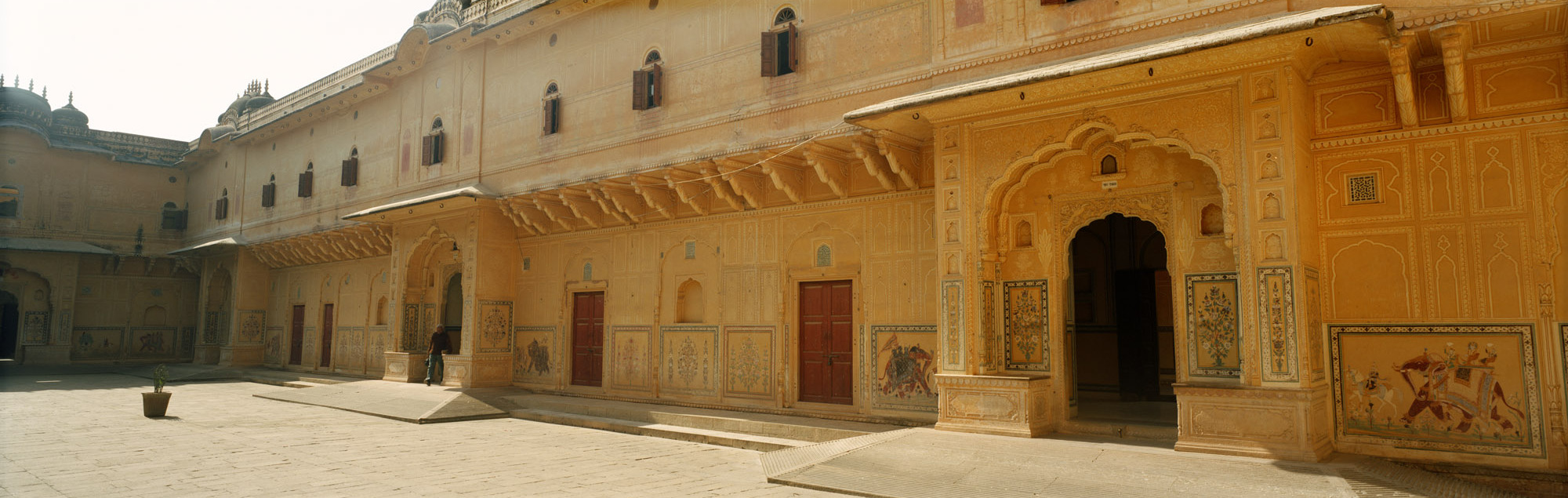
Nahargarh Fort, Madhvendra Palace

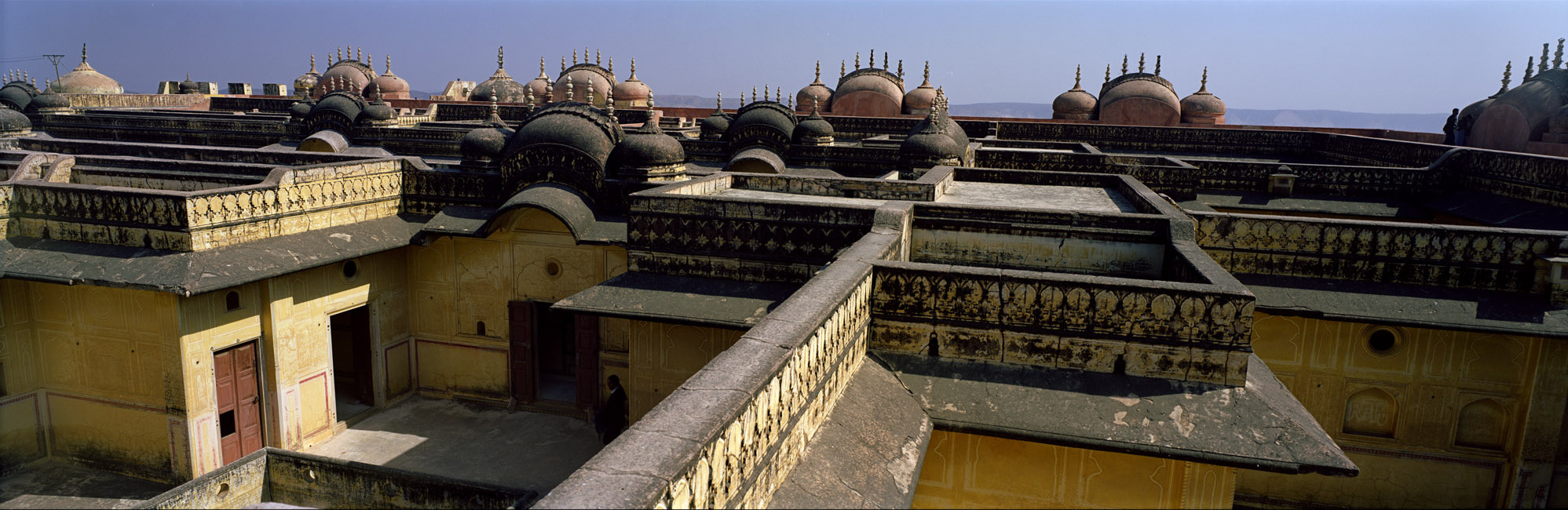
Madhvendra Palace

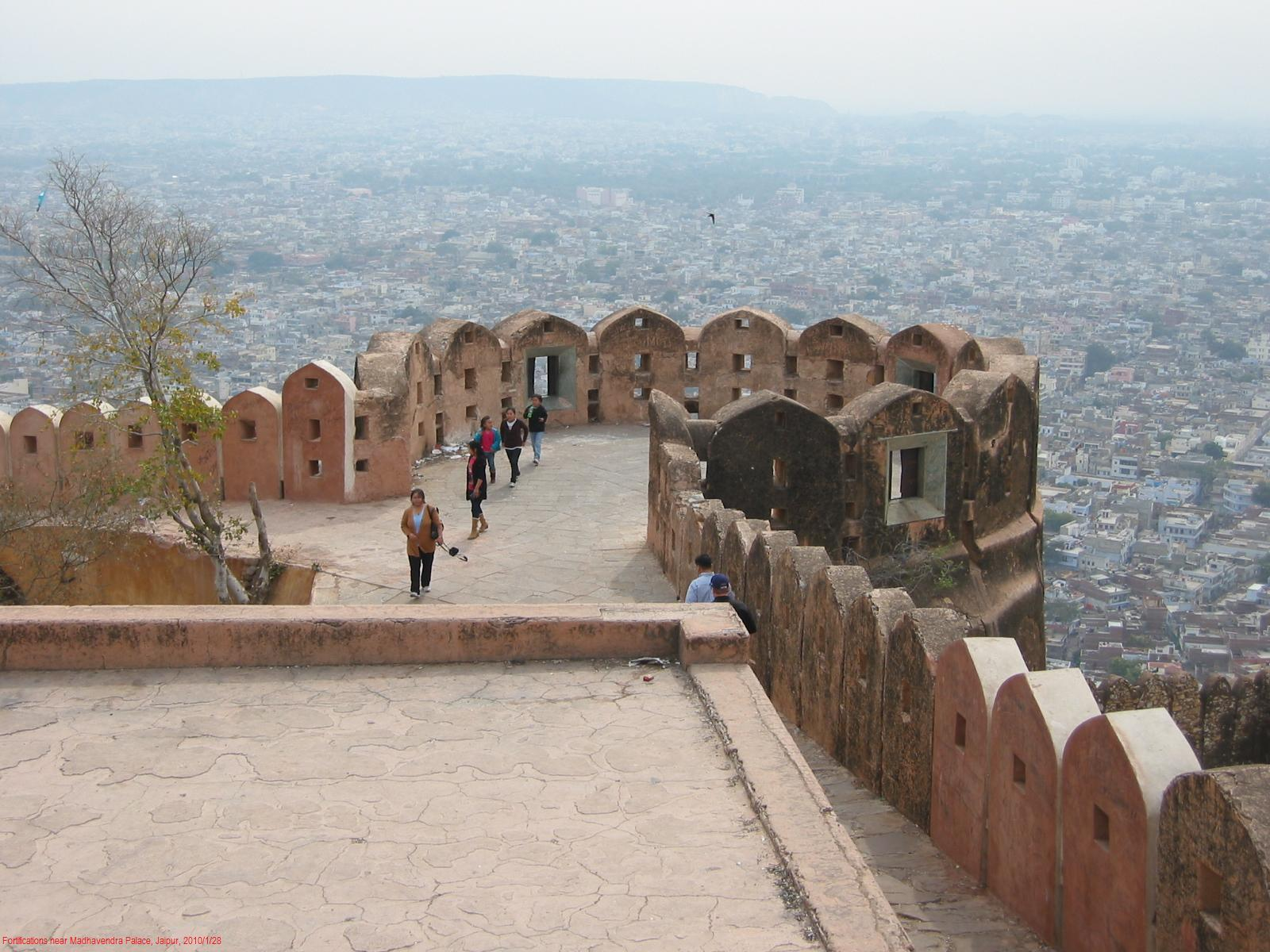
A bastion at Nahargarh Fort, complete with cannon embrasures and gunports for small arms in the merlons

== Nearby attractions ==
- Kanak Vrindavan
- Jantar Mantar
- Jaigarh Fort
- Amer Fort
- City Palace
- Hawa Mahal
- Jal Mahal

== See also ==
- Nahargarh Biological Park
