= Jaigarh Fort =

Historic military fortress in Rajasthan, India

Jaigarh Fort Victory Fort
- Part of Jaipur
- Amer, Rajasthan, India
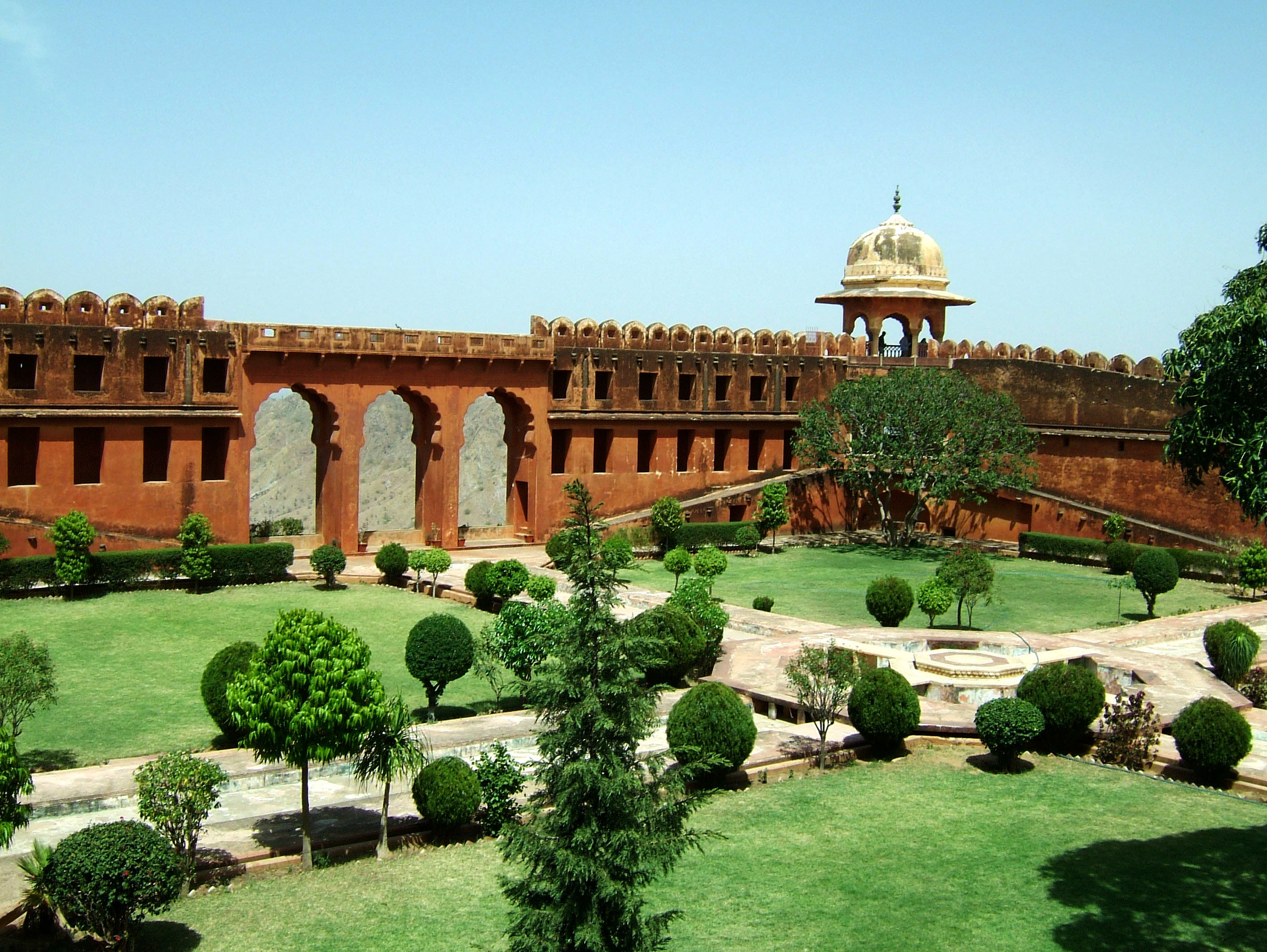
- Jaigarh Fort

Site information
- Type: Fort
- Controlled by: Jaigarh Public Charitable Trust
- Open to the public: Yes
- Condition: Good

Location
- India
- Location within Jaipur Location within Rajasthan
- Coordinates: 26.9859°N 75.8507°E

Site history
- Materials: Red Sandstone
- Battles/wars: 436
- Events: Death of Dara Shikoh

Garrison information
- Past commanders: Shazada Jalal Muhammad Mirza Mughal Empire

Jaigarh Fort is situated on the promontory called the Cheel ka Teela (Hill of Eagles) of the Aravalli range; it overlooks the Amer Fort and the Maota Lake, near Amer in Jaipur, Rajasthan, India.

Raja Kakil Dev captured the Amber region from the Mina tribes and began construction of Jaigarh fort around the middle of the eleventh century. Over the centuries, the Fort was augmented by subsequent rulers, including Maha Raja Jai Singh II, who added palace apartments to the complex.

The fort, which is rugged and similar in structural design to Amer Fort, is also known as Victory Fort. It has a length of 3 kilometres (1.9 mi) along the north–south direction and a width of 1 kilometre (0.62 mi). The fort features a cannon named "Jaivana" (Jaivana Cannon), which was manufactured in the fort precincts and was then the world's largest cannon on wheels. Jaigarh Fort and Amer Fort are connected by subterranean passages and are considered as one complex.

== Geography ==
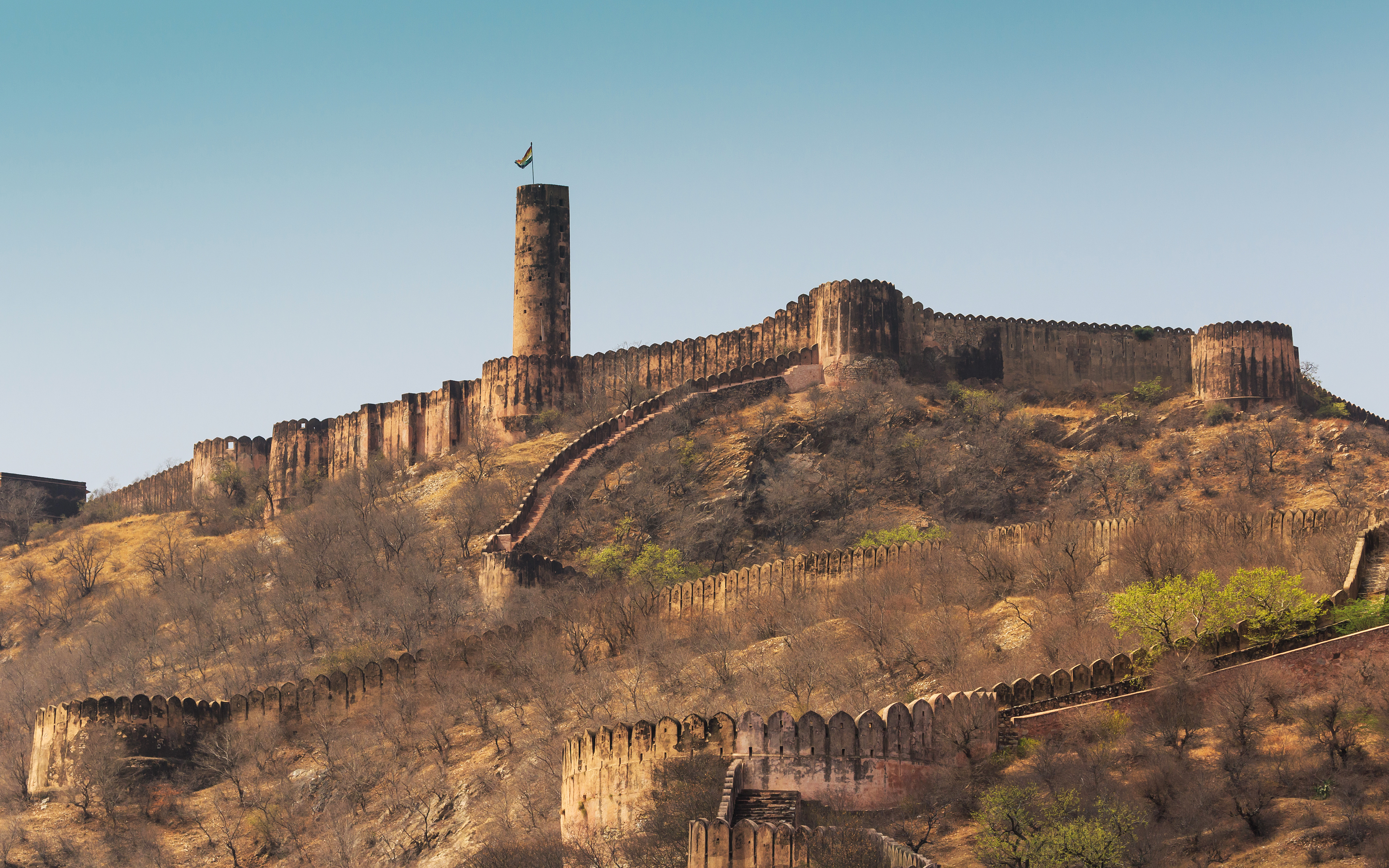
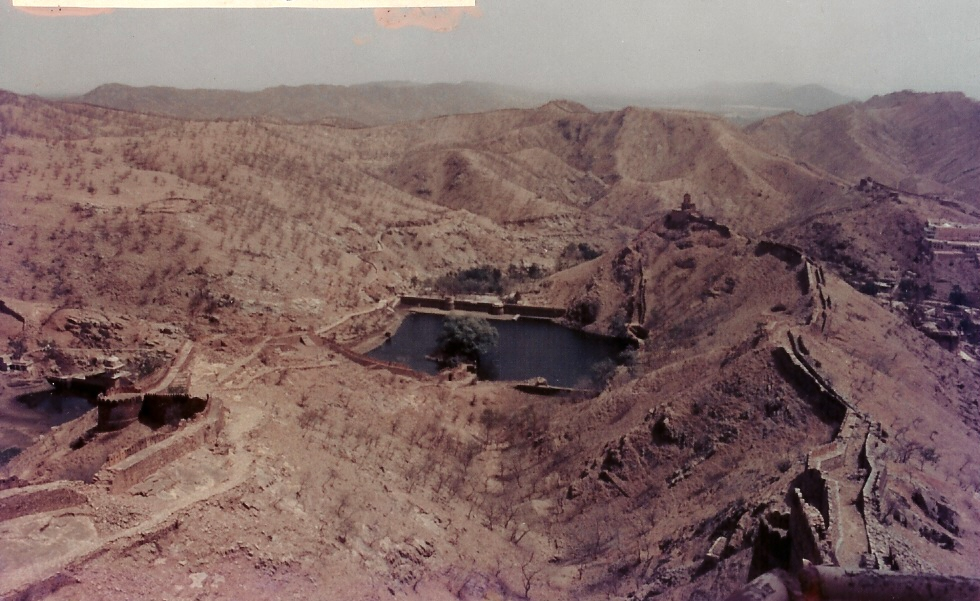
Left: Jaigarh Fort as seen from the Amer Fort. Right: View of Aravalli Hills from Jaigarh Fort

The Jaigarh Fort, located on one of the peaks of the Aravalli range of hills is built about 400 m above the Amer Fort. It provides an excellent of view of Aravalli hills and the Amer Fort down below.

The fort is 10 kilometres (6.2 mi) away from Jaipur city. It stands on a short diversion from the Jaipur-Delhi Highway, which leads to the Jaivaan cannon at the Dungar Darwaza ('Darwaza' means "gate"), the same road leads to another important fort called the Nahargarh Fort. It can also be approached from the Amer Fort over a short climb along a steep hill track, arriving at the Awami Gate near the fort museum.

== History ==
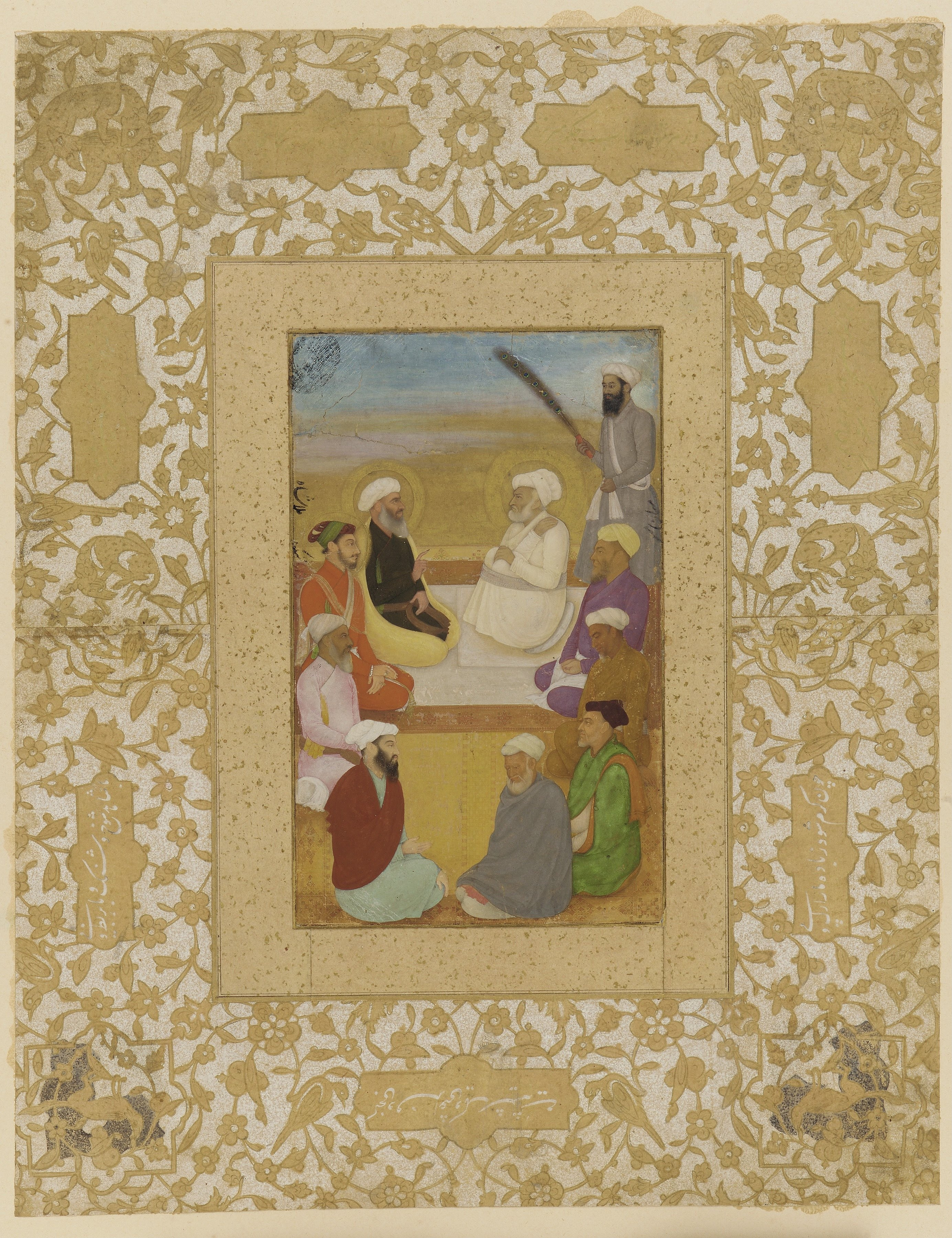
Dara Shikoh secured the high impregnable Mughal Cannon outpost of Jaigarh Fort, in the year 1658 during the Mughal war of succession.

Amer was known in the ancient and medieval period as Dhundhar (meaning attributed to a sacrificial mount in the western frontiers). which was ruled by Meenas before 10th century AD. What is known in the present day as Jaigarh Fort, which was actually the main defensive structure rather than the palace itself. The two structures are interconnected by a series of encompassing fortifications and ruled by the Kachwahas from the 10th century onwards. The history of Amer and Jaigarh is indelibly linked to these rulers, as they founded their empire at Amer.

== Cannon foundry ==
During the reign of the Mughal Emperor Shah Jahan, Jaigarh Fort, which is located 150 miles south-west of Delhi, became one of the world's most efficient cannon foundries mainly due to the abundance of iron ore mines in the vicinity of the fort. The cannon foundry Jaigarh Fort had a massive wind tunnel that sucked air from the high mountains into its furnace creating temperatures as high as 2,400 °F (1,320 °C), the heated air would melt the metal. The molten metal would fill a reservoir chamber and pass into a cannon mold in the casting pit. Most of those cannons were massive, mostly 16 ft long and had to be prepared within a single day. The Rajput also built a large ingenious mechanical device that had a precision gear system driven by four pairs of oxen, the device was used for hollowing out the cannon barrels. When the Mughal war of succession broke out in 1658 Dara Shikoh secured the cannon outpost of Jaigarh Fort until he was defeated and executed by his younger brother Aurangzeb. Later however, the Mughal Emperor Muhammad Shah appointed Jai Singh II as the official Mughal quiladar of Jaigarh Fort according to a Firman, ultimately Jai Singh II is known to have molded the great Jaivana Cannon by utilizing the important foundry and devices inside Jaigarh Fort.

== Description ==
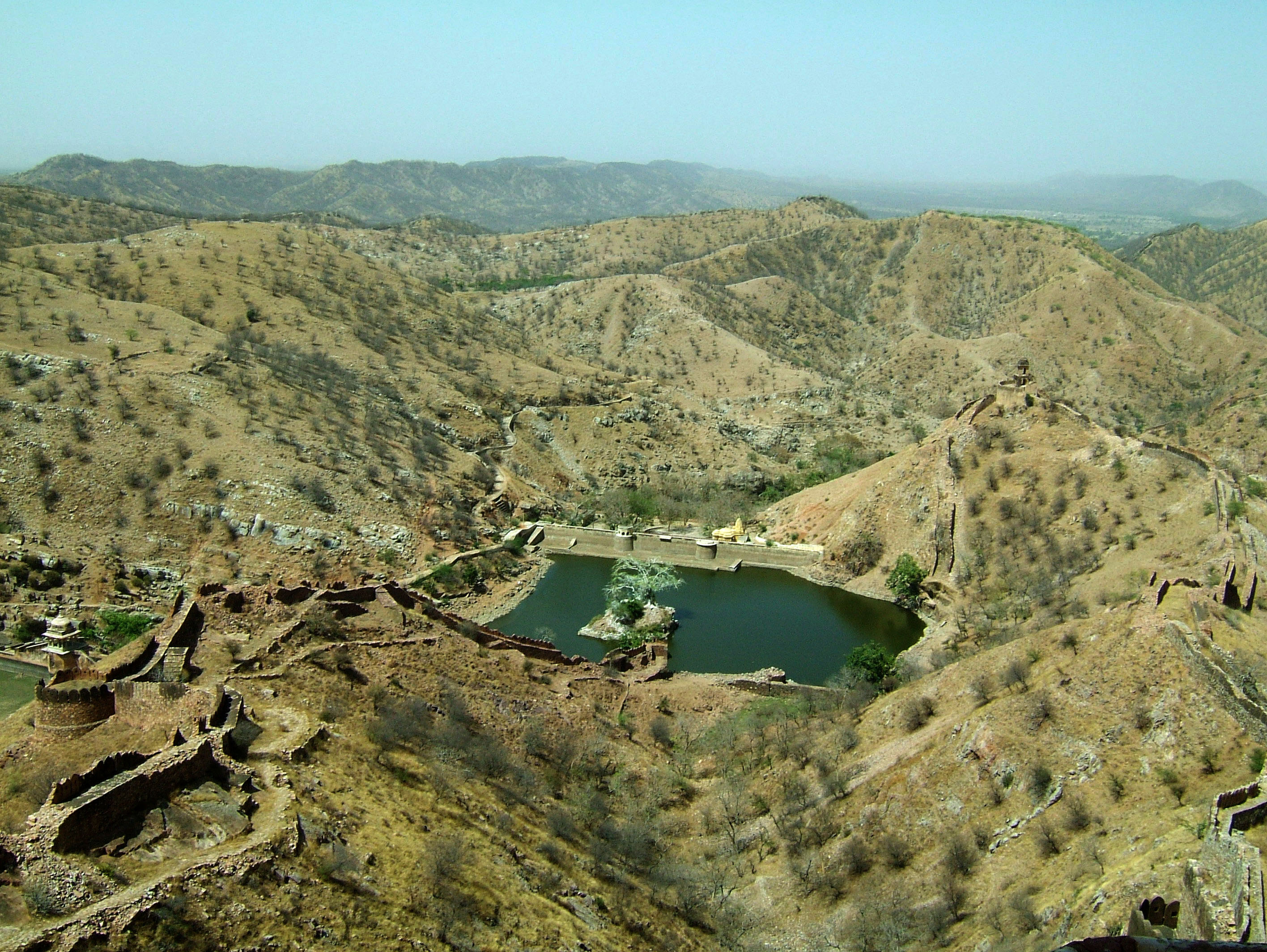
Jaigarh Fort water supply

The fort is highly fortified with thick walls of red sandstone and is spread over a layout plan with a length of 3 kilometres (1.9 mi) and a width of 1 kilometre (0.62 mi); it has an impressive square garden (50 metres (160 ft) square) within it. Ramparts in each corner are sloping and provide access to the upper level structures. The palaces have court rooms and halls with screened windows. A central watch tower on a raised ground provides excellent vistas of the surrounding landscape. The Aram Mandir and the garden within its courtyard, on the northern side of the fort complex, has a triple arched entrance "The Awani Darwaza" which was refurbished in recent times to get fine views of the Sagar Lake (an artificial lake); water from this lake used to be transported to the fort in pouches loaded on elephant backs and also by humans carrying water pots. The triple arch gateway with fortification walls above it is painted red and yellow. It is oriented in an east–west direction and faces west. The architectural features are of Indo-Persian style with cyclopean walls built with dressed stone and plastered with lime mortar. There are two temples within the fort precincts, one is the Ram Harihar temple of the 10th century and the other one is the Kal Bhairav temple of 12th century vintage.

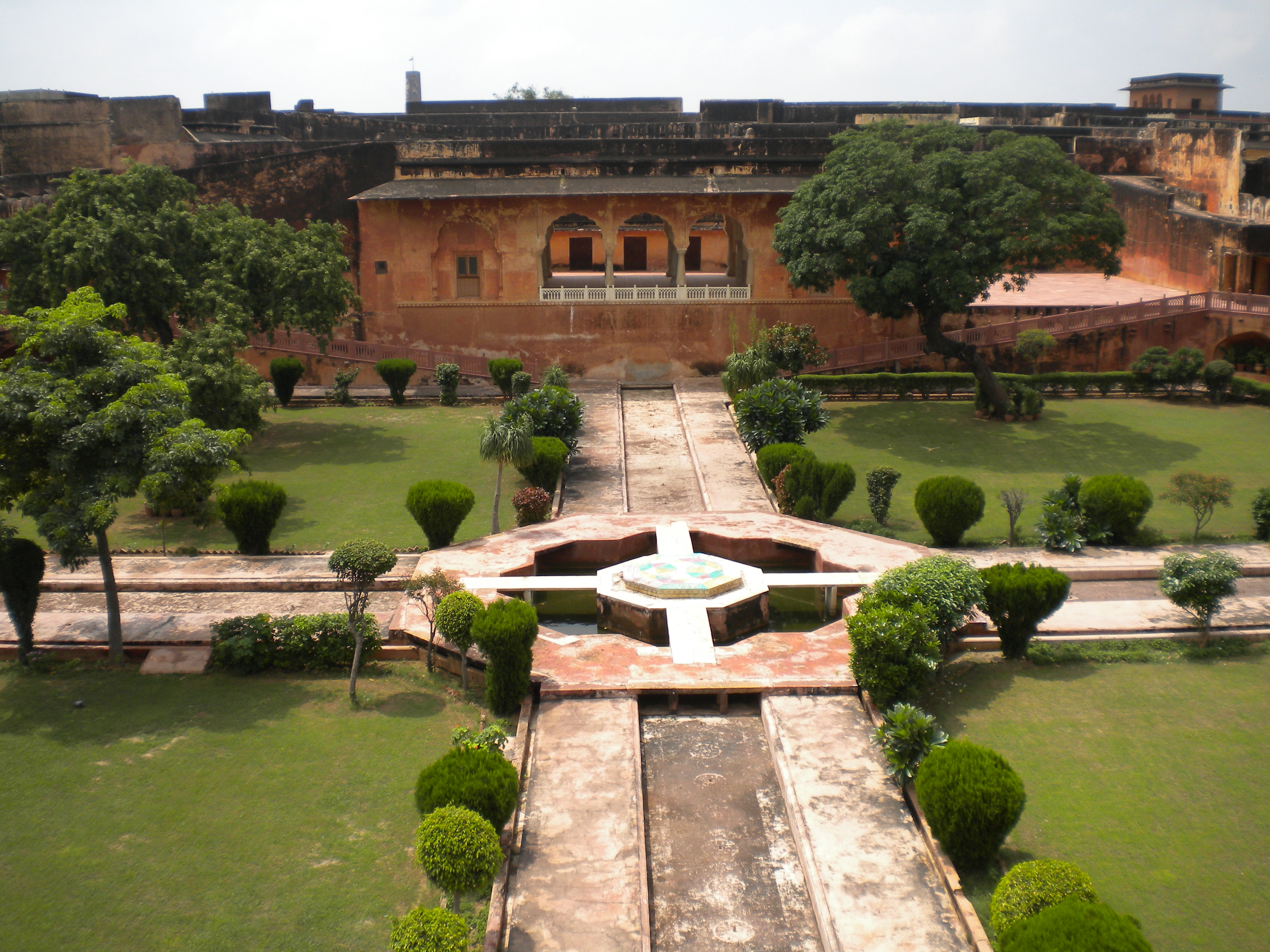
Charbagh garden at Jaigarh Fort

The water supply facilities in the fort was met by creating water harvesting structures in the vicinity in the Aravalli catchment and conveying water through a canal on the west side of the fort over a 4 kilometres (2.5 mi) distance (seen at site) to be stored in three underground tanks below the central courtyard. The largest tank had a capacity of 6 million gallons of water. There were completely false rumors, that a treasure belonging to the Kachwaha rulers of Amer had been stacked in the fort precincts (including the water tanks), that led to a totally unsuccessful search. The search had been ordered during the Emergency declared by the Indian Prime Minister Indira Gandhi during 1975–1977. A futile search was also launched, in 1977, of all the buildings in the fort, by the Income Tax department, using metal detectors. There was also a Parliament Question on this issue where a question was posed whether a "Search for treasure carried out from 10 June 1976 till November 1976 by the Income Tax Authorities at Jaigarh Fort on the Jaipur Delhi Road was closed to ordinary traffic for one or two days so as to make way for military trucks carrying treasures to the residence of the then Prime Minister, Smt. Indira Gandhi?". However, the search carried out for treasures by an Army unit at Jaigarh Fort, after a three-month search had found no treasures. It was then conjectured that Sawai Jai Singh probably used the treasure to build the city of Jaipur.

Armoury

The armoury chamber here has a wide display of swords, shields, guns, muskets and also a 50 kilograms (110 lb) cannonball. Pictures on display are old photographs of Jaipur's Maharajas namely, Sawai Bhawani Singh and Major General Man Singh II who served in the Indian Army as senior officers.

Museum

The museum is located to the left of the Awami Gate; it has exhibits of photographs of the Royalty of Jaipur, stamps and many artefacts, which include a circular pack of cards. A spittoon of 15th century vintage and also hand drawn plan of the palaces are seen in the museum.

=== Jaivana cannon ===
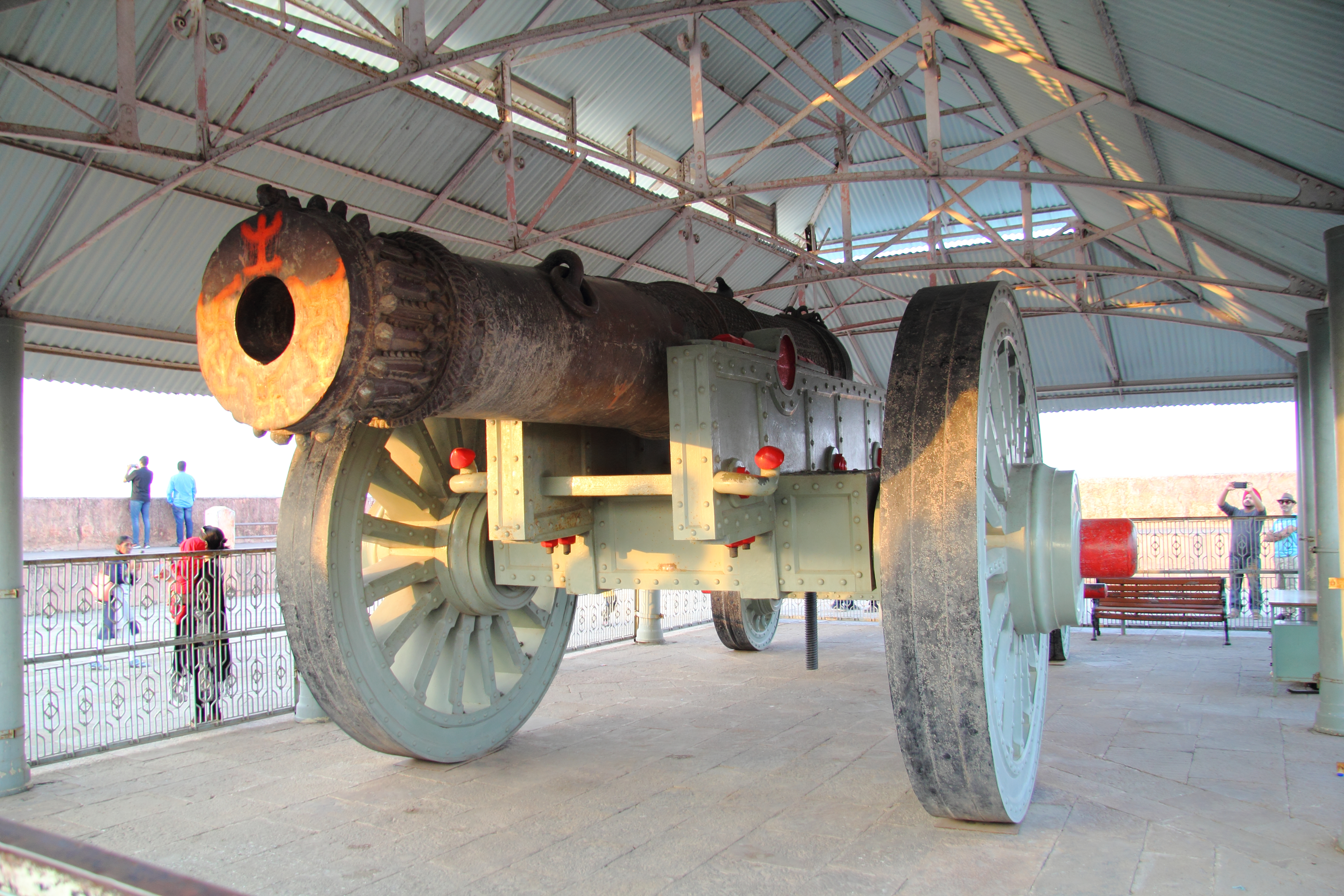
The Jaivana cannon

Jaigarh Fort was a centre of artillery production for the Rajputs. It is now home to the Jaivana – at the time of its manufacture in 1720, it was the world's largest cannon on wheels of the Early Modern Era. The foundry where it was manufactured is also located here. A plaque at the entrance to the enclosure where the Jaivan Cannon is displayed gives relevant information on the history of the Cannon, its size and use. This cannon was never used in any battle as the Rajput rulers of Amer had friendly relations with the Mughals. This testifies to well-preserved features of fort. The cannon was fired only once with a charge of 100 kilograms (220 lb) of gunpowder and when fired covered a distance of about 35 kilometres (22 mi).

The Jaivana was manufactured during the reign of Maharaja Sawai Jai Singh II (1699–1743) at a foundry in Jaigarh. The barrel is 20.19 foot (6.15 m) in length and weighs 50 tonnes. It has a diameter of 11 inches (280 mm). The barrel has decorations carved on it which depict trees, an elephant scroll and a pair of birds (ducks). It is mounted on wheels and has the mechanism of two back wheels mounted on roller pin bearings, to turn it 360° and fire in any direction. A tin shed was built to protect the cannon against weather. The cannon had a range of 22 miles and used 50 kilograms (110 lb) balls.

== Ticket ==
The entry fee for Indians is ₹202 per person and the entry fee for foreigners is around ₹200 per person. Student can show their Id cards and can have some discount.

== Timings ==
The gates of Jaigarh Fort open at 09:00 hours and close at 18:30 hours throughout the week. It is not advised to stay here in the evening as Jaigarh Fort is surrounded by thick deciduous forest. Nahargarh sanctuary is a part of the forest, and therefore wild animals lurk in the dark.

== In popular culture ==
Jaigarh Fort was the Pit Stop of the 6th leg on the American reality show The Amazing Race 14.

== Gallery ==
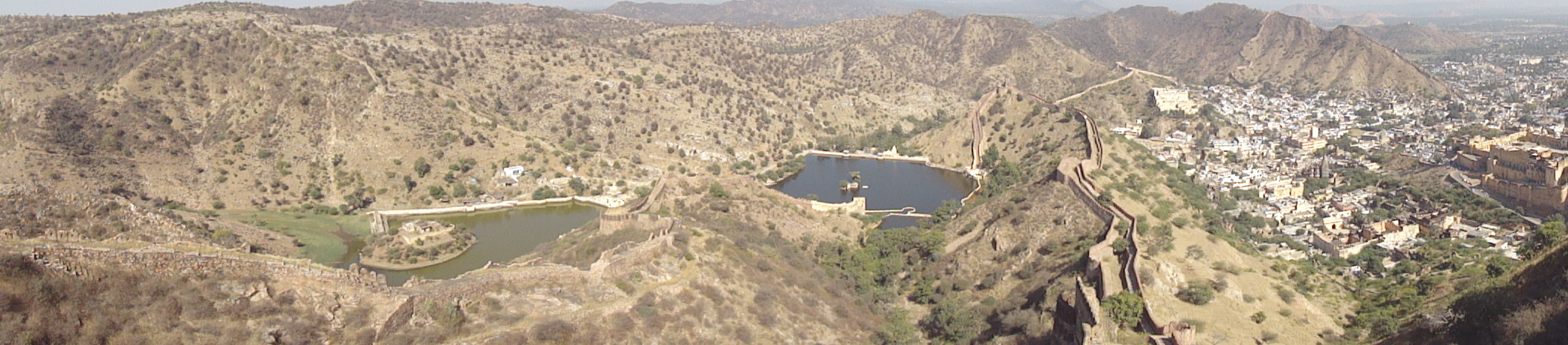
A panoramic view from Jaigarh Fort
