= Rao Kandhal =

Founder of Khandhalot Rathores, uncle of Rao Bika

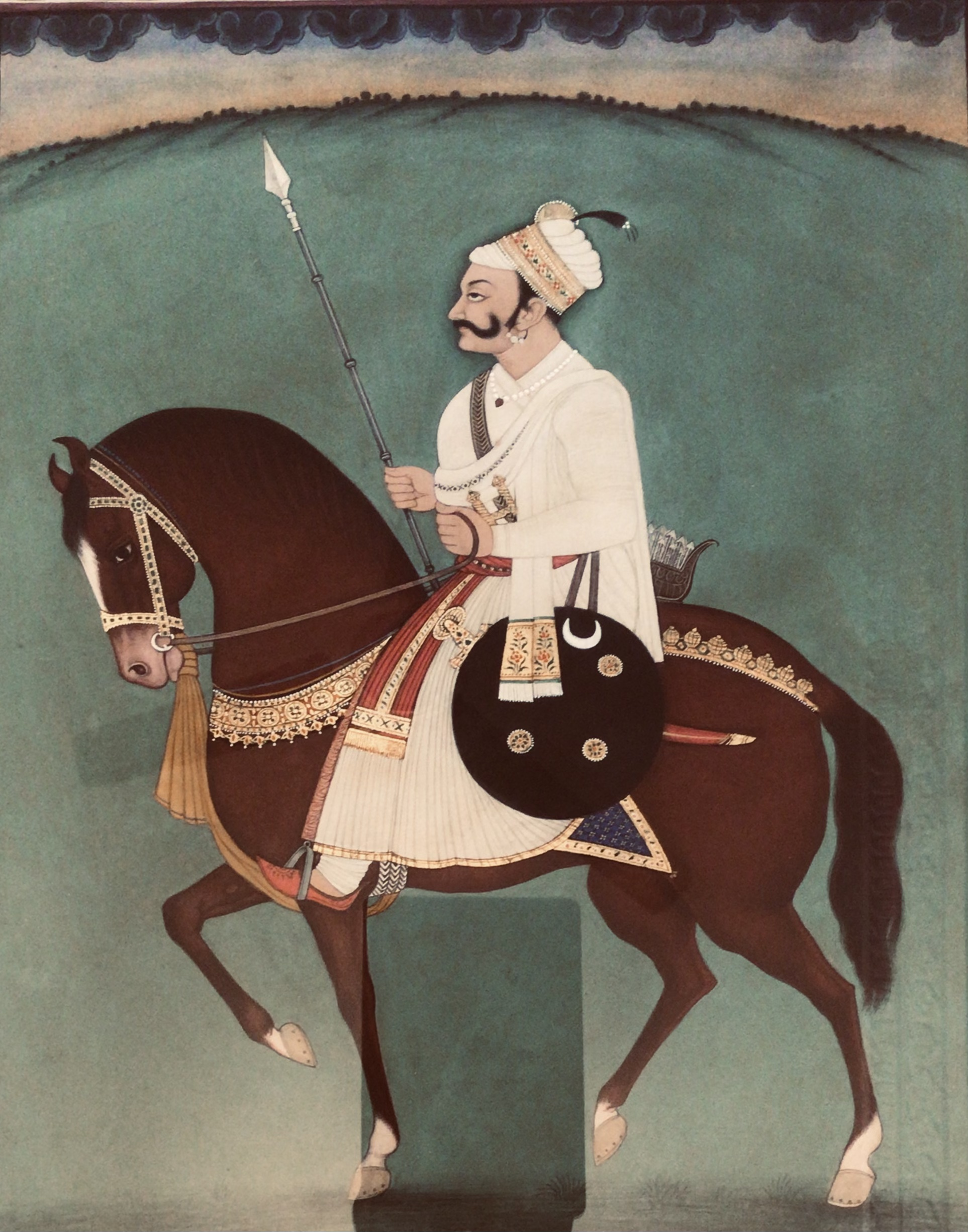
- Predecessor: Rao Ranmal
- Successor: Rawat Raj Singh
- Born: 1417
- Died: 1490 (aged 72–73)
- Religion: Hinduism

Rawat Kandhal, the third son of Marwar ruler Rao Ranmal (r. 1428–1438), was the founder of the Kandhalot clan of the Rathore dynasty in Northern India, and the co-founder of the kingdoms of Bikaner and Marwar.

From birth he was known as Rao Kandhal but was bestowed the prestigious title of Rawat (not to be confused with the caste Rawat) by his real brother, Rao Jodha, the first ruler of Marwar for rescuing their brother Rao Mandaloji from Chittorgarh all alone. He was instrumental in wresting back Marwar from Maharana Kumbha along with his brother and was responsible for establishing and territorially expanding the separate kingdom of Bikaner for his nephew Rao Bika, one of the sons of Rao Jodha and a potential heir to the throne of Marwar. Later, he established his own principality of Rajasar (in present-day Churu district). Throughout his life, the Rawat fought 52 battles. The first 9 were fought under his father Rao Ranmal, with the next 20 alongside his brother Jodha and the last 22 for Bikaner's establishment. He was killed in a battle near the present day village of Sahwa, Rajasthan in 1490 at the age of 73 while fighting the Delhi Sultanate forces led by Sarang Khan, the governor of Hisar.

== The Title of Rawat ==
After the retrieval of the Rathores (due to the assassination of Rao Ranmal) during the night from Chittorgarh where they were vassals, to Marwar where they became sovereign, one of Rao Ranmal's sons Rao Mandaloji did not wake from his sleep and was left there. When it was realised, no one dared to re-enter the mighty fortress of Chittor which was now hostile to the Rathores. But Rawat Kandhal agreed to rescue him. When he did, all were in awe and Rao Jodha, his elder brother was so impressed that he gave him the title of Rawat.

== Establishment and territorial expansion of Bikaner ==
In 1465 Rao Bika (one of the sons of Rao Jodha and a potential heir to the throne of Marwar) on the occasion in question had come late and taken seat beside his uncle Kandhal, with whom he carried a conversation in whisper. The Rao jestingly remarked that they must be scheming a plan of conquest of new territory, an idea constantly being suggested to him to provide for his large family. Rawat Kandhal took the observation as a challenge and pledged to win new lands. The land approved by Rao Jodha to conquer through conquest was Jangladesh which had been largely weakened by war as suggested by a Napo, a Sankhala Rajput. On 30 September 1465 the 27 year old Rao Bika along with Rawat Kandhal who had sworn to establish his nephew just like he did Rao Jodha in Marwar. With a considerable following of 100 horsemen and 500 foot-soldiers left Jodhpur along with his uncles Kandhal, Rupo, Mandan, Mandalo and Nathu, his brothers Bida, Jogayat and others.

They travelled to a place known as Deshnok seeking blessings from the sage Karni Mata. Bika and Kandhal sought guidance. They trained their armies without attracting attention for 3 years at Chundasar. Rao Bika then came again and impressed by his will, Karni Mata guided him and he followed. While Rao Bika was strengthening his Kingdom, Rawat Kandhal was extending the territory of Bikaner towards the North venturing into the Lodhi territory of Hisar. Along with some of his sons, numerous villages fell before him. In 1490 at Sahwa he was slain in a battle against the imperial army of the Lodhis led by the Governor of Hisar, Sarang Khan.

In 1488, Bikaner was inaugurated by Karni Mata. Although Rawat Kandhal was not alive to see that, his deeds lived on in the hearts of men and were written in ballads. As described by Colonel Powett, a British Officer, in his Gazetteer of the Bikaner state (1864)- "To the North and West the Bhatis ruled, and to the East, North East and South East were the settlements of independent Jats; beyond the Jats around Bhatner were Bhatis, Chayals and Johyas, chiefly, if not entirely Muhammadans. Hisar was occupied by the Delhi emperor's subedar. The Kaim Khanis held what is now Shekhawati. The Bidawat country was in the posetion of Mohil Rajputs, and the tract which is in the East where Reni is situated was occupied by Chayal and Khinchi Rajputs. It was due to Rawat Kandhal, along with his nephews Rao Bika and Rao Bida that all the above mentioned territories were conquered and incorporated in the Kingdom of Bikaner."

== Death and legacy ==
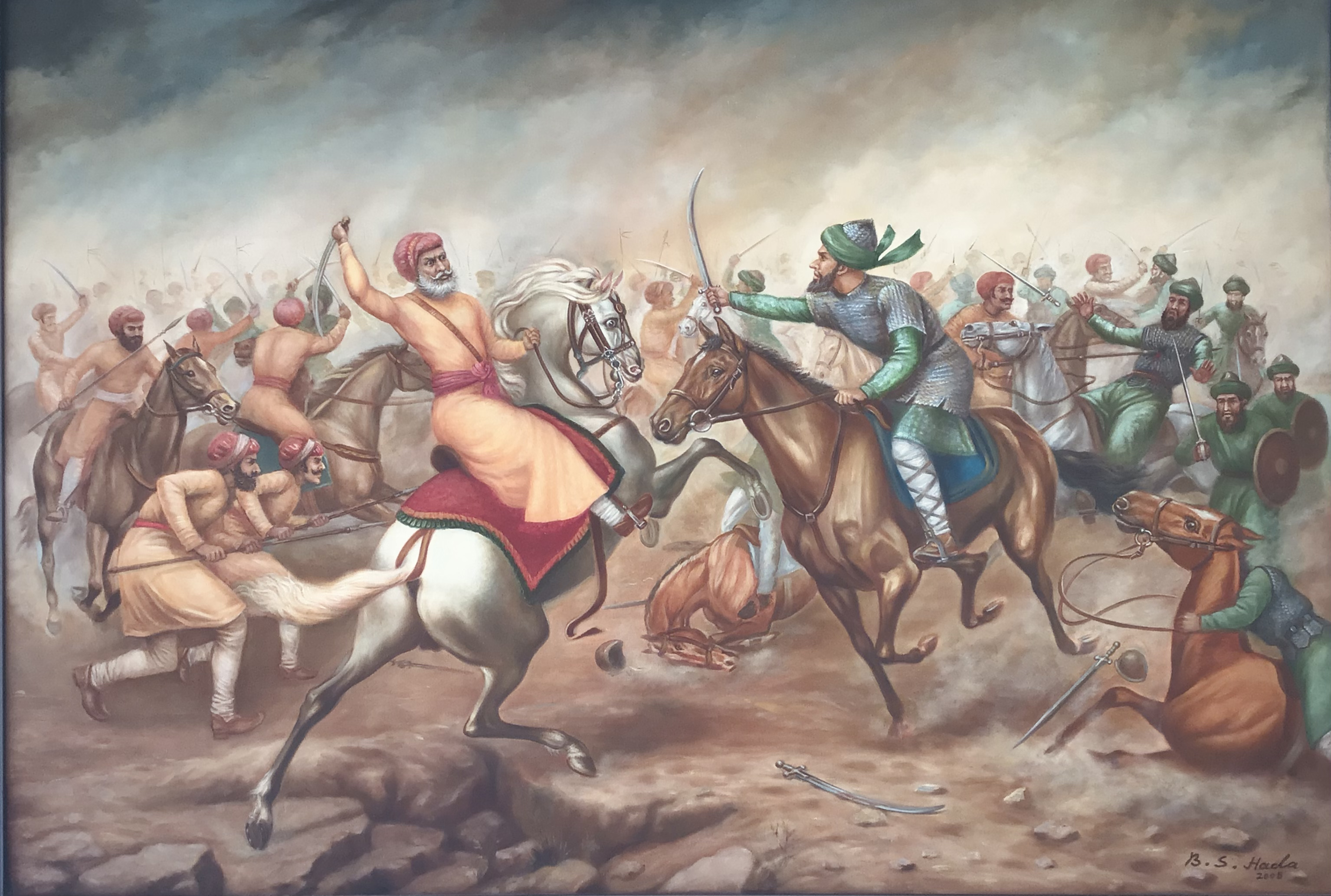
Rawat Kandhal crossing blades with Sarang Khan at Sahawa

During a Battle near the present day town of Sahwa, while leading the forces of Bikaner Rawat Kandhal faced a strong resistance by the imperial forces of Bahlol Lodi led by Sarang Khan, the governor of Hisar. During the battle his saddle somehow broke and taking advantage of that Sarang Khan encircled him. He valiantly died fighting and even crossed blades with Sarang Khan himself. It is said that 21 corpses of the enemy laid dead around him. The battle resulted in the death of the 73-year-old Rathore chief. His wife, Deevariji committed Sati at Sahawa. Various bards were written about him describing the events of his last Battle and his contributions to the kingdoms of Marwar and Bikaner.

Rao Bagha (one of his sons) at the time was along with his son Rao Banir. He convinced Rao Bika of Bikaner (Kandhalji's nephew) and Rao Jodha of Marwar (Kandhalji's older brother) to combine their forces to seek revenge. Between 1490 and 1491 Rao Bagha led his forces against Sarang Khan and exacted revenge for his father's death by defeating him at Sahawa. Rao Bagha was killed in this battle.

After his death, instead of his grandson Rao Banir who was then a minor, the titles of Rawat Kandhal went to Rao Raj Singh (of Rajasar who later on founded his own principality of Jaitpur) owing to political intrigue. Rao Banir went to Sahawa, and later shifted his seat to Shivgarh Ghanghu where he finally settled. Many thikanas emerged from his descendants later on, including CHURU, THAILASAR. Many junior thikanas also emerged including Ghantel, Khandawa, Kallasar, Lohsana, Karanpura, Jaitpur, Depalsar, Dudwa, Lakhau, Jhariya, Jhanjhani, among others.

The Kandhalot clan- the descendants of Rawat Kandhal which formed an integral part of the Bikaner state are today divided into 3 subdivisions- Rawatot (descendants of Rawat Raj Singhji), Banirot (descendants of Rao Banirji- son of Rao Bagha) and Saidasot (descendants of Rao Ardakmalji). The headseat of the Kandhalot clan was the Thikana of Rawatsar (made by the descendants of Rawat Raj Singhji).
