= History of Bikaner =

History of Indian city

The region of Bikaner, stretching across north-western state of Rajasthan in India, was earlier known as Jangladesh. It included the present-day districts of Bikaner, Churu, Ganganagar, and Hanumangarh. It is bounded on the south by Marwar and Jaisalmer regions, on the east by Ajmer-Merwara region.

Bikaner state was a princely state that was founded in the 16th century as Mughal Jagirdar in this region under Mughal empire. After becoming a British protectorate in 1818, it persisted until shortly after India's Independence in 1947.

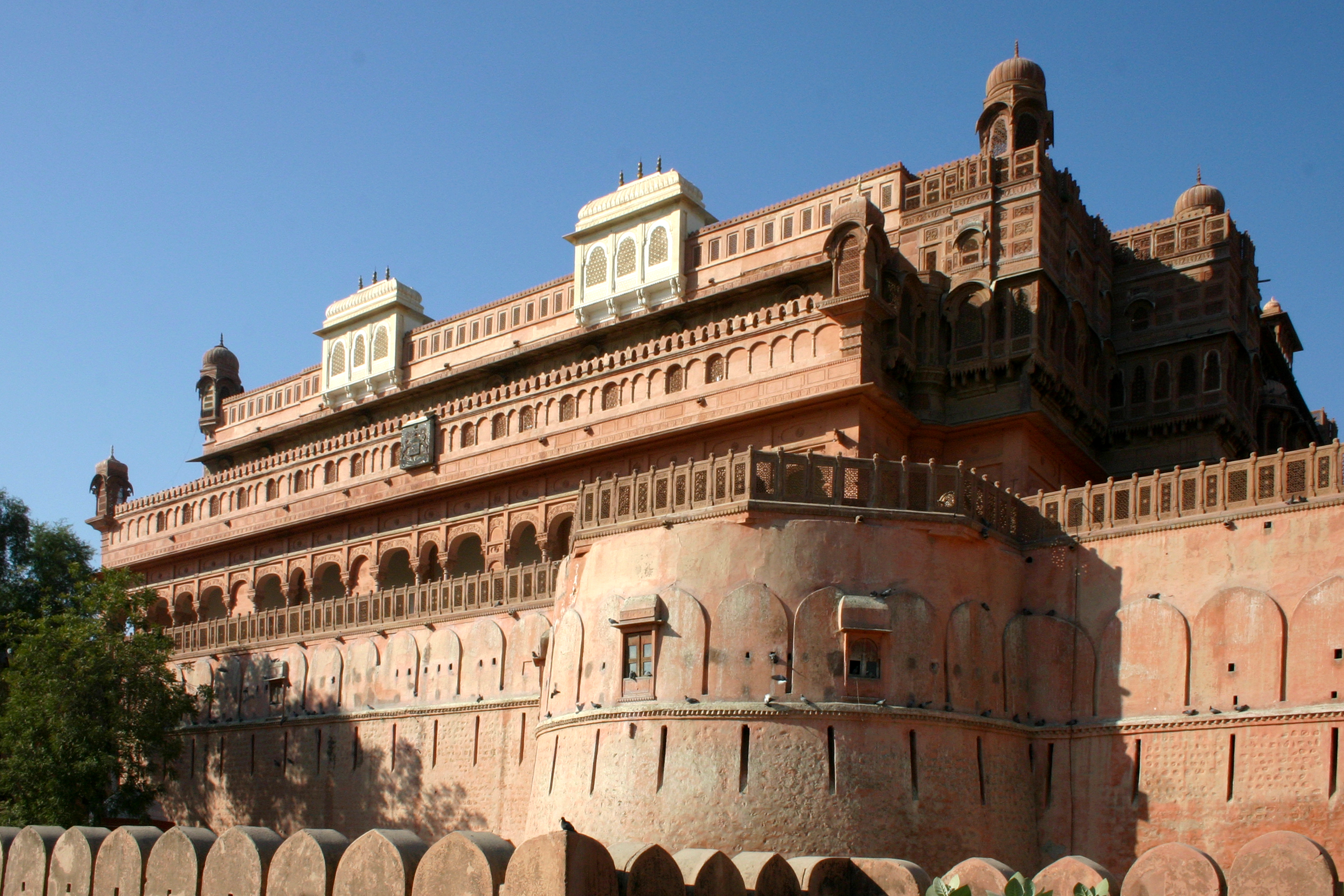
History of Bikaner
Location	North-western Rajasthan
19th-century flag
State established:	1488
Language	Rajasthani language-: Bagri in the Northern, North-western, Central and eastern region; Marwari in the Southern region bordering Marwar
Dynasties	Rathores (1488–1949)
Historical capitals	Bikaner

Prior to the mid-15th century, the region that is now Bikaner was a barren wilderness called Jangladesh. Rao Bika established the city of Bikaner in 1488. He was the son of Rao Jodha of the Rathor Rajput clan, the founder of Jodhpur and conquered the largely arid area in the north of Rajasthan. Provoked by a stray comment by his father, Bika left Marwar (Jodhpur) with his uncle Kandhmal to create his own kingdom. During his journey, Bika stopped at Deshnok where he consulted Goddess Karni Mata for her blessings and get prophesied that he would be successful. Encouraged by her support, Bika took advantage of the internal rivalries of the Jat people to carve out his own territory in the "Jangladesh" region of Rajasthan.

Though it was in the Thar Desert, Bikaner was considered an oasis on the trade route between Central Asia and the Gujarat coast as it had adequate spring water. Bika's name was attached to the city he built and to the state of Bikaner ("the settlement of Bika") that he established. Bika built a fort in 1478, which is now in ruins, and a hundred years later a new fort was built about 1.5 km from the city centre, known as the Junagarh Fort.

Around a century after Rao Bika founded Bikaner, the state's fortunes flourished under the sixth Raja, Rai Singhji, who ruled from 1571 to 1611. During the Mughal Empire's rule in the country, Raja Rai Singh accepted the suzerainty of the Mughals and held a high rank as an army general at the court of the Emperor Akbar and his son the Emperor Jahangir. Rai Singh's successful military exploits, which involved winning half of Mewar kingdom for the Empire, won him accolades and rewards from the Mughal emperors. He was given the jagirs (lands) of Gujarat and Burhanpur. With the large revenue earned from these jagirs, he built the Chintamani Durg (Junagarh fort) on a plain which has an average elevation of 760 feet (230 m). He was an expert in arts and architecture, and the knowledge he acquired during his visits abroad is amply reflected in the numerous monuments he built at the Junagarh fort.

Maharaja Karan Singh, who ruled from 1631 to 1669, under the suzerainty of the Mughals, built the Karan Mahal palace. Later rulers added more floors and decorations to this Mahal. Anup Singh, who ruled from 1669 to 1698, made substantial additions to the fort complex, with new palaces and the Zenana quarter, a royal dwelling for women and children. He refurbished the Karan Mahal with a Diwan-i-Am (public audience hall) and called it the Anup Mahal. Maharaja Gaj Singh, who ruled from 1746 to 1787 refurbished the Chandra Mahal (the Moon palace).

During the 18th century, there was an internecine war between the rulers of Bikaner and Jodhpur and also amongst other thakurs, which was put down by British troops in the 19th century.

Following Maharaja Gaj Singh, Maharaja Surat Singh ruled from 1787 to 1828 and lavishly decorated the audience hall (see illustration) with glass and lively paintwork. Under a treaty of paramountcy signed in 1818, during Maharaja Surat Singh's reign, Bikaner came under the suzerainty of the British, after which the Maharajas of Bikaner invested heavily in refurbishing Junagarh fort.

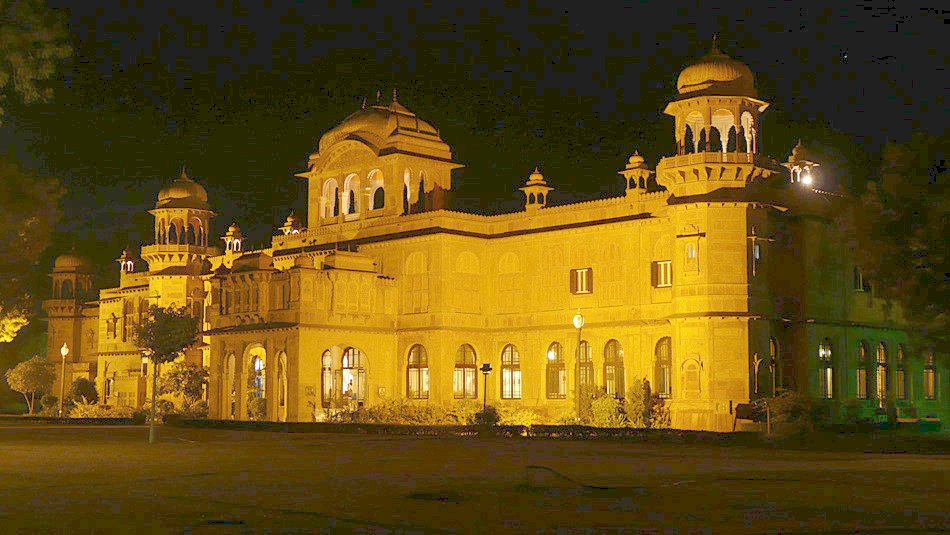
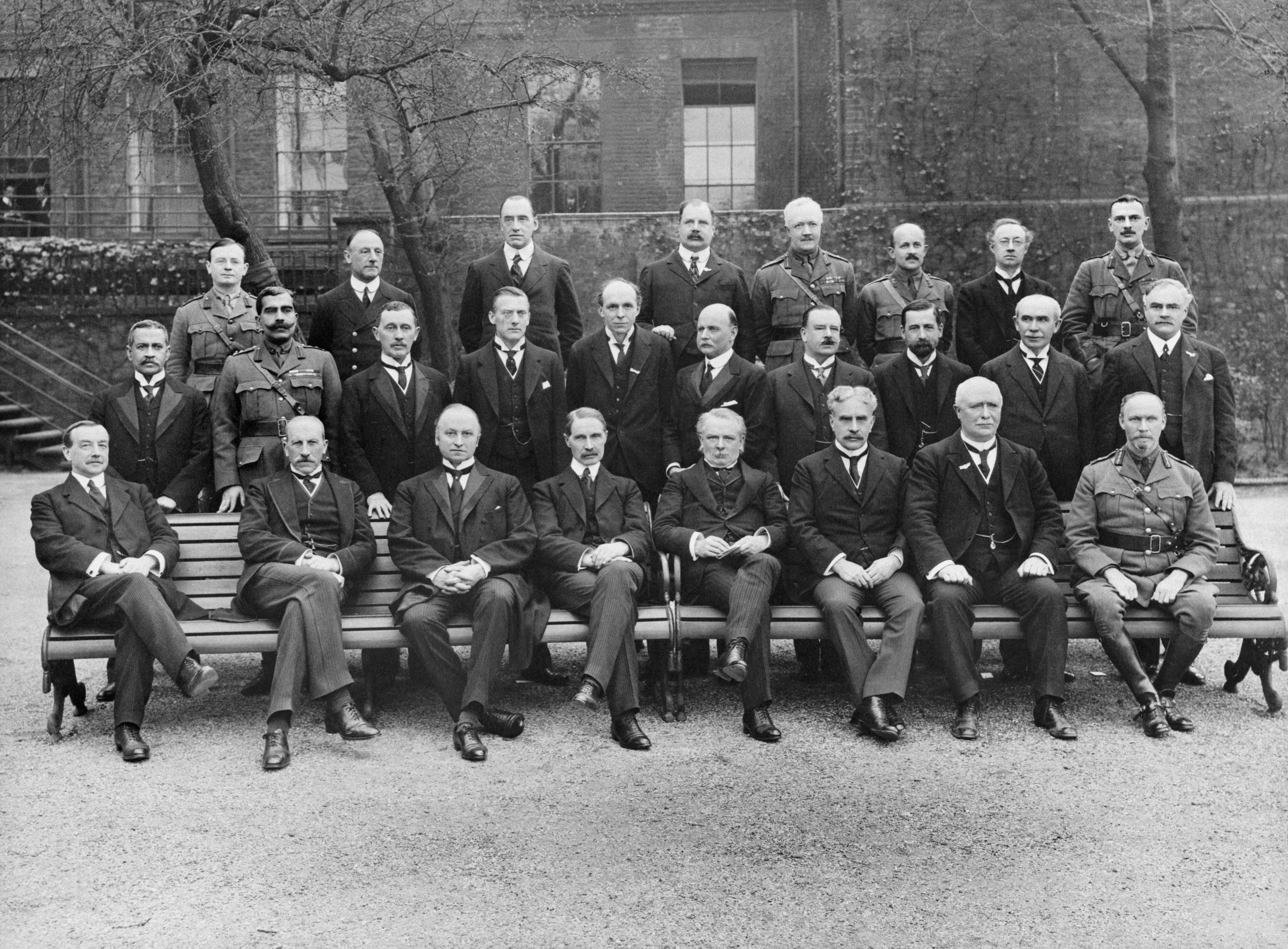
Left: Lalgarh Palace, built (Indo-Saracenic style) for Maharaja Ganga Singh and named after his father, presently a heritage hotel and also a residence of the Bikaner Royal Family. Right: Ganga Singh as a member of the Imperial War Cabinet at No. 10 Downing Street, 1917.

Dungar Singh, who reigned from 1872 to 1887, built the Badal Mahal, the 'weather palace', so named in view of a painting of clouds and falling rain, a rare event in arid Bikaner.

General Maharaja Ganga Singh, who ruled from 1887 to 1943, was the best-known of the Rajasthan princes and was a favourite of the British Viceroys of India. He was appointed a Knight Commander of the Order of the Star of India, served as a member of the Imperial War Cabinet, represented India at the Imperial Conferences during the First World War and the British Empire at the Versailles Peace Conference. His contribution to the building activity in Junagarh involved separate halls for public and private audiences in the Ganga Mahal and a durbar hall for formal functions. He also built the Ganga Niwas Palace, which has towers at the entrance patio. This palace was designed by Sir Samuel Swinton Jacob, the third of the new palaces built in Bikaner. He named the building Lalgarh Palace in honour of his father and moved his main residence there from Junagarh Fort in 1902. The hall where he held his Golden Jubilee (in 1938) as Bikaner's ruler is now a museum.

Ganga Singh's son, Lieutenant-General Sir Sadul Singh, the Yuvaraja of Bikaner, succeeded his father as Maharaja in 1943, but acceded his state to the Union of India in 1949. Maharaja Sadul Singh died in 1950, being succeeded in the title by his son, Karni Singh (1924-1988). The Royal Family still lives in a suite in Lalgarh Palace, which they have converted into a heritage hotel.

== The rise of Rao Bika ==
About 1465 Rao Bika, a Rathore Rajput, and an elder son of Rao Jodha, king of Marwar, provoked by a stray comment by his father, left Marwar (Jodhpur) with a small contingent of Rathore and Rajpurohit warriors (500 soldier and 100 cavalrymen) to create his own kingdom. He was accompanied by his uncle, Rawat Kandhal, his brother Rao Bida and his chief advisor Vikramji Rajpurohit, who provided politico-strategic advice.

Encouraged by the mystic Karni Mata, whom he had met early in his travels, he took advantage of the internal rivalries of the Jat clans so that by 1485 he was able to establish his own territory and build a small fort called Rati Ghati at the city which still bears his name. In 1488 he began the building of the city itself. In the beginning, the neighboring Bhati chiefs were suspicious of the new growing power in their vicinity. Karni Mata, who had become the kuladevi of Rao Bika brought the rivalry between the Rathore & Bhatis to an end by inspiring Rao Shekha – the powerful Bhati chief of Pugal, to give the hand of his daughter in marriage to Rao Bika. This consolidated Rao Bika's power in the region and proved to be a milestone in the history of the state.

Upon Rao Jodha's death in 1488 Rao Bika stormed Mehrangarh Fort, an event that was to lead to 200 years of intermittent wars between Marwar and Bikaner.

Remains of the original small fortress Rao Bika built can still be seen around the walled city, near Lakshminath ji temple. The royal family of Bikaner lived there, till Raja Rai Singh Ji built a new fort called "Chintamani" (now Junagarh) between 1589 and 1594 AD.

According to legend Bika Lunkaran consulted a holy man called Jas Nathji, who foretold that Bika's line would reign for 450 years. While Bika was pleased with this prediction, his brother Gharsiji when he heard of the prediction thought a longer period of power should have been prophesied. He confronted the holy man while he was in a deep trance and roused him by thrusting burning incense under his nose. Jas Nathji told him 'All right take 50 years more or less but of trial and tribulation'.

Rao Bika died in 1504. His successors benefited from the weak rule of Suraj Mal of Marwar and the disruption caused by Babur's invasion of India to consolidate and extend their possessions until by the 17th century all the Jat clans (including the powerful Godara clan) had accepted the suzerainty of the rulers of Bikaner.

One of the most successful earlier rulers was Jaitasi Singh (1526–41) until he was killed by the forces of Rao Maldev of Marwar. He was succeeded by his son Kalyan Mal (1541–74) who under pressure from the Marwar forces retreated to the Punjab where he joined with Sher Shah Suri who expelled the Mughal ruler Humayun in 1540. With Sher Shah Suri's support, Kalyan Mal was able by 1545 to recover his lost territories from Rao Maldev, causing death of Kishandas Ji Rajpurohit in action, whose son has been provided with jagiri of Kishnasar in Nokha Tehsil in Bikaner, which has given rise to Kanot Rajpurohit clan as a major warlords in upcoming battles, and winning 12 villages as a gift jagiri from the state including Hiyadesar, Desalsar, Rasisar, Dheerdesar, Aadsar, Kalyanpura, Sawai bari, Kotri, Hirajsar, Saajansar, Deha, Kuntalsar.

== Mughal era ==
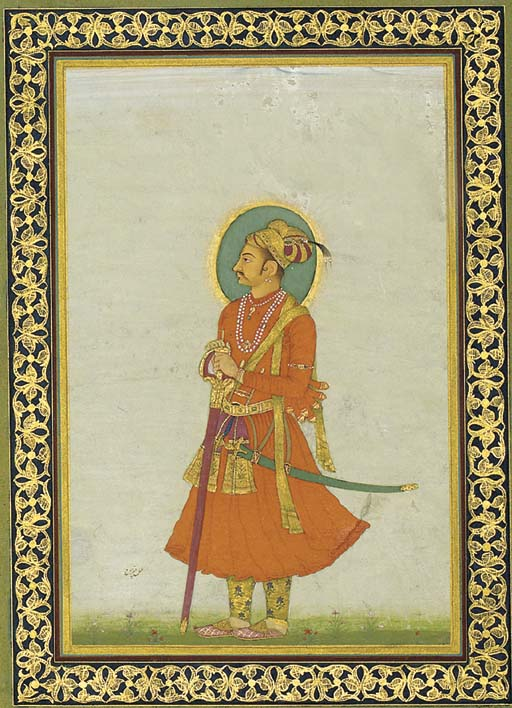
Raja Karan Singh of Bikaner, Auranzeb's ally and enemy

The return of Humayun to power meant that Bikaner due to its involvement with Sher Shah Suri came into conflict with the Mughals again. However Kalyan Mal by using all the advantages of the harsh desert environment around Bikaner was able to defeat any invading Mughal army. The coming of Akbar to power saw the Mughal empire turn to diplomacy instead of force to bring the individual Rajput states into the empire. As a result, Raja Rai Singh, the sixth ruler of Bikaner was among the first Rajput Chiefs to make an alliance with the Mughal Empire. As a result, during the reign of the Mughal emperor Akbar the rulers of Bikaner were esteemed among the most loyal adherents of the empire and held high ranks as Mansabdars of special order in the imperial court. They served as military commanders in various Mughal campaigns all over the Indiasub-continent.

== Early and middle 19th century ==
By the middle of the 19th century, the years of internal strife together with the financial and military demands put on Bikaner by the British had put the kingdom in debt. A sharp turnaround in the fortunes of the kingdom occurred in 1842 when Maharaja Ratan Singh took advantage of a shortage of pack animals to supply Bikaner's renowned camels at considerable profit to the British for their Afghan expedition. The turnaround was such that by 1844 he was able to reduce the dues on goods passing through Bikaner. He also gave assistance in both Sikh campaigns to the British.

== Ganga Singh ==
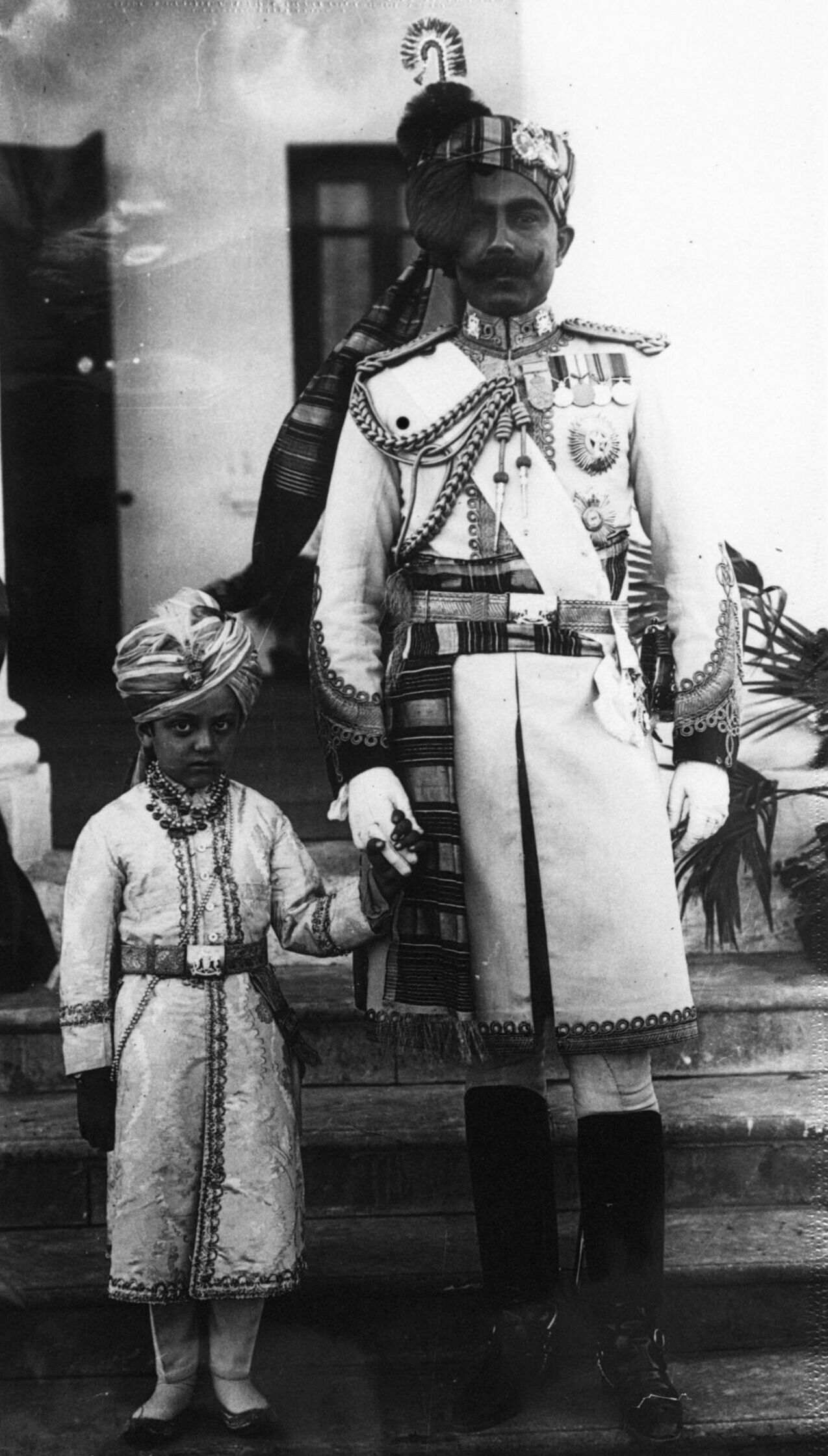
Ganga Singh with his son in 1914

The reign of Maharaja Ganga Singh was notable for great socio-political and economic development in every sphere of life, namely, education, health, sanitation, water supply, power generation and electricity, irrigation, post and telegraph, roads and railways, trade and commerce, etc.

Drought is a common occurrence, and the region faced the most severe famine in 1899–1900 which was so severely felt that by 1901 it reduced the population to 584,627, a decrease of 30%.

When Maharaja Ganga Singh died in 1943, he was succeeded by Maharaja Sadul Singh. he was the colonel of the Regiment of 2nd lancers.

== Accession to India ==
With the departure of the British in 1947, the subsidiary alliance of 1818 came to an end and Bikaner was left as an independent state, with the choice falling to Maharaja Sadul Singh of acceding to one of the new dominions, India or Pakistan. In the event, Sadul Singh was one of the first rulers of a princely state to sign an Instrument of Accession, on 7 August 1947, choosing India. Bikaner became part of the state of Rajputana, which was later renamed Rajasthan.

== House of Rathore at Bikaner ==
Name		Reign Began	Reign Ended
1	Rao Bika	1472	1504
2	Rao Narayan Singh	1504	1505
3	Rao Luna Karana Lon-Karan	1505	1526
4	Rao Jait Singh Jetasi	1526	1541
5	Rao Kalyan Mal – Acknowledged the suzerainty of Emperor Akbar at Nagaur in November 1570	1541	1574
6	Rao Rai Singh Rai Rai Singh – Important General in the Mughal army Similar to Raja Man Singh I of Amber.	1574	1612
7	Rai Dalpat Singh Dalip	1612	1613
8	Rai Surat Singh Bhuratiya	1613	1631
9	Rao Karan Singh Jangalpat Badhshah – Deposed by Emperor Aurangzeb for dereliction of duty at Attock, 11 January 1667. Exiled to his betel gardens at Karanpura, in the Deccan	1631	1667
10	Maharaja Rao Anup Singh – To be the first to be granted the title 'Maharaja' by Emperor Aurangzeb. Served in the Deccan campaign at Salher in 1672, Bijapur in 1675, and the siege of Golconda in 1687. He was administrator of Aurangabad 1677–1678, Hakim of Adoni, 1678, Imtiazgarh, Adoni 1689–1693, and of Nusratabad, Sukkar 1693–1698.	1669	1698
11	Maharaja Rao Sarup Singh – He died from smallpox, at Adoni, in the Deccan, 15 December 1700.	1698	1700
12	Maharaja Rao Sujan Singh – Ordered to attend Emperor Aurangzeb in the Deccan, where he remained for ten years. Faced invasions from Maharaja Abhai Singh of Jodhpur and Maharaja Bakht Singh of Nagaur, but successfully repulsed both.	1700	1735
13	Maharaja Rao Zorawar Singh	1735	1746
14	Maharaja Rao Gaj Singh – the first of his line granted permission to mint his own coinage by Emperor Alamgir II	1746	1787
15	Maharaja Rao Rai Singh II Raj Singh	1787	1787
16	Maharaja Rao Pratap Singh – Reigned under the Regency of his uncle Surat Singh who poisoned him to assume the throne	1787	1787
17	Maharaja Rao Surat Singh – He incurred huge debts due to his military adventures which had reduced his state to near anarchy. Entered the protection of the East India Company with a subsidiary alliance on 9 March 1818.	1787	1828
18	Narendra Maharaja Rao Ratan Singh – received the hereditary title of Narendra Maharaja from Emperor Akbar Shah II and assisted the British by furnishing them with supplies during the First Afghan War of 1841.	1828	1851
19	Narendra Maharaja Rao Sardar Singh – Assisted the British during the Indian Uprising of 1857 and served in person during many of the battles. Removed the name of the Mughal Emperor from his coinage, replacing the words with "Aurang Arya Hind wa Queen Victoria".	1851	1872
20	Narendra Maharaja Rao Dungar Singh – Assisted the British during the Second Afghan War.	1872	1887
21	General Narendra Maharaja Sir Rao Ganga Singh – served in the First World War in France and Flanders 1914–1915. Member of the Imperial War Cabinet and served the British Royal Family in many other official capacities. Signed the Treaty of Versailles on behalf of India on 28 June 1919. Indian representative at the Imperial Conferences and at the League of Nations.	1887	1943
22	Lieutenant-General Narendra Maharaja Sir Rao Sadul Singh – Signed the instrument of accession to the Dominion of India on 7 August 1947. Merged his state into the present state of Rajasthan, India on 30 March 1949.	1943	1950
23	Rao Karni Singh – Member of Parliament (Lok Sabha) for Bikaner, 1952–1977. On 28 December 1971, India amended its Constitution to remove the position of the rulers of princely states and their right to receive privy-purse payments, thus making him the last ruler of Bikaner.	1950	1971

== Head of House of Rathore clan in Bikaner ==
Name		Assumed Headship of family	Died
1	Maharaja Karni Singh	1971	1988
2	Maharaja Narendra Singh	1988	2003
3	Maharaja Ravi Raj Singh	2003	2022
