= Karni Mata =

Hindu goddess of power and victory

- Goddess of Power and Victory, and Incarnation of Hinglaj as per local sources
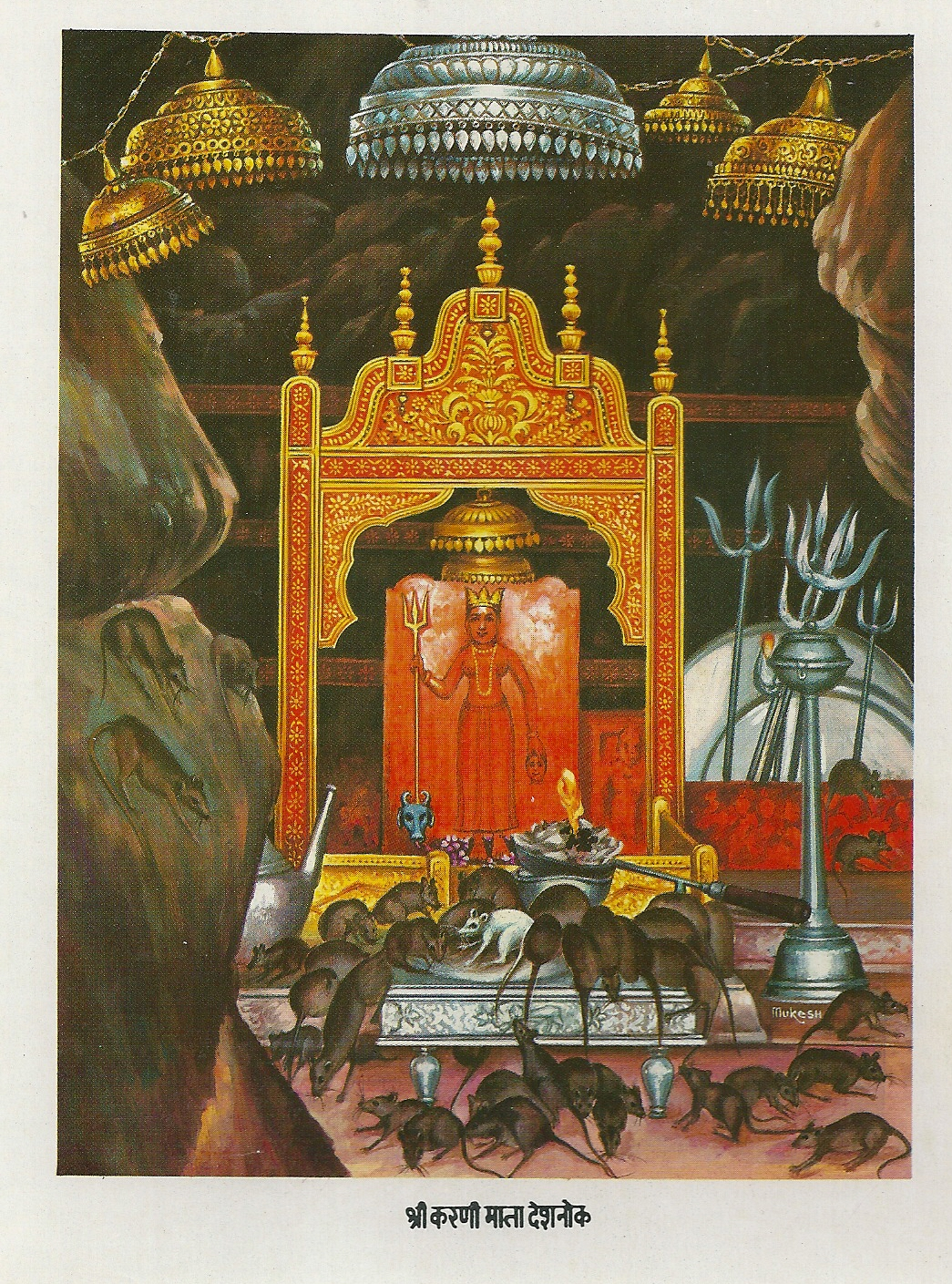
- Other names: Riddhi Baisa
- Devanagari: करणी माता
- Affiliation: Charans; Rajputs
- Abode: Western Rajasthan (Marwar)
- Weapon: Trident
- Symbol: Eagle (Sanwali)
- Mount: Lion flanked by eagle

Genealogy
- Parents: Mehaji Kiniya & Deval Bai
- Spouse: Depaji Rohadiya of Sathika

Karni Mata (Hindi: करणी माता, or Bhagwati Karniji Maharaj), known by various names such as Bhagwati, Mehaai, Jagdamba, and Kiniyani is a Hindu Goddess of power and victory described as a warrior sage, who lived between the 14th and 16th centuries in Western Rajasthan. Karni Mata is the tutelary deity of the Rajputs and Charans of northwestern India. As a Sagati, she is also worshipped as an incarnation of Hinglaj or Durga. She is the official deity of the royal families of Bikaner and Jodhpur. Karniji played an important role in shaping the history of the region. She is intimately associated with the establishment of the Rajput hegemony in the region. With her blessings, Rao Jodha and Rao Bika founded the kingdoms of Jodhpur and Bikaner. At the request of the Maharajas of Bikaner and Jodhpur, she laid the foundations of Bikaner Fort and Mehrangarh Fort, the two most important forts in the region. She lived an ascetic life and was widely revered during her lifetime. Indian Army troops from the Marwar region also regard Karni Mata as their patron deity.

The most famous of the Karni Mata temples is the Karni Mata Temple of Deshnoke where the temple and surrounding Oran land are a sacred sanctuary for all the living beings and no one is to be harmed. In Rajasthan, Blackbucks are considered sacred as Karni Mata is supposed to protect them.

== Significance ==
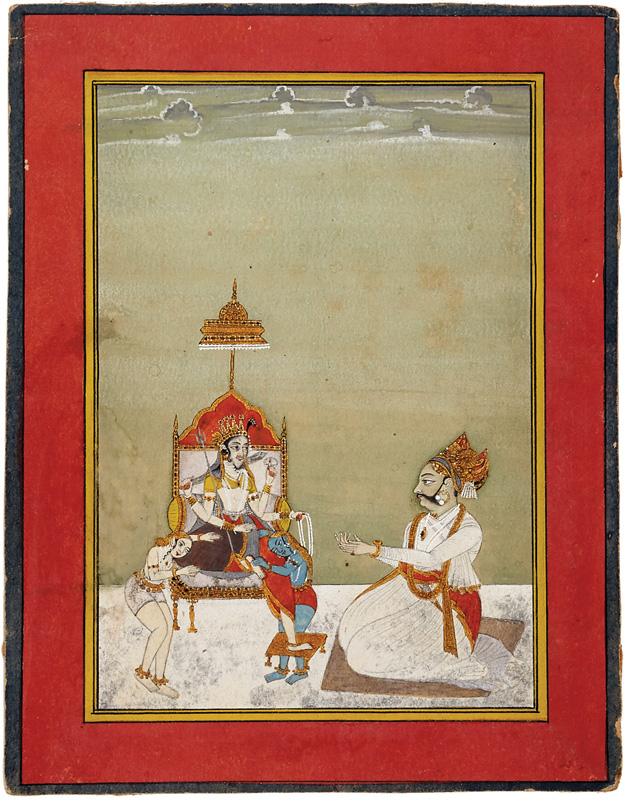
Maharaja Gaj Singh of Bikaner worshiping goddess Karni Mata, 1723 CE

The spiritual importance of the symbol of the Karni Mata is that of non violence, protector, peaceful coexistence and provider of the power & legitimacy to the Rajputs. One of the most revered deities of Rajputs is Karni Mata, whom many Rajput clans worship as family goddess and link their community's existence or survival in dire times. Karni Mata is also attributed with having a close relationship with the Rathore rulers, not only of Bikaner but also of Jodhpur. Throughout the history of both states, there are numerous accounts of the deity interceding on behalf of a ruler during times of battle, or in matters of alliance building. As Karni Singh, the last titular Maharaja of Bikaner, noted:

"Karniji has always been important for the house of Bikaner. My father was a great devotee of the Goddess, as was his father before him. She has protected every member of this lineage. My wife and I worship her in her temple each day and she continues to watch over us all ... ... the first act of Bika upon entering the territory of the Jangli Desh, was to come to touch the feet of the most revered incarnate deity, Karni Mata ...'"

In present times, the Karni Mata temple in Deshnoke has become an important gathering spot for many Charan clans. Her devotees often mention that after the 1947 Partition of India and the subsequent problems in reaching Hinglaj, Karni Mata temple of Deshnoke has become the most important site for the community.

== Cāraṇa Sagat ==
Karni Mata worshipped Awad Mata who was an earlier incarnation of Hinglaj in 8-9th century. When Charans chart the genealogy of incarnate deities, they usually begin with Hinglaj Mata and continue the list with the names of Awad Mata and then Karni Mata. Each successive figure is believed to be an incarnation or avatar of the previous sagat. However, not all incarnate deities follow this genealogy and not all are considered to be forms of, or linked to, any previously known sagat.

== History ==
=== Polity of contemporary Rajasthan ===
The conditions of the region (present day Rajasthan) were unstable, with frequent internecine warfare between rival Hindu chiefs, mostly Rajputs, holding sway over small principalities. Muslim rulers who had conquered Delhi were expanding their territory throughout North India, with Sikander Lodi gaining control of Nagaur in Rajasthan. The arrival of the Rathores, evicted from their seat of power in Kannauj, in Marwar led to tensions with the Bhatis, rulers of the Jaisalmer kingdom, who held small principalities like Pugal in Northern Rajasthan and Southern Punjab. Bhagwati Karniji utilised her influence over her devotees by uniting the Rathores and the Bhatis by marriage and eliminating scope for strife.

The northern region of Rajasthan, which would later form the kingdom of Bikaner, was divided into small principalities ruled by various Rajput, Muslim, and Jat clans. Rajput clans such as Sankhla, Mohil, and Bhati held significant principalities, while Jat tribes, including the Godara of Ladhdiya and Shekhsar, the Saran of Bhadang, and the Kasava of Sidhmukh, divided the northeast portion of the region. Bhati Muslims known as Ranghad ruled Hissar, and Johiya Muslims controlled most of the present-day Ganganagar district.

These principalities were not sovereign powers and often shifted allegiances, leading to frequent internecine warfare among them. This contributed to the chaos and insecurity prevalent during this time, as these small principalities often indulged in short-lived alliances and battles or organized plundering expeditions in neighboring areas.

Despite various Muslim powers having conquered most of Northern India, Rajasthan remained a region where defeated dynasties from the rest of India had regrouped and were competing for regional hegemony. It was during this period that Karniji recognized the need and opportunity to unite the Hindu polity under one banner, and found in the Rathores a means of achieving this objective.

The prevalent insecurity and chaos of this time period put the social and economic life of common people in jeopardy. Karniji foresaw the need for a strong and united kingdom for the Rathores out of the scattered principalities of the Jangal Pradesh and lands to the north and east of it. She directed Rao Bika and his associates to work towards this objective, predicting even greater glory and a larger domain for Bika than his illustrious father, Rao Jodha, had won.

== Early life ==
Karniji, named Ridhi Kanwar at birth, was born at the Suwap village on Asoj Shukla 7th of Vikram Samvat 1444 (1387 AD). Her father, Mehaji Kiniya, was the lord of the village and belonged to Kiniya clan of Charanas.

The founder of the Kiniya clan lived at Khod in the Kathiawar region of Gujarat. In the 13th century, Bhimal, 4th generation descendant of the founder, left home and migrated to Janglu region in Northern Rajasthan. He received a grant of land from Rai Sankhla, the ruler of Janglu, where he founded a village named Kiniya-ki-Basti and lived there. Mehaji Kiniya was born four generations later in the lineage of Bhimal. He was a contemporary of Meha Mangaliya, the ruler of a surrounding region in Jodhpur, from whom Mehaji Kiniya received a grant of a village called "Suwa-Brahman-Ki-Dhani", later renamed to Suwap.

Karniji's mother was Deval Bai of Arha (or Adha) clan. Deval Bai was the granddaughter of Arha Mandha, the ruler of Adha (or Asada) village, situated on the border of Jodhpur and Jaisalmer. The birth of Karniji was the long-awaited culmination of the prayers and piety of Mehaji Kiniya, the father of Bhagwati Karniji, and a great devotee of Hinglaj. He had, in quest of the boon, undertaken the long and arduous journey to Hinglaj in Las Bela of present-day Balochistan province of Pakistan. While Karniji's father was undertaking the pilgrimage to Hinglaj, the Goddess Hinglaj appeared to her mother and foretold the coming of the Devi.

Karniji was born as the successive sixth girl child. It is said that her mother had an abnormally long gestation period which lasted for 21 months, and the girl was named Ridhi Kanwar.

=== First miracle ===
During the customary Surya Pujan, performed seven days after the birth, relatives and friends had gathered hoping for a son. Among them was Meha's sister, who eagerly entered the purified maternity chamber to bless the child and claim long-expected gifts. However, the child was a girl, which was disapproved of by Meha's sister. In the moment when the aunt tried to strike-more perhaps in anger than play-the newborn with the back of her hand, her fingers became impaired immediately. This light punishment for unjust physical violence to the Infant was the avatar's first miracle. As taking the clue from Mehaji's remark that the child could do things and was in other words Karni, she came to be called Karni. Thus, the occasion of the birth of a miraculous child was celebrated with rejoicing by all.

=== Suwa Brahman obtains a Boon ===
Suwap village, now belonging to the Kiniya Charanas as their jagir, was named after a Brahmin named Suwa who settled there and made a fortune as a moneylender to local jagirdars. Despite being prosperous and married thrice, Suwa was mocked for being childless. Thus he went and prayed to Karniji, who by then was known as a divine child, an incarnation of Shakti, and she blessed him. In due course, a son was born to Suwa.

News of Bhagwati Karniji's miracles soon spread, and people came from far and wide in large numbers seeking her help. They returned healed and content, their prayers answered.

=== Pugal kingdom and Rao Shekha (1402 AD) ===
Pugal, located 80 km west of Bikaner, was ruled by Rao Shekha, a Bhati chieftain, during Karniji's childhood. The small kingdom was frequently raided by the ruler of Multan due to its exposed position to the expanding Rathore domains. Rao Shekha led raids into distant towns and villages of Multan and Sindh to sustain his followers, as resources were scarce in the Thar desert. Despite Multan's punitive raids on Shekha's domains, he was undeterred.

During this period, Karniji's fame had spread to nearby lands and attracted devotees across the region. One such devotee was Rao Shekha's wife, a pious woman devoted to Shakti, and convinced that Bhagwati Karniji was an avatar of Bhagwati Avadji, the Kuldevi of Bhati Rajputs, and urged her husband to seek Karniji's blessings.

On his way to an expedition against his enemies, Rao Shekha stopped at Suwap and sought Karniji's blessings. When he saw a 15-year-old girl with a basket of food, he realised it was Karniji. He and his soldiers dismounted from their horses and camels and bowed before her, seeking blessings and prosperity for their line.

Karniji directed Rao Shekha and his men to wait at the Kotri while she delivered the food to her father, Mehaji. Although Shekha insisted on proceeding with his expedition, Karniji insisted that they stay as guests and have a meal before leaving. Shekha expressed concern that there were around 140 men with him and it might not be possible to feed everyone at the moment. However, he instructed his warriors to take whatever was served and not embarrass the hostess by requesting a second helping.

Karniji then began to serve the meals, and to the amazement of all present, the provisions available more than sufficed for each of the 140 soldiers and their leader. They recalled a similar miracle by Bhagwati Barwadiji, who had fed Maharana Hamir and his army from a single pitcher on their way to Dwarka. Shekha prayed for a similar boon of victory over his more numerous enemies, just as Birwadiji had granted Hamir the boon to recover Chittor from his enemies and the aid of horses by her son Baruji.

After receiving Karniji's blessings and defeating his enemies with ease, Rao Shekha returned to Suwap to express his gratitude to the goddess. He requested that Karniji tie a rakhi to him and accept his gifts, as Rajputs and Charanas are considered brothers and sisters by custom. Initially reluctant, Karniji eventually agreed and tied the rakhi to Shekha.

The legend recounts that Karniji was hesitant because she knew that Shekha would ask for the impossible boon of immortality. When Shekha made this request, Karniji reminded him that even she would have to leave her body eventually and that granting such a boon would go against the principles of Dharma. However, Shekha persisted and asked Karniji to predict his death so that he could prevent it. Karniji warned him that she could not prevent events from taking place, but she did predict the conditions of his death. Vithoo Bhomji of Deshnoke recorded the forecast in Dingal verses:

Translation: Shekha prayed, "Bhagwati, you are an avatar. Make me immortal, kindly grant me your protection." Thus, Karniji replied, "Who is immortal? You shall live so long as you take precautions and do not allow the conjunction of these four circumstances/events viz. (1) Amavasya (2) khimp cot (3) shade of an aak tree, and (4) meat of black ram."

== Marriage ==
In Hindu tradition, girls are typically married by their late teens, and Mehaji Kiniya and Deval Bai were concerned about their daughter Karniji remaining unmarried at the age of 27, which was uncommon. Under pressure from her parents, Karniji agreed to get married. However, finding a suitable groom was challenging due to her reputation as an divine incarnation.

Karniji conveyed to her father through her friend, Suwa Brahman's daughter, that Depaji, the son of Keluji of Rohadiya clan and Jagirdar of Satheeka was an amsha (partial) incarnation of Shiva as a result of Keluji's devotion and penance to Lord Shiva. Only such an incarnation of Lord Shiva could have been considered for holding the hand of Karniji, an Incarnation of Sati (Shakti). The wedding was conducted with traditional customs, including chanting by Brahmins and singing by Damamis, Motisars, and Raos. Negs were given to various village attendants. On an auspicious day, Mehaji proceeded to Keluji's village with the offer of his daughter's hand for Depaji which was promptly and gladly accepted.

The wedding took place in the Suwap village with traditional customs of the community which including brahmins chanting mantras, singing by the Damamis (Mirasi), geet recitation by the Motisars, and Raos (Bhats). Proper rituals were followed and Negs (customary gifts) were given to Brahmins, Motisars, Raos (bhats), Rawals, and Damamis (mirasi) as well as other village attendants including Suthars (Carpenters), Lohars (Blacksmiths), Kumbars (Potters), Meghwals (Messengers), etc.

The wedding took place on Asadh Sudi 9th of Samvat 1473 (1416 AD). While they were on their way to Sathika, Bhagwati Karniji explained to Depaji that she had married out of respect for her parents' wishes, but her physical form was not subject to common bodily feelings and desires. She informed Depaji that he would have to marry another woman for the satisfaction of these needs and to further his line.

In Samvat 1474 (1417 AD), Depaji married Karniji's sister Gulab Bai and their descendants are known as Depawats, who now live in Deshnoke and are descended from the four sons born from Depaji's second marriage.

=== Karnisar (Village Keliya) ===
The wedding party en route to Sathika camped at a few wayside villages. People in large numbers would gather around at these camps and pray to the goddess and ask for advice and blessings to overcome their woes and troubles. At one such village called Keliya, Karniji granted the boon of plentiful water in the village well which since then came to be known as Karnisar.

=== Sathika (1416–1418 AD) ===
Karniji lived at Sathika for two years after her wedding. Her exemplary pious life became a source of inspiration to others.

== Janglu (Jangaldesh) ==
=== Departure from Sathika (1418 AD) ===
Like other villages in the Thar desert, Sathika also suffered from a scarcity of potable water. The village had only one well, which barely sufficed. Water shortages worsened with the arrival of a large herd of about 400 cows and 200 camels as gifts from Mehaji for his two daughters, Karniji and Gulab Bai.

Understanding the situation, Karniji decided to leave the village along with her large household in search of sufficient water and good pasturage. Despite prayers and requests from the villagers to stay, Karniji declined to cancel her departure. She ordered her servants to proceed to Janglu and await her arrival and decision about the future course of action. Thus, on Jeth Sudi 9th of Samvat 1475 (1418 AD), Karniji bade goodbye to Sathika.

=== Arrival at Janglu ===
Karniji arrived at Janglu after a short while. There, the Charans and men of Rao Kanha came into conflict over the usage of a well by the herds of Charans. After an altercation, Rao Kanha's soldiers ran away and reported the incident to their chief. At the time, Rao Kanha was hosting Rao Ranmal, who was the son of Rao Chunda, the founder of the Rathore dynasties of Rajasthan. Ranmal was an ardent devotee of Karniji and paid homage to the goddess on every Shukla Chaturdashi. Ranmal had been deprived of his patrimony due to his father's favoring his other son Satta, Ranmal's half-brother. Consequently, he was biding his time at the village of Chundasar.

Upon learning of Karniji's arrival in Janglu, Rao Ranmal suggested that they both should go and pay respects to the Devi. However, Kanha dismissed the proposal, saying he had no time. Nonetheless, Ranmal ignored Kanha's words and went alone to the Charans' camp to pay respects without starting an argument.

=== Prophecy for Rao Ranmal ===
Rao Ranmal paid homage to Karniji and expressed that he was content with his current situation, even though he felt as unfulfilled as a landless Rajput who was wasting his time in unbecoming pursuits. Karniji reassured Ranmal and revealed his destiny. She prophesied:

"As I see it these lands shall be yours, and you and your descendants shall conquer vast territories and rule happily for generations."

Rao Ranmal thanked Karniji for her blessings, bowed, and returned to Chundasar.

=== Rao Kanha's Demise ===
Rao Kanha became enraged upon learning about the prophecy made for Rao Ranmal. He hadn't forgotten the earlier conflict between his soldiers and the Charans regarding the pasture ground. Earlier, Karniji had declined Ranmal's offer to send cows to his village, stating that the grassland where they were currently camping would be sufficient. Kanha sent his men to ask the Charanas to evict the lands and prevent their cows from consuming pasture which he wanted for his horses. Karniji declined and asked his men to go back and convey her message to Kanha:

"Kanha, you are the son of Rao Chunda and a Rathore. Relations between Vithoo Charanas and Rathore Rajputs are several generations old and very intimate, You have plenty of lands. This Johad is extensive and the grass will more than suffice for your horses and these cows."

Kanha ignored the message and the Charanas did not oblige him. The altercations between the two sides went on for seven months. Finally, Kanha sent his men under Arjun and Vija Udawat to confront the Charanas and regain control of the pasture land. They arrived at Johad land and ordered Karniji's servants to leave but the cowherds ignored them. Enraged, they began hurling abuses at which the Charan men came up in arms and were about to attack Kanha's men when Karniji pacified the Charanas and asked their cowherds to return to their work. However, Arjun and Vija continued with their verbal abuse, at which Karniji thundered, "Jackals, leave this place forthwith."

Immediately, the faces of Arjun and Vija assumed similarity with those of jackals. Kanha's men pleaded they were innocent and returned to Kanha, who decided to take the matter into his own hands. Ranmal, who was incidentally also in Janglu on pilgrimage to Karniji's shrine, pleaded with his brother Kanha to see reason and desist from his unjust intention of driving out the Charanas. Ignoring Ranmal's advice, Kanha assembled 50 horsemen and marched to Karniji's camp. Arriving at the destination, Kanha loudly called out for Karniji referring to her as a "sorceress".

Karniji was meditating in the morning when Kanha's arrival and loud calls caused tension in the camp. People gathered, thinking that Kanha's evil ways were coming to an end. Karniji emerged from her meditation and broke the silence, asking Kanha about his purpose. Kanha replied that he wanted the Charans to leave the land along with their servants and herds. Karniji asked: "How are you harmed, Kanha, by our staying here? We are not depriving you of what is legitimately your due."

Kanha answered: "No, I cannot allow you to stay. Leave my jagir immediately". At which Karniji replied, "Very well. I may agree but you know I am a devotee of Bhagwati Avadji and camped here under divine guidance. My prayer kit is in this vicker box. If Avadji allows you to put it on the cart, I will leave willingly."

Kanha ordered one of his men to put the box in the cart, but he failed to even lift it. More men tried and failed and finally all 50 men alighted from their horses tied a rope to the box and together pulled, but in vain. Thereupon Karniji said, "The wishes of Avadji are clear. She does not want us to leave this place. You have been instrumental in damaging one of the legs of this venerable box. By knocking off a portion of the box, you have knocked off a part of your life."

Kanha termed this a trick and said, "If you are really an incarnation, as people say, let me know when I shall die." Karniji warned Kanha to abandon his foolish path, but Kanha did not listen and even ridiculed Karniji. Karniji prophesied that Kanha would die within 6 months, but Kanha laughed it off. As time passed, the prediction became 2 months, 2 days, and then just a day. Finally, Karniji drew a line on the ground with a twig and said, "If you insist on proceeding to your doom, cross this line and you will die."

Kanha, adamant with his abusive language and insolent behaviour, rode towards the front lines on his horse. However, as soon as he reached the line, there was a thunderous noise and a lion appeared, dealing the death blow to Kanha. He fell across the line, vomiting blood and lying dead. The remaining soldiers fled, but when they looked back, they saw Karniji standing at the place where the lion had appeared, holding a trident.

=== Karniji declares Rao Ridmal as ruler of Janglu (1418 AD) ===
Ranmal, who was present in Janglu, arrived at Johad in the camp of Charanas after learning of the events that took place and attended the cremation of Rao Kanha.

He then went to Karniji's camp, and after bowing and respectfully touching Karniji's feet, he sat down. Karniji rose up and declared Ranmal as the new ruler of Janglu and prophesied that he shall, in due time, become king of Mandore as well. This took place on Falgun Sudi 14th of Samvat 1475 (1418 AD). She advised him to approach his stepmother (mother of Kanha), to accept her terms of serving her as a son in her old age and ascend the throne of Janglu as her adopted son.

Rao Ranmal, as the new ruler of Janglu, offered to share Janglu immediately and the Kingdom of Mandore when conquered with, Karniji as patron deity. Declining the offer, Karniji informed him that acquisition of territories was not her mission. The Johad in their occupancy was enough for her beloved cows. Governance of territories was the proper domain of Rajas and Rao Ranmal was fully entitled to the prerogatives & privileges of the kingdom that he acquired with his arms and the blessings of Avad Mata.

== Deshnoke ==
=== Foundation of Deshnoke (1419 AD) ===
From the time they first arrived in Janglu, Karniji and her followers were living in cottage settlement around which the present Nehriji Temple is situated. This settlement was called Karniji's Dhani. Realising the need for a permanent settlement, a place with enough underground water about a mile east of the Dhani was selected and on Vaisakh Sudi 2nd of Samvat 1476 (1419 AD), Karniji laid the foundation of Deshnoke. Initially, Rao Ranmal suggested the name Deshoat meaning "Shield of the land" hoping that true to this name it would protect his kingdom. However, Karniji stated that kingdoms will belong to their rulers so long as they depend on their own might and fight for moral values. Therefore, she named the village as Deshnak (Nose of the Land), to be as important to the Marwar kingdom of Rathores as a nose is to an honorable man. In course of time, the village Deshnak came to be known as Deshnoke.

Karniji focused her attention on the improvement of Deshnoke. The surrounding forest mostly had old Jal trees that were not good for cattle and were decaying due to age. The people of Deshnoke used wood as fuel, damaging healthy branches and trees. Karniji was worried that overuse and mismanagement of the forest would cause it to be lost. To prevent this, she replaced the old Jal trees with useful Ber trees and protected the new plantation. Fuel for the village was to come from fallen dead branches of Jal trees, and cutting or using Ber trees for fuel was not allowed. This decision resulted in an extensive grove of Ber trees around Deshnoke and Sri Nehriji temple, which saved the town from desertification in later centuries.

=== Depawats of Deshnoke ===
With the permission of Karniji, Depaji married a second time to Karniji's sister, Gulab Bai, to ensure continuity of his line. They had four sons: Punya Raj (1477 VS), Naga Raj (1483 VS), Siddha Raj (1489 VS), and Laxman Raj (1500 VS).

All the four sons married, and their descendants populate the town of Deshnoke. The eldest Punya Raj, who had four sons, married at Sinla in the Sandu clan while the other three viz: Nag Raj, Sidh Raj, and Laxman Raj married respectively in the Lalas, Khiriya and Khiriya clans residing in their respective sasan villages Judiya, Kanwalian, and again Kanwalian. These descendants of Depaji are known as Depawat who are the traditional priests of the Karni Mata temple at Deshnoke.

=== Passing of Depaji (1454 AD) ===
Karniji's father-in-law Keluji Rohadiya died in Samvat 1500 (1443 AD). Friends and relatives, including Ranmal's sons Jodha and his brothers, paid condolence visits. Depaji Rohadiya died 11 years later in 1454 AD. On his demise, Karniji's attire changed to the traditional clothing of a widow, a brown rough cloth called lovadi and a light brown lambi angarakhi.

=== Reviving Laxman (1467 AD) ===
Laxman Raj, the youngest son was fond of travelling. In Samvat 1524 (1467 AD), he went to Kolayat fair held on Sudi Chaturdashi of the month of Kartik where he drowned in the tank while taking a bath. His dead body was recovered and taken to Deshnoke where his mother Gulab Bai, stricken with grief, brought the dead body to Karniji hoping for a miracle. Karniji had the body put inside the cottage where she sat down in meditation. For three days, it is said, the cottage remained closed and Karniji did not give darshan to anyone. Anxious relatives and devotees kept a constant vigil outside. On the fourth day, at sunrise, Laxman opened the door and to the joy and amazement of everyone, walked out. At the same time, to assure Gulab Bai, Karniji promised to protect the children during the period of her life on earth.

In order to revive Laxman, Karniji had to travel to the yamloka and asked Yamraja (god of death) to give back her son. Yamraja refused and stated his inability to do so since it would be against the rules of the underworld. The soul of a dead person would have to take birth into thousands of yonis before being born as a human again. Karniji took Laxman with her anyway, breaking the birth cycle for him. As a result, Karniji ordained that her Charan devotees, after death, will be reborn as mice in Deshnoke before being reborn as humans again.

== Ranmal and Mandore ==
=== Ranmal's attempt on Mandore (1430 AD) ===
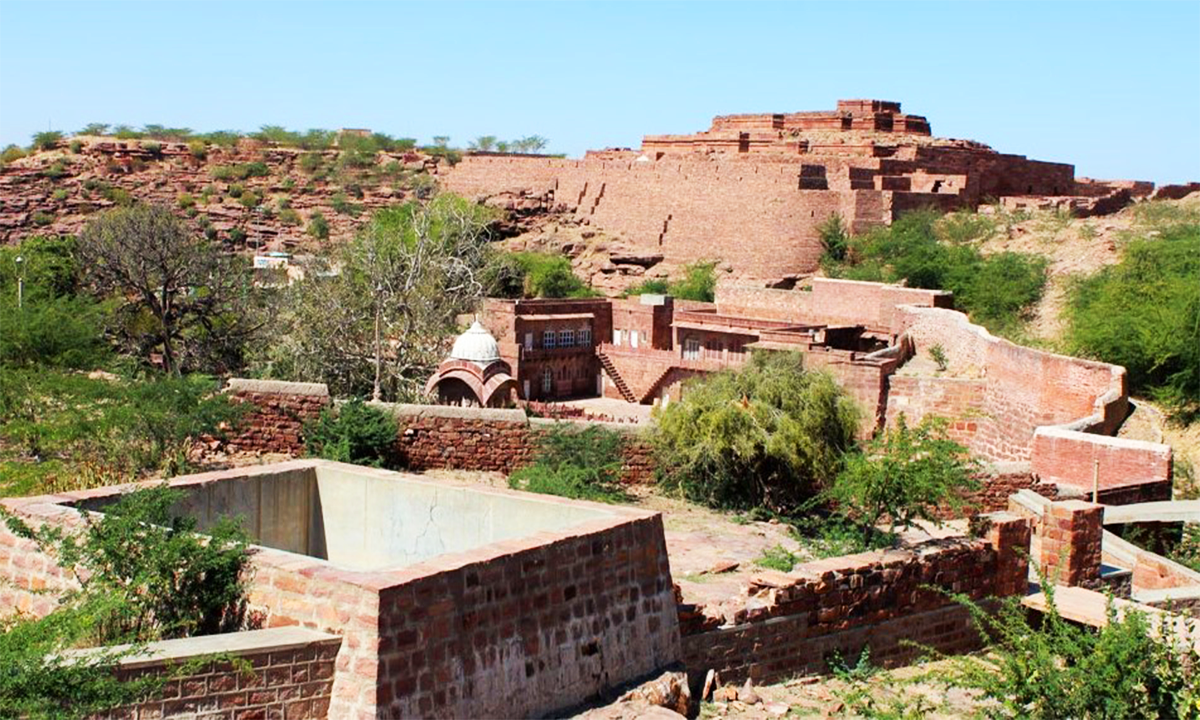
Mandore Fort

On Chaitra Sudi 7th of Samvat 1487 (1430 AD), while on his periodic pilgrimages, Rao Ranmal expressed his desire to take Mandore from Satta and sought her blessings. Despite Karniji's warning that it might take months, Ranmal quickly prepared by obtaining 5000 horses from his nephew Rana Mokal, the ruler of Chittor, who owed him a debt. He left 500 horsemen to guard Janglu and marched to Mandore with 500 of his other horsemen and the 5000 horses from Chittor.

Satta, the son of Rao Chunda who ruled Mandore, learned that Ranmal was approaching with troops. Satta's emissary Randhir contacted Mohammed Khan Khokhar, who was then ruling Nagaur on behalf of Sikander Lodi. Khokhar saw an opportunity to cause conflict among the heirs of Rao Chunda due to his growing fear of Rathore's increasing power. Together with Satta's son Narbad and 3000 horsemen, they met Ranmal's invading force of 7000 soldiers at the frontier. Ranmal's men fought Kohokar's, while the Mewar force contended with troops under Narbad. Ranmal retreated when the Mewar horsemen fared poorly against Narbad's troops, saving his Mewar allies from defeat and preserving forces for better times.

He strengthened the defences of Janglu and sought advice from Karniji in Deshnoke. Karniji reminded him that he should have waited and prepared before trying to take over Mandore. Karniji assured him that Satta could not march on Janglu and that Ranmal need not worry about the safety of his new capital, despite Satta's success in the recent battle.

"Do not, however, give way to despondency. You are fated to recover and rule Mandore. Soon the situation will take a turn for the better. Satta will fall out with Randhir, his chief supporter and the latter shall be the cause of the former's downfall as he was the cause of his good fortune."

=== Conquest of Mandore (1430 AD) ===
After defeating Ranmal, Randhir accompanied Satta to Mandore and demanded half of the revenue share claiming the victory was attributable primarily to his help. Satta agreed, but secretly plotted with his son Narbad to kill Randhir and his son Napa. They poisoned Napa, through a maidservant leading to his death, and then attacked Randhir, who managed to escape to Chittor.

At Chittor, Rao Ranmal was acting as the regent to the Maharana. He received Randhir who told him of the events transpired. Promising to avenge his son's death, Ranmal secured the loyalty of Randhir who now accepted Ranmal's claim to Mandore. After securing a strong force, Rao Ranmal invoked the blessings of Karniji and once again marched against Satta. In a fierce battle between the Rathore kinsmen, Satta's forces led by commanders Chotha and Jeeya fought valiantly but lost when the two Inda commanders fell. Satta's son Narbad was gravely injured and carried from the field while Satta fled to Pipar and was captured. Ranmal arrived at Mandore, captured it, and declared himself ruler.

Ranmal despatched his prisoners Satta and Narbad to Chittor with the Maharana's army and proceeded to Deshnoke for Karniji's blessings.

== Polity in Marwar ==
The first Rathore kingdom of Jodhpur in Rajputana was founded by Rao Jodha, but the Rathores had already established a foothold thanks to Rao Siha Setramot, a descendant of Jaichand of Kannauj. Chunda, Siha's descendant, was the first Rathore ruler to acquire a fort, Mandore, from its previous rulers, the Inda Pratiharas, through the help of a Charan named Alhaji Barhath.

Rao Chunda visited Suwap in Vikram Samvat 1463 (1406 AD) to seek Karniji's blessing. He had 14 sons, with the eldest being Rao Ranmal. Chunda took control of Nagaur in Vikram Samvat 1465 (1408 AD) and decided to stay there, leaving Mandore to one of his sons. Chunda's sons wanted Ranmal to succeed him, but the fourth brother Randhir favored Satta, who was born of the favored queen. Randhir succeeded in depriving Ranmal of his inheritance, putting Satta in charge of Mandore while Rao Chunda established his headquarters at Nagaur. Ranmal settled in Chundasar, founded by his father with a promise of a jagir to be granted later.

Chunda's aggressive expansion led to an alliance against him by surrounding chieftains. The Rao of Pugal, Sankhlas of Janglu, and Khidar Khan of Multan attacked him unexpectedly at Nagaur. Chunda charged his enemies and was killed in action on Vaisakh Badi 15 Vikram Samvat 1470 (1413 AD).

== Assassination of Ranmal (1438 AD) ==
Rao Chunda's favorite son, Satta, succeeded him as the king of Mandore. Meanwhile, Ranmal, his eldest son, joined the court of his brother-in-law, Lakha Singh of Mewar, where he gained influence and became regent for his nephew, Mokal Singh. After returning to Marwar in 1428, Ranmal defeated Satta and captured Mandore in 1430. He then took over governance of Mewar in the name of Mokal's son, Kumbha, after Mokal Singh's assassination. However, his Rathore influence in the Sisodia kingdom caused resentment among Mewar nobles. Ranmal's arrogance led him to claim the kingdom of Mewar for himself and order the murder of a Mewari prince, resulting in a coup against him in 1438 and his subsequent assassination, followed by the invasion of Marwar.

Prince Jodha, the son of Ranmal, fled Chittor after it was invaded by Sisodia forces. He left Mandore with as much treasure as he could carry and sought the blessings and advice of the Rathores' patron deity, Shri Karniji. After reaching Deshnok, he narrated how his father was assassinated due to the suspicion of the Maharana and Mewar nobles. Karniji condemned Ranmal's conduct and urged Jodha to lead a life of moral rectitude. She assured him that by serving Dharma, he would be able to reconquer Mandore.

"For the time being," she said, "you should repair to Janglu, which shall always be beyond the pale of the Sisodia's swords." He repaired to Janglu, fortified its defenses, and began preparations to avenge his father's death and reclaim Mandore.

== Kingdom of Jodhpur ==
=== Coronation of Jodha (1439 AD) ===
Due to the weakening of Rathore power after the Sisodia assault on Mandore, Rathore chiefs set aside their internal feuds and rallied under the banner of Jodha. At Kavani, Rathore clansmen collectively decided to declare Jodha as Rao and successor to Rao Ranmal. Emissaries were sent and Karniji was requested to apply the Tilak but instead, she sent her sons with Pugree Dastoor to Kavani.

Therefore, on Kartik Vadi 5th of Samvat 1496 (1439 AD), Jodha was put on the Rathore throne and declared the Rao. On the request of the assemblage, Karniji's son Punya Raj, on her behalf, performed the ceremony and applied the Raj-Tilak. Punya Raj gave five leaves of Jhadberi as Karniji's gift which Jodha respectfully put in the Pugree that he had received from Karniji. After the ceremony, Jodha proceeded to Deshnoke, paid respects to Karniji, and obtained her blessings.

=== Jodha captures Mandore (1453 AD) ===
Mandore was occupied by Sisodia forces and Narbad, stationed there on behalf of Maharana of Mewar, attempted to capture Jodha for the next 12 years. Narbad frequently left his flanks exposed and the route to Mandore ill-defended to entice Jodha to attack, but Karniji had warned Jodha to wait until given the all clear. Thus forewarned, Rao Jodha bided his time at Kavani for 12 years.

One day in Samvat 1510 (1453 AD), Karniji sent a message to Rao Jodha asking him to promptly reach Deshnoke with as many Rathores as he could muster. Accordingly, he reached Deshnoke and appearing before Karniji sought advice and directions. Karniji told him that the opprtune time for invading Mandore had arrived and he must march with his men towards Mandore.

While on the way to Mandore, Jodha camped at Modhi Moolani in village Sirdan where he was served halwa dish by Modhi. Modhi reassured him of victory and urged him to proceed to Mandore. Jodha's next stop was at Bengati where Harbuji Sankhla, a holy man, offered his men bajra khichri. Harbuji also reassured Jodha of victory with Karniji's blessings and Jodha continued his journey with help from chiefs of other estates and villages on the way.

Jodha arrived at Mandore with 700 horses and 10,000 foot soldiers. With the help of Kalu Mangalia, an insider for the enemy, Jodha entered the citadel with 1,000 men. These men let in the rest of the army at night and attacked the fort from within. The Sisodias and their Rathore supporters were caught off guard and by sunrise, Jodha had taken over Mandore. The next day, Rao Kandhal (Jodha's brother) attacked the nearest Sisodia outpost at Chokri. He then marched his army on Merta and Ajmer, which he conquered over the course of a year Samvat 1510 (1453 AD). Thus, Rao Jodha was able to reconquer his inheritance & restrengthened the Rathores in Marwar.

=== Foundation of Jodhpur – Mehrangarh Fort (1459 AD) ===
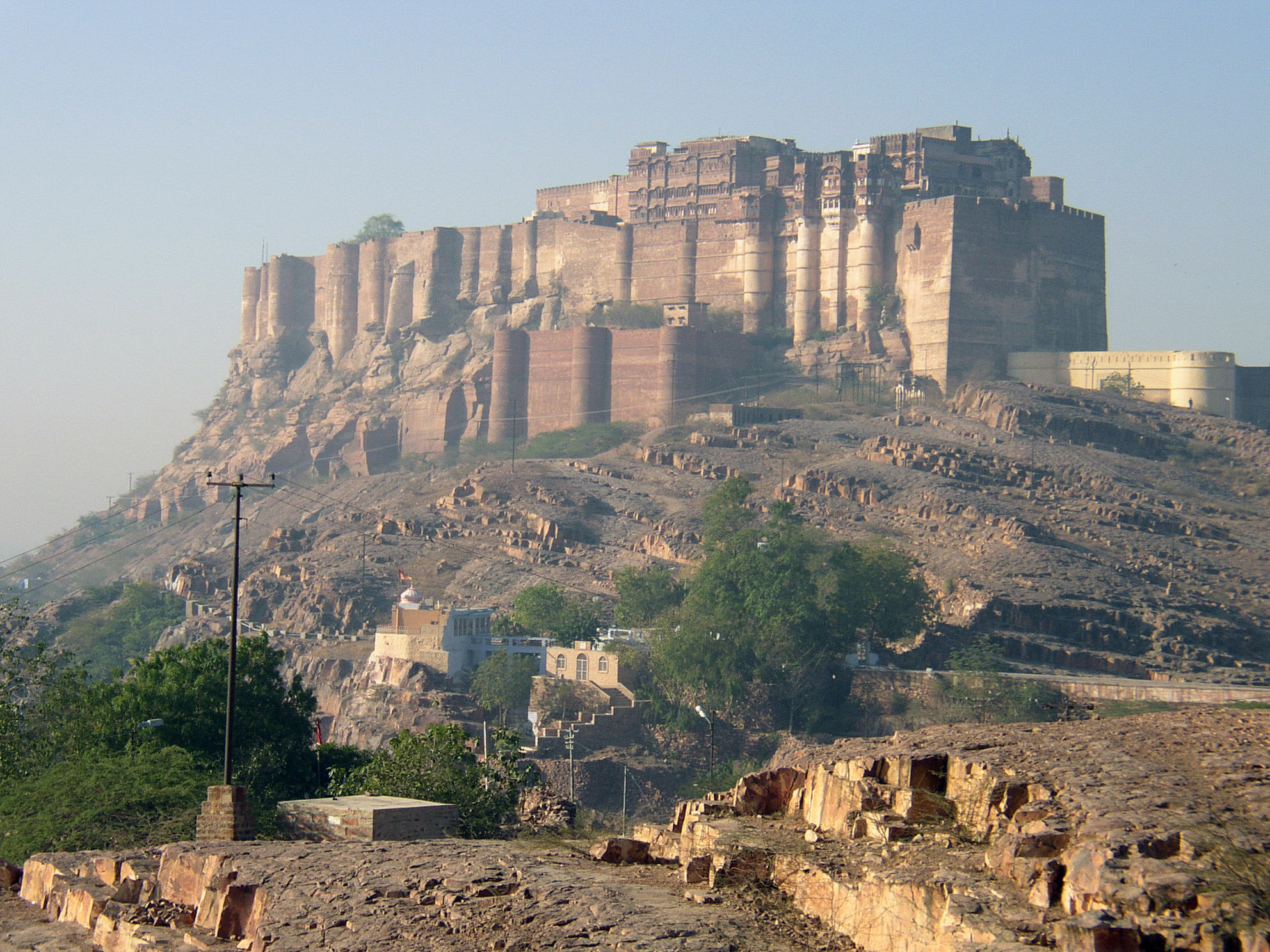
Mehrangarh Fort

Rao Jodha was an ambitious ruler and Mandore and its fort were not adequate since he had plans for a larger capital commanded by a stronger fort. He chose a site five miles away, which had low hills for protection and a view above the adjacent hills and terrain. An ascetic named Jogi Chidyanath lived there and refused to move when asked. So Rao Jodha sought help from Karniji. Amaraji Barhath (whom Rao Jodha addressed as 'Kakosa' and also a close ally of Jodha), was chosen to personally carry the invitation to Deshnoke because of his high status, and the fact that he belonged to the clan in which Karniji was married. Amaraji was accompanied by the Rajpurohit of the Rathores (the estate holder of Tinwari) whose ancestors came with Rao Siha to Marwar. They soon reached Deshnoke and conveyed the invitation to Karniji, which was accepted.

A royal reception was held from the site of the fort to village Chopasani near to the Amaraji's estate Mathania. Rao Jodha advanced up to Chopasani to receive the guests from Deshnoke and escort his tutelary deity Karniji to the site where on Jeth Sud 11th of Samvat 1515 (1459 AD), a Thursday, Karniji laid the foundation of the fort and the city of Jodhpur at an auspicious hour. Seeing a superior power, Jogi Chidyanath left the place at once.

The assembled Rathore clansmen while paying respectful homage to Karniji with one voice solicited blessings for their dynasty to rule until eternity. Karniji replied that it was impossible, as even incarnations like Lord Rama and Krishna and great souls like Yudhishthira and Ikshvaku had to bow to destiny. Kingdoms change hands according to the theory of Karma and those who misuse power are replaced by those who earned virtue in their previous lives. Jodha then asked to foresee the future of his dynasty. The Goddess thereupon, reportedly, prophesied, "This fort and Jodhpur shall be ruled for 28 generations by your descendants. The generations that follow shall live as Bhomias."

== Kingdom of Bikaner ==
=== In search of a kingdom (1465 AD) ===
Rao Jodha, proud of the new capital Jodhpur and a chain of victories had decided to expand his kingdom's boundaries through further conquests. Jodha has 20 sons one of whom was Rao Bika. One day, Jodha saw his brother Rao Kandhal in conversation with Rao Bika and jokingly enquired if Kandhal was secretly planning to conquer new territory and put his favorite nephew on the throne. The tradition proud Kandhal took this seriously as a challenge and took upon himself the responsibility of carving a kingdom for his nephew Bika. They left Jodhpur on Dussehra day of Samvat 1522 (1465 AD) with 400 horses and Kandhal proclaimed he wouldn't return until Bika had a kingdom.

=== Deshnoke-Chundasar-Kodamdesar ===
Since childhood, Bika was a devoted believer in Karniji's blessings and carried an idol of Bhairava with him. He proceeded to Deshnoke with his uncles and soldiers and sought blessings for success in their ventures. Rao Kandhal spoke, "Bhuvaji (aunt), we left Jodhpur on the strength of our faith in your protection. Your sanctuary was our destination. We are at your command ready to fight for the establishment of Dharma. Kindly direct us to the destiny of Rajputs. We abide by your directions."

The goddess blessed Bika and said that he would have a brilliant future in these lands, greater than that of his father. He was to wait at Chundasar, worshipping the Bhairava idol he carried and not be hasty or covetous like his grandfather Ranmal and await further instructions for the next venture.

Bika and Kandhal spent three years at Chundasar organizing and arming their contingents. When during this sojourn, Bika's queen conceived, they then moved to Deshnoke, where on Magh Shukla 10th of Samvat 1526 (1469 AD), Bika's queen gave birth to a son. They stayed a few more years at Deshnoke in the worship and service of Karniji, and then Karniji directed them to proceed to Kodamdesar and install their Bhairava idol. Bika and Kandhal arrived at Kodamdesar with their families and soldiers and settled there, installing the idol of Bhairava at the banks of Kodamdesar lake.

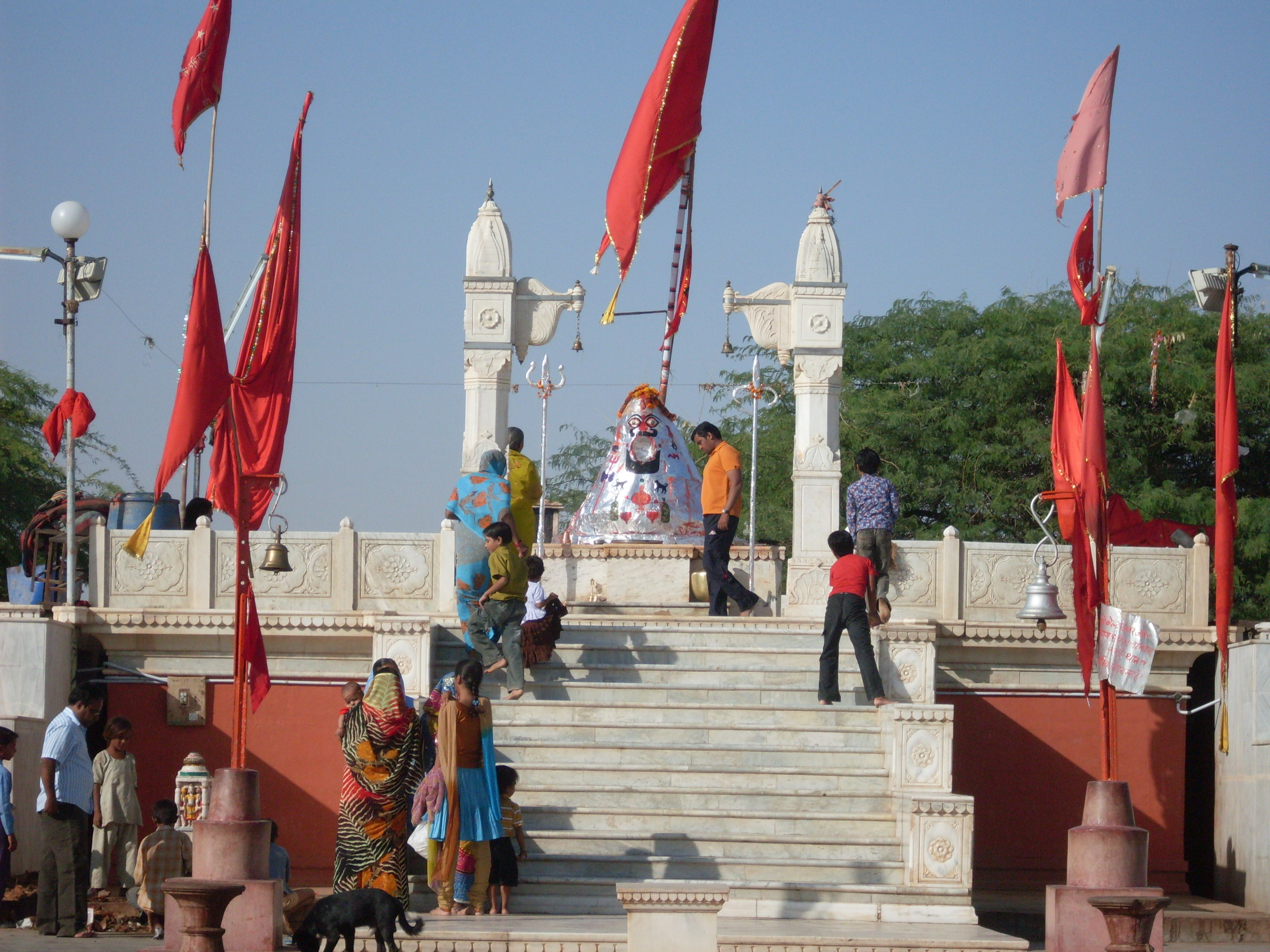
Bhairav Temple at Kodamdesar

=== Kodamdesar Fort (1480 AD) ===
Bika installed the idol of Bhairava at Kodamdesar and planned to build a fort around the shrine. The Bhatis under Rao Shekha of Pugal opposed the move and the Baghodas, another Rajput clan joined them and began preparations for war. Bika proceeded to Deshnoke to consult Karniji and narrated the design of his opponents' plan and requested her to accompany him to Kodamdesar as, he believed, her presence would deter his opponent Rajput chieftains from attacking.

Karniji faced a dilemma when asked to approve Rao Bika's request to build a fort at Kodamdesar, as it threatened the neighboring kingdoms, including Pugal whose ruler was her devotee and sworn-brother, Rao Shekha. Therefore, while predicting his success, Karniji advised him to drop the idea of constructing the fort at Kodamdesar.

Shortly after, Rao Shekha visited Karniji to seek her blessings for the inevitable battle. Karniji predicted that Rao Bika would ultimately win. When Rao Kelan of Tanot called for war, Rao Shekha feigned illness and dropped out of the Bhati alliance, causing a significant reduction in the attacking force. Despite this setback, Kelan continued preparations for the attack. Before the battle, the old Rao Kelan traveled to Deshnoke to pay homage and seek blessings. Karniji replied, "You shall have what a brave Rajput desires most - a heroic and glorious death on the battlefield."

The valiant Rao Kelan, 80 at the time, returned to his camp and led 2000 Bhatis and Baghodas to march on Kodamdesar. They were met by Bika and his 500 warriors including his uncle Kandhal and Mandla, brother Bida and Sankhla Napa. Rathores won the battle and Rao Kelan died fighting until the last. Bhatis lost 300 men but continued guerrilla warfare and Rao Bika was compelled to approach Karniji at Deshnoke and sought her intervention.Karniji advised him drop the idea of building a fort at Kodamdesar and thus make a victor's gesture towards the Bhatis, as this is necessary for peace and prosperity in the land and meeting the threat from Multan and Delhi.

=== Rathore-Bhati alliance ===
To maintain peace and prosperity, an alliance between Bhatis and Rathores was needed. Since, Bhatis had stopped raiding Bika's territory and Bika had abandoned the fort construction, Karniji advised Rao Shekha that Princess Rangkunwari be married to Rao Bika. However, Shekha was hurt by the proposal and stating that it was insulting. He explained that Bika was not the heir to Rao Jodha's throne because he had given up his rights of succession to the kingdom, and was now just a wandering prince. Meanwhile, Shekha was a ruler and felt it would be unacceptable for her daughter to marry a disinherited prince. He would lose face among his people for such a proposal.

However, a few days later, Shekha made a plundering raid on Multan but was taken prisoner. Shekha was held captive for two years, despite failed escape attempts by his supporters. His wife prayed to Karniji for help, as she couldn't bear to see her husband suffer any longer. In a dream, Karniji advised her to marry their daughter to Rao Bika in order to secure Shekha's freedom. The family sought advice from their kinsmen, and traveled to Deshnoke to seek instructions from Karniji. After paying their respects, they asked for Karniji's suggestion for a spouse for their daughter.

Karniji said, "I had expressed before Shekha my desire of seeing her united with Rao Bika, but he did not agree." Shekha's wife replied, "According to our custom, a mother has a prior say about the daughter's fate, and that of the son is linked with the father. In exercise of this right, I accept your proposal and would abide by the promise till the last." Thus, the marriage between royal families of Bhati and Rathore was fixed at the behest of Karniji and a suitable date was chosen for nuptials.

=== Release of Rao Shekha from Multan (1482 AD) ===
The wedding rituals began, but there was no one to perform Kanyadan as Rao Shekha was still a prisoner in Multan. Meanwhile, Rao Shekha was stuck in the Multan prison and had lost all hope of escape. Believing his end was near, he invoked Karniji thus:

"O Karniji! appear as a samali and free me from this bondage."

Using her divine power, Karniji appeared before the prisoner Rao Shekha in Multan with a trident in hand. Shekha prostrated before her, amazed by her presence and answering his prayers. Karniji freed Shekha and took him to the nuptial grounds of the wedding in Pugal, where Shekha was surprised by the marriage festivities. He performed the Kanyadan ceremony, giving his daughter to the bridegroom Rao Bika. The wedding united the families and created an alliance, with Karniji swearing the Rathores and Bhatis to a lasting friendship and asking Rao Shekha to forget his objections to the marriage. The wedding was solemnized in Samvat 1539 (1482 AD).

=== Founding of Bikaner (1485 AD) ===
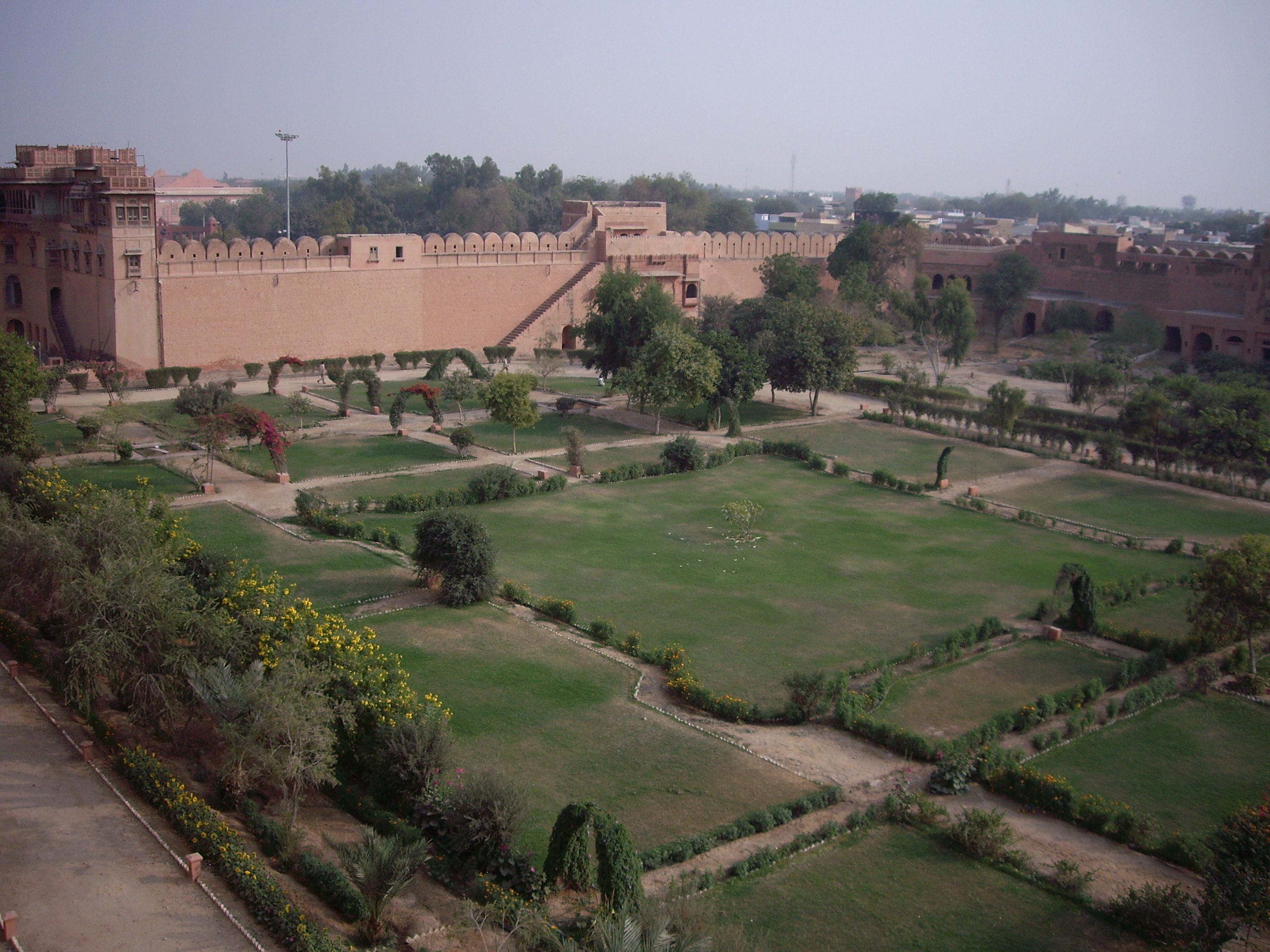
Gardens of Junagarh Fort, Bikaner

During one his homages to Deshnoke in Samvat 1540 (1483 AD), Karniji predicted that a quarrel would soon start between the Jat principalities and advised Bika to offer shelter and assistance to those who sought it. This prediction came true when Pandu Godara sought Rao Bika's help against rival Jat tribes who had taken his territory. Thanks to Karniji's warning, Bika was able to promise assistance on the condition that Pandu accept Rathore protection. The anti-Pandu alliance, however, enlisted the help of Tanwar Rajputs and the combined forces of the Tanwars and Jat chiefs met the Rathores at Dhenka. Rao Bika emerged victorious, the Tanwar chiefs killed and the battle, adding 720 villages to his kingdom.

Karniji's desire to see order and peace in the region that was prey to frequent feuds and looting was thus fulfilled by her devotee Rao Bika. The victorious Bika came to Deshnoke to seek blessings where Karniji advised him to formally lay the foundations of his kingdom by building his capital. A site was suggested near the meeting point of roads connecting Multan with Nagaur and Ajmer.

For the fort, Bika selected the rati ghati (the red pass) and requested the Goddess to lay the foundation. Thus, Karniji, in Samvat 1542 (1485 AD) laid the foundations of the Bikaner citadel, the second Rathore kingdom of the Thar desert.

=== Coronation of Rao Bika ===
When the Bikaner fort and capital were completed, Karniji was approached for gracing the coronation of Rao Bika. However, similar to the coronation of Rao Ranmal and Rao Jodha, she sent Punya Raj to represent her instead. Punya Raj conveyed her blessing and gave five leaves of a Jhadberi tree as a gift ensuring peace and prosperity to the kingdom. On the following day of the coronation, Rao Bika and his family paid homage to Karni Mata in Deshnoke. Karniji gave blessings for a prosperous reign and advised him to remember the obligations and selfless services of Rao Kandhal.

=== Prediction to Rao Loonkaran ===
Rao Bika ruled until Samvat 1561 (1504 AD) and was succeeded by his son Loonkaran. Karniji declined to attend Loonkaran's coronation and was represented by Punya Raj who applied tilak to the new Rao. While Rao Bika was in power, Loonkaran and his sons Jaitsi, Pratapsi, Bersi, Ratansi, and Tejsi traveled to Deshnoke to pay homage to Karni Mata. Karniji then made a prediction:

"Jaitsi shall have numerous progenies and head the clan, Bersi and his descendants would be extraordinarily brave and vindicate the clan's honor, Partap would be so so while Ratansi and progeny will win prestige."

In 1526 AD, Loonkaran planned an attack on Narnaul and sought Karniji's guidance. Despite her advice against the venture, Loonkaran went ahead with the attack and died fighting at Dhosi on Srawan Vadi 4th of Samvat 1583. After his father's death, Rao Jaitsi became the ruler of the kingdom and paid homage to Karniji at Deshnoke on Asoj Sudi 14 V.S. 1583 (1526 AD).

== Later days and mahaprayana ==
Like the Rathore rulers of Marwar and Bikaner, the Bhati rulers of Jaisalmer and Pugal also had strong faith in Karniji. The rulers of Jaisalmer, Chachagdev, Devidas, Ghadsi and Jaitasi had paid homage and sough blessings from Karniji at Deshnoke.

=== The frontier of Bikaner and Jaisalmer ===
After the Bikaner kingdom was established in Samvat 1541 (1484 AD), a dispute arose over the boundary between the villages of Gadhiyala in Bikaner and Girachar in Jaisalmer. Despite arbitration, a snide remark from the Rathore side enraged the Bhatis of Jaisalmer, leading to a full declaration of war between the two kingdoms.

Seeing the peace of the region threatened, Karniji intervened and declared the Dhineru talai and catchment between the villages of Gadhiyala and Girachar as a no man's land between the two kingdoms and serve as pasture ground for the cattle. She further declared that she would breathe her last near the Dhineru talai and the boundary pillar between the two kingdoms should be installed at the spot.

=== Visit to Jaisalmer (1537 AD) ===
Karniji used to worship the goddess Avad Mata. There are 52 dhams (pilgrimage sites) in the Jaisalmer state of Avad Mata. Out of these, Karniji had a strong faith in Temra Rai (another name of Avad Mata) and from time to time she used to go to Temra Rai Temple for darshan. Sometime after Navratri of Samvat 1594 (1537 AD), she made a pilgrimage to Temra Rai Temple. At that time, the ruler of Jaisalmer was Maharawal Jaitsi, who was suffering from a chronic boil (tumor). Knowing that the end time was near, he expressed desire to have final darshan of Karni Mata. When Maharawal Jaitsi heard the news of Karniji's arrival to Temra Rai, in spite of being in pain, he travelled all the way himself to see Karniji and bowing his head at her feet, he said "You have done me a great favor by giving me darshan at the last moment because now my death is near."

At the same time, Karniji moved her hand on the back of bowing Maharawal and gave a boon that you will not die from this disease and you will start curing from today. In few days, the disease left Jaitsi's body and he started getting healthy.The grateful Maharawal Jaitsi respectfully presented a village to Karniji which she granted to a Solanki Rajput before leaving.

=== Pratima of Karni Mata ===
Karniji was now 150 years old. She bid adeau to her family and embarked on a final journey to Jaisalmer and Amarkot. In the beginning of the Magh month of 1594 VS (1537 AD), Karniji left Deshnoke to visit Temra Rai in Jaisalmer and Bahuchara and Boot Bhawani in Kharoda of Amarkot-Sindh. She was accompanied by her eldest son Punya Raj, charioteer Sarang Vishnoi, a Daroga servant and other attendants.

During her stay at Jaisalmer, Karniji called on her devotee Bana Suthar, who was blind since birth, and in the following words directed him to prepare her Pratima (statue):

"The desires and lusts of the world have not touched you as you are born blind. You are also my devotee. Hence you are the proper person to draw my likeness on a stone for the benefit of posterity. Your sight will be restored, for the present, temporarily to see and remember my likeness in your mind. Your sight will be permanently restored when the Pratima is ready and installed at Deshnoke after my departure from earth."

=== Journey to Kharoda-Sindh ===
The travelers proceeded from Jaisalmer to Kharoda (Sindh), where Karniji stayed with sister goddesses Bahuchara and Boot Bhawani for twelve days. Karni Mata's cousin, Deval Mata, had two daughters, Boot and Bahuchara, who are also considered incarnations of Shakti.

After bidding farewell, the group turned back towards Deshnoke and eventually reached Bengati, where Karniji called on the pious Rajput saint Harbuji Sankhla. After a stay of two days, the journey was resumed.

=== Mahaprayana (1538 AD) ===
On Chaitra Shukla 9th of Samvat 1595 (1538 AD), after an overnight journey, Karniji's entourage reached Dhineru talai-the place Karniji declared as the no man's land between the kingdoms of Bikaner and Jaisalmer. It is at this place that Karniji is said to have disappeared into a flame at the age of 151 years.

"The sun was about to rise. She had Her chariot stopped and asked Punya Raj to arrange water for her bath. Unable to find water at hand, he proceeded as directed to get some from the nearby Dhineru talai. She then asked Sarang Vishnoi to look for water in the silver pitcher. It had only a few drops. Sarang was directed to pour it on Shri Karniji who sat in meditation facing the east and the rising sun. As the sun emerged in the east, the water poured from the pitcher touched her head and with it appeared a flame sublimating the physical form which became a part of the Universal Flame."

=== The Karni Mata Temple (1538 AD) ===
After Karni Mata's mahaprayana, her son Punya Raj and other attendants returned to Deshnoke. On the fourth day, Banna Suthar arrived with the pratima (idol) of Karni Mata and on Chaitra Shukla 14 Thursday of V.S. 1595 (1538 AD), the idol was installed in a temple according to the orders of Karniji, which became the most important pilgrimage site for the devotees of Karni Mata.

== Other Miracles ==
=== Saving Jagdu Shah (1459 AD) ===
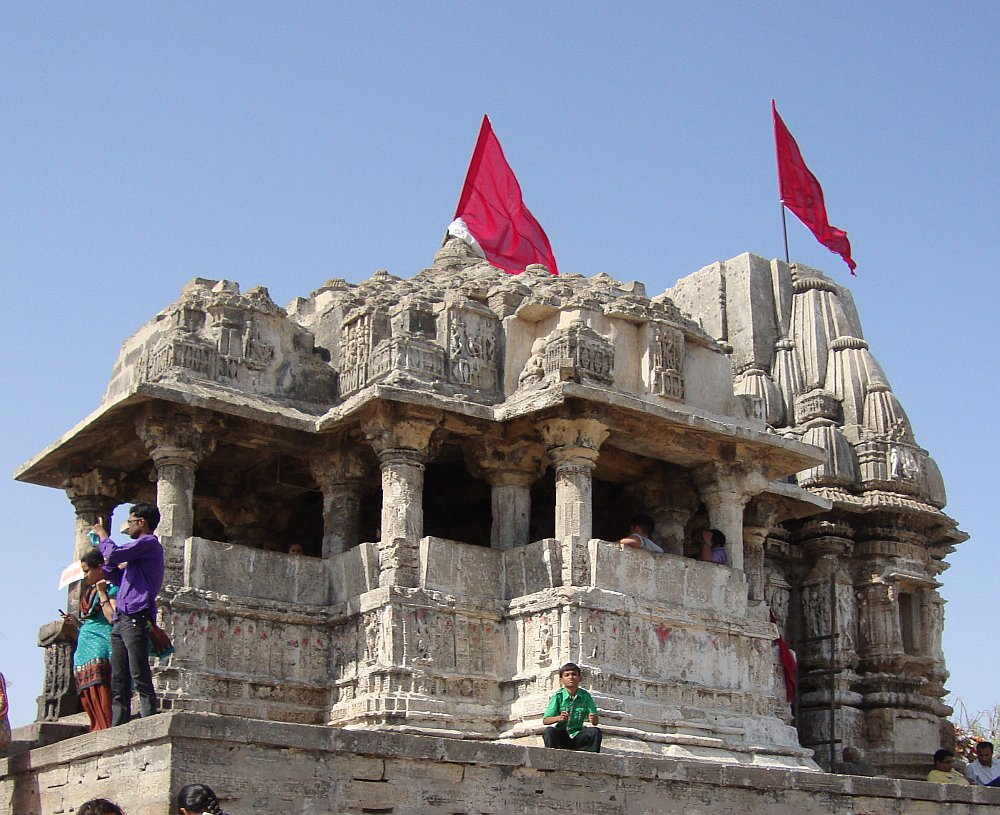
The old Goddess Harshad Temple on Koyal hill is accredited to Jagadu Shah.

Jagdu Shah was a prosperous Maheshwari Jain merchant of Chittor. He fled to Khinvsar near Nagaur after falling out of favor with Maharana Mokal. In Khinvsar, he sought the blessings of the goddess Karniji, whom he had heard of while in Chittor. Karniji was pleased with his devotion and assured him of safety from Maharana's wrath. She also promised him protection from future accidents and mishaps if he continued to lead a pious and good life, stating that God always comes to the rescue of his devotees.

Satisfied, Jagdu Shah returned home. He prospered, his ships brought merchandise & caravans carried them to trade markets scattered all over the region. His business required a lot of traveling. While travelling on one such journey in Samvat 1516 (1459 AD), his ship was caught in a perilous storm. The ship seemed to be fragile against the force of storm and the crew prayed for divine mercy. This reminded Jagdu Shah of the assurance given by his patron deity Karniji. He invoked her name and the legend states that Karniji rescued the floundering ship by milking a cow with one hand and saving Jagdu Shah and his people with the other.

Soon after reaching port, Jagdu Shah proceeded to Deshnoke to pay homage. He narrated to anxious listeners how his ship was saved from a storm by invoking Karniji's name and a lovadi covered arm that guided them to safety. At Deshnoke, Jhagadu Shah told his wish to construct temple. Karniji told him to construct temple at Porbandar as Harsiddhi temple. According to the Deshnoke registers, this event took place on Bhadwa Sudi 10, (Thursday) of Samvat 1516 (1459 AD).

== Temples of Karni Mata ==
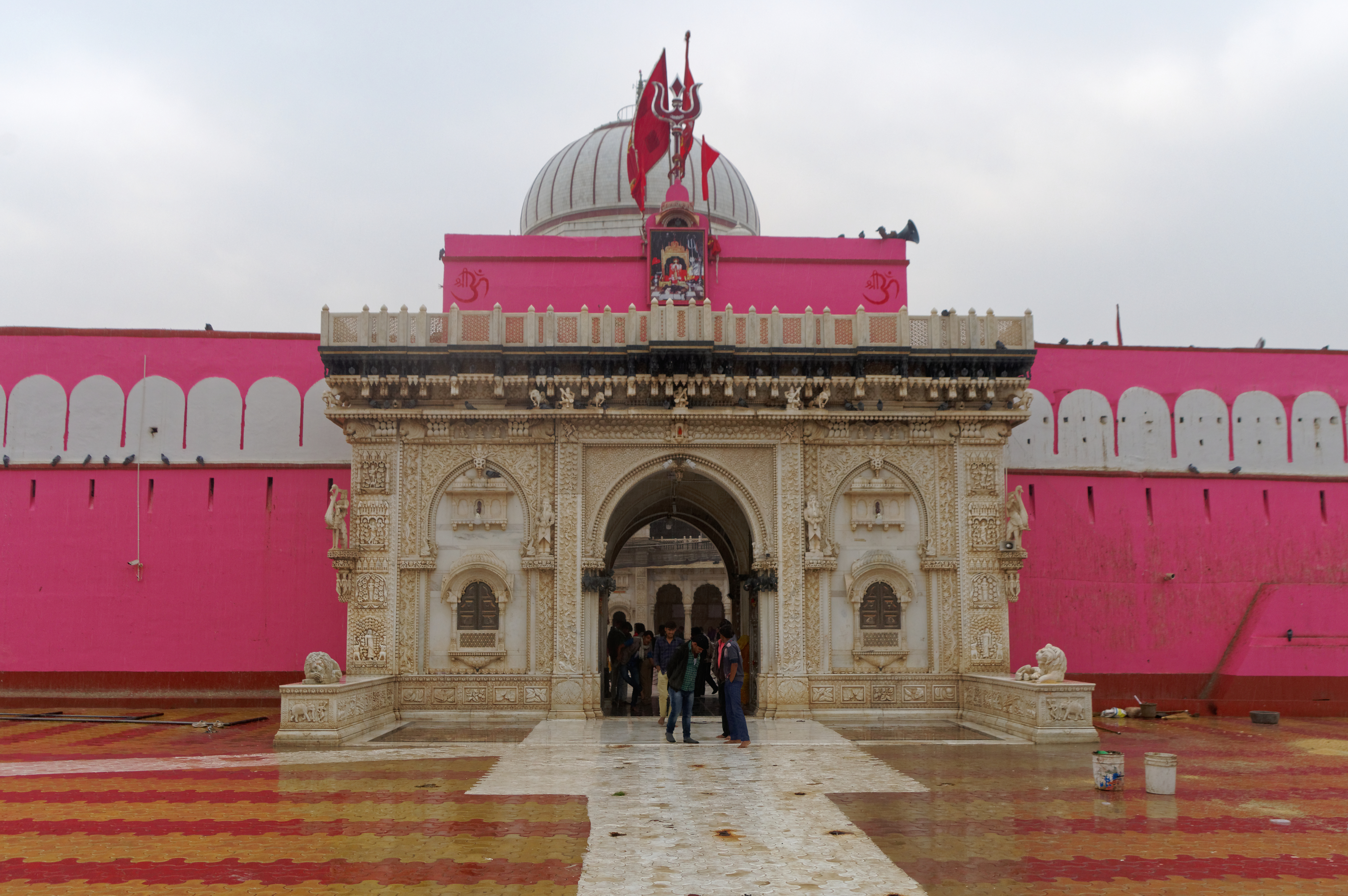
Sri Karni Mata Temple of Deshnoke

=== Sri Karni Mata Temple (Deshnoke) ===
The Deshnoke temple is the most important pilgrimage site for the devotees of Karni Mata. The temple is famous for the approximately 25,000 black rats and a few white rats (which are rarest to be seen) that live, and are revered, in the temple. These holy rats are considered to be reincarnated Cāraṇas devotees of previous birth, taking birth among humans and rat form alternately. Many people travel great distances to pay their respects. The temple draws visitors from across the country for blessings, as well as curious tourists from around the world.

The Gumbhara in which the idol (carved by a suthar named Banna Khati on yellow marble of Jaisalmer in three months) was installed in the presence of Karniji herself. It's an uncemented structure with the roof of Jal tree Salvadora oleoides. For the shelter of Kabas, no mortar has been used. After the victory over Kamran Mirza, the king Rao Jaitsi (fourth ruler of Bikaner) constructed a structure around the Gumbhara called 'The Mandh'. Later Maharaja Surat Singh changed it to Pucca structure. The gold door of the sanctum was presented by Maharaja Bakhtawar Singh of Alwar. In the 20th century, Maharaja Ganga Singh renovated a major part of the temple.

==== Temra Rai Temple ====
It is dedicated to goddess Avadji and located at the same place where Rao Kanha suffered for his obstinacy. The original Karand (basket used by Karniji to worship Avadji) and the idol of Avadji are still present there in the temple.

==== Sati Mankumariji Temple ====
The temple is a cenotaph containing the image of Mankumariji, Karniji's granddaughter, and her friend Sakhi. Mankumariji declared herself a Sati upon receiving news of her husband's death, and her friend Sakhi joined her.

=== Sri Nehriji Temple (Deshnoke) ===
Shri Nehriji is another temple at Deshnoke associated with Karniji when she lived at Deshnoke. The word Nehri means a dry wood which was revived to life to serve the requirement of churning curd.

When the migrants from Sathika first arrived at Johad in Janglu, they needed facilities for extracting ghee and churning curd from the cow milk. While pots and other required materials for the task had been brought, extraction of butter could not begin without a nehri (a Rajasthani name for one of the churning tools). Karniji asked one of the servants to fetch a piece of wood for the purpose who searched but what he did bring was not fit for making a proper nehri. Karniji thereupon planted the deadwood branch brought by the servant and sprinkled it with curd. The wood (a piece of dead Jal tree) took root and grew up as the only green Jal tree now to be seen in the Deshnoke Oran (protected village forest). A noteworthy feature of this tree is marks of sprinkled curds that have survived to this day.

=== Karni Mata Temple (Mathania) ===
This is the oldest temple of Shree Karni Mata built by her devotee, brother and follower, Amaraji Barhath of Mathania. After laying the foundation stone of the new capital of Jodhpur, Mehrangarh fort, Karniji on her return journey to Deshnoke stopped at Mathania on the request of its ruler Amaraji Barhath who had earlier came to Deshnoke as an emissary of Rao Jodha. Mathania was about 12 miles from Mandore. To commemorate the visit of the goddess, Amaraji raised a temple and dedicated it to her which became the first Shree Karni Mata Temple in history. With blessings from Maa Karniji, Amaraji had numerous progeny who came to be known as Amrawat.

The temple's inner sanctum consists of foot imprints of Shree Karni Mata which are worshipped. Everyday after sunrise, the goddess first blesses the people of Mathania and the Amrawats in particular with her presence, as the first 'jyot' is performed in the Madh of Mathania.

=== Harsiddhi Temple (Porbandar) ===
Once a devotee Jagadu or Jhagdu Shah, a 15th-century Gujarati trader was sailing and got stuck in a sea storm. He prayed to Maa Karni from his small boat, and she safely got him to Porbandar port. After reaching, Jhagadu Shah came to Maa Karni at Deshnoke for thanksgiving her kindness, and told his wish to construct temple. With Karni Mata's approval, he had the Harsiddhi temple built in Porbandar.

=== Karni Mata Temple (Mathura) ===
This temple was originally built by Lakhaji Barhath in the 16th century in Mathura. In the 20th century, it was reconstructed by Thakur Akshay Singh Ratnu.

=== Karni Mata Temple by Rana Sanga (Mewar) ===
A shrine dedicated to Karni Mata was built by the Chāraṇas in the village of Bheemal Charanan in the Mewar kingdom. The priestess of the temple, Viri Maa, was renowned in the region for her prophecies. When the crown princes of Mewar, Sanga, Jaimal, and Prithviraj, were in a tussle over their succession to the throne, their uncle Surajmal suggested visiting the venerated shrine of Karni Mata at Nahar Magra ("Tiger's Mount") to obtain an omen from Viri Maa. The dispute between Sanga and Prithviraj to become Maharana was decided in this shrine and the prediction that Rana Sanga would become the ruler of Mewar was made by Viri Maa.

However, this prediction did not sit well with crown prince Prithviraj who gravely injured Sanga causing him to lose vision in one eye. Ultimately, Rana Sanga defeated Prithviraj and became the ruler of Mewar and constructed a temple dedicated to Karni Mata at this shrine.

=== Manshapurna Karni Mata Temple (Udaipur) ===
Another temple dedicated to Karni Mata is Shri Manshapurna Karni Mata Temple or Karni Mata, Udaipur, located on the Machla Hills, near Pandit Deendayal Upadhyay Park in Udaipur, Rajasthan. Between the years 1620 and 1628, Maharana Karan Singh developed a residential area at Machla Magra for Udaipur's safety. The temple was built by Maharana Karan Singh as to mark the boundary and safety of Udaipur. The temple was deserted for a long time, and in 1997 the Shri Manshapurna Karni Mata Development Committee rebuilt it.

=== Karni Mata Temple (Alwar) ===
Another temple dedicated to Karni Mata is located in the historical city of Alwar, Rajasthan. It is situated in the heart of city, near the Sagar Palace and Bala Qila.

This temple was built by the second ruler of the Alwar State, Maharao Raja Sawai Bakhtawar Singh (1791–1815). Since then, the royal family of Alwar has been worshipping Karni Mata for whom two temples were built in Bala Qila and Rajbhawan.

=== Shree Madh Khurad Dham (Nagaur) ===
Another historical temple dedicated to Maa Karni is located at Khurad, 12 km northeast from Gachhipura in the district of Nagaur, Rajasthan. The original temple was built by the Cāraṇas of village Khurd. Inder Baisa, a 20th-century figure, was seen as an incarnation of the goddess Karni by her followers. The Bikaner ruler Maharaja Ganga Singh was also among her devotees and on her advice sanctioned Rs. 11,157 on 8 September 1930 from his privy purse for carrying out the original works and repairs of the temple of Goddess Karni. Ganga Singh entrusted this work to his trusted minister Hari Singh of Sattasar. It was built as a fort. Lying close to the marble city Makrana, it is built mainly of white marble.
