= Surpura railway station =

Railway station in Rajasthan, India

Surpura

General information
- Location: Surpura, Nokha Tehsil, Bikaner district, Rajasthan; India
- Coordinates: 27.706677°N 73.442249°E
- Elevation: 286 metres (938 ft)
- System: Indian Railways station
- Owner: Indian Railways
- Operator: North Western Railway
- Line: Jodhpur–Bathinda line
- Platforms: 1
- Tracks: Single Electric-Line

Construction
- Structure type: Standard (on-ground station)

Other information
- Status: Functioning
- Station code: SPO
- Zone(s): North Western Railway
- Division(s): Jodhpur

Services
Preceding station	Indian Railways	Following station
Nokha towards ?	North Western Railway zone Jodhpur–Bathinda line	Deshnoke towards ?
Location
- Interactive map

Surpura railway station is a railway station located on the Jodhpur–Bathinda railway line operated by the North Western Railway zone under Jodhpur railway division. It is situated at Surpura, Nokha Tehsil in Bikaner district in the Indian state of Rajasthan.
