= Sahwa, Rajasthan =

Sahawa Sahawa Sahib
- village
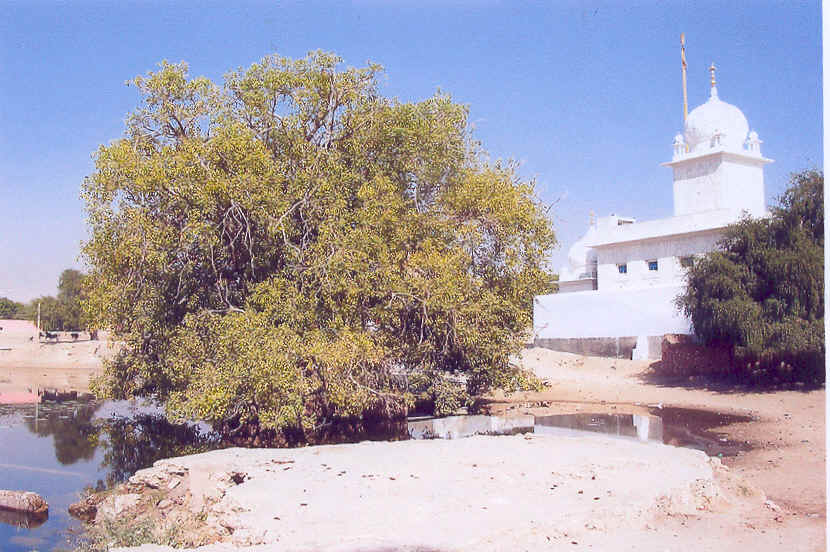
- Sahawa's Gurudwara

- Location in Rajasthan, India Sahawa (India)
- Coordinates: 28°52′23″N 74°50′48″E
- Country: India
- State: Rajasthan
- District: Churu

Languages
  - Local: Major Bagri, Haryanvi Minor Punjabi
- Time zone: UTC+5:30 (IST)
- Postal code: 331302
- ISO 3166 code: RJ-IN
- Vehicle registration: RJ-10
- Climate: Arid (Köppen)

Sahawa (or Sahwa) is a village in the Taranagar sub-district of the Churu district in the Indian state of Rajasthan. Situated on the border of Churu and Hanumangarh districts, Sahawa is the largest village in Churu. The area is known for its historic Gurudwara and serves as a hub for parali (crop residue) transport. Nearby villages and towns include Kanau, Kunji, Khopra, Dheerwas Bara, and Baniyala.

== Transportation ==
The nearest railheads are at Nohar and Bhadra, while the closest airport is in Hisar. Sahawa is connected via National Highway 703 (NH 703) and state highways to Sirsa, Hanumangarh, and Churu.

== Water supply ==
Sahawa houses a water treatment plant that is part of the Aapni Yojana integrated water supply project, which serves northwestern Rajasthan. The plant supplies drinking water to nearby towns and cities, including Taranagar and Bhanin, and stands as one of the largest water filtration facilities in Rajasthan.
