= Rao Bika =

Rao of Bikaner from 1465 to 1504

- Rao
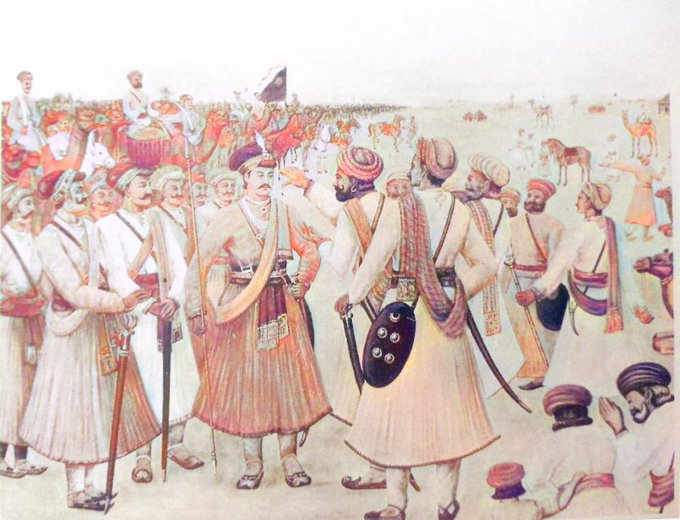
- Defeated Chiefs accepting Rao Bikaji as their new king

Rao of Bikaner
- Reign: 30 September 1465 – 17 June 1504
- Predecessor: Position established
- Successor: Rao Naro
- Born: 5 August 1438; Marwar
- Died: 17 June 1504 (aged 65)
- Spouse: Devadiji (Chauhanji) Udai Deiji of Sirohi; Bhatiyaniji Rang Deiji of Pugal
- Issue: Gadshi; Naro; Lunkaran
- Dynasty: Rathore
- Father: Rao Jodha
- Mother: Sankhaliji (Parmarji) Navrang Deiji of Roon, Marwar

Rao Bika (5 August 1438 – 17 June 1504) was a scion of the Rathore clan of Rajputs and the founder of the city of Bikaner and Bikaner State in present-day state of Rajasthan in India. He was the fifth son of Rao Jodha, founder of the city of Jodhpur. During his reign he controlled an area of 40,000 square miles, which included 3,000 villages. He is the ancestor of the Bika Rathore Clan within the Rathore Dynasty and the founder of Bikawat Rathore House and the Royal House of Bikaner.

== Establishment of Bikaner ==
In 1465 AD, Rao Bika had come late and taken seat beside his uncle, Rawat Kandhal, with whom he carried a conversation in whisper. Rao Jodha jestingly remarked that they must be making a plan of conquest of new territory, an idea constantly being suggested to him to provide for his large family. Rao Bika and Rawat Kandhal took the observation as a challenge and pledged to win new lands. The land approved by Rao Jodha to conquer through conquest was Jangladesh which had been largely weakened by war as suggested by Napo, a Sankhala Rajput.

On 30 September 1465, the 27-year-old Rao Bika, leading 100 horsemen and 500 foot-soldiers, left Jodhpur to conquer Jangladesh. He was accompanied by his uncle Rawat Kandhal (who had sworn to establish his nephew just like he did Rao Jodha in Marwar) and his uncles Rupo, Mandan, Mandalo and Nathu; his brothers Bida, Jogayat; his dhai brother chahad gahlot along with gora bherav ji of mandore and others. Jangladesh was then inhabited by the Bhatis, Jats, Bhattis and Johiyas. Bika led an army of around 300 of his clansmen to conquer the Jangladesh area. Bika also had the support of Karni Mata, Charans and Godara Jats.

Rao Bika founded Bikaner state and conquered the areas of Sirsa, Ladnu, Bhatner, Bhatinda, Singhana, Rini, Nohar and Pugal. During his reign, he controlled an area of 40,000 square miles, which included 3,000 villages.

After Rao Bika's death, his elder son Rao Nara became the new ruler of Bikaner, however he died within a year of his reign. Nara was succeeded by his younger brother Rao Lunkaran in 1505.

== See also ==
- History of Bikaner
