= Deshnoke =

Town in Rajasthan famous for the Karni Mata Temple

- Metropolitan
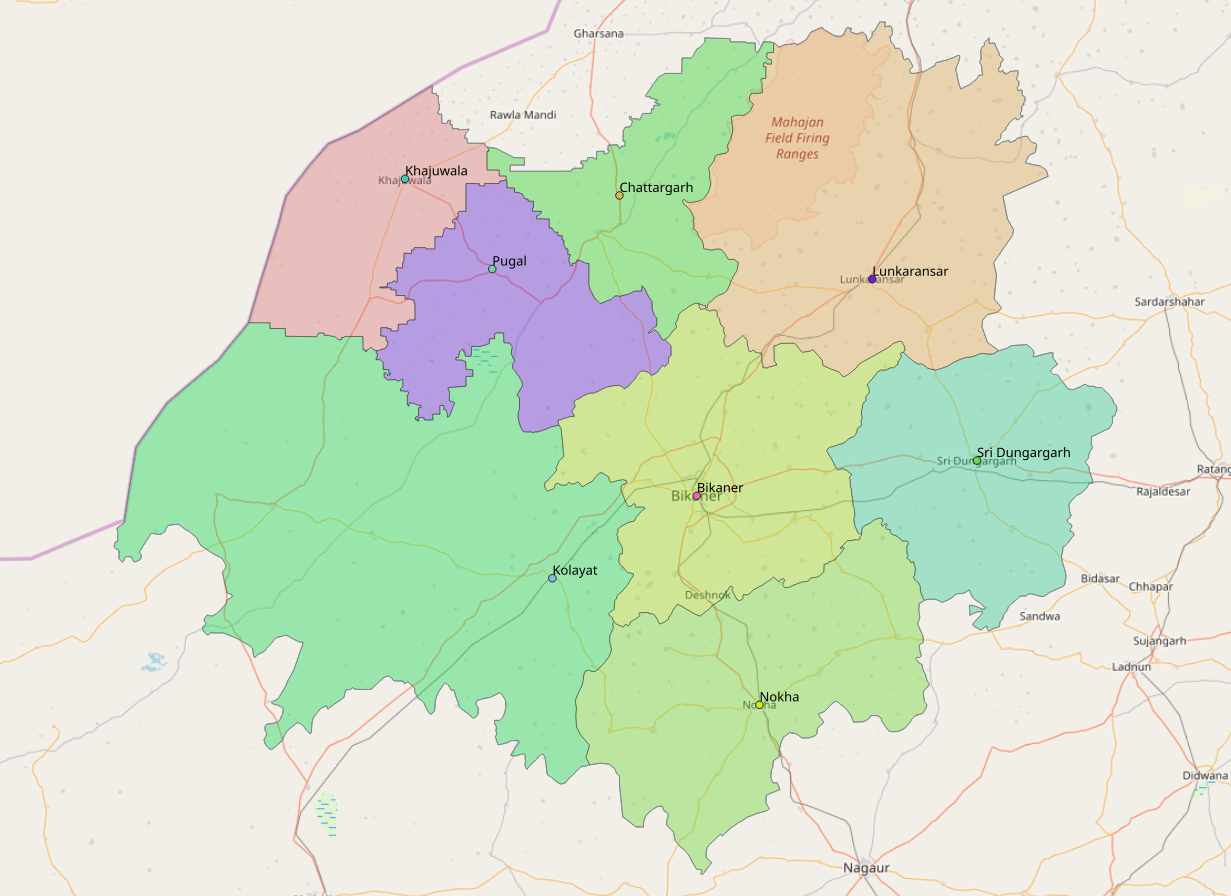
- Location within Bikaner District Location within Rajasthan Location within India
- Coordinates: 27.791°N 73.341°E
- Country: India
- State: Rajasthan
- District: Bikaner
- Founder: Karni Mata

Government
  - Type: Municipal council
  - Body: Chairman CA Om Prakash Mundhra

Area
  - Total: 28 km^{2} (11 sq mi)
- Elevation: 265 m (869 ft)

Population (2011)
  - Total: 15,791
  - Density: 560/km^{2} (1,500/sq mi)

Languages
  - Official: Hindi; Marwari
- Time zone: UTC+5:30 (IST)
- Vehicle registration: RJ-07andRJ-50

Deshnoke is a town in the Bikaner district of Rajasthan, India. The town is famous for the Karni Mata Temple and was established by Goddess Karni-ji herself who led her followers to this region.

== History ==
The village was established on Vaisakh Sudi 2nd of Samvat 1476 (1419 CE) by Bhagwati Karniji Maharaj. Rao Ranmal, the Rathore ruler of Marwar and a follower of Karniji suggested the initial name Deshoat meaning "Shield of the land" hoping that true to this name it would protect his kingdom. However, Karniji stated that kingdoms will belong to their rulers so long as they depend on their own might and fight for moral values. Therefore, she named the village as Deshnak (Nose of the Land), to be as important to the Marwar kingdom of Rathores as a nose is to an honorable man.

In course of time, the village Deshnak came to be known as Deshnoke.

== Geography ==
Deshnoke is located at 27°47′26″N 73°20′27″E. It has an average elevation of 265 metres (869 ft). It is served by Deshnoke Railway station.

== Demographics ==
As of the 2001 Indian census, Deshnoke had a population of 15,791. Males constitute 51% of the population and females 49%. Deshnoke has an average literacy rate of 51%, lower than the national average of 59.5%: male literacy is 60% and, female literacy is 41%. In Deshnoke, 19% of the population is under 6 years of age.

== Karni Mata Temple ==
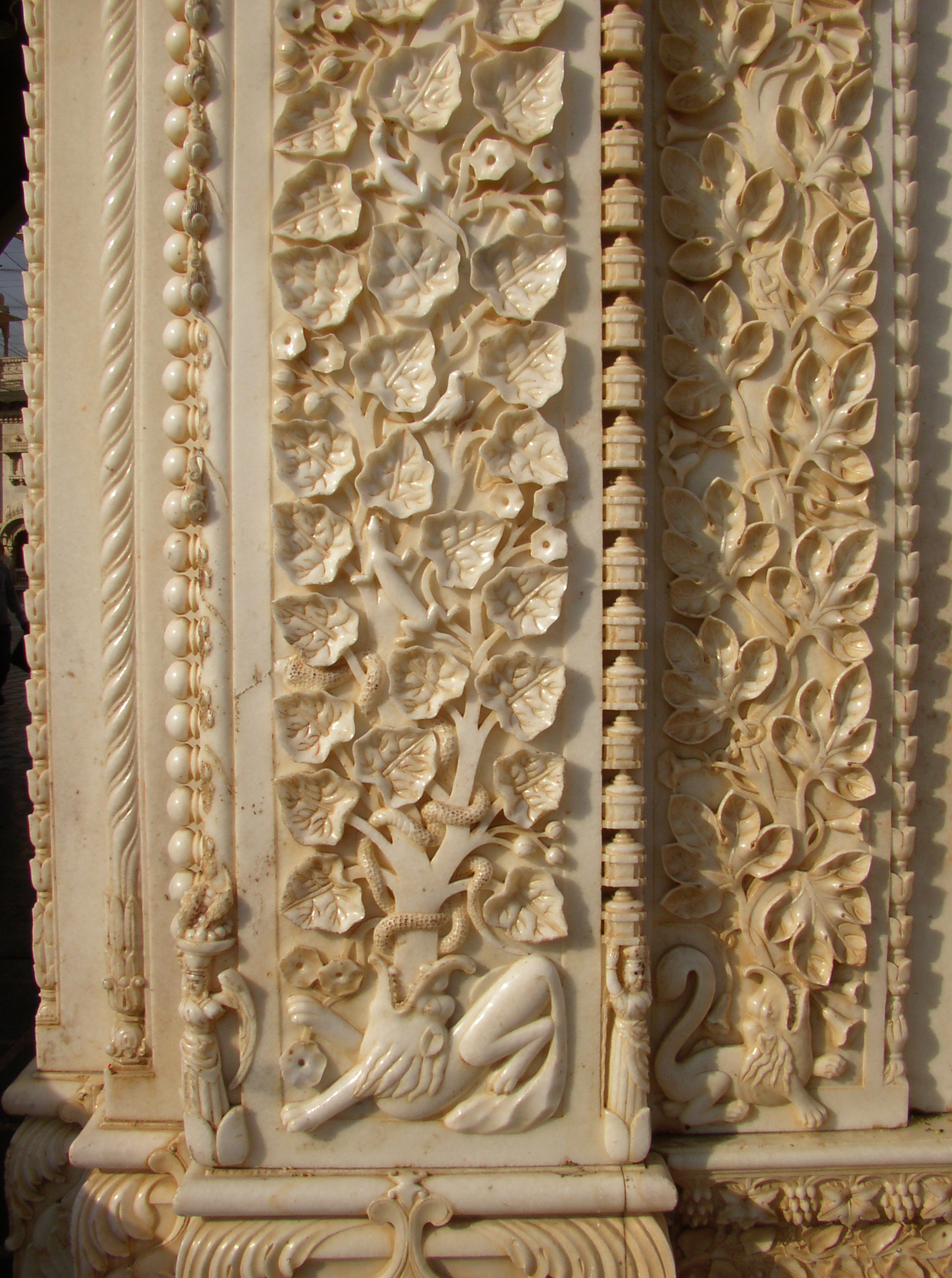
Karni Mata Temple

Located near the Pakistan border, the Karni Mata Temple is a popular tourist destination in the Bikaner region.

Karni Mata also has followers from outside of the state. During Navratri, thousands of devotees visit the temple mainly from Rajasthan, Gujarat, and also from Haryana and Madhya Pradesh.

Biography of Karni Mata - According to tradition, Karni Ji was born in the Kiniya lineage of Charans. Many miracles were associated with her beginning from her childhood. Her parents arranged her marriage with Depaji Bithu of Sathika. However, after her marriage, she later expressed to her husband her unwillingness to engage in matrimonial relations. Respecting her wishes and on her advice, Depaji married Karni-ji's younger sister for the continuation of his line. She herself remained celibate all her life, with the concurrence and support of her husband.

Karni lived in Sathika village for about two years before leaving with her followers and a large herd of cattle. When she reached near Deshnoke, Rao Kanha himself came to oppose her camping but he died. Karni Mata declared her follower Rao Ridmal of Chandasar as the new ruler of the region and continued on her journey.

In 1453, she gave her blessing to Rao Jodha of Jodhpur for conquering Ajmer, Merta and Mandor. In 1457 she went to Jodhpur at Rao Jodha's request, to lay the cornerstone of the fort at Jodhpur.

Her first temple was constructed in the village of Mathania during her lifetime by her follower Amar Ji Charan. In 1472, she arranged the marriage of Rao Bika (the fifth son of Rao Jodha) and Rang Kunwar (daughter of Rao Shekha of Pungal) to turn the enmity between Rathore and Bhati Rajputs into friendship. In 1485, she laid the foundation stone of the fort of Bikaner at the request of Rao Bika. In 1538, Karniji went to visit the Maharaja of Jaisalmer. On 21 March of that year she was travelling back to Deshnoke with her stepson Punyaraj and a few other followers. They were near Diyatra of Bikaner district where she asked the caravan to stop for water. She disappeared there, reportedly at the age of 151 years.
