= Dheerwas Bara =

- village
- Nickname: Dheer
- Location within Rajasthan
- Coordinates: 28.84426°N 74.915986°E
- Country: India
- State: Rajasthan
- District: Churu district

Government
  - Sarpanch: Dharmaram
- Elevation: 431 m (1,414 ft)

Population (2011)
  - Total: 6,867

Languages
  - Official: Bagri
- Time zone: UTC+5:30 (IST)
- PIN: 331302
- Telephone code: 911561
- ISO 3166 code: RJ-IN
- Vehicle registration: RJ-10

Dheerwas Bara is a village in Taranagar Tehsil in Churu district in Rajasthan, India. As of 2011, it had a population of 6,867.

3,571 are employed, with about 54.5% describing their job as main work and the other 45.5% describing their work as marginal or temporary. 1,420 of the main work were cultivators, meaning they were owners or co-owners of a farm, and 198 were simply agricultural laborers.
