= Deshnoke railway station =

Railway station in Rajasthan, India

Deshnoke

General information
- Location: Deshnoke, Bikaner district, Rajasthan; India
- Coordinates: 27.790293°N 73.338817°E
- Elevation: 275 metres (902 ft)
- System: Indian Railways station
- Owner: Indian Railways
- Operator: North Western Railway
- Line: Merta Road–Bikaner line
- Platforms: 2
- Tracks: 2

Construction
- Structure type: Standard (on ground station)
- Parking: Yes

Other information
- Status: Functioning
- Station code: DSO
- Zone(s): North Western Railway
- Division(s): Jodhpur
Location
- Location within India Location within Rajasthan

Deshnoke railway station is a railway station in Bikaner district, Rajasthan. Its code is DSO. It serves Deshnoke town. The station consists of 2 platforms. Passenger, Express and Superfast trains halt here.
