= Suwap, Jodhpur =

Village in Rajasthan, India

Suwapis a village and gram panchayat in the Phalodi Tehsil of the Jodhpur District, Rajasthan, India, known as a historic settlement granted to Charan families by Mehaji Mangaliya. It's a medium-sized village with around 234 families, part of the Aau Block, offering insights into rural Rajasthani life and its historical connections, especially to the Charan community.
