= Jangladesh =

Historical region in northern Rajasthan

- Historical region
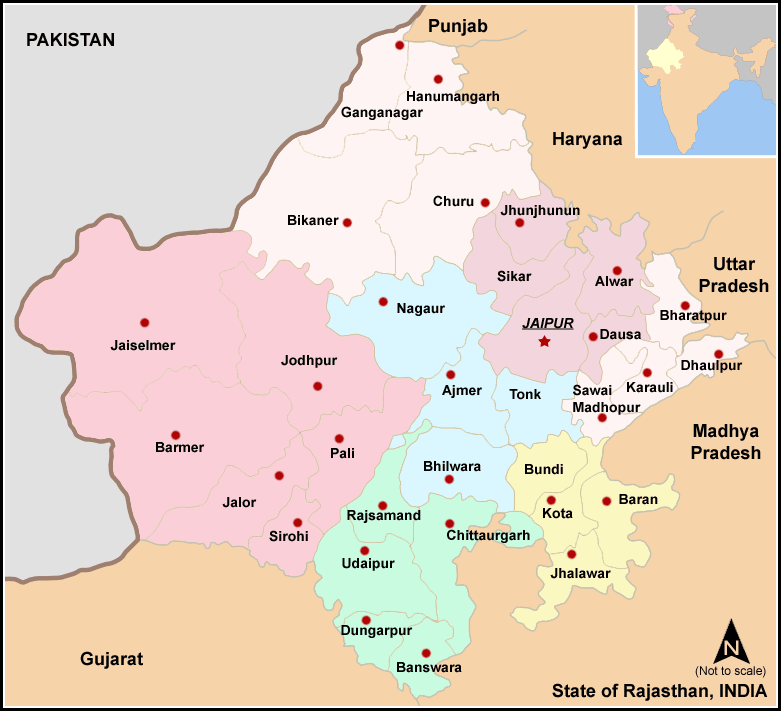
- The districts of Rajasthan. The northern-most light pink coloured region is roughly equivalent to Jangladesh, comprising the modern districts of Bikaner, Churu, Ganganagar, and Hanumangarh.
- Country: India

Jangladesh, also known as Jangaldesh or Janglu, was a historical region in what is now northern Rajasthan. It included the present-day districts of Bikaner, Churu, Ganganagar, Hanumangarh, and parts of Sirsa. It was bounded on the south by Marwar and Jaisalmer, and on the east by Ajmer-Merwara.

The term Jangladesh means "rough and dry country", and it is first mentioned in the Mahabharata, although it does not mention an exact location. Later Sanskrit texts, such as Bhava Prakasha and Shabdakalpadruma Kosha, suggested that the land was a hot, arid region, where trees grow with little water.

== History ==
The core territory of the Chahamanas of Shakambhari (551-1192 CE) was in this region, and it was known as both Sapadalaksha and Jangala-desha.

Between the 10th and 12th centuries, the political landscape had changed. Much of the northern and western regions were ruled by the Bhati Rajputs. Around Bhatner, there were many settlements of Muslim Bhattis and Johiyas. The remaining regions were controlled by Jats, who were ruled by their own chiefs and largely governed by their own customs.

In the 15th century, Rao Bika, emboldened by the prophecies of Karni Mata, successfully led a coalition of Rathores, Charans, and Godara Jats, and captured the region. As a result, most Jat chieftains had to accept the suzerainty of the Bikaner State. Bika also saved the Jats from the predations of the Bhatis, acting as their buffer. The region was subsequently renamed to Bikaner, and would later be incorporated into the Rajputana Agency.

== States ==
=== Sidhmukh State ===
The Sidhmukh State (1068 - 17th century) was established by the Hindu Jat adventurer Rao Kasupal Kaswan of Mandore. In 1068 AD, Kasupal attacked the Mohil Rajput principality of Chhapar with 5,000 soldiers, and then marched on Sidhmukh, establishing his rule after defeating Ranjit Singh Johiya. Thus, he established Kaswan Jat rule over Sidhmukh and its environs. Kasupal then moved towards Satyu and killed 7 Chauhan chiefs, capturing their territories.

== See also ==
- Bagar (region)
- Bikaner State
- History of Rajasthan
- History of Haryana
- Shekhawati
