= Mohil =

Mohil, Mial, Moyal or Mohal is a clan of the Chauhan Rajputs.

According to local tradition, the ruler of Ladaun region, Rao Jai Singh, was once watching a group of women passing through the town gate to fetch water. A menacing bull blocked the road. One of the women, who was a Muslim, took the bull in hand and pushed it out of the way. The Rao was greatly impressed by the woman's show of courage and valour. Thinking that the offspring of such a brave woman would be as brave, the Raja formally proposed marriage with her to her father. The girl gave her consent on the condition that the Raja should become a Muslim. However, no information of this was mentioned in the Rajasthani khyat, as the history of the Mohils remains unknown and untraced.
