= Johiya =

Social group of South Asia

- Joiya
- Jāti: Rajput, Jat
- Religions: Predominantly Islam
- Languages: Rajasthani, Punjabi
- Country: Pakistan India
- Region: Punjab, Rajasthan
- Ethnicity: Rajasthani, Punjabi

The Johiyas (or Joiyas) are a tribe native to Punjab and Rajasthan. They are often classified as both Rajputs and Jats.

== History ==
Alexander Cunningham derived the term "Johiya" from "Yaudheya", and theorized that the modern Johiyas were representatives of the ancient Yaudheyas. A.B.L. Awasthi, however, connected modern Rajputs to Yaudheyas instead; historian R. C. Majumdar finds Awasthi's identification more probable. Yet another theory connects the Admera sub-group of the Johiyas to the ancient Audumbaras.

Between the 8th and 12th centuries, the Johiyas were among the dominant communities of northern Rajasthan (historically known as Jangladesh), along with other Rajput and Jat clans. They were especially powerful in the Bikaner area. By the 13th century, the Johiyas had begun converting to Islam under the influence of the famous Sufi preacher Baba Farid, with the 17th century Jawahir-i-Faridi listing the Johiyas as one of the Jat clans converted by him.

During the 17th century, Muslim Johiya chieftains routinely fought with the Bhattis, who were also vassals of Bikaner, over the territories of Sirsa, Fatehabad, Rania and Hisar, often shifting their allegiance between the two sides.

According to the Tarikh-i-Sher Shahi, a prominent Johiya warlord, Fateh Khan Jat, had taken advantage of the chaos caused by the sudden rise of the Surs, plundering the main roads up to Panipat and briefly capturing Multan from the Baloch.

In the later half of the 18th century, the Sotar valley was held by Muslim tribes claiming a Rajput origin, chief among them being the Johiyas and Bhattis. In 1768, the Johiya chief Kamruddin was commissioned by Maharaja Gaj Singh of Bikaner to retake Rania, Fatehabad and Sirsa from the Bhattis. In 1774, Amar Singh of Patiala had captured those territories from the Bhattis. in 1781, after a series of conflicts, a treaty was signed at Jind, wherein Tosham, Hisar, Hansi, Meham and Rohtak would be restored to the Mughals, Fatehbad and Sirsa would be restored to the Bhattis under Bikaner state, and the Jat Sikhs would keep the rest of the territories they annexed. Raja Jai Singh was then appointed as the Nazim of Hisar Sarkar.

== See also ==
- Jat Muslim
- Muslim Rajputs
- Rajputisation
