= Mewar–Malwa conflicts =

Conflict in the Indian subcontinent

- Kingdom of Mewar and the Malwa and Gujarat Saltanates at their peak
Location	Rajasthan; Madhya Pradesh
Result	Rajputs Mewar victory
Territorial changes	Hadoti, Gagron Fort, Sarangpur, Raisen, Chanderi, Bhilsa, Kalpi, and Ranthambore captured by Mewar

Belligerents
Kingdom of Mewar	Malwa Sultanate

Commanders and leaders
Kshetra Singh; Rana Kumbha; Ranmal; Rana Raimal; Prithviraj Sisodia; Rana Sanga; Medini Rai; Silhadi; Ratan Singh; Chananji Khidiya; Ajja Jhala; Gajadhar Singh †	Hoshang Shah; Mahmud Khalji; Ghiyas-ud-Din Shah; Zafar Khan; Nasir-ud-Din Shah; Muzaffar Shah II; Ashaf Khan; Shihab-ud-Din Mahmud Shah II

The Mewar–Malwa conflicts were a series of battles between the Kingdom of Mewar and the Sultanate of Malwa which erupted due to territorial expansion by both sides. The conflicts were fought in present-day Rajasthan and Madhya Pradesh. The Rana branch of the Guhilas, after their recovery of the Rajput stronghold of Chittorgarh and the region of Mewar (with Rajputana) following the Battle of Singoli, began an ambitious expansion at the cost of their neighbouring kingdoms. The Delhi Sultanate weakened with the invasion of Timur, and many of its provinces gained independence; this included Malwa, adjacent to Mewar.

The conflict began during the reigns of Rana Kshetra and Dilawar Khan Ghori in Bakrole, and was continued by Rana Kumbha and Sultan Mahmud Khalji in the Battle of Sarangpur, the siege of Gagron, and the Battle of Mandalgarh and Banas. The next rulers of Mewar and Malwa, Rana Raimal and Ghiyas-ud-Din Shah, fought the Battle of Mandalgarh. The last battles between the states were the Battle of Gagron and the Siege of Mandsaur, during the reign of Rana Sanga and Shihab-ud-Din Mahmud Shah II.

== Background ==
=== Mewar ===
The Kingdom of Mewar rose to prominence between the 14th and 16th centuries after the Battle of Singoli and took Mahmud (possibly Sultan Mohommad Bin Tuqlaq) prisoner, capturing Idar and claiming sovereignty of Badnore, Bakrole, Ajmer, Mandalgarh, Jahazpur, Hadoti, and Chappan. The kingdom hoped to expand its territory to neighbouring regions.

=== Malwa ===
After the 1305 fall of the Parmara kingdom to the Delhi Sultanate, Malwa was annexed and controlled by Delhi until the invasion of the Mongol conqueror Timur. After Timur's invasion, Malwa governor Dilawar Khan declared Malwa independent of the Delhi Sultanate and established its capital at Dhar. Malwa remained independent until 1562, when it was conquered by the Mughal Empire.

== Conflict ==
The first battle between the Kingdom of Mewar and Malwa Sultanate was during the reign of Rana Kshetra, son and successor of Rana Hammir, who (after consolidating power in Mewar) began to take key points in eastern Rajasthan. He captured Ajmer, Jahazpur, and re-annexed Mandalgarh, Mandsaur, and Chappan. At that time, Dilawar Khan Ghori (the first sultan of Malwa) attacked him at Bakrole. The battle ended with Dilawar's victory and the retreat of the Malwa army. The conflict was continued by Rana Kumbha in 1437 at Sarangpur, where he defeated the Malwa army and took Sultan Mahmud Khalji prisoner for six months. He also captured Sarangpur and other Malwa territories. Mahmud was later freed, since Kumbha was unwilling to antagonise neighbouring sultanates with the sultan's captivity.

Mahmud fought with Kumbha again at Mandalgarh and Banas between 1443 and 1446; both battles were indecisive. The Kingdom of Mewar experienced setbacks as Sultan Mahmud Khilji raided as far inland as Ajmer and established his governor there; it also fought the sultans of Gujarat and Nagore and contended with the Rathors of Marwar. Rana Kumbha repulsed the setbacks, reconquered Ajmer, and held onto most of his conquests. Only the border area of Ranthambore, in the rugged region of Hadoti, eluded his grasp. Rana Kumbha was assassinated by his oldest son, Uday Singh I, in 1468; this began a period of political instability in Mewar. Taking advantage of this vacuum, the next sultan of Malwa (Ghiyas-ud-Din Shah) captured Ajmer and Sheopur. He supported Surajmal (the son of Udai Singh I) as Rana of Mewar; Uday was struck by lightning and another son of Kumbha, Raimal, was crowned king. At this time, Malwa had the upper hand against Mewar. The sultan's ambitions were thwarted when he experienced setbacks during the Battle of Mandalgarh in 1473, resulting in the loss of Sheopur Ajmer was later conquered by Kunwar Prithviraja, a son of Raimal.

The conflict entered its last phase when Rana Sanga ascended the throne of Mewar in 1508 and supported Medani Rai, a rebellious feudal lord who was serving the sultan of Malwa Shihab-ud-Din Mahmud Shah II. During his first invasion of Malwa, Sanga was driven out by the combined armies of Malwa and Gujarat. In an attempt to make Sanga pay for his previous invasion, the sultan of Malwa attacked Gagron. This led to the 1519 Battle of Gagron, which resulted in the sultan's capture and the near-total loss of his Malwa territory.

== Aftermath ==
After Rana Sanga's victory in the Battle of Gagraun, restoring Hindu rule in Malwa, Sanga ordered Medini Rai to remove the Jizya tax from the region's Hindus. Another Rajput chief, Silhaditya Tomar, established himself as master of the Raisen and Sarangpur regions. According to historian Satish Chandra, these events took place between 1518 and 1519.

== List of conflicts ==
Battle (year)	Maharana	Sultan	Result
Battle of Sarangpur (1437)	Maharana Kumbha	Mahmud Khalji	Mewar victory; Sarangpur, Hadoti and Gagron captured, and Sultan Mahmud taken prisoner for six months
Battle of Mandalgarh (1443)	Maharana Kumbha	Mahmud Khalji	Mewar victory
Siege of Gagron (1444)	Palan Singh and Dahir Singh	Mahmud Khalji	Malwa victory; Gagron reaptured
Battle of Banas (1446)	Maharana Kumbha	Mahmud Khalji	Mewar victory; Khalji retreat
Siege of Mandasaur (1447)	Maharana Kumbha	Mahmud Khalji	Mewar victory; Mandasur defended
Conquest of Ajmer	Gajadhar Singh †	Mahmud Khalji	Malwa victory
Conquest of Mandalgarh	Uparamal †	Mahmud Khalji	Malwa victory
Battle of Kumbhalgarh (1459)	Maharana Kumbha	Ghiyath Shah	Mewar victory
Siege of Chittor (1473)	Maharana Raimal	Mahmud Khalji	Mewar victory
Battle of Mandalgarh (1473)	Maharana Raimal	Mahmud Khalji	Mewar victory; Kherabad captured
Nasir-ud-Din invasion of Chittor	Maharana Raimal	Nasir-ud-Din Shah	Malwa victory
Battle of Gagron (1519)	Maharana Sanga	Shihab-ud-Din Mahmud Shah II	Mewar victory; Raisen, Chanderi, Bhilsa, Kalpi and Ranthambore captured
Siege of Mandsaur (1520)	Maharana Sanga	Shihab-ud-Din Mahmud Shah II	Inconclusive
