= Conquest of Mandalgarh =

Conquest of Mandalgarh by the Malwa Sultanate

- Part of Mewar-Malwa Conflict
Date	mid-October – 20 October 1457
Location	Mandalgarh 25.2°N 75.1°E
Result	Malwa Sultanate victory
Territorial changes	Mandalgarh added to territory of Malwa Sultanate.

Belligerents
Malwa Sultanate	Mewar Kingdom

Commanders and leaders
Mahmud Khalji	Uparamal †
- Location within Rajasthan Conquest of Mandalgarh (India) Conquest of Mandalgarh (South Asia)

The conquest of Mandalgarh was a military expedition led by Sultan Mahmud Khalji of Malwa against Mewar, in what is now India. The primary objective of this campaign was to capture the Mandalgarh fort, which was under the command of Uparamal, a subordinate of Rana Kumbha. Khalji marched towards Mewar in the year 1457 to achieve this goal, personally surveyed the hillocks surrounding the fort, and selected the western hillock as his base of operations. Mandalgarh fort, located in the city of Mandalgarh, is situated in the Bhilwara District of Rajasthan, India.

Khalji was able to capture the fort after a few days of siege, when Kumbha was busy fighting the Sultan of Gujarat and could not reinforce the fort. However, Kumbha recaptured the fort within a few days.

== Preliminaries ==
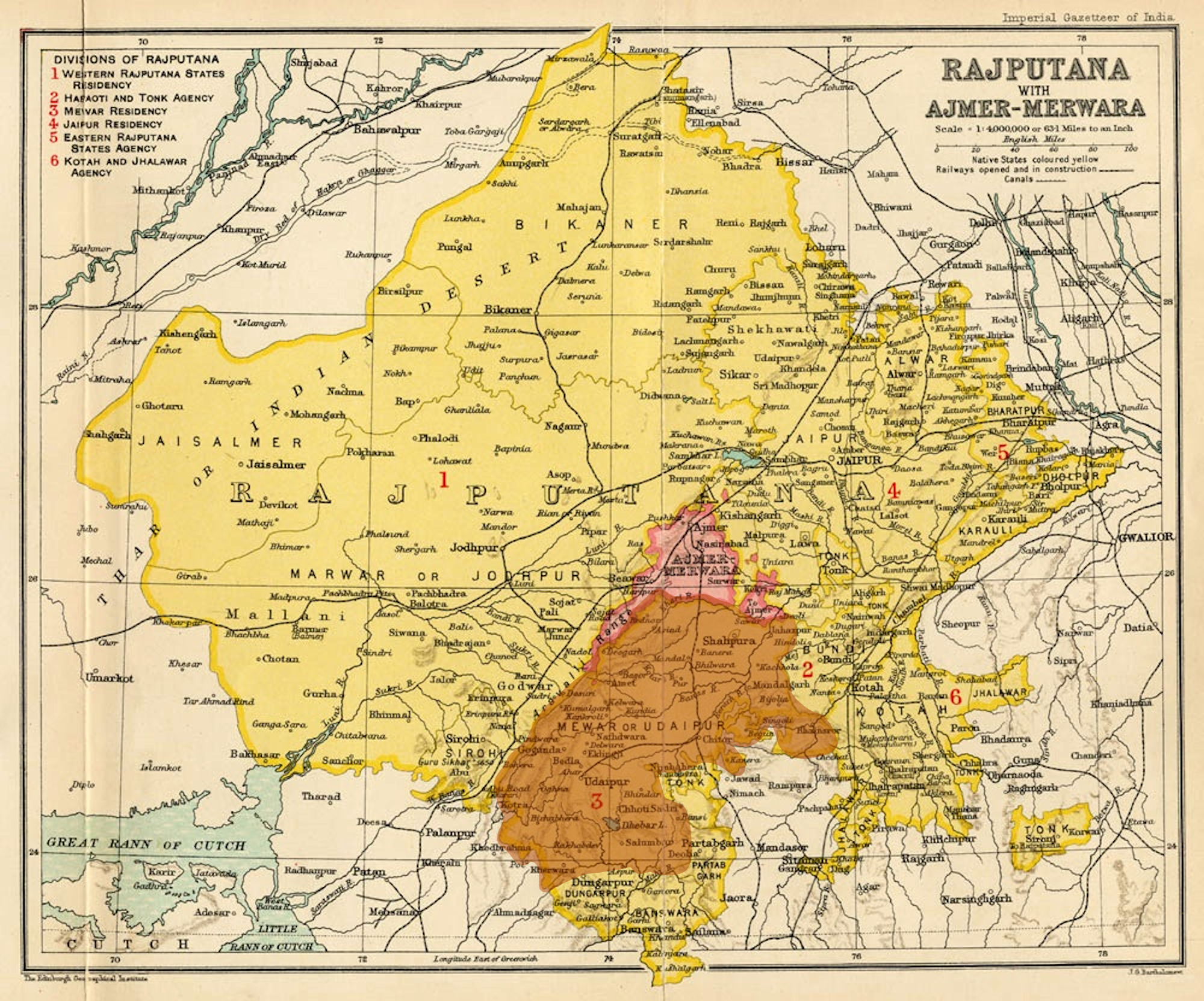
Map of Mewar Including Mandalgarh

In 1457, this territory was under the control of Kumbha. The conflict over the succession in Nagaur between Shams Khan, son of Firuz Khan, and Mujahid Khan, brother of Firuz Khan, had drawn Kumbha into the dispute. The Hadas of Bundi, who had Mandalgarh taken from them by Kumbha and had accepted the suzerainty of Khalji, harbored strong animosity towards Kumbha.

Upon reaching the proximity of the Mewar territory, Khalji's armies were joined by forces from other regions of his kingdom. It appears that he marched through the lands belonging to Mewar, issuing orders to his army to destroy anything in their path, including cultivated fields and temples. These orders were given as a means of showcasing the Mewar ruler's inability to protect the lives, property, and religion of those affected by Khalji's campaigns. Having acquired knowledge from previous assaults, he was aware of the formidable nature of the fort, which was situated atop a hill amidst rugged terrain and dense vegetation.

Setting up his camp at a distance from the fort, Khalji personally surveyed the area, identifying a high hill on the western side that provided a strategic advantage for a potential attack. Despite the challenges posed by the rough terrain and dense jungle covering the hill, he initiated the clearance of foliage and excavation of rocks to create a passage to the hilltop. Skirmishes occurred during the road preparation, prompting him to deploy soldiers to engage the Rajputs while ensuring the passage construction remained undisturbed.

After successfully establishing his camp at the hilltop, he commenced the siege by encircling the fort from all directions, blocking off any potential entry points. Manjaniks and Maghribis were strategically positioned to facilitate the assault, with the utilization of a manjanik-i-rakabi for targeting and damaging the fortification walls. The Rajputs within the fort also employed manjaniks to repel the attackers and inflict heavy casualties on those near the walls.

== Capture ==
In 1456–57, Sultan Mahmud Khalji once again besieged Mandalgarh fort. Although he was able to capture the lower fort, the hill fort proved to be more difficult. After the capture of the town, Khalji destroyed all the temples in the area and had mosques built in their place. He appointed mullas to perform the daily worship in these mosques. He then returned to Mandu via Chittor, sending his sons on missions to ravage the country of the Bhils and Kolis.

As the siege persisted, an unexpected turn of events occurred when stones hurled by the manjanik from outside inadvertently damaged the most effective manjaniks within the fort of Mandalgarh, rendering them unfit for use. This development brought great satisfaction to the besiegers, yet the defending forces remained resolute in their efforts to protect the fort. Any damage inflicted on the walls by the attackers was promptly repaired, thanks to the fort's sturdy construction. However, the relentless assault with matin and zopin eventually resulted in a significant breach in the outer fortifications, causing chaos among the fort's occupants as they sought refuge within the inner fort.

Recognizing the strategic importance of a water reservoir within the fort, which provided a crucial advantage to the defenders, Khalji ordered an attack on the reservoir's dams. The breach caused the water to escape and become contaminated, creating a water shortage that added to the besieged's hardships and increased the likelihood of a swift surrender. Additionally, Khalji ordered the filling of a portion of the ditch surrounding the outer wall to facilitate access for his army and enable entry into the fort.

Once the ditch was filled, the defenders emerged from the inner fort with determination, engaging in a fierce battle. While some Rajputs valiantly fought to the end, others opted to surrender, offering ten lakhs of tankas as tribute and relinquishing control of the fort. However, due to the failing reservoirs of water caused by the firing of the cannons, the garrison eventually surrendered. Ultimately, the fort was successfully captured on 20 October 1457.

== Aftermath ==
After allowing the occupants of the Mandalgarh fort to evacuate without further hindrance and releasing the captives upon payment of the required tribute, Khalji proceeded to enter the fort on the 6th of Zilhijja. Inside the fort, he construct a mosque in fort. Furthermore, he appointed a qazi, a mufti, a muhtasib, a khatib, and a muazzin, establishing their stipends as well. These actions signified a symbolic transition to a permanent occupation, demonstrating the transformation that had occurred rather than being driven solely by religious fervor. With his long-held ambitions fulfilled and arrangements in place, Khalji then shifted his focus to other endeavors. The fort was soon recaptured by Kumbha.

== See also ==
- Battle of Mandalgarh and Banas
- Capture of Gagron (1444)
