= Rana Kumbha =

Maharana of Mewar from 1433 to 1468

Kumbhakaran Singh Sisodia
- Maharana; Abhinav Bharatacharya; Veenavadan Pravinen; Paramguru; Rajaguru; Hindu sultan
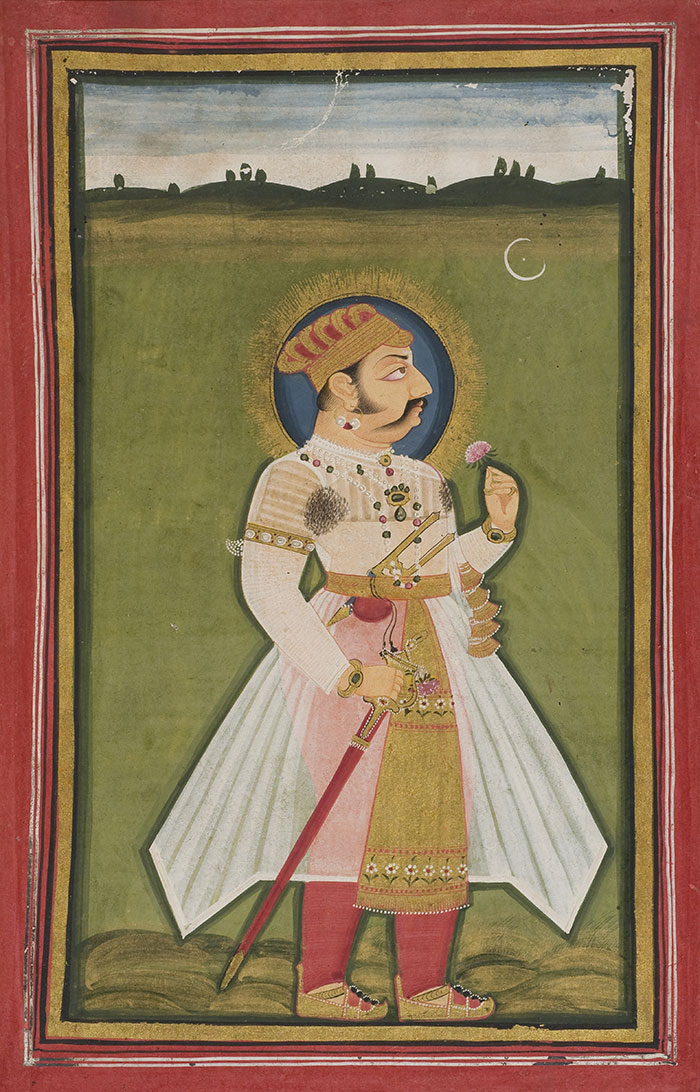
- Portrait of Maharana Kumbha

Rana of Mewar
- Reign: 1433–1468
- Coronation: 1433
- Predecessor: Mokal Singh
- Successor: Udai Singh I
- Born: 1417; Madaria, Mewar, Rajputana
- Died: 1468 (aged 51); Kumbhalgarh Fort, Mewar, Rajputana
- Spouse: Kanak Deiji Gaur; Aparam Deiji Tomar; Har Deiji Hada of Bundi; Navrang Deiji Kherad; Apoorav Deiji Rathore; Suhag Deiji Parmar; Man Deiji Chauhan
- Issue: 14 including: Udai Singh I; Rana Raimal
Names
- Rana Kumbhkaran Singh Sisodia
- Dynasty: Sisodia
- Father: Mokal Singh
- Mother: Sankhaliji (Parmarji) Saubhag Deiji d.of Rao Jaitmal of Roon in Marwar
- Religion: Shaivism (Hinduism)
- Military career
- Conflicts: Mewar-Malwa Conflict: Battle of Sarangpur; Battle of Mandalgarh; Battle of Banas; Capture of Gagron; Siege of Mandsaur; Conquest of Ajmer; Battle of Mandalgarh; Battle of Kumbalgarh; Mewar–Nagaur War: Battle of Nagaur; Mewar–Gujarat War: Battle of Mewar; Battle of Kumbalgarh

Kumbhakaran Singh (IAST: Kumbhakarṇa Siṃha) (1417–1468), popularly known as Maharana Kumbha, was the ruler of the Kingdom of Mewar in medieval India. He belonged to the Sisodia clan which is a cadet Branch of Guhila Rajputs. It was during his reign that Mewar became one of the most powerful political powers in northern India. He is considered to be one of the most powerful King of his time in South Asia.

== Early life ==
Rana Kumbha was born at Madariya, in a Hindu Rajput family of Sisodia clan. Kumbha was a son of Rana Mokal Singh of Mewar by his wife, Sobhagya Devi, a daughter of Jaitmal Sankhla, the Paramara fief-holder of Runkot in the state of Marwar. He was the 48th Rana of Mewar and succeeded Rana Mokal Singh in the year 1433 CE as the ruler of Mewar. During his minority his regents were his Grandmother, Dowager Queen Hansa and his Great Uncle, Ridmal. Hansa was known to have been the primary educator of Kumbha during his youth and had considerable influence over him during his reign.

== Military career ==
When Kumbha ascended the throne he had inherited whole of Mewar which consisted of Chittorgarh, Kumbhalmer, Rajsamand, Mandalgarh, Ajmer, Mandsaur, Idar, Badnore, Jalore, Hadoti, Dungarpur and Banswara. Kumbha then increased the possessions of Mewar by fighting 56 battles in his whole life in which he was said to have lost none. His conquest included Jangladesha, Sapdalpaksha, Marwar, Sarangpur, Narwar, Haravati, Ranthambore, Visalpur, Abu, Sirohi, Gagraun and the Muslim sultanate of Nagore. He also humbled the Sultans of Malwa and Gujarat many times in Battles of Sarangpur, Nagore, Mandalgarh and Banas.

War against Malwa Sultanate

As one of the assassins of Rana Mokal, Mahpa Panwar, was sheltered by the Sultan of Mandu, a demand for his person was made by the Maharana, but Mahmud Khilji refused to surrender the refugee. The Maharana prepared for hostilities and advanced to attack Mandu. The Sultan advanced with a powerful army to meet Kumbha. Both armies met at Sarangpur and the battle commenced is known as battle of Sarangpur. After a severe engagement the sultan's army was defeated and sultan was forced to flee to the fort of Mandu, following the victory Rana Kumbha laid siege to the fort of Mandu and captured the sultan, who was later freed. Rana captured the areas of Gagron, Ranthambore, Sarangpur, and Narwar from the Malwa Sultanate. He also annexed region of Hadoti. In the coming years Sultan made several attempts to revenge his defeats in the battle of Mandalgarh and Banas but every time he was defeated.

War Against Marwar

Kumbha's father was assassinated of his own kins named Chacha and Maira. However, with the help of King of Marwar Rao Ranmal Rathore who was Kumbha's father Mokal's uncle and his guardian, he was able to defeat the murderers of his father and secure the throne of Mewar for himself. Due to the growing powers of Rathores in Mewari court which was detested by his courtiers and subjects alike, and Ranmal's bad influence, Kumbha had Ranmal assassinated. With the assassination of Ranmal, Kingdom of Marwar too fell into the hands of Kumbha. It took Jodha, son of Ranmal, several years to re-conqueror Marwar from Kumbha. The Delhi sultanate also took advantage and captured Nagaur, Jalore and Siwana. Jodha eventually captured Merta, Phalodi, Pokran, Bhadrajun, Sojat, Jaitaran, Siwana, parts of Nagaur and Godwar from the Delhi Sultanate and Mewar. In 1453 AD, he was able to capture his ancestral capital of Mandore from Mewar. After the capture of Mandore, Marwar and Mewar signed a treaty through which peace was restored. Rao Jodha's daughter was also married to Rana Kumbha's son Raimal. According to Mewari accounts it was rani Hansa Bai of Mewar who arranged for peace between her grandson Kumbha and nephew Jodha.

Conquest of the Nagore Sultanate

Rana Kumbha started the conquest of Nagore due the harsh treatment of Hindus there. Shams Khan son of the sultan of Nagore fled to Maharana Kumbha for shelter and help. Rana Kumbha who had long designs on Nagaur, gladly embraced this opportunity of carrying them out, and agreed to place Shams Khan on the throne of Nagaur on the condition that he acknowledged Rana Kumbha's supremacy by demolishing a part of the battlements of the fort of that place.Shams Khan accepted the terms.Rana Kumbha marched with a large army to Nagaur, defeated Mujahid, who fled towards Gujarat, and placed Shams Khan on the throne of Nagaur, and demanded of him the fulfillment of the condition. But Shams Khan humbly prayed to the Maharana to spare the fort, for otherwise his nobles would kill him after the Maharana was gone. He promised to demolish the battlements himself later on. The Maharana granted this prayer and returned to Mewar.

No sooner, however, had Rana Kumbha the fortification of Nagaur. This brought Kumbha on the scene again with a large army. Shams Khan was driven out of Nagaur, which had now passed into Kumbha's hand.

War with Gujarat Sultanate

Shams Khan sultan of Nagore fled to Ahmedabad, taking with him his daughter, whom he married to Sultan Qutb-ud-din Ahmad Shah II. The Sultan thereupon espoused his cause and sent a large army under Rai Ram Chandra and Malik Gadday to take back Nagaur. Rana Kumbha allowed the army to approach Nagaur, when he came out, and after a severe engagement, inflicted a crushing defeat on the Gujarat Sultanate army, annihilating it. Only remnants of it reached Ahmedabad, to carry the news of the disaster to the Sultan. The Sultan now took the field in person, determined to wrest Nagor back from the Maharana. The Maharana advanced to meet him and came to Mount Abu. In S. 1513 (A.D. 1456) the Sultan of Gujrat "despairing of reducing Chitor" arrived near Abu and sent his Commander-in-Chief, Malik Shaaban Imad-ul-Mulk, with a large army, to take the fort of Abu, and himself marched upon the fortress of Kumbhalgarh. Kumbha, aware of this plan, came out, attacked and "defeated Imad-ul-Mulk with great slaughter," and He by forced marched Kumbhalgarh before the Sultan arrived there. He also conquered regions of Abu and Sirohi.

Fighting the Combined Attacks of Malwa Gujarat and Nagore Sultanate

After getting repeatedly defeated by Kumbha, Sultans of Gujrat, Malwa and Nagor prepared to take joint actions against Mewar and divide the spoils. Sultan of Gujrat move towards Kumbalgarh but was defeated there. Nagor was also defeated. Sultan of Malwa took Mewar territories up to Ajmer but after seeing defeats of the sultans of Gujrat and Nagor allowed Rana Kumbha to recapture his lost territories.

== Construction of forts ==
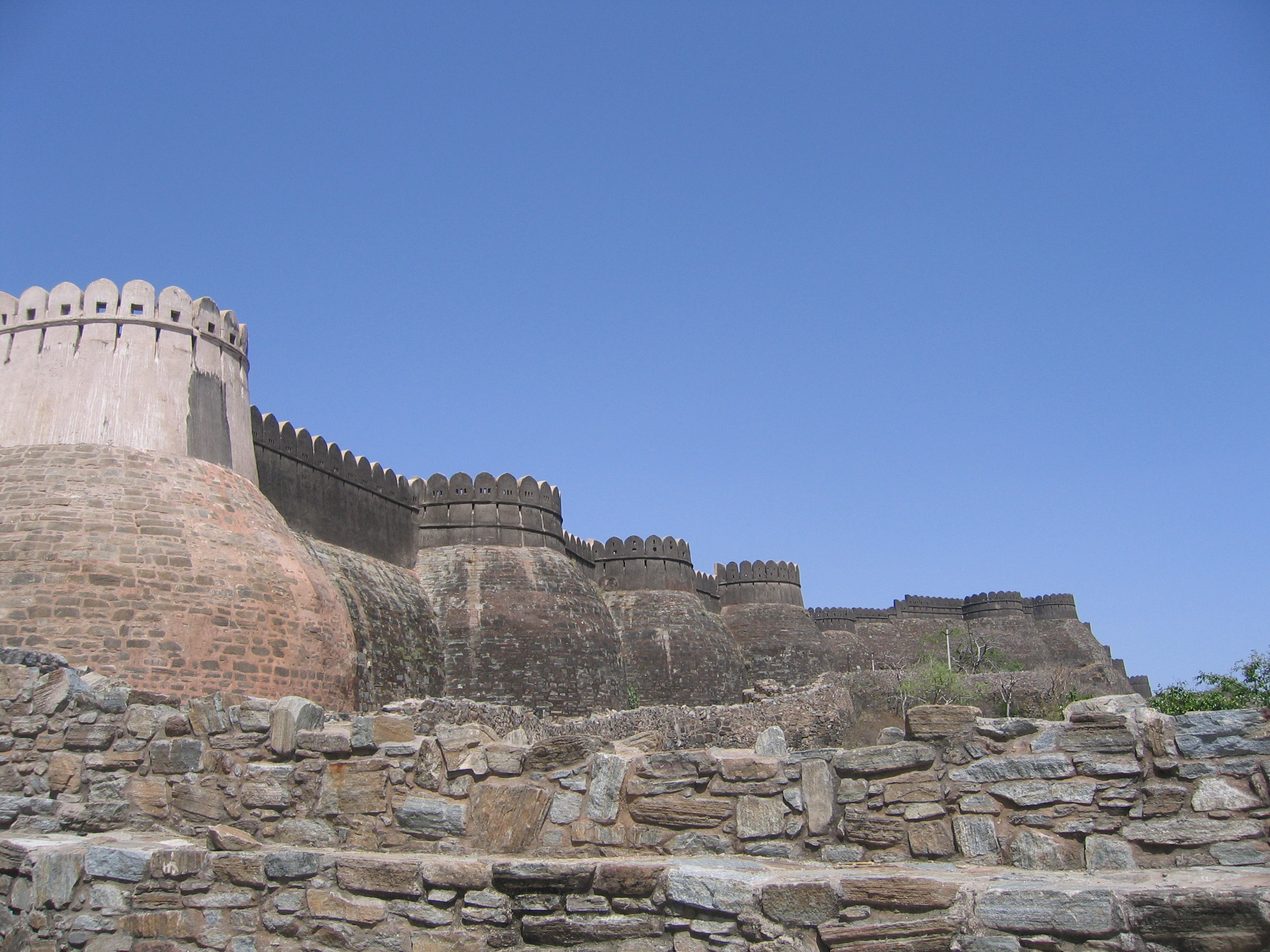
The walls of the fort of Kumbhalgarh extend over 38 km

Kumbha is credited with having worked assiduously to build up the state again. Of 84 fortresses that form the defense of Mewar, 32 were erected by Kumbha. The chief citadel of Mewar, is the fort of Kumbhalgarh, built by Kumbha. It is the highest fort in Rajasthan (MRL 1075m).

== Other architecture ==
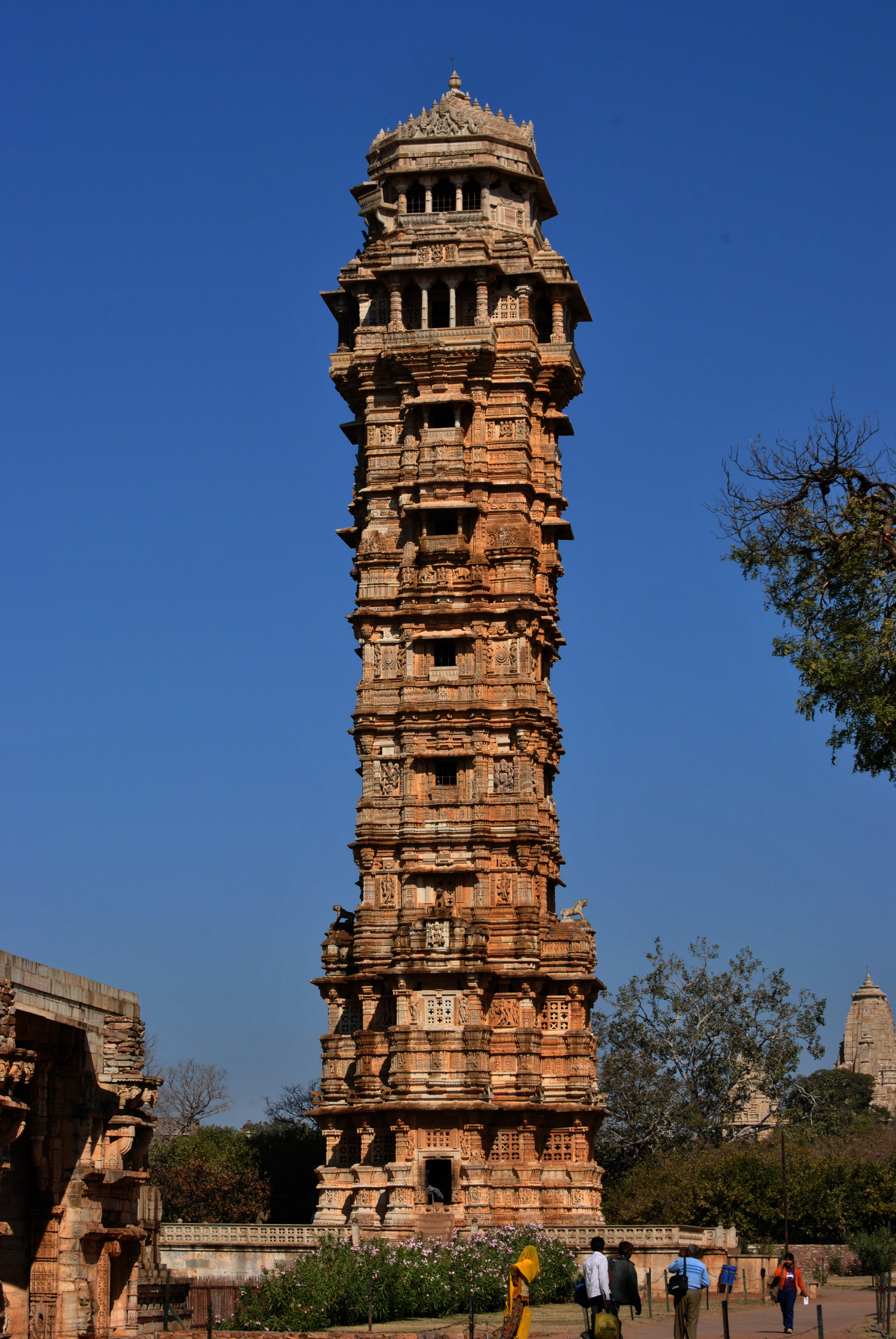
Vijay Stambha was constructed by Rana Kumbha in 1448 CE to commemorate his victory over the combined armies of Malwa and Gujarat led by Mahmud Khalji.

Rana Kumbha commissioned the construction of a 37-metre (121 ft) high, nine-storey tower at Chittor. The tower, called Vijay Stambha (Tower of Victory), was completed probably between 1458 and 1468, although some sources date it to 1448. The tower is covered with sculptures of Hindu gods and goddesses and depicts episodes from the Ramayana and the Mahabharata. The Vijay Stambha's column is one hundred and twenty feet in height; the breadth of each face at the base is thirty-five feet, and at the summit, immediately under the cupola, seventeen feet and a half. It stands on an ample terrace, forty - two feet square. It has nine distinct storeys, with openings at every face of each storey, and all these doors have colonnaded porticos.

There are many inscriptions on the Stambha from the time of Kumbha.

- Verse 17: Kumbha is like the mountain Sumeru for the churning of the sea of Malwa.
- Verse 20: He also destroyed other lowly Mleccha rulers (of the neighborhood). He uprooted Nagaur.
- Verse 21: He rescued twelve lakh cows from the Muslim possession and converted Nagaur into a safe pasture for them. He brought Nagaur under the control of the Brahmanas and secured cows and Brahmanas in this land.
- Verse 22: Nagaur was centre of the Mleccha. Kumbha uprooted this tree of evil. Its branches and leaves were automatically destroyed.

The Ranakpur Trailokya-dipaka Jain temple with its adornments, the Kumbhashyam temple and Adivarsha temples of Chittor and the Shantinatha Jain temple are some of the many other structures built during Rana Kumbha's rule.

== Contributions in arts and music ==
Kumbha was himself well versed in veena playing and patronised musicians as well as artists in his court. He himself wrote a commentary on Gita Govinda of Jaidev and an explanation on Chandisatkam. He also wrote treatises on music called "Sageet raj", "Sangeet mimansa"; "Sangeet ratnakar" and "Shudprabandha". He was the author of four dramas in which he used Sanskrit, Prakrit, and local Rajasthani dialects. In his reign, the scholars Atri and his son Mahesa wrote Prashashti on Kirti stambha. He was well versed in Vedas, Upanishad, and Vyakrana.

== Death and aftermath ==
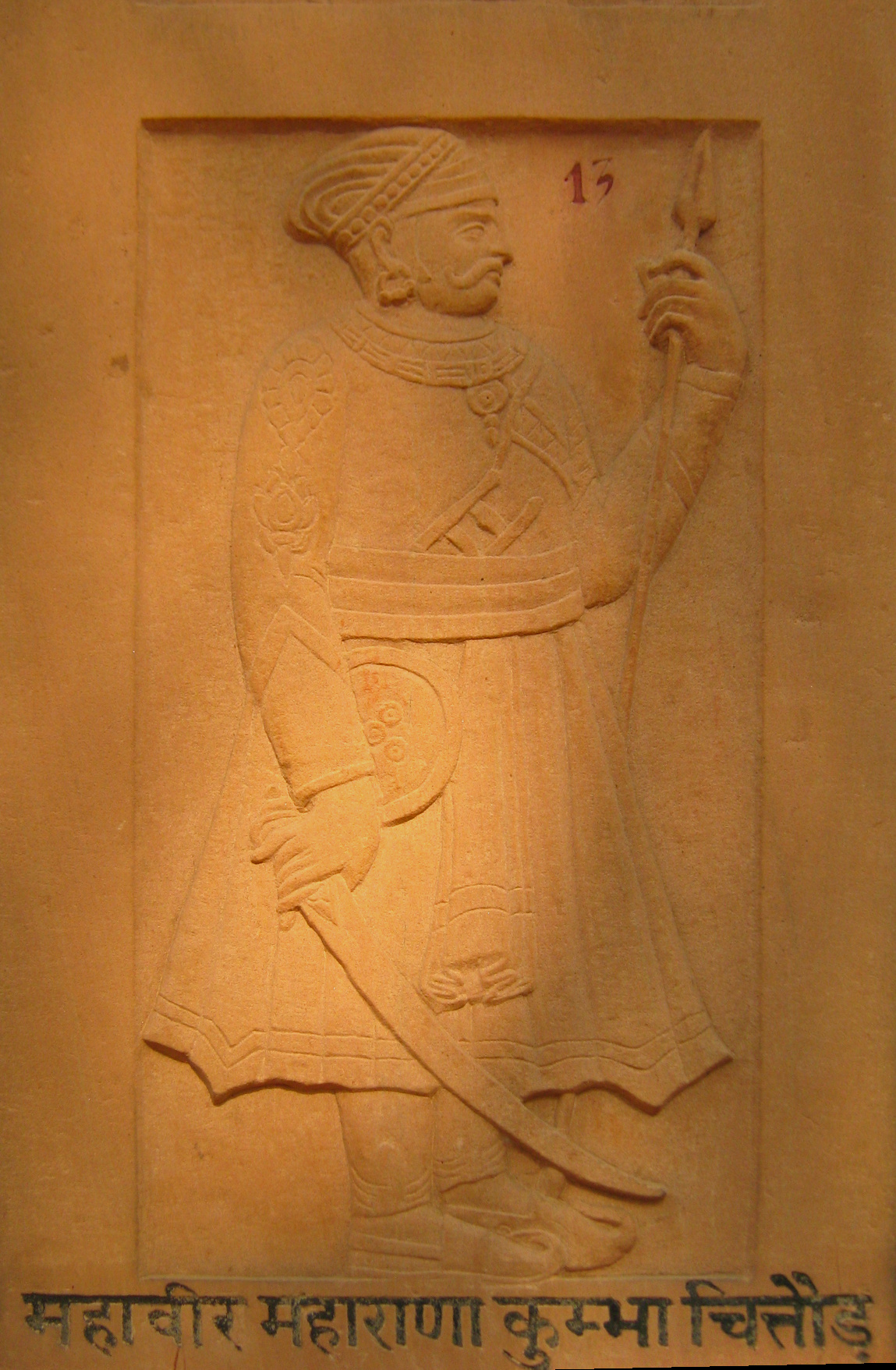
Bas relief of Rana Kumbha at Birla Mandir

Kumbha was killed by his son Udaysimha (Udai Singh I), who thereafter became known as Hatyara (Murderer). He was murdered at the time when he was sitting and praying at the edge of Mahadeva near the temple of Kumbhaswami at Kumbhalgarh. Udai himself died in 1473, with the cause of death sometimes being stated as a result of being struck by lightning but more likely to have also been murder.

== Bibliography ==
- Ram Vallabh Somani (1976). History of Mewar, from Earliest Times to 1751 A.D. Mateshwari. OCLC 2929852.

Rana Kumbha Sisodia Rajput Clan Born: 1433 Died: 1468
Preceded by Rana Mokal	Sisodia Rajput Ruler; 1433–1468	Succeeded by Udai Singh I
