= Battle of Mandalgarh (1473) =

1473 battle between Malwa and Mewar

- Part of Mewar-Malwa Conflict
Date	1473
Location	Mandalgarh, Rajasthan, India 25.1978°N 75.0932°E
Result	Rajput victory

Belligerents
Kingdom of Mewar: Amber State; Bundi State; Kotah State	Malwa Sultanate

Commanders and leaders
Rana Raimal	Ghiyath Shah; Zafar Khan
- Mandalgarh: Battlefield location

The Battle of Mandalgarh took place in 1473. Following an earlier unsuccessful attempt by Ghiyath Shah (r. 1469–1500), the Sultan of Malwa, to capture Chittorgarh from the Kingdom of Mewar, Zafir Khan, one of Ghiyath Shah's generals, led a force which raided and plundered Mewar. In response, a combined force of Rajput armies, assembled by the Maharana of Mewar, met Zafir's army at Mandalgarh; here too, the Malwa forces met with a crushing defeat.

== Prelude ==
In 1473 sultan Ghiyath Shah succeeded his father Mahmud Khalji and he undertook several expeditions against Mewad. The sultan of Malwa laid siege of Chittor and devastated Dungarpur, Rata and Kalla two resilient warriors were killed in the defense. The Rajputs, led by Rana Raimal, resisted and successfully defended against multiple attacks. A Rajput of Gaur community displayed great determination and killed many soldiers of sultan of Malwa. Zahir, along with many other officers were killed and sultan was forced to retreat.

== Outcome ==
Early in the reign of Rana Raimal of Mewar (r. 1473–1509), a general of the Sultan of Malwa's army, Zafar Khan, marched into Mewar at the head of a large force. The armed incursions may have been at the behest of his sultan, Ghiyath Shah, who remained in his capital at Mandu, or possibly Zafir embarked on his raiding on his own initiative. In either case, a desire to redress the earlier severe defeat of Malwar forces under their sultan, Ghiyath Shah, was likely the instigating factor in the raids. During his campaign, Zafir captured Kotah, Bhainsror and Sheopur, installing his own local thanadars (administrators). The countryside in the vicinity was plundered and laid waste.

Upon hearing of the Malwar incursions, Rana Raimal called his chiefs, including the governors of Amber, Chanderi and Raisen, to march with him against Zafar Khan. The opposing forces met and clashed at Mandalgarh, where Zafar Khan was soundly routed by the combined Rajput force, losing many of his commanders in the battle. Rana Raimal pursued Zafar in his retreat to Mandu, catching up with him at Khairabad (near Kotah) where the opposing armies fought again. The Rajputs sacked the town and extracted heavy fines from the Sultan of Malwa.

== See also ==
- List of battles of Rajasthan
- List of wars involving India
