= Rana Raimal =

Rana of Mewar from 1473 to 1509

- Rana of Mewar

Rana of Mewar
- Reign: 1473 – 1500
- Predecessor: Udai Singh I
- Successor: Rana Sanga
- Died: 24 May 1509; Chittor, Kingdom of Mewar
- Spouse: List: Jhaliji Ratan Deiji of Halvad Rathorji Shringar Deiji of Marwar Devadiji Champa Deiji of Sirohi Rathorji (Mahechiji) Indra Deiji of Malani Rathorji (Mertaniji) Kumkum Deiji of Merta
- Issue: List: Prithvirajji; Jaimalji; Rana Sanga; Kalyanmalji; Fateh Singh; Rai Singh; Bhawani Das; Kishan Das; Narayan Das; Shankar Das; Devi Das; Sundar Das; Ishwar Das; Beni Das; Damodar Deiji m.to Raja Prithviraj Singh I of Amber; Har Deiji m.to Rao Viramdev of Merta; Anand Deiji m.to Rao Jagmal of Sirohi; Sisodiniji (name unknown) m.to Rao Lunkaran of Bikaner; Roop Deiji m.to Rana Ajja Jhala of Bari Sadri
- Dynasty: Sisodias of Mewar
- Father: Rana Kumbha
- Mother: Gaurji Kanak Deiji d.of Rao Motraj and granddaughter of Rao Narsinghdas of Maroth
- Military career
- Conflicts: Mewar–Malwa conflicts: Siege of Chittor; Battle of Mandalgarh; Battle of Chittor; Civil War: Battle of Sadri; Mewar-Delhi Conflicts: Battle of Mewar

Rana Raimal Singh, also known as Rana Raimal, (r. 1473–1509) was a Hindu Rajput ruler of the Kingdom of Mewar. Rana Raimal was the younger son of Rana Kumbha and younger brother of his predecessor Rana Udai Singh I and father of Rana Sanga.

He came to power by defeating his patricide predecessor Rana Udai Singh I in battles at Jawar, Darimpur and Pangarh. Early in Rana Raimal's reign, Sultan Ghiyas Shah of the Malwa Sultanate unsuccessfully attacked the Mewar capital, Chittor. Soon after Ghiyas Shah's general, Zafar Khan attacked Mewar and was defeated at Mandalgarh and Kairabad in north east of Mewar. By marrying Rathorji Shringar Deiji (daughter of Rao Jodha) Rana Raimal ended the long standing conflict with Rathore Rajputs. During Raimal's reign, Godwar, Toda and Ajmer were recaptured by his eldest son Prithviraj. Raimal also strengthened the state of Mewar and repaired the temple of Eklingji in Chittor.

== Accession ==
Raimal was not the heir-apparent as he was younger to Udai Singh I. But as fate would have it, Udai Singh I killed his father, the legendary Rana Kumbha, while he was praying to Lord Eklingji (Shiva) and ruled for five years.

== Raimal fights the sultan and his nephews ==
Sultan of Delhi, Sikander Lodi fought against Rana Raimal of Mewar, allying with Surajmal and Sahasmal in which the Sultan was defeated. Surajmal survived and was pardoned by Rana Raimal. He was a conspirator and ensured that sons of Raimal fought with each other in order to make his way clear to the throne. He was a brave fighter and possessed all the great qualities of his clan.

== Fight at Sadri ==
Surajmal and Raimal's armies met at Sadri, a town that Surajmal had captured. Raimal's son Prithviraj joined his father at a crucial time in the war and directly attacked Surajmal. Many such skirmishes occurred till Surajmal finally left Mewar and settled at Pratapgarh where his descendants still flourish and keep up the name of Sisodia clan.

== Last years ==
The last years of Raimal's rule were marked by conflict between his sons, with Prince Sanga (later Rana Sanga) having to flee Mewar. Raimal's elder sons, Prithviraj and Jaimal were both killed. At this difficult juncture, the Rana was informed that Sanga was still alive. Raimal summoned Sanga back to Chittor and died soon afterwards.

== See also ==
- Battle of Mandalgarh

== Bibliography ==
- Day, Upendra Nath. "Medieval Malwa: A Political and Cultural History, 1401-1562". Delhi University, History Department. p. 257.
- Ram Vallabh Somani (1976). History of Mewar, from Earliest Times to 1751 A.D. Mateshwari. OCLC 2929852.
- Sharma, Gopi Nath (1954). Mewar & the Mughal Emperors (1526-1707 A.D.). S.L. Agarwala.

Rana Raimal Sisodia Rajput Clan Born: 1473 Died: 1508
Preceded by Udai Singh I	Sisodia Rajput Ruler; 1473–1508	Succeeded by Rana Sanga
