= Siege of Gagron (1444) =

Capture of Gargaon by Mahmud Khalji

- Part of Mewar-Malwa Conflict
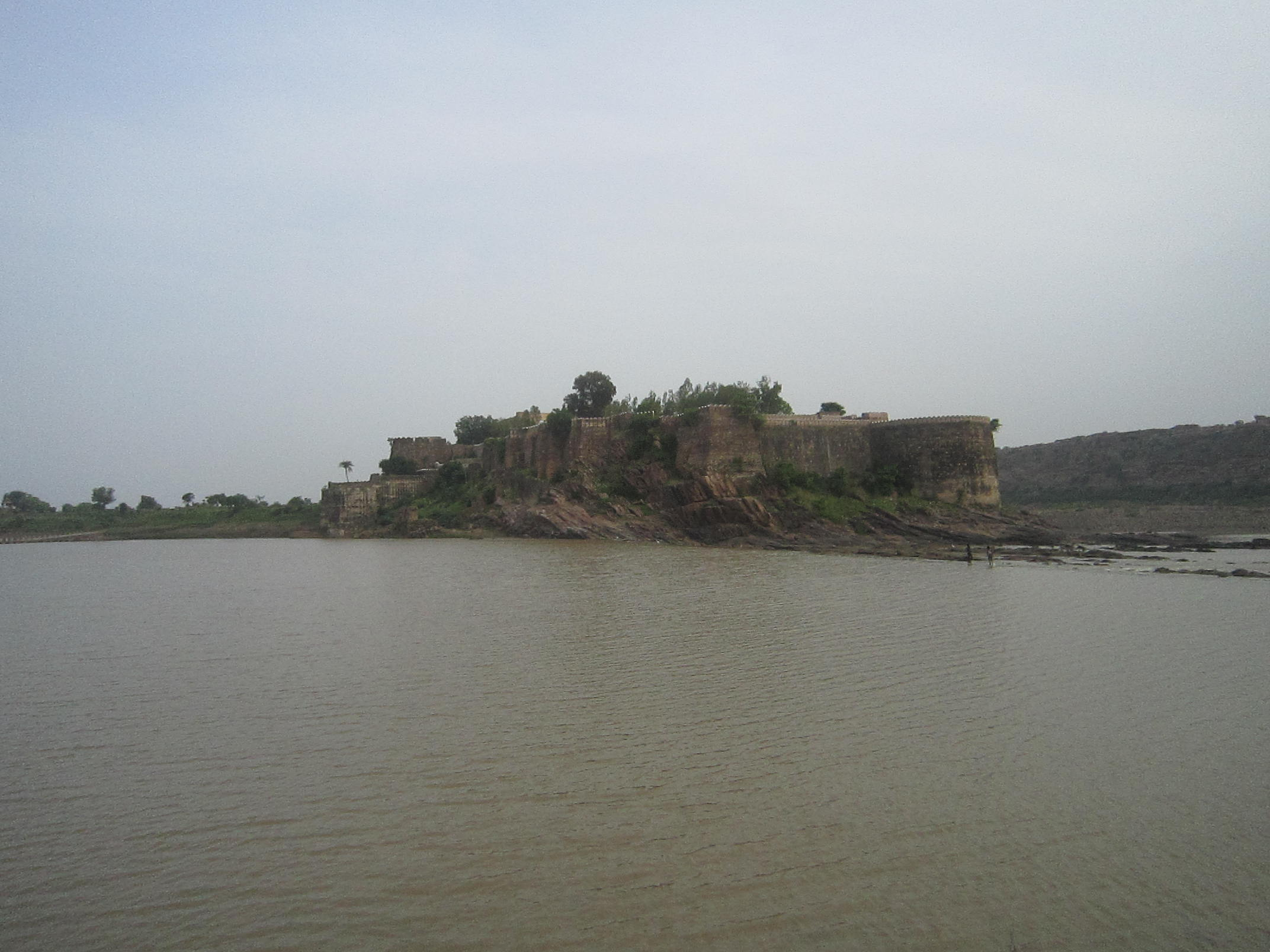
- Gagron fort
Date	February 1444
Location	Gagron Fort, Rajasthan 24.627937°N 76.182957°E
Result	Malwa Sultanate victory
Territorial changes	Gagron and 24 forts annexed by Malwa Sultanate

Belligerents
Malwa Sultanate	Khichi Chauhan Rajputs; Kingdom of Mewar

Commanders and leaders
Mahmud Khalji	Palhan Singh †; Dahir †
- Location within Rajasthan

The Siege of Gagron in 1444 was a military campaign led by Mahmud Khalji of the Malwa Sultanate against the Khichi Chauhan Rajputs. The conflict resulted in the defeat of the Chauhan Rajputs and the forces of Mewar. Dahir, the commander serving Rana Kumbha, was among those defeated. The Gagron fort was successfully besieged, leading to the death of its ruler, Palhan Singh.

After capturing Gagron, Mahmud Khalji extended control by conquering an additional 24 forts held by local chiefs. This campaign demonstrated Mahmud's strategic ability and dominance over the Khichi Chauhan Rajputs, shaping the region's dynamics in the aftermath of Gagron's fall.

== Background ==
In 1443, the fort of Gagron was under the rule of Palhan Singh Khichi, the leader of the Khichi Kingdom, which is a sub-clan of the Chauhan Rajputs. The Khichis were close allies of the Rajputs of Mewar. When Rana Kumbha ascended to power, the Khichis played a crucial role as a strong support on the eastern side of the Kingdom.

The fort of Gagron was conquered by Hoshang Shah from Achaldas Khichi, the father of Palhan Singh after defeating them in 1423. It was then placed under Prince Ghazni Khan, who strengthened its fortifications by adding more ramparts, bastions, and extending the walls to the Sindh River. After Ghazni Khan, Sultan Mahmud entrusted the fort to Badar Khan. Following Badar Khan's death in a battle against Gujarat Sultanate, the fort came under the control of Dilshad. However, Palhan Singh Khichi eventually succeeded in reconquering it. Mahmud Khalji, engaged in internal conflicts and other campaigns, postponed his conquest of Gagron. However, in 1444, Mahmud Khalji marched towards Gagron with the intention of capturing it.

== The conflict ==
Mahmud marched towards Gagron, reaching the vicinity of the river Ahuti, where he established his camp on February 3, 1444. Palhan Singh sought assistance from Rana Kumbha and local chiefs. In response, Rana Kumbha dispatched his commander Dahir with military support and weapons. Recognizing that the capture of Gagron fort would jeopardize their independence, other chiefs also sent aid to Palhan.

From the banks of the river, Sultan Mahmud pressed forward, nearing the fort, and successfully blocking all access to it. The Mewar forces launched an attack on the Malwa forces outside the fort, resulting in a seven-day battle where the Rajputs were defeated, and their commander Dahir was killed. Upon learning of Dahir's death, Palhan Singh tried to escape from the fort but was captured and executed. Palhan Singh's demise marked the end of the battle, leading the fort's female inhabitants to commit Jauhar. After seizing the fort, Mahmud distributed the plunder and spoils to his soldiers, concluding with a thanksgiving ceremony.

== Aftermath ==
After the capture of Gagron, Mahmud Khalji extended his control by seizing the 24 nearby forts. Faced with panic, the chiefs of these forts evacuated in response to Mahmud's conquest of the region. Having subdued the Khichi Rajputs, Mahmud undertook the restoration of Gagron's fortifications. Recognizing the potential challenge to his authority over Gagron by Rana Kumbha, Mahmud strategically stationed a robust contingent in the fort and proceeded to march towards Mandalgarh with the aim of capturing it.
