= Kumbha's invasions of Nagaur =

1455 battle in India

Battle of Nagaur
- Part of Mewar-Nagaur Sultanate wars
Date	1455
Location	Nagaur, India
Result	Rajput victory
Territorial changes	Nagaur, Khandela and Sambhar annexed by Mewar.

Belligerents
Kingdom of Mewar	Nagaur Sultanate

Commanders and leaders
Rana Kumbha	Shams Khan; Anupsingh Manik; Malik Gadai; Mujahid Khan

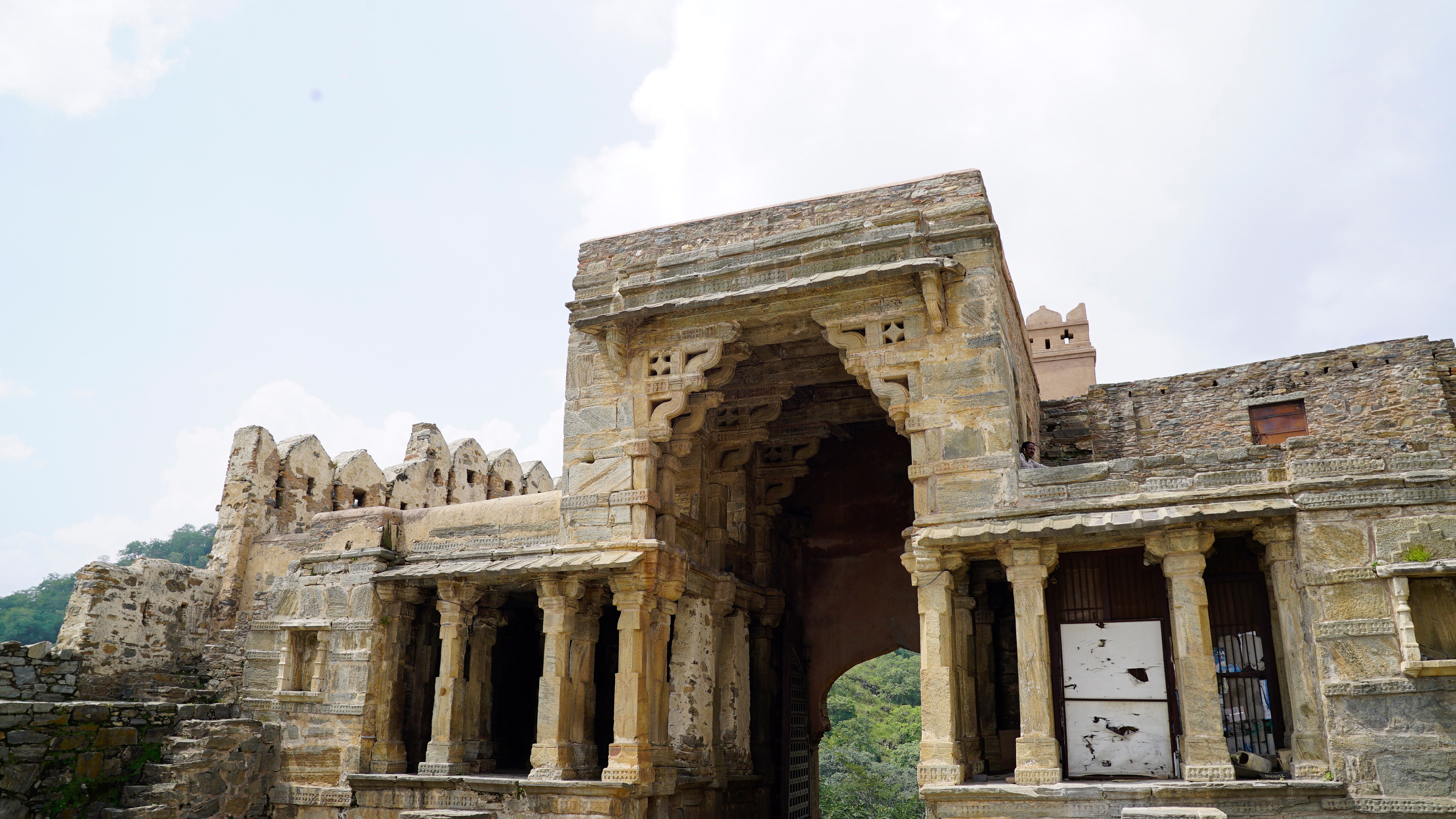
Hanuman Pol in Kumbhalgarh Fort

The Battle of Nagaur was fought between the Rajputs of Mewar and the Nagaur Sultanate. It started within Nagaur as a feud between two brothers, Mujahid Khan and Shams Khan. Shams Khan was defeated and took aid from Rana Kumbha the ruler of Mewar. Shams Khan was able to take Nagaur from his brother with the help of the Rana, but he refused to fulfill his promise to demolish a part of the battlements of the fort. This resulted in another war in which Rana Kumbha won and annexed Nagaur. He took away from the treasury of Shams Khan a large store of precious stones, jowels and other valuable things. The Eklinga Mahatmya composed during Kumbha's lifetime, says that he “defeated the King of the Shakas (Mussalmans), put to flight Mashiti (Mujahid ?), slew the heroes of Nagpur (Nagor), destroyed the fort, filled up the moat round the fort, captured elephants, imprisoned Shaka women and punished countless Mussalmans. He gained a victory over the King of Gujrat, burnt the city (Nagor) with all the mosques therein, liberated twelve lakhs of cows from the Moslems, made the land a pasture for cows and gave Nagor for a time to Brahmans. He carried away the gates of the fort and an image of Hanuman from Nagor, which he placed at the principal gate of the fortress of Kumbhalgarh, calling it the Hanumán Pol.

== Background ==
Feroz Khan, Sultan of Nagaur died in 1455. He belonged to the family of Kings of Gujarat Sultanate, and was originally a governor of the province of Nagaur, under the Delhi Sultanate. He had however thrown off his allegiance to Delhi and become independent. On his death, his elder son, Shams Khan, succeeded him, but his younger son, Mujahid Khan, deposed him and prepared to take his life. Shams Khan fled to Maharana Kumbha for shelter and help. rana Kumbha who had long designs on Nagaur, gladly embraced this opportunity of carrying them out, and agreed to place Shams Khan on the throne of Nagaur on the condition that he acknowledged rana Kumbha's supremacy by demolishing a part of the battlements of the fort of that place. Shams Khan accepted the terms.

== Battle ==
Rana Kumbha marched with a large army to Nagaur, defeated Mujahid, who fled towards Gujarat, and placed Shams Khan on the throne of Nagaur, and demanded of him the fulfillment of the condition. But Shams Khan humbly prayed to the Maharana to spare the fort, for otherwise his nobles would kill him after the Maharana was gone. He promised to demolish the battlements himself later on. The Maharana granted this prayer and returned to Mewar.

No sooner, however, had Rana Kumbha reached Kumbalgarh when he got the news that Shams Khan instead of demolishing, began to strengthen the fortification of Nagaur. This brought Kumbha on the scene again with a large army. Shams Khan was driven out of Nagaur, which passed into Kumbha's possession. The Maharana now demolished the fortification of Nagaur and thus carried out his long-cherished design.

== Battle with Ahmad Shah II ==
Shams Khan fled to Ahmedabad, taking with him his daughter, whom he married to Sultan Qutb-ud-din Ahmad Shah II. The Sultan thereupon espoused his cause and sent a large army under Rai Ram Chandra and Malik Gadday to take back Nagaur. Rana Kumbha allowed the army to approach Nagaur, when he came out, and after a severe engagement, inflicted a crushing defeat on the Gujarat Sultanate army, annihilating it. Only remnants of it reached Ahmedabad, to carry the news of the disaster to the Sultan.

== Aftermath ==
Rana Kumbha took away the treasury of Shams Khan a large store of precious stones, jewels and other valuable things. He also carried away the gates of the fort and an image of Hanuman from Nagaur, which he placed at the principal gate of the fortress of Kumbalgarh, calling it the Hanuman Pol.

== Sources ==
- Bayley, Sir Edward Clive (1970). Gujarat. Chand.
- Brigg, Col., translation of Ferishta's history of the Mahometan dynasties, 3 vol.
- Sarda, Har Bilas (1917). Maharana Kumbha: Sovereign, Soldier, Scholar. Scottish Mission Industries Company.
