= Kumbhalgarh =

Fort at Rajsamand District of Rajasthan

Kumbhalgarh Fort
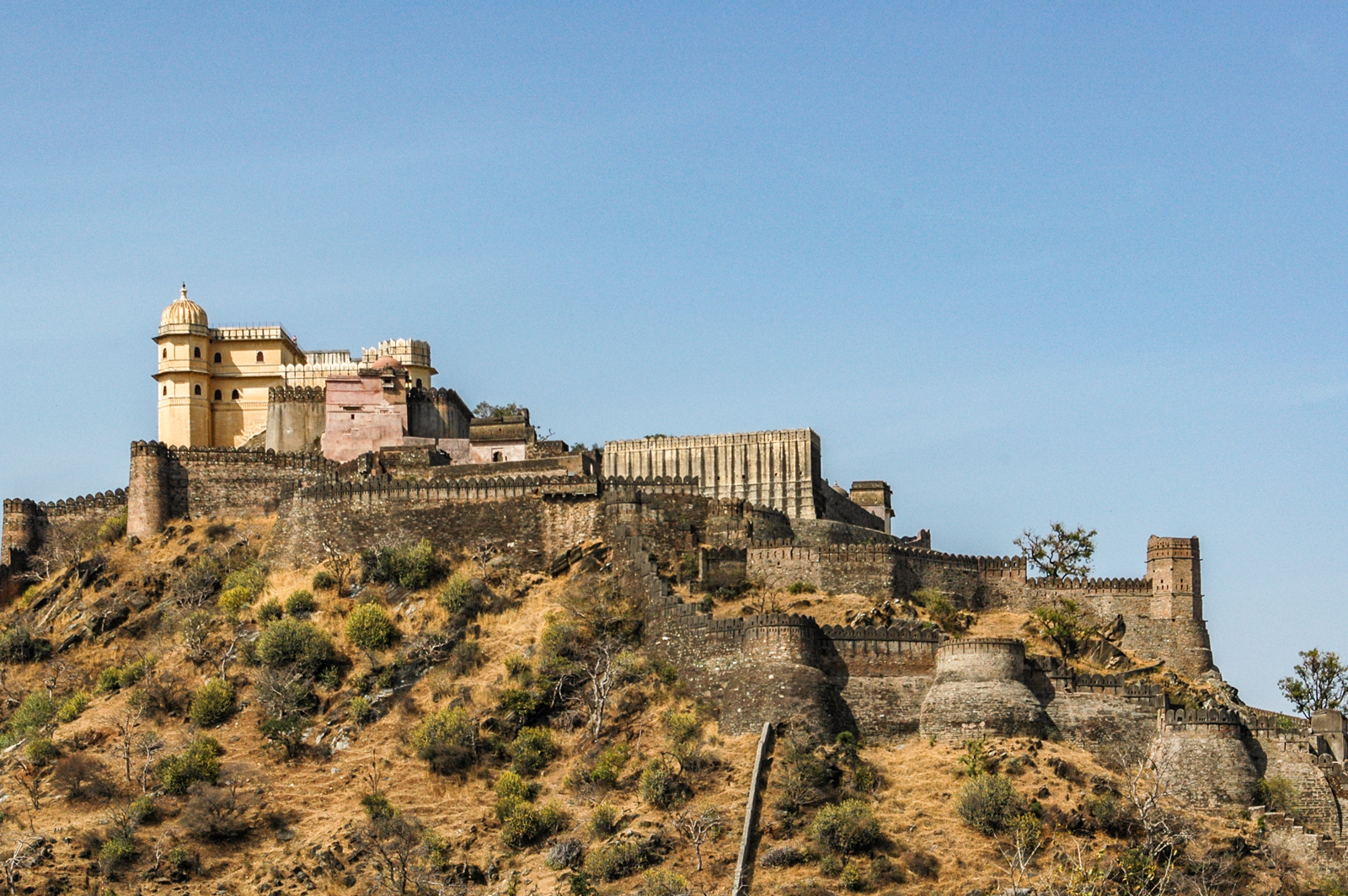
- Kumbhalgarh Fort in Rajsamand district (Rajasthan)

- Location within Rajasthan Location within India
- 25°8′56″N 73°34′49″E
- Type: Fortress
- Location: Kumbhalgarh, Rajsamand district, Rajasthan, India

History
- Built: 1448 A.D.

Site notes
- Area: 268 ha (1.03 sq mi) (662 acres)

UNESCO World Heritage Site
- Type: Cultural
- Criteria: ii, iii
- Designated: 2013 (36th session)
- Part of: Hill Forts of Rajasthan
- Reference no.: 247
- Country: India
- Region: South Asia

Kumbhalgarh also known as the Great Wall of India, is a fortress located on the western range of the Aravalli Hills in Kumbhalgarh, Rajsamand district, Rajasthan, India. Located approximately 48 km (30 mi) from Rajsamand and 84 km (52 mi) from Udaipur, the fort was constructed in the 15th century by Rana Kumbha. The wall of Kumbhalgarh is one of the longest continuous walls in the world, spanning 36 kilometers. It is also the birthplace of great king and military leader Maharana Pratap of Mewar.

In 2013, at the 37th session of the World Heritage Committee held in Phnom Penh, Cambodia, Kumbhalgarh Fort, along with five other forts of Rajasthan, was declared a UNESCO World Heritage Site under the group Hill Forts of Rajasthan.

== Etymology ==
The name Kumbhalgarh derives from Rana Kumbha (r. 1433–1468), the Mewar ruler who commissioned the construction of the fort in the 15th century. The suffix "-garh" is a common Indo-Aryan term meaning "fort" (from Sanskrit gṛha or durga), hence "Kumbhalgarh" literally means "Kumbha's Fort". The region around the fort gradually adopted the same name due to the prominence of the structure and its founder.

== History ==
Rana Lakha won this entire area and plains of Godwar from Chauhan Rajputs of Nadol in late 14th century.

Kumbhalgarh fort was built by Mandan who was the chief architect of the Kingdom of Mewar. Rana Kumbha ordered for the construction of the fort in 1448 AD according to the Kumbhalgarh inscription. The fort served as Rana Kumbha's second most favoured capital. Rana Kumbha's kingdom of Mewar stretched from Ranthambore to Gwalior and included large tracts of what is now Madhya Pradesh and Rajasthan. Out of the 84 forts in his dominion, Rana Kumbha is said to have built 32 of them, of which Kumbhalgarh is the largest and most elaborate.

Ahmad Shah II of Gujarat attacked the fort in 1457, but found the effort futile. There was a local belief then that the Banmata deity in the fort protected it and hence he destroyed the temple. There were further attempts in 1458–59 and 1467 by Mahmud Khalji, but it also proved futile. Akbar's general, Shahbaz Khan, attacked this fort in October 1577 and after the siege of 6 months, he was able to capture the fort in April 1578. But it was recaptured by Maharana Pratap in 1583. In 1818, an armed band of sanyasis formed a garrison to protect the fort, but was convinced by James Tod and the fort was taken over by the British and later returned to Udaipur State. There were additions made by Maharanas of Mewar, but the original structure built by Maharana Kumbha remains. The residential buildings and temples are well-preserved. The fort is also known to be the birthplace of Maharana Pratap.

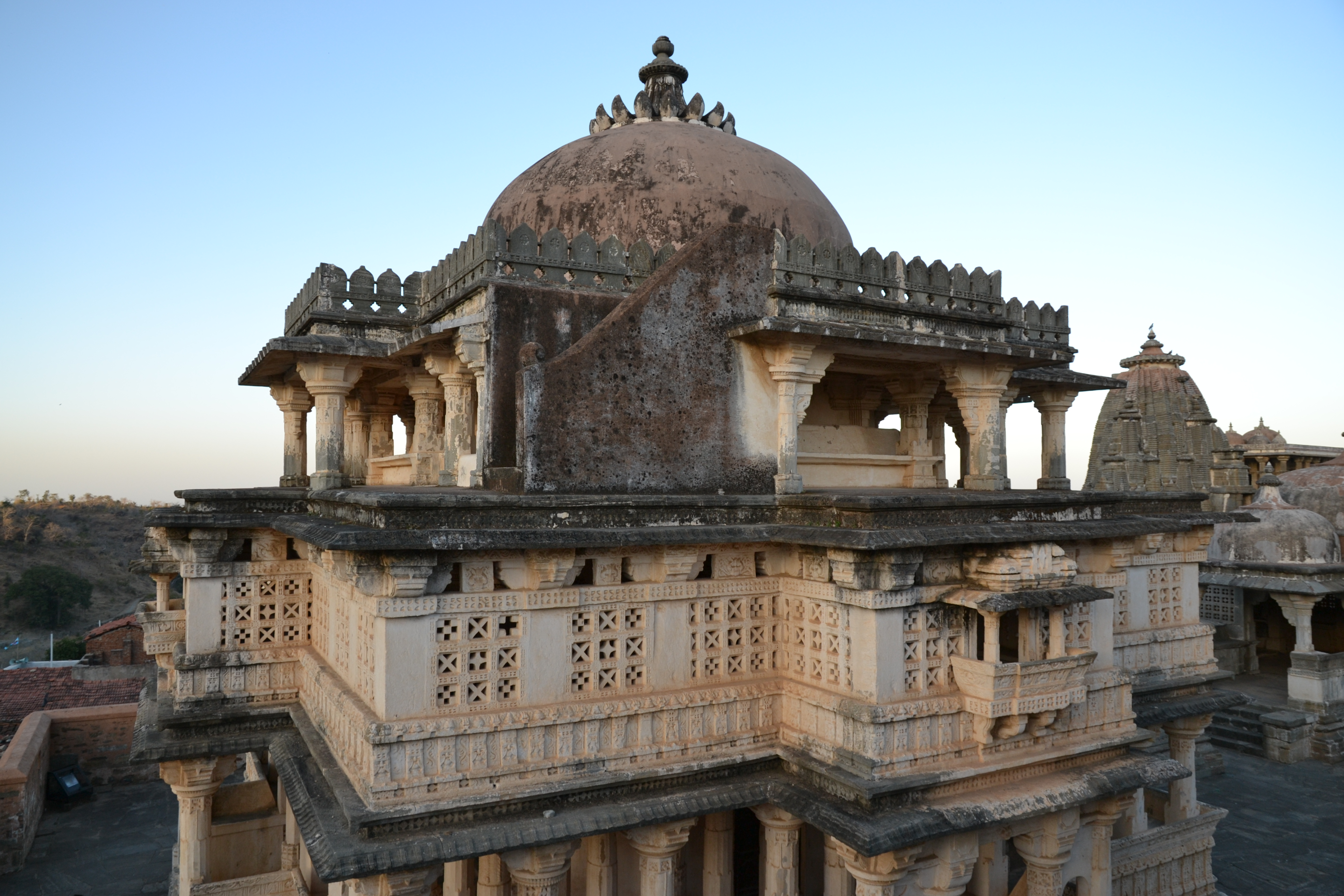
Vedi Temple

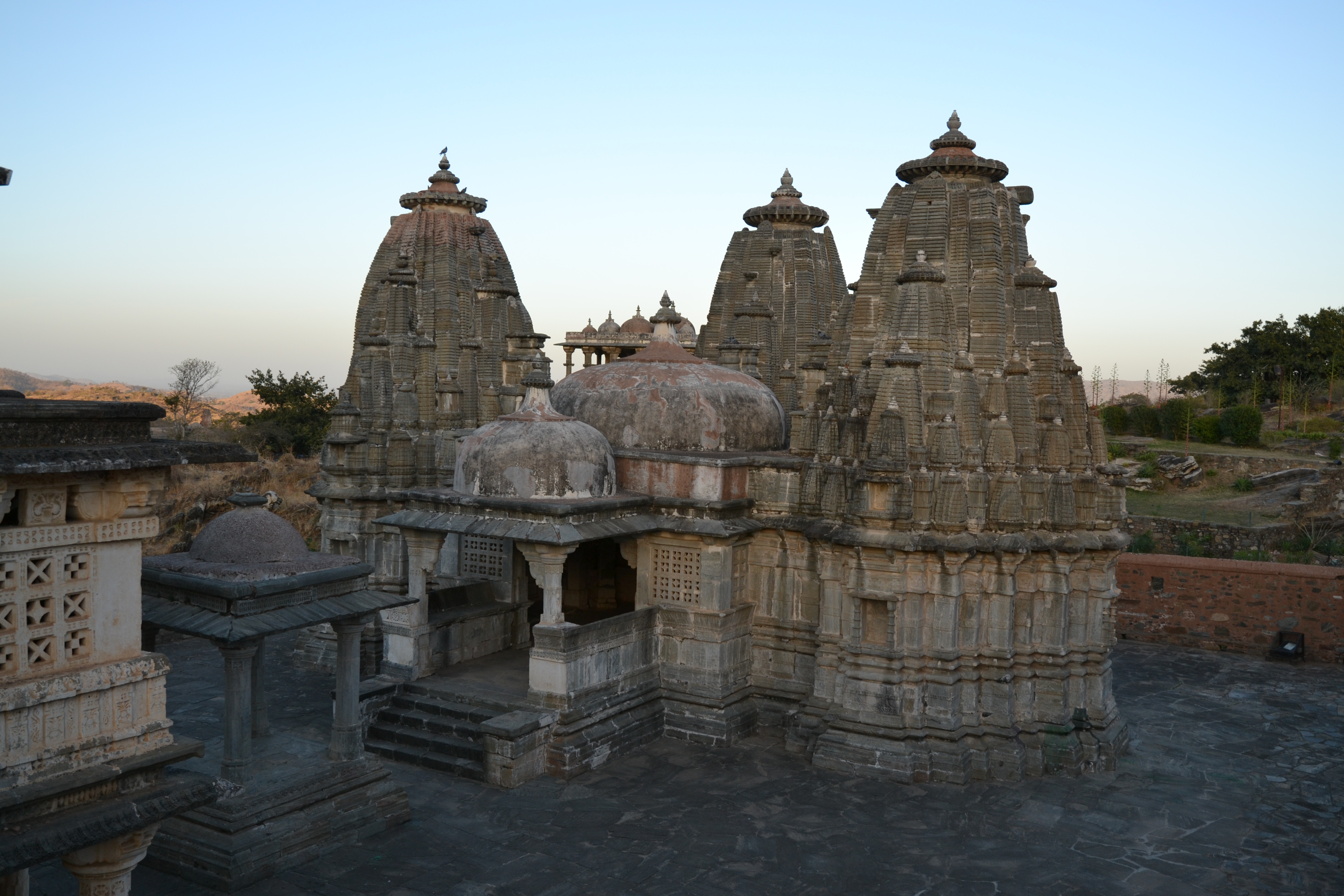
Trikuta Temple, dedicated to Brahma, Vishnu and Shiva

== Architecture ==
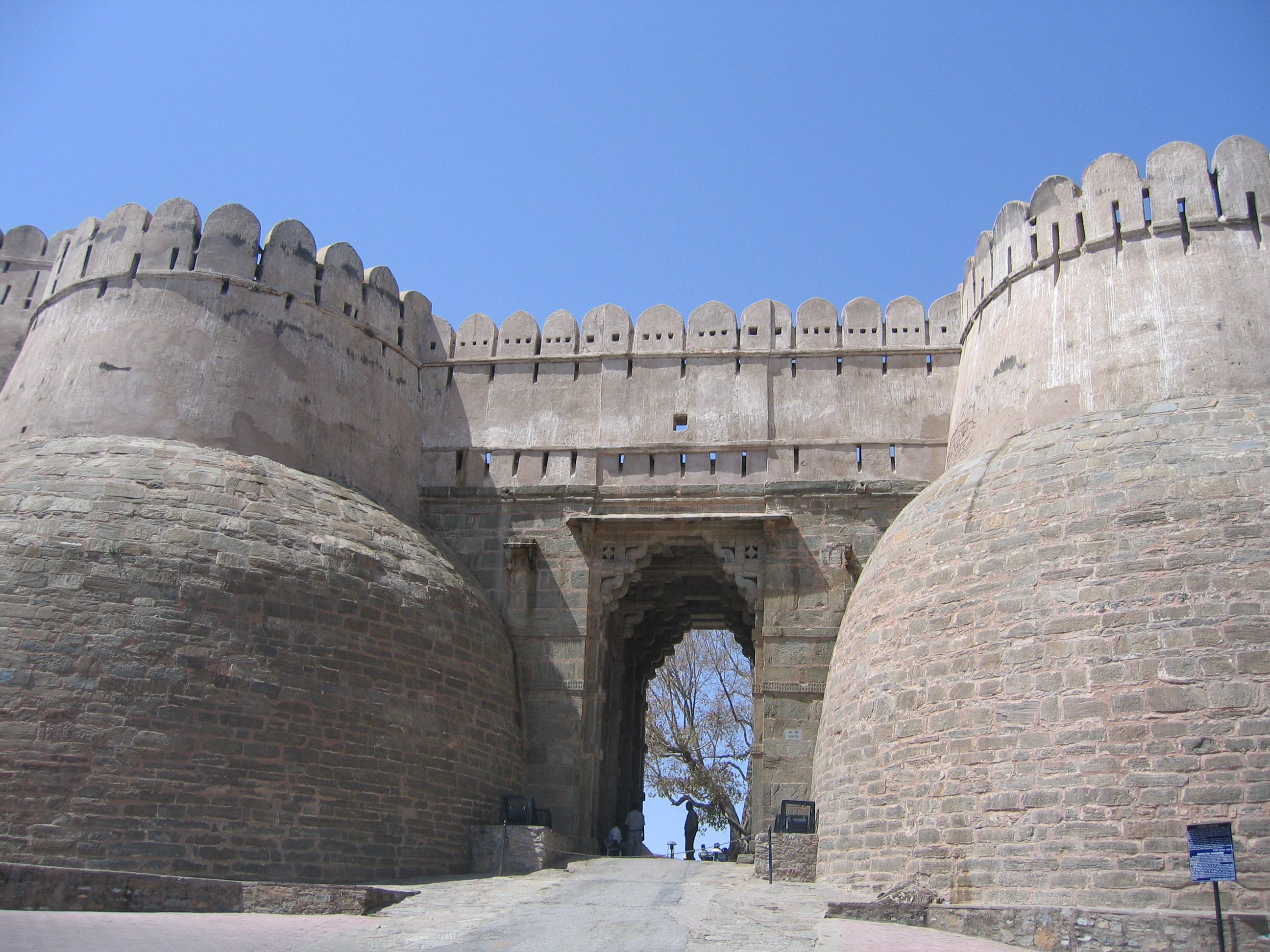
The massive gate of Kumbhalgarh fort, called the Ram Pol (Ram Gate)

The chief architect who built this fort was Mandan, who documented his style of work in his text, Rajvallabh. Built on a hilltop 1,100 m (3,600 ft) above sea level on the Aravalli range, the fort of Kumbhalgarh has perimeter walls that extend 36 km (22 mi), making it among the longest walls in the world. The frontal walls are 4.5 m (15 ft). Kumbhalgarh has seven fortified gateways. There are over 360 temples within the fort, both Jain and Hindu Temples. From the palace top, it is possible to see Kilometres into the Aravalli Range.

== Important structures in the fort ==
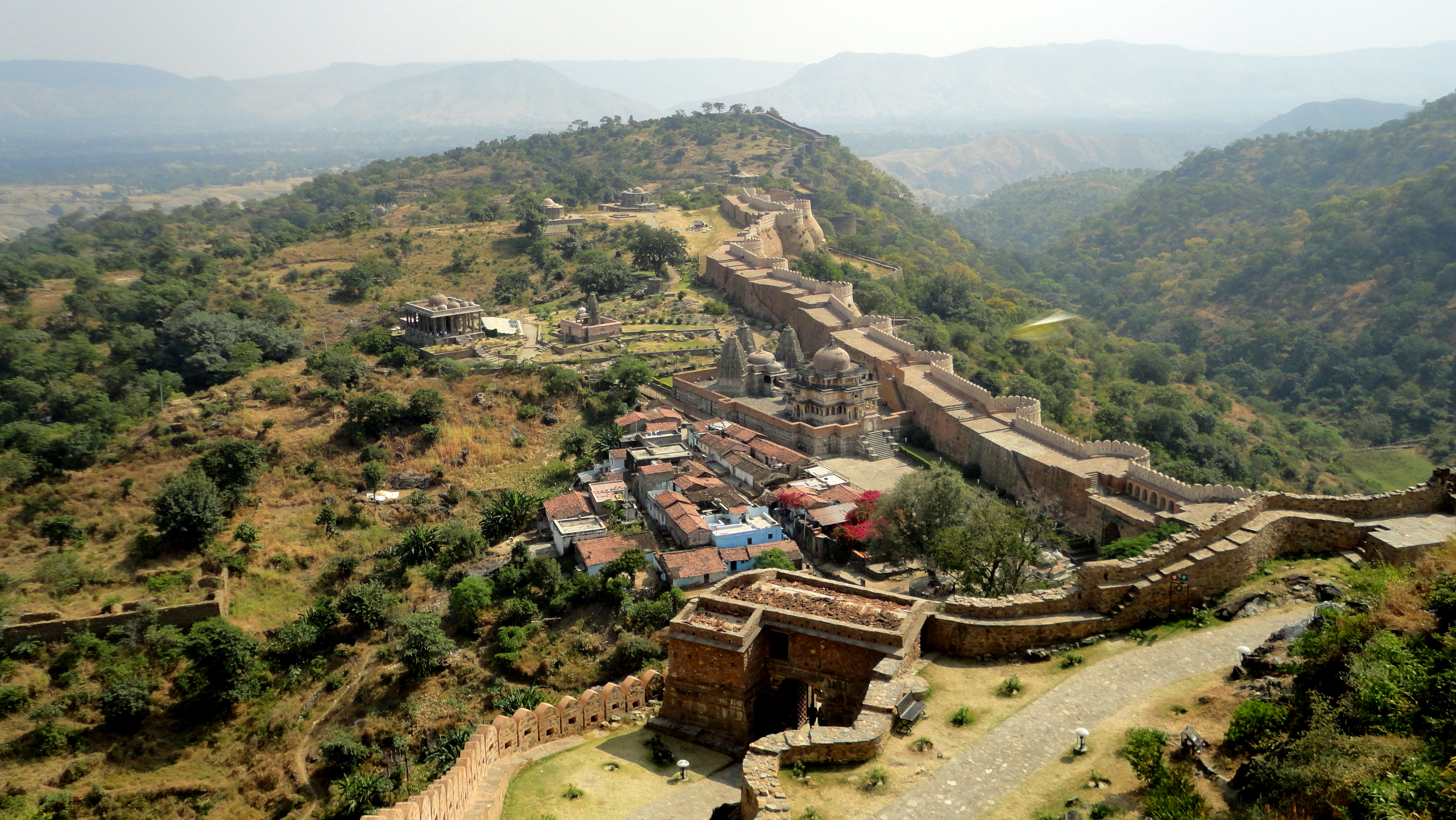
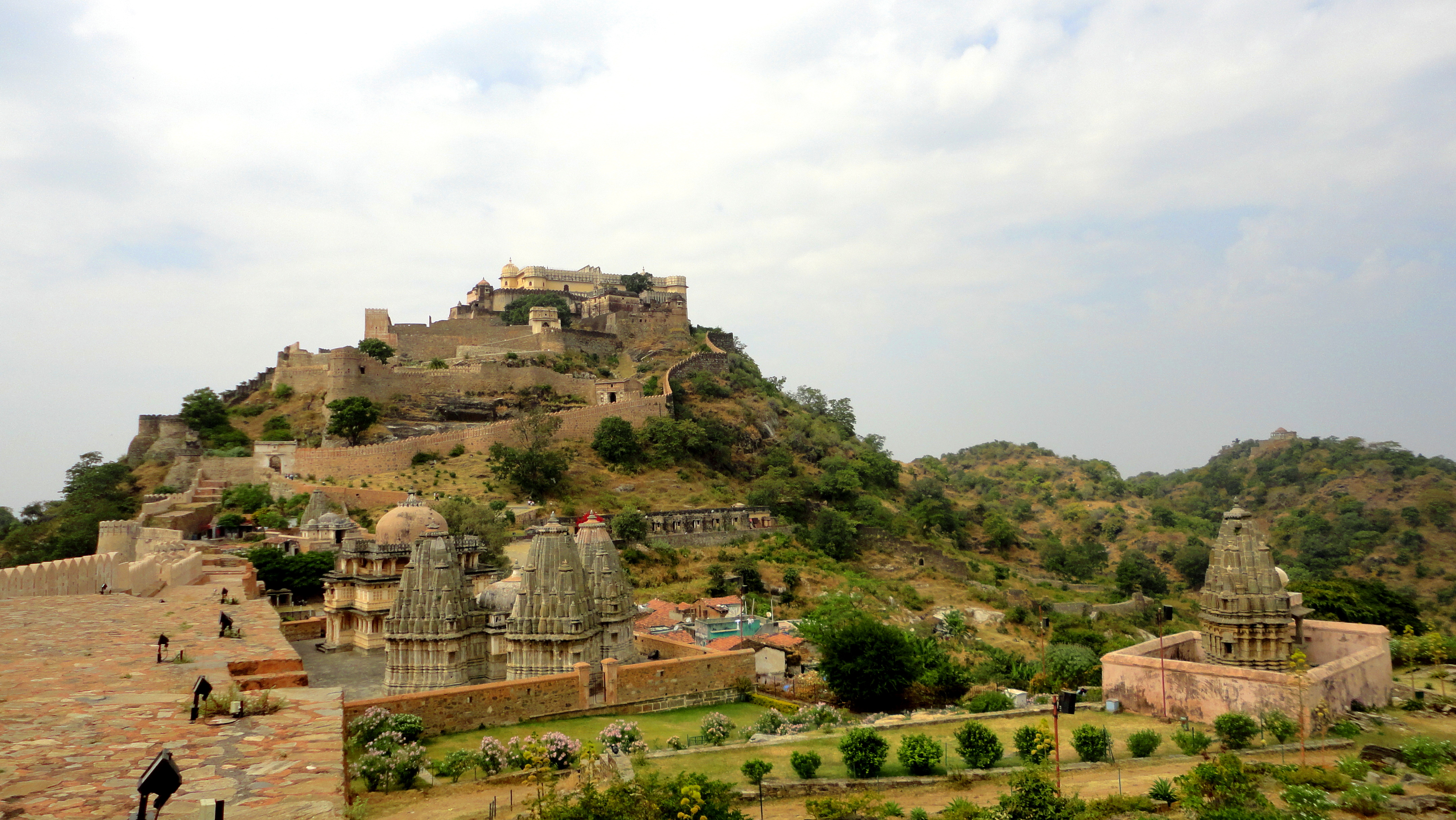
Aerial view of a portion of the Kumbhalgarh wall

Aaret Pol was the first entry gate of the fort. Halla Pol is on the downward slope from the entrance. Just after Halla Pol is Badshahi Bavdi, a stepped tank, built after the invasion of Shahbaz Khan in 1578, the general of Mughal emperor Akbar to provide water to the troops.

Hanuman Pol, the next gate is half a KM away from Halla Pol. Hanuman Pol is a double-storeyed gate with octagonal bastions. The gate got its name from the stone image of Hanuman located in front of the gate, which was brought by Maharana Kumbha.

Ram Pol is the main entrance of the fort, there is another entrance towards the east, called Vijay Pol.

There are five more gates between Ram Pol to Badal Mahal, the Palace built on the highest point of the fort. Names of these gates are Bhairon Pol, Nimboo Pol, Chaugan Pol, Pagda Pol and Ganesh Pol.

Hindu Temple

- Ganesha temple - Situated on the left of the Ram Pol, this temple was built by Maharana Kumbha and the image of Ganesha is enshrined in the sanctum. Standing on a high platform entered through a flight of steps from the south. The sanctum has decorated curvilinear brick sikhar while mandapa and mukhamandapa have a domical ceiling.
- Charbhuja temple - Dedicated to the four-armed goddess, this temple is just on the hill slope on the right side of Ganesha Temple. It is raised over a high platform and enclosed by a wall with an entrance from the east.
- Neel Kanth Mahadeva temple is located on the eastern side of the fort built during 1458 CE. The central shrine of Shiva is approached through a rectangular enclosure and through a structure supported by 24 huge pillars. The idol of Shiva is made of black stone and is depicted with 12 hands. The inscriptions indicate that the temple was renovated by Rana Sanga.
- Mataji temple, also called Kheda Devi temple is located on the southern side of Neela Kanth temple.
- There are 5 Hindu temples in Golera group of temples.
- Mamadeo temple. Cenotaph of Kunwar Prithviraj, elder brother of Rana Sanga is near to this temple.
- Surya Mandir (Sun temple)

Śvetāmbara Jain Temples

- Parsva Natha temple (built during 1513), Jain temple on the eastern side and Bawan (52) Jain temples.
- There are 4 Jain Temples in the Golera group of temples.
- 2 Jain Temples near Vijay Pol
- Juna Bhilwara Temple
- Pital Shah Jain temple
- Vedi Temple - A Jain Temple that was constructed by Rana Kumbha(1457AD).

== Culture ==
The Rajasthan Tourism Department organises a three-day annual festival in the fort in remembrance of the passion of Maharana Kumbha towards art and architecture. Sound and light shows are organised with the fort as the background. Various concerts and dance events are also organised to commemorate the function. The other events during the festival are Heritage Fort Walk, turban tying, tug-of war and mehendi mandana among others.

Six forts of Rajasthan, namely, Amber Fort, Chittor Fort, Gagron Fort, Jaisalmer Fort, Kumbhalgarh and Ranthambore Fort were included in the UNESCO World Heritage Site list during the 37th meeting of the World Heritage Committee in Phnom Penh during June 2013. They were recognized as a serial cultural property and examples of Rajput military hill architecture.

This fort (Kumbhalgarh) is previously described as The Fortress of Bowrie, in Rajpootana., as painted by William Westall with an engraving in Fisher's Drawing Room Scrap Book, 1836

== Gallery ==
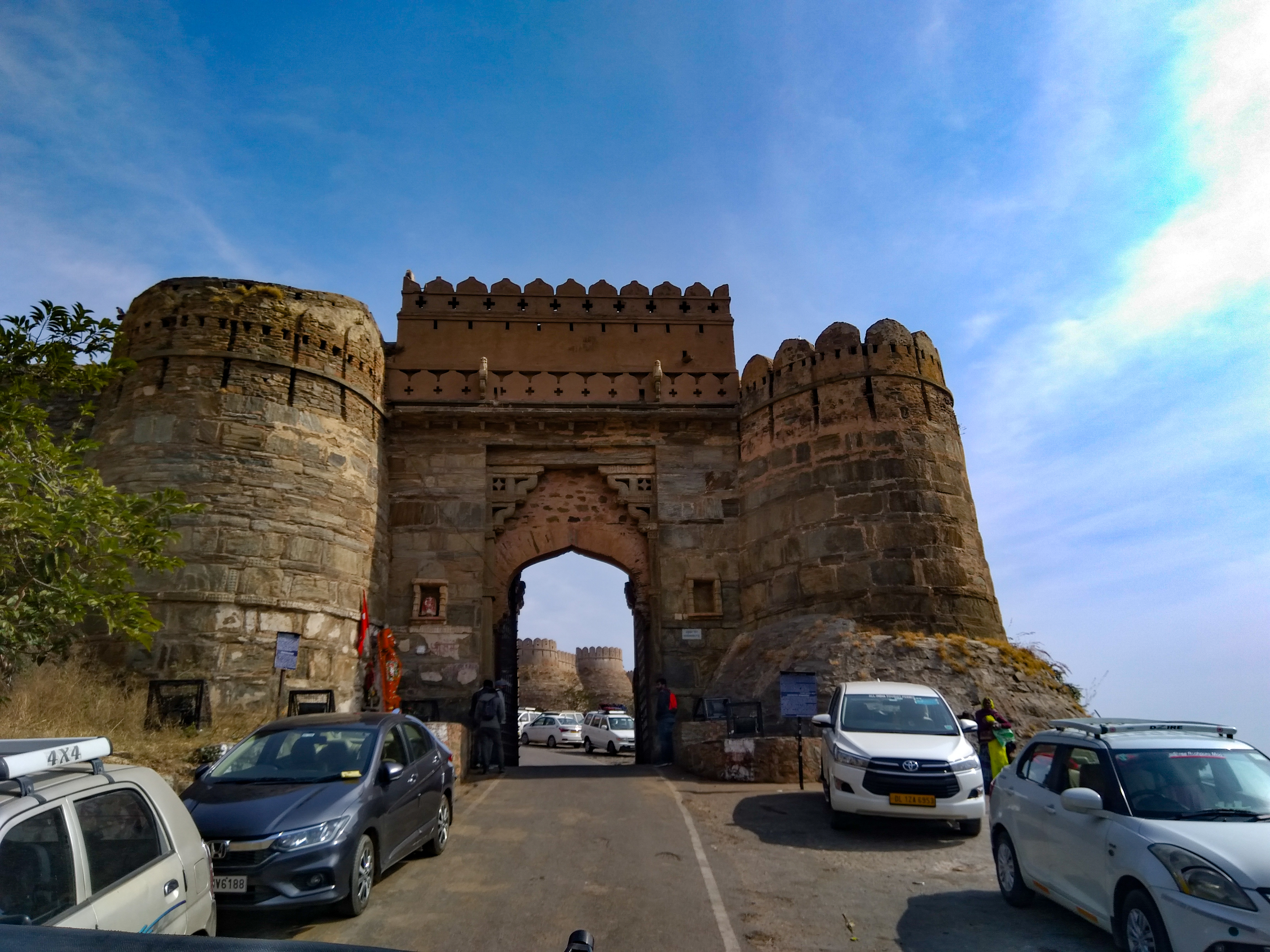
Fort Entrance

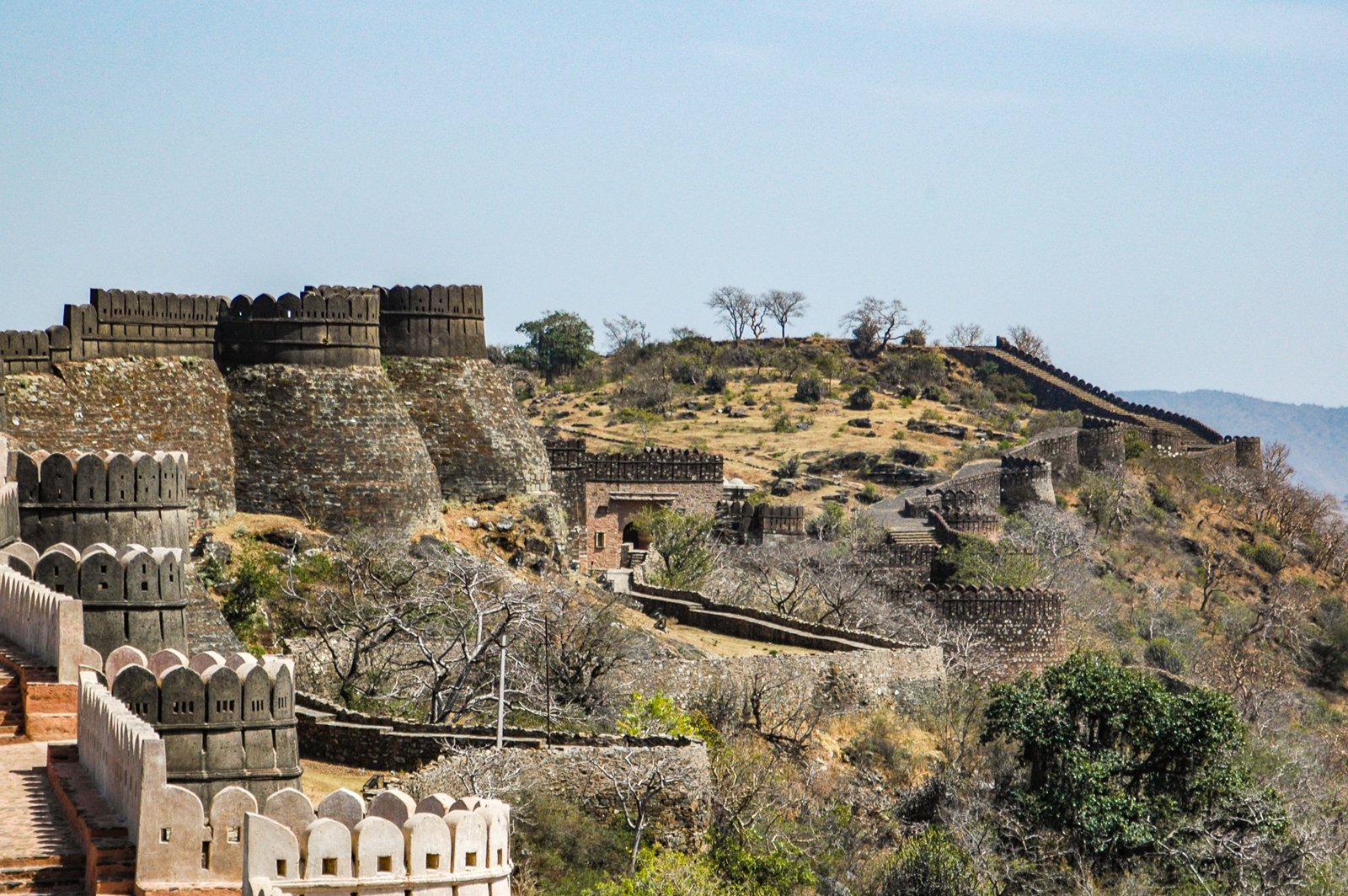
Wall of Kumbhalgarh

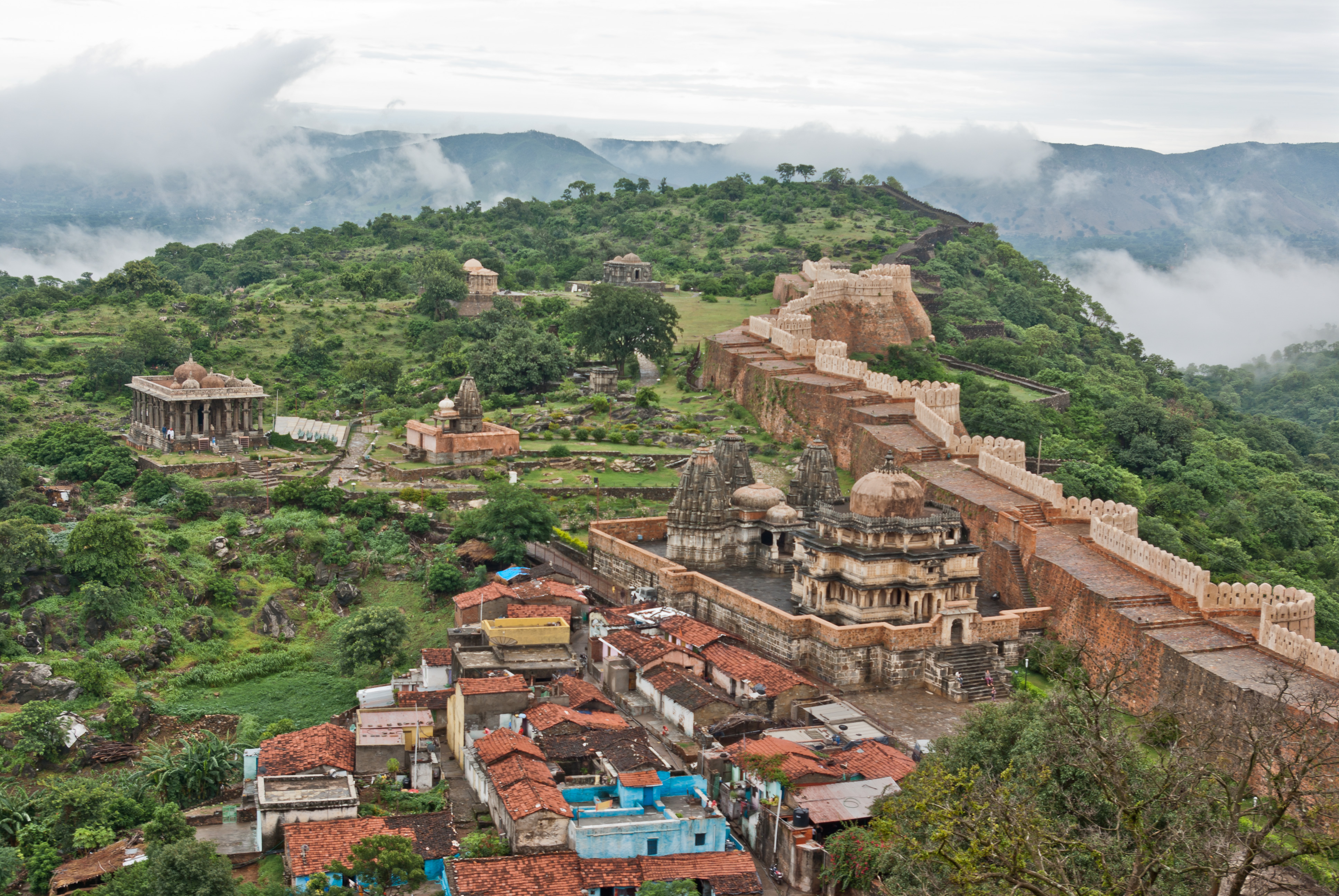
View from Fort

== See also ==
- Kumbhalgarh Wildlife Sanctuary
- Amber Fort
