= Battle of Mandalgarh and Banas =

1442 battles in India

The Battles of Mandalgarh and Banas were a series of battles fought between Maharana Kumbha of Mewar and Sultan Mahmud Khalji of Malwa. This offensive by the Malwa Sultan was aimed to punish the Maharana of Mewar for his adventures in Malwa up to the Battle of Sarangpur a few years earlier and to provide shelter to the rebel Umar Khan. After a series of engagements and skirmishes with Mandalgarh and Banas being the most deceives. The Sultan of Malwa called of his invasion. Both the Persian and Rajput chronicles hail these battles as their respective victory. However, historians had laid more emphasis on Rajput chronicles as Persian chronicles narrative of the Sultan's withdrawal due to the approach of the rainy season has been questioned by scholars. Historians have pointed out that the Sultan withdrew only due to the reverses he faced over the course of these campaigns.

== Battle of Mandalgarh ==
The Sultan came to Mewar via Kanthal. The invading army passed through numerous places and after placing a garrison there moved on. After some time they reached Machind and besieged the same. It was a hilly area and could only be accessed through a narrow passage which at any point proved too difficult for the invaders. Sultan then moved to Kelawara. He then ordered his army to plunder the place. Among numerous locations looted was the temple of Bana Mata which was ably defended by Deep Singh and his Rajputs who after days of fighting died and the temple was razed to the ground.

Meanwhile, Maharana Kumbha was able to muster a large army and led the opposing forces. Kelwara and Machind were re-garrisoned with more forces due to which the position of the Sultan became vulnerable. He divided his army into two to counter the Maharana as one among them was sent against the capital Chittorgarh. It was also done to check the Rajput reinforcement coming from there. However, the Same was done by the Maharana who sent Rajputs to plunder Malwa. Sultan tried to divert the attention of Rajputs by sending his forces to take Mandsaur only to be countered by the news that a strong force was already posted there by Maharana.

Continuous battles were going on between Rajputs and Muslims in which Sultan Mahmud's father was defeated and executed by Maharana which made the position of Sultan more vulnerable and he decided to leave Mewar making one of his officers in charge of the operations. Taking advantage of the situation Maharana made a sudden attack on the army of the Sultan with the strength of 10,000 cavalry and 23,000 infantry. Medieval historian Feristah puts this number to 10,000 cavalry and 6,000 infantry. The Sultan was however able to face the attack and made the same on the latter. However, enough damage was dealt to the Sultan who decided to call off his invasion and return to his capital Mandu leaving the aim of victory over Mewar for the next year. As Persian chronicles puts the rainy season was approaching.

Historians like R.V Somani, U.N Day, and G.N Sharma have agreed that the excuse of the Sultan to ward off due to rains or any other was not feasible as rainy season in Mewar starts from July not April. He had two months of May and June to achieve his motives. Aside of that he was also not able to capture Kelawara and Machind. That implies that he only retreated because he was worsened in the fight and was unsuccessful. On his part, Maharana Kumbha was not able to post a decisive victory either by taking the Rajput armies into the territory of the Malwa Sultanate.

== Battle of Banas ==
To retrieve from this disaster, Mahmud set about preparing another army, and four years later, on 11-12 October 1446 A.D., from Gagron. He started for Mandalgarh and encamped on the banks of the river Banas. Maharana Kumbha attacked him while he was crossing the Banas River, and the battle continued for three days. The Rajputs at last compelled the Sultan to retreat.

Persian Chronicles again states that talk of peace overtures happened between both sides, and the sultan was paid a ransom. The above account is full of exaggerations, as Mandalgarh at that point in time was covered with dense vegetation, which was hard to bypass. Another Persian text states that Sultan retreated due to rainy seasons, which is not true, as fighting continued for three days only. Overall, Sultan found out that he could not succeed and he retreated to the pretence of Rain, which could be dealt with as a defeat.
