= Gagron Fort =

Fort in Jhalawar, Rajasthan, India

- Rajasthan, India
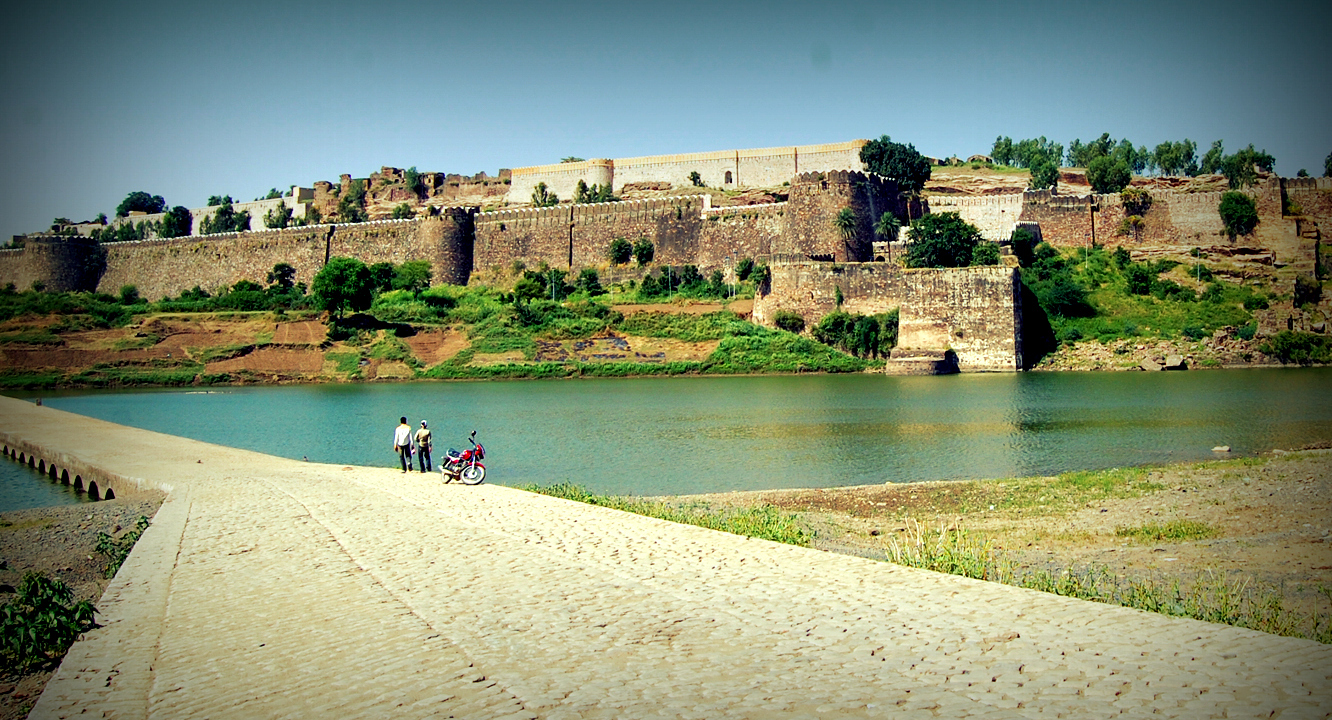
- Gagron Fort

Location
- Location within Rajasthan
- Coordinates: 24.627937°N 76.182957°E

Site history
- Battles/wars: Capture of Gagron (1444) – Mahmud Khalji defeated Khichi Rajputs and Rajputs of Mewar; Battle of Gagron (1519) – Rana Sanga defeated Mahmud Khilji II of Malwa

UNESCO World Heritage Site
- Type: Cultural
- Criteria: ii, iii
- Designated: 2013 (36th session)
- Part of: Hill Forts of Rajasthan
- Reference no.: 247
- Region: South Asia

Gagron Fort (Hindi/Rajasthani: गागरोन का किला) is a hill and water fort and is situated in Jhalawar district of Rajasthan, in the Hadoti region of India. It is located just 5 km from Jhalawar city, the district headquarter. It is an example of a hill and water fort. Raja Madho Bhil laid the foundation of Gagron Fort, after him this fort came under the control of Bijaldev Singh Dod (a Panwar Rajput king) in the twelfth century. Later, the fort has also been controlled by Sher Shah and Akbar. The fort is constructed on the confluence of Ahu River and Kali Sindh River. The fort is surrounded by water on three sides and a moat on the forth side and hence earned the name Jaladurg (Hindi/Rajasthani: जलदुर्ग, translation: Water Fort). At the 37th session of the World Heritage Committee at Phnom Penh, Cambodia, Gagron Fort, along with five other forts in Rajasthan, was declared as a UNESCO World Heritage Site in 2013 as a part of Hill Forts in Rajasthan.

== History ==
Gagron fort was constructed during the twelfth century by the King Bijaldev Singh Dod a Parmar Rajput. and the fort was ruled by the Khinchi kingdom for 300 years. The exact date on which the fort was constructed remains a mystery, but historians estimate that parts of the fort was constructed between the seventh and fourteenth centuries.

The last ruler of this fort is reported to be King Achal Das Khinchi. Over the centuries, the muslim rulers of Malwa attacked Gagron Fort. Sultan Hoshang Shah attacked the fort in the year 1423 with an army that included 30,000 horsemen and 84 elephant riders. Achal Das Khinchi, despite realising that his defeat was inevitable due to the Sultan's superior numbers and higher grade weapons, did not surrender and fought till he lost his life, in accordance with the Rajput tradition. Furthermore, many women committed jauhar, burnt themselves alive in order to avoid being taken captive by the Sultan's forces. The fort has reportedly seen 14 battles and 2 jauhars of queens.

The fort has also been conquered by Sher Shah and Akbar. Akbar also reportedly made this fort a headquarter and later gave it to Prathviraj of Bikaner as a part of his estate.

== Structures ==
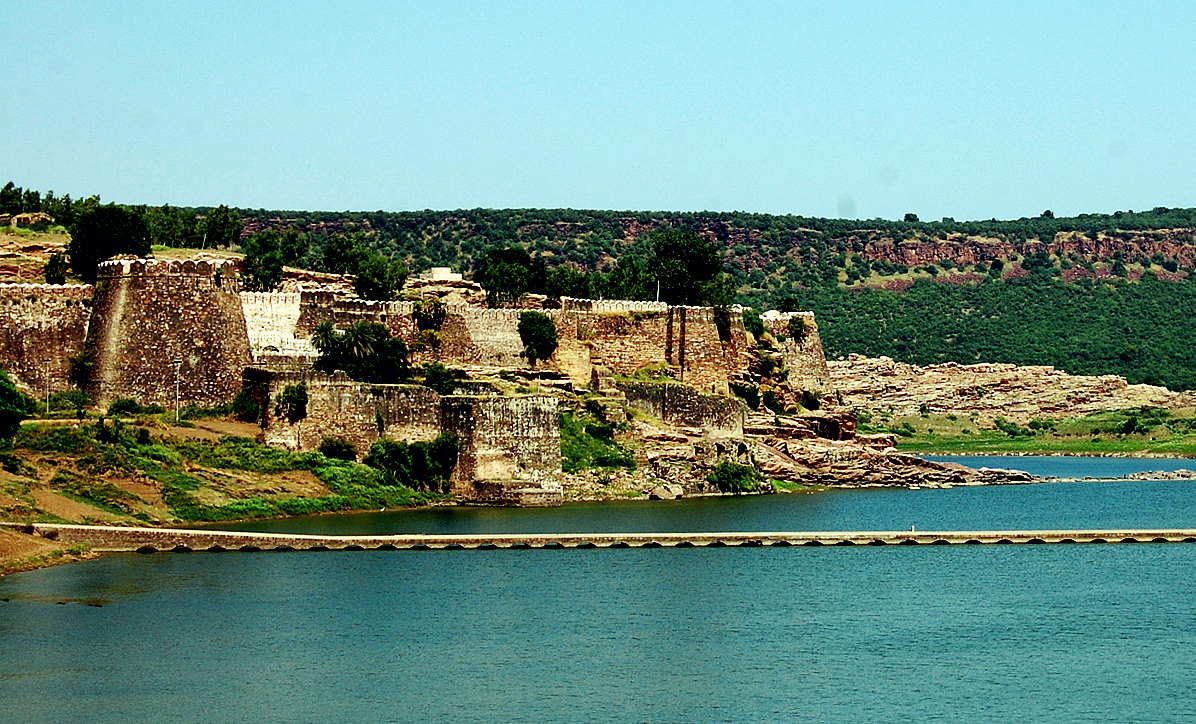
Gagron fort, the only fort in North India surrounded by water

Gagron Fort is surrounded by water on three sides and a moat filled with water on the fourth side. It is constructed on the confluence of Ahu River and Kali Sindh River. The fort also boasts three ramparts as opposed to traditional forts that have only two. The towers of the fort are blended with Mukundara Hills of the Vindhya Range. The mountain that the fort sits on is itself the foundation of the fort. The fort also has two main entrances. One gate leads towards the river, while the other gate leads towards the hilly road.

The following are some important sites of the fort:

- Ganesh Pol
- Nakkarkhana
- Bhairavi Pol
- Kishan Pole
- Selekhana
- Dewan-i-Aam
- Diwan-e-Khas
- Janaana Mahal
- Madhusudan Mandir
- Rang Mahal

The fort is the only fort in North India surrounded by water and has been named the Jaladurga (Water Fort) of India. A mausoleum of Sufi Saint Mitthe Shah just outside the fort is the venue for an annual colourful fair held during the month of Muharram. There is also a monastery of Saint Pipaji across the confluence.

== Conservation ==
Six Hill forts of Rajasthan, namely, Amer Fort, Chittor Fort, Gagron Fort, Jaisalmer Fort, Kumbhalgarh and Ranthambore Fort were included in the UNESCO World Heritage Site list during the 37th meeting of the World Heritage Committee in Phnom Penh during June 2013. They were recognized as a serial cultural property and examples of Rajput military hill architecture.
