= Visalpur =

Visalpur Visalpur
- Village
- Nickname: Visalpur Gam
- Location in Gujarat, India Visalpur (India)
- Coordinates: 22.9134754°N 72.494093°E
- Country: India
- State: Gujarat
- District: Ahmedabad

Government
  - Type: Gram Panchayat
  - Body: Gram Panchayat

Population (2011)
  - Total: 4,508

Languages
  - Official: Gujarati, Hindi, English
- Time zone: UTC+5:30 (IST)
- PIN: 382210
- Vehicle registration: GJ-1, GJ-27
- Website: gujaratindia.com

Visalpur is a village in Daskroi Taluka in Ahmedabad District of Gujarat State, India. Visalpur is located near the bank of the Sabarmati River, 17 km towards west from District headquarters Ahmedabad. 2 km from Daskroi. 43 km from State capital Gandhinagar. Visalpur Pin code is 382210 and postal head office is Sarkhej. As per constitution of India and Panchayati Raj Act, Visalpur village is administered by Sarpanch (Head of Village) who is elected by representative of village.
