= Ghiyath Shah =

Sultan of Malwa from 1469 to 1501

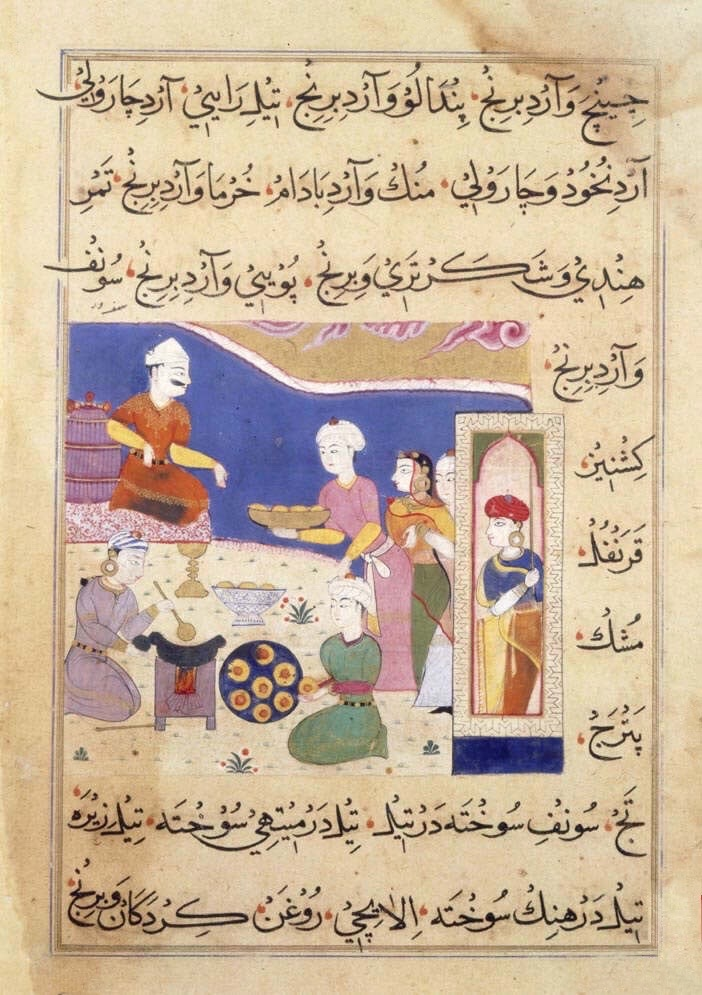
- Ghiyath Shah dining (from Nimatnama-i-Nasiruddin-Shahi)

5th Sultan of Malwa
- Reign: 1 June 1469 – 4 January 1501
- Predecessor: Mahmud Shah I
- Successor: Nasir-ud-Din Shah
- Born: 1421
- Died: 29 March 1501 (aged 79–80)

Ghiyath Shah (1421 – 29 March 1501), also known as Ghiyās al-Dīn Shāh or Ghiyasuddin, was the Sultan of the Malwa Sultanate from 1469 until his abdication in 1501. He was the son of his predecessor Mahmud Shah I. A military leader before his accession, he was known during his reign for his religious devotion and cultural life. During his reign, the Nimatnama-i-Nasiruddin-Shahi was written and illustrated. His exiled son Nasir-ud-Din Shah revolted and took the throne in October 1500. Ghiyath Shah formally abdicated the throne on 4 January 1501, and died on 29 March 1501, believed to have been poisoned by his son and successor.

== Biography ==
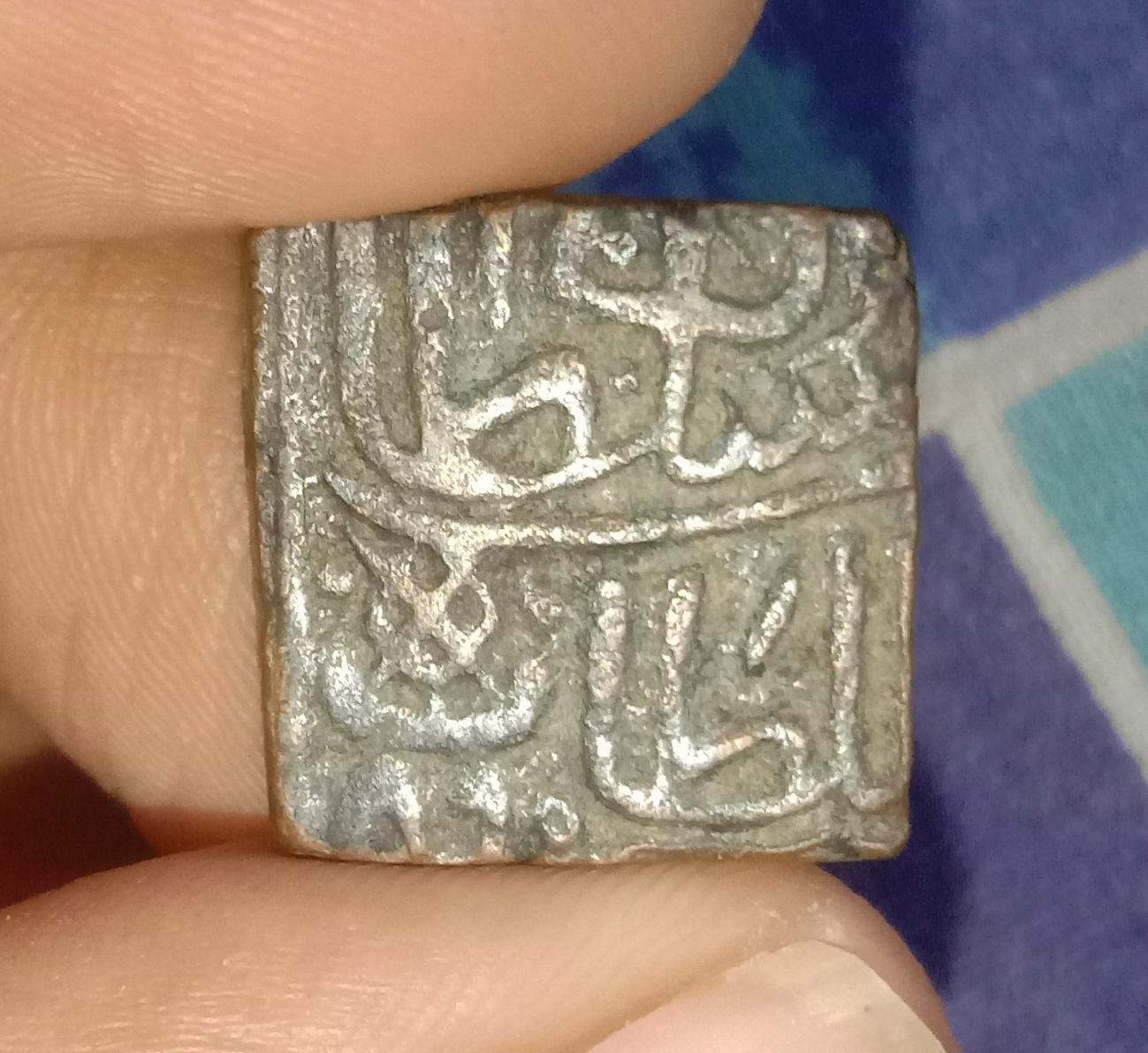
Copper Falus of Ghiyath Shah, Malwa Sultanate, struck in 80 Ratti standard.

The eldest son of Mahmud, Ghiyath served his father as a military leader. He was made Shah at the death of his father in 1469. According to Firishta, shortly after his accession, he held a grand feast at which he announced that after thirty-four years on the field he was yielding his military rule to his son. He was also known as Ghiyas-ud-Din Shah and Ghiyasuddin.

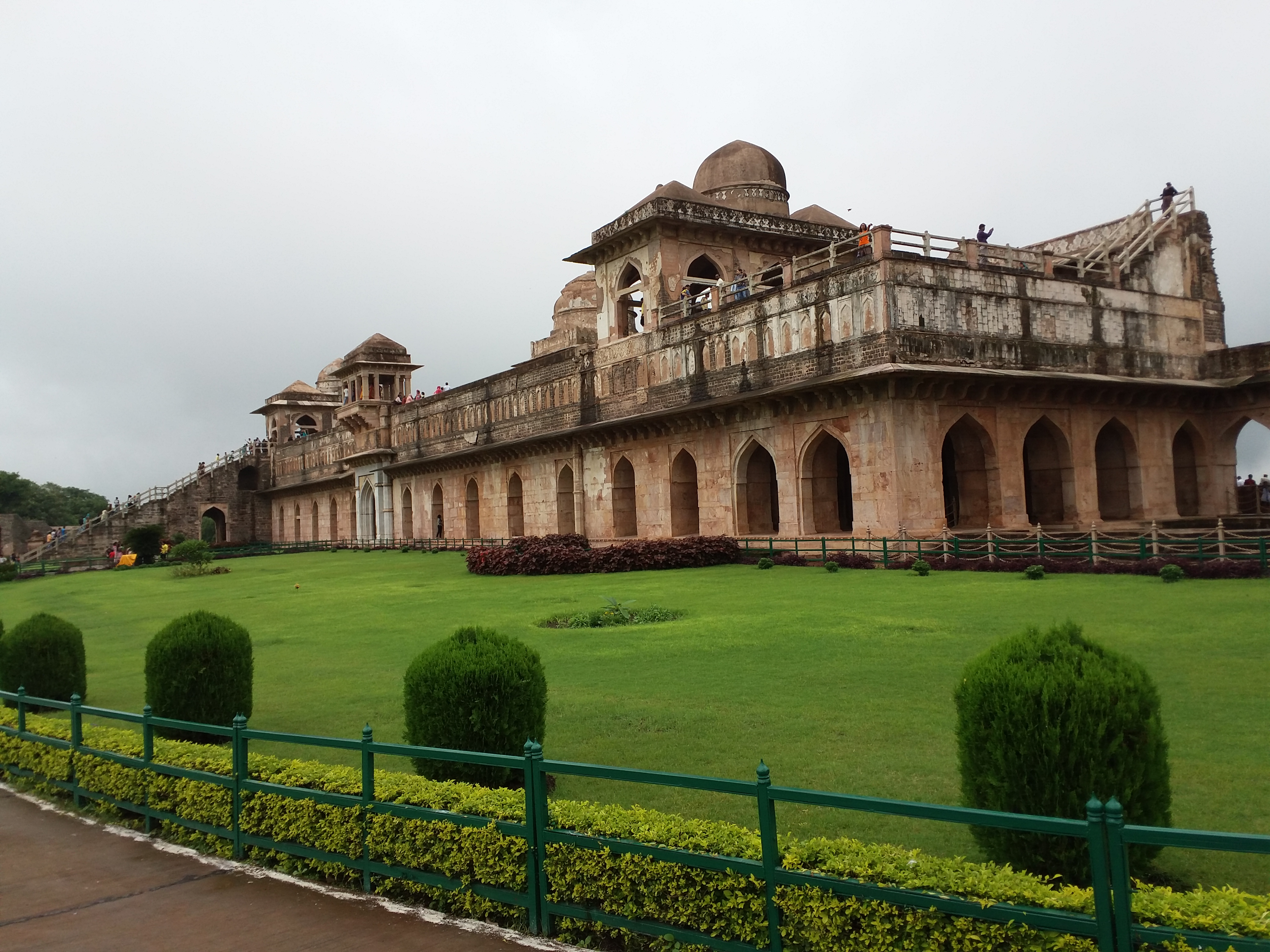
Jahaz Mahal, the palace of Ghiyasuddin

Ghiyasuddin then retired to a life away from the battlefield, constructing the palace of Jahaz Mahal, and created a court that was a place of culture. He was also known as an eccentric lover of art. For example, Nimatnama-i-Nasiruddin-Shahi (Book of Delights) is a cookery book produced between 1495 and 1505 for the sultan that is richly illustrated in a fusion of Persian and pre-Islamic Indian styles. The book contains fifty images, including the sultan, servants, landscapes and buildings as well as food preparation.

He was devoutly religious. He abstained from intoxicating drink and foods forbidden on religious grounds. According to Firishta, he gave instructions to his attendants that he should always be woken at the hour of prayer and that they were known to pull him out of bed while he was asleep. He was a follower of Moinuddin Chishti and is believed to have erected a 23-metre (75 ft) high ceremonial gateway named Buland Darwaza at the Ajmer Sharif Dargah in honour of the scholar.

Towards the end of his life, there was a conflict between his eldest son Nasir-ud-Din Shah, who had commanded the army, and his youngest son Ala-ud-Din. Nasir-ud-Din was chased from the capital Mando in 1499, but ultimately triumphed, returning to the palace on 22 October 1500. Nasir-ud-Din then executed his brother, along with his children and the rest of his family, and was formally crowned. Ghiyath Shah formally abdicated the throne on 4 January 1501, and died on 29 March 1501, widely believed to have been poisoned by his son and successor.

There were allegedly 12,000 women in Ghiyasuddin's court, including musicians, dancers and wrestlers. Ghiyath was interested in female education and set up a Madrasa in Sarangpur to teach the women of his court. Tutors were engaged to teach the royal princesses and over seventy women were well versed in the Quran.

== See also ==
- List of rulers of Malwa

Preceded by Mahmud Shah I	Sultan of Malwa; 1469–1500	Succeeded by Nasr Shah
