= Mandalgarh =

- Town
- Location in Rajasthan, India Mandalgarh (India)
- Coordinates: 25.2°N 75.1°E
- Country: India
- State: Rajasthan
- District: Bhilwara
- Elevation: 382 m (1,253 ft)

Population (2001)
  - Total: 13,844

Languages
  - Official: Hindi
- Time zone: UTC+5:30 (IST)
- PIN: 311604
- ISO 3166 code: RJ-IN

Mandalgarh is a town with municipality in Bhilwara district in the Indian state of Rajasthan. Pincode of Mandalgarh is 311604. It is the tehsil headquarters of Mandalgarh tehsil.

== History ==
The place was taken twice by Mahmud Khilji of Malwa in the middle of the fifteenth century, and subsequently appears to have belonged alternately to the Ranas of Mewar and the Mughal emperors. In or about 1650, Emperor Shah Jahan granted it in Jagir to Raja Roop Singh of Kishangarh, who partially built a palace there, but Rana Raj Singh retook it in 1660. Twenty years later, Emperor Aurangzeb captured the palace and in 1700 handed it over to Jhujar Singh Chief of Pisangan (now in Ajmer district) from whom it was captured by Rana Amar Singh in 1706, and it since then remained in the uninterrupted possession of his successors.

Mehta Agar Chand (Bachhawat), son of Mehta Prithviraj, then adviser to Maharana Ari Singh II since 1761, was also appointed as first Kiledar of Mandalgarh Fort in 1765, and the Purohit (Saraswat) Family started looking at the smooth administration of the fort and Charbhuja Temple. The patta signed and given by Maharana Ari Singh II (1761–73) of Mewar reads - "My order to Brother Mehta Agar Chand. The district of Mandalgarh has become rebellious, considering you to be our own person, we are sending you there. Try your best for the good of the Maharana and while trying for good, some wrong may be overlooked. Settle there with your family so long as Shri Eklingji's supremacy prevails, the district shall be yours. Build houses for your dwelling and try to win over people and farmers by granting them concessions. Manage the affairs of the fort with a strong hand." Mehta Agar Chand strengthened the fortifications by repairing, reconstructing and remodeling the outer walls of defense, and repairing the existing gates. Mehta Agar Chand, later served Mewar as Pradhan (1767–69 and 1796–99). Mandalgarh Fort remained under the Kiledaari of successive Bachhawat Mehtas till Independence of India in 1947.

To the North-West is a fort about half a mile in length with a low rampart wall and bastions encircling the crest of the hill on which it stands. The fort is said to have been constructed by a chief of the Balnote Clan of Rajputs (a branch of Solankis). There is an old temple, Jaleshwar by name (1619 v.s.). The fort also houses a temple dedicated to Shiva near Mandalgarh in a small village called Vitthalpura.

== Geography ==
Mandalgarh is located at 25.2°N 75.1°E. It has an average elevation of 382 metres (1253 feet).

== Demographics ==
As of 2001 India census, Mandalgarh had a population of 20,161. Males constitute 51% of the population and females 49%. Mandalgarh has an average literacy rate of 50%, lower than the national average of 59.5%, while male literacy is 63%, and female literacy is 36%. In Mandalgarh, 15% of the population is under 6 years of age.
