= Mahmud Khalji =

Sultan of Malwa from 1436 to 1469

- As-Sultan-ul A'zam 'Ala-ud-Dunya wa-Din Abul Muzaffar Mahmud Shah Khalji as Sultan; Sikandar-us-Sani; Yamin-ul-Khilafat Nasir-i-Amir-ul Mumnin
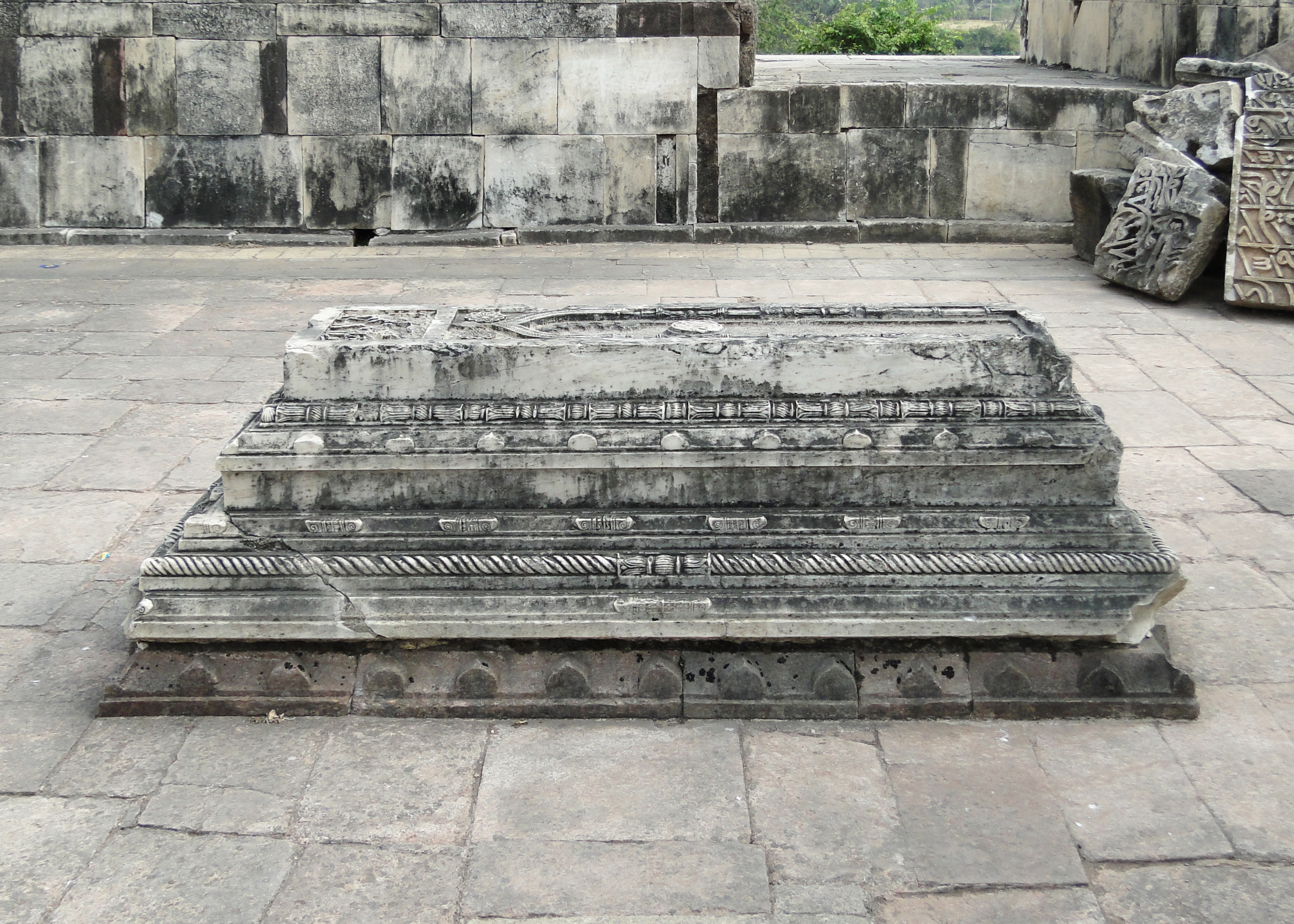
- Mahmud Khalji's Tomb in Mandu, Madhya Pradesh, India

4th Sultan of Malwa
- Reign: 14 May 1436 – 1 June 1469
- Predecessor: Masud Shah bin Muhammad Shah
- Successor: Ghiyas-ud-Din Shah
- Born: 8 May 1404
- Died: 1 June 1469 (aged 65); Malwa Sultanate
- Consort: A daughter of Hoshang Shah
- Issue: Ghiyas-ud-Din Shah; Fidan Khan; Taj Khan; Ahmad Khan
Names
- Ala-ud-Din Mahmud Shah Khilji
Regnal name
- Mahmud Shah I
- Dynasty: Khilji dynasty
- Father: Malik Mughlith

Mahmud Khalji (8 May 1404 – 1 June 1469), also known as Mahmud Khilji and Ala-ud-Din Mahmud Shah I, was the Sultan of Malwa, in present-day Madhya Pradesh, India. He ascended the throne in 1435 after assassinating Mohammad, the son of the previous ruler, Hoshang Shah. Mahmud Khalji launched an unsuccessful campaign against the Delhi Sultanate; however, under his reign, the Malwa Sultanate reached its greatest height.

== Early life and Ascension ==
Mahmud Khalji was distantly related to the Khalji dynasty of Delhi, as his great-great-great-great grandfather, Malik Nasiruddin, was a cousin of sultan Jalaluddin Khalji, and was given the iqta of Amroha as his jagir. Mahmud was also a grandnephew of Dilawar Khan, the first sultan of Malwa, through his sister. His father, Malik Mughlith, himself a nephew of Dilawar, played a key role in restoring Hushang Shah to the throne after it had been seized by Ahmad Shah I, for which he was granted the title Khan-i-Jahan. From an early age, Mahmud distinguished himself as a capable military commander, earning the title Khan from Hushang Shah in 1419 at the age of sixteen, who also gave him his daughter in marriage.

Following Hushang’s death, Mahmud supported the accession of his oldest surviving son, Ghazni Khan, who took the regnal name Muhammad Shah. However, relations between the two deteriorated, as Muhammad Shah grew increasingly suspicious and repeatedly demanded assurances of Mahmud’s loyalty. When Muhammad Shah allegedly began plotting his assassination, Mahmud pre-empted him by having him poisoned. Muhammad’s thirteen-year-old son, Masud, was briefly placed on the throne, but Mahmud soon attacked the palace, deposed the young ruler, and seized power for himself, ascending the throne on 14 May 1436. He assumed the regnal titles were As-Sultan-ul A'zam 'Ala-ud-Dunya wa-Din Abul Muzaffar Mahmud Shah Khalji as Sultan (transl. Exaltation of the World and the Faith, the Father of Victory), Sikandar-us-Sani (transl. Alexandar the second) and Yamin-ul-Khilafat Nasir-i-Amir-ul Mumnin (transl. Right Hand of the Caliphate and the Helper of the Commander of the Faithful).

== Wars of Mahmud Khalji ==
=== Battle of Mandalgarh and Banas (1442–1446) ===
A series of battles took place between Mahmud Khalji of Malwa and Rana Kumbha of Mewar between 1442 and 1446. Bloodied by these engagements, the Sultan did not launch another attack on Mewar for the next ten years.

=== Siege of Gagron (1444) ===
In February 1444, Sultan Mahmud Khalji besieged the fort of Gagron, which was under the control of Palhan Singh Khichi. Rana Kumbha had sent reinforcements under his commander Dahir, but Dahir was killed in battle. Palhan Singh was slain by Mahmud's forces while attempting to flee the fort.

=== Battle of Mandalgarh (1457) ===
Sultan Mahmud Khalji launched an attack on Mandalgarh, deploying seven detachments to engage Rana Kumbha from multiple directions. However, the Malwa forces under Taj Khan and Ali Khan suffered heavy losses. Following the defeat, Mahmud retreated the next morning.

=== Siege of Mandalgarh (1456–1457) ===
In December 1456, Rana Kumbha was compelled to move north to confront the Sultan of Gujarat. Taking advantage of his absence, Sultan Mahmud Khalji attacked Mandalgarh once again. After a prolonged siege, he successfully captured the fort in October 1457.

=== Conquest of Mandalgarh (1457) ===
The conquest of Mandalgarh was a significant military expedition led by Sultan Mahmud Khalji against Mewar. The primary objective of this campaign was to capture the fort of Mandalgarh, which was under the command of Uparamal, a subordinate of Rana Kumbha. Mahmud Khalji marched towards Mewar in 1457 and successfully captured the fort.

== Rule ==
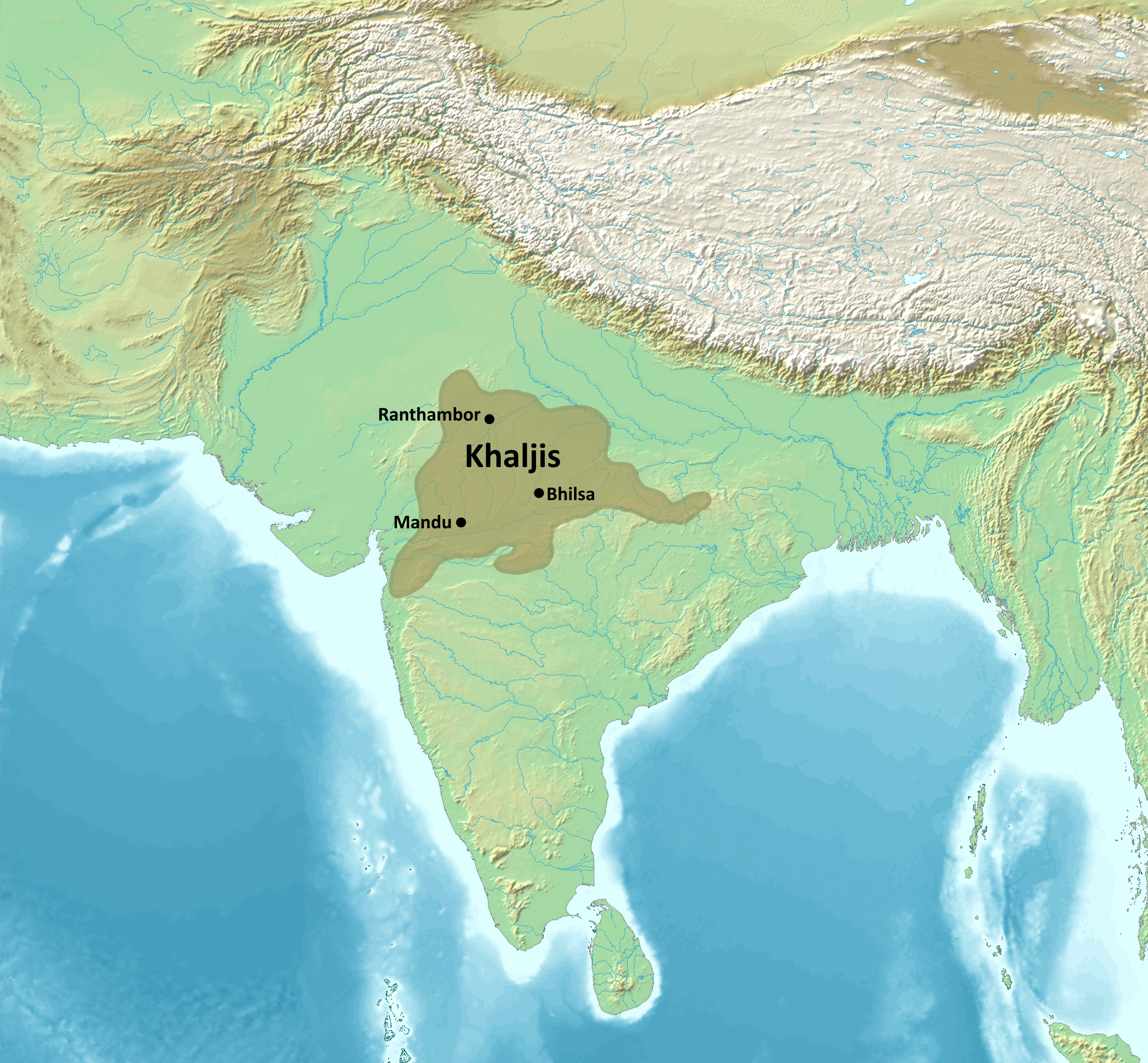
Map of the Khaljis of Malwa at their height

During the reign of Muhammad Shah II of the Gujarat Sultanate, Mahmud Khilji of Malwa invaded Gujarat. After capturing and securing Champaner, he advanced towards Gujarat with an army of 80,000 cavalry. However, before he could proceed further, Muhammad Shah II died and was succeeded by Qutb-ud-Din Ahmad Shah II.

Mahmud Khilji laid siege to Sultanpur, where Malik Ala-ud-Din bin Sohrab, the commander of Kutb-ud-Din, surrendered the fort. In recognition of his service, he was sent to Malwa with honour and appointed as the governor of Mandu. Mahmud Khilji then marched to Sarsa-Paldi and summoned Bharuch, which was under the command of Sidi Marjan on behalf of the Gujarat Sultanate. However, Sidi Marjan refused to surrender. Fearing further delays, Mahmud Khilji plundered Baroda (now Vadodara) before proceeding to Nadiad. There, he was astonished by the bravery of the local Brahmins, who managed to kill a rampaging elephant.

Ahmad Shah II soon advanced to confront Mahmud Khilji, and the two armies clashed at Kapadvanj. After a prolonged and uncertain battle lasting several hours, Kutb-ud-Din emerged victorious, forcing Mahmud Khilji to retreat. Muzaffar Khan, who had allegedly incited Mahmud Khilji to invade Gujarat, was captured and beheaded. His severed head was displayed at the gate of Kapadvanj as a warning to others.

In the same year, Sultan Mahmud Khalji attempted to conquer Nagore, which was then held by Firuz Khan, a cousin of the Gujarat Sultan. In response, Ahmad Shah II dispatched an army under the command of Sayyid Ataullah. As the Gujarat forces approached Sambhar, Mahmud Khalji retreated. Shortly thereafter, Firuz Khan died.

== See also ==
- Vijaya Stambha

== Bibliography ==
- Day, Upendra Nath (1965). Medieval Malwa: A Political and Cultural History, 1401-1562. Munshi Ram Manohar Lal. ISBN 978-81-215-0401-0.
