= Idar war of succession (1515–1520) =

Gujarat–Mewar war over Idar (1515–1520)

- Part of Gujarat–Mewar Wars
Date	1515–1520
Location	Idar and surrounding territories, Gujarat 23.839°N 73.002°E
Result	Gujarat Sultanate victory
Territorial changes	Idar annexed by the Gujarat Sultanate Territorial changes: 1515: Mewar temporarily installed Raimal before Gujarat reinstalled Bharmal.; 1517: Raimal again briefly reoccupied Idar before being ousted by Gujarati forces.; 1520: Mewar occupation of Idar and reinstatement of Raimal before subsequent Gujarati recapture.

Belligerents
Kingdom of Mewar; Supported by: Kingdom of Marwar; Kingdom of Merta; Dungarpur State; Banswara State; Kolis of Idar	Gujarat Sultanate

Commanders and leaders
Rana Sanga; Rao Raimal; Rao Ganga; Rao Biramadeo; Rawal Udai Singh	Muzaffar Shah II; Rao Bharmal; Nizam-ul-Mulk (WIA); Kiwam-ul-Mulk; Zahir-ul-Mulk †; Nasrat-ul-Mulk; Malik Bakhan Ontheria †; Imad-ul-Mulk; Kaisar Khan; Khizr Khan; Asad Khan; Ghazi Khan; Shuja-ul-Mulk; Saif Khan

Strength
1520: 52,000 cavalry and infantry	1520: 1,200 cavalry 1,000 infantry Unknown musketeers

Casualties and losses
Heavy; 1520: 60 Kolis killed	Heavy

The Idar war of succession (1515–1520) was a series of military conflicts fought over the throne of the Rathore principality of Idar, located in present-day Gujarat, India. The succession struggle escalated into a major regional conflict between the Mewar Kingdom, led by Rana Sanga, and the Gujarat Sultanate under Sultan Muzaffar Shah II.

The dispute began in 1515 following the death of Rao Bhim, when his son Bharmal assumed power. Bharmal's uncle, Raimal, challenged his right to rule. Seeking to expand his regional influence and place his son-in-law on the throne, Rana Sanga intervened on Raimal's behalf. Backed by a united coalition of Rajput forces, Sanga installed Raimal to Idar. Bharmal sought refuge with Muzaffar Shah II, who rejected Mewar's encroachment on Sultanate authority. Muzaffar Shah II sent forces under Nizam-ul-Mulk, successfully reinstating Bharmal. Raimal was fleed in the Visnagar hills.

In 1517, Raimal raided Patan and sacked Gilwara, killing the newly appointed commander Zahir-ul-Mulk in battle. In response, the Sultan dispatched Nasrat-ul-Mulk, who contained Raimal's raids and placed Idar under direct imperial control, allowing Bharmal limited autonomy in exchange for tribute.

In 1520, following a personal insult by the newly appointed governor Mubariz-ul-Mulk, Rana Sanga invaded Gujarat with a massive force of 52,000 troops. Sanga successfully captured Idar and reinstated Raimal before proceeding to Ahmadnagar. Shortly after the Rajput coalition withdrew, Kiwam-ul-Mulk and Mubariz-ul-Mulk launched a successful counter-offensive, defeating the remaining Rajput and Koli defenders. Idar was brought under the firm control of the Gujarat Sultanate.

== Background ==
The Rathore Rajputs of Idar were subdued by the Sultans of Gujarat. The tributary state often tried to overthrow Muslim authority in Gujarat. In 1445, Har Rao also known as Rao Bhan, the chief of Idar, unable to withstand invasion, married off his daughter to Sultan Muhammad Shah II. The marriage formed an alliance between the two states. Accordingly, Muhammad Shah left Idar undisturbed since Har Rao was his father-in-law. His successors, Ahmad Shah II and Mahmud Begada likewise maintaining friendly relations with Idar. Rao Bhan died in 1509, leaving behind his two sons, Surajmal and Bhim. Surajmal the eldest son only reigned for eighteen months. His son Raimal succeeded the throne but was ousted by his uncle Bhim who declared himself as sovereign. Raimal fled to the court of Rana Sanga and married his daughter. Bhim decided to stop paying the usual tribute payments unlike his predecessor. When Sultan Mahmud died and Muzaffar ascended the throne in 1511, he saw a great chance to revolt against the Sultanate. In 1513, Bhim rebelled and raided the areas east of the Sabarmati River. Ain-ul-Mulk, the governor of Patan, marched to stop the raids. Rao Bhim assembled a massive army and defeated the governor, killing his brother, Abdul-Mulk. After heavy losses, Ain-ul-Mulk was forced to retreat to Patan. Sultan Muzaffar paused his planned campaign in Malwa and marched straight to Modasa to punish the rebellious Idar chief. Terrified by the Sultan's sudden advance, Rao Bhim fled into the hills and abandoned his capital. The Gujarati army captured Idar destroying its temples, buildings, and surrounding countryside. Left with no choice, the Rao negotiated a peace deal through Malik Gopi, a Hindu minister in Gujarat. Rao Bhim agreed to pay twenty lakh tankas and one hundred elephants as tribute. Sultan Muzaffar accepted the payment as he was about to lead campaign into Malwa. Rao Bhim maintained peaceful relations with the Sultan.

== Succession crisis (1515–1517) ==
In 1515, Rao Bhim died and was succeeded by his son Bharmal. However, Bharmal's uncle Raimal challenged his right to rule. Wanting to put his own son-in-law in power, Rana Sanga stepped into the dispute and backed Raimal's claim to the throne of Idar. He sent a powerful army to place his candidate, which triggered a full-scale civil war in Idar between Bharmal and his uncle Raimal. Rana Sanga reached out to Maharawal Udai Singh of Dungarpur for assistance. This led to a united army from Dungarpur, Gewar (24.505209°N 72.656774°E), and Marwar invaded Idar. Bharmal vacated, fleeing to the court of Muzaffar Shah. He sought help from the Sultan. Raimal was successfully enthroned as the new ruler. Refusing to allow Rana Sanga to exert influence over a domain under his authority, Muzaffar Shah agreed to help Bharmal take back his land. Sultan Muzaffar sent Nizam-ul-Mulk, the governor of Ahmadnagar, with a sizeable army to put Bharmal back in power. Unable to withstand the Gujarati forces, Raimal abandoned the capital, allowing Nizam-ul-Mulk to easily seat Bharmal on the throne. Nizam-ul-Mulk violated the order by over chasing Raimal into the Visnagar hills. The manoeuvre backfired, resulting in significant casualties for the Gujarati troops. Consequently, Muzaffar Shah summoned Nizam-ul-Mulk back and scolded him for disobeying orders.

In 1517 Nizam-ul-Mulk left Zahir-ul-Mulk in charge of Idar and retired to Muhammadabad-Champaner to rest. Seeing an opportunity, Raimal advanced down from the hills raided across the Patan districts as far as sacking Gilwara. Zahir-ul-Mulk tried to stop the raids but was killed in battle. To restore order, Sultan Muzaffar Shah quickly dispatched Nasrat-ul-Mulk as the new governor. Nasrat-ul-Mulk successfully contained Raimal's incursions. Idar was now placed under direct imperial control, stationing a heavy military presence and his own officers. While Bharmal was permitted limited autonomy, he was required to pay a steady tribute, bringing the region under firm Sultanate authority.

== Mewar capture of Idar (1520) ==
Muzaffar Shah appointed Nizam-ul-Mulk titled Mubariz-ul-Mulk as the governor of Idar. A minstrel once told that no monarch in Northern India could match Rana Sanga. He further said that Sanga's intervention would ultimately secure the throne of Idar for Raimal, its rightful claimant. Outraged by these words, Mubariz-ul-Mulk insolently replied, "what sort of a dog is the Rana, and how can he protect Raimal? Here I sit why does he not come?". He ordered a dog to be named Sanga and chained at the gate of the fort. The minstrel reported to the Rana. Rana Sanga being enraged decided to punish the governor of Idar. In 1520, Rana Sanga marched with a force of 40,000 cavalry and infantry. Rao Ganga of Marwar and Rao Biramadeo of Merta joined him with their contingents of 7,000 and 5,000 cavalry respectively. When the joint forces reached the outskirts of Vagad, Rawal Udai Singh of the Dungarpur State, came out to assist Rana Sanga in this expedition. According to Firishta, the Rawal Udai Singh owed allegiance to the Sultan of Gujarat. He switched to Rajput side. The chief of Banswara State also joined with his forces. Thus, Rana Sanga's total strength peaked at 52,000 cavalry and infantry for Idar expedition. The Gujarati forces at Idar numbered only about 5,000. Many of them had gone to Ahmedabad. Unable to resist Rana Sanga's advance, Governor Mubariz-ul-Mulk urgently requested reinforcements from Sultan Muzaffar Shah. Some ministers, jealous of Mubariz-ul-Mulk's appointment as governor, maliciously concealed the messages to fail him. Although Mubariz-ul-Mulk wished to fight, his officers persuaded him to evacuate Idar and retreat to Ahmadnagar to hold its fort. 100 Silahdars (cavalry) under Malik Bakhan Ontheria refused to leave and stayed behind. On the way, Mubariz-ul-Mulk met Khizr Khan, Asad Khan, Ghazi Khan, Shuja-ul-Mulk and Saif Khan, who were arriving with reinforcements. In the meantime, Rana Sanga had already captured Idar. The Gujarati commanders therefore continued to Ahmadnagar. The remaining Silahdars under Malik Bakhan were quickly defeated, and all were killed. Rana Sanga after defeating the band of soldiers, occupied Idar. He reinstated his son-in-law Raimal on the throne. He demolished a mosque and built a Hindu temple in its place. Several local chiefs and zamindars voluntarily submitted to him.

== Gujarat recapture of Idar (1520) ==
After Rana Sanga's departure to Chittor, Kiwam-ul-Mulk and Mubariz-ul-Mulk advanced on Ahmadnagar, where Rajput forces backed by the Kolis blocked their way into the town. The Gujarati army defeated and scattered the defenders; roughly 60 Kolis were killed in the battle. Sixteen days later Mubariz-ul-Mulk entered the fort and carried out the funeral rites for the previously slain soldiers at the battle of Ahmednagar. Shortage of supplies soon forced him to withdraw to Parantij. Sultan Muzaffar ordered Imad-ul-Mulk and Kaisar Khan to reinforce the position, yet a severe famine compelled them to turn back as well. Unwilling to lose so important a place, the Sultan commanded his officers to hold Ahmadnagar through the rains whatever the cost, promising to lead a personal campaign against Rana Sanga once the monsoon ended. With these measures Muzaffar Shah re-established his control over Ahmadnagar. Idar also fell under Muzaffar Shah's realm.

== Aftermath ==
In December 1520, Muzaffar II sent Malik Ayaz to punish Rana Sanga. Ayaz ravaged territories in Vagad, lastly besieging Mandasur. Internal jealousy among Gujarati nobles led the siege fail. Malik Ayaz returned with a peace treaty with Mewar but gained no tangible outcome. In 1522 Muzaffar prepared another campaign but cancelled it when Sanga's son arrived with gifts. During the period of Gujarati control over Idar, the Raos are reported to have resided at the village of Sarvan. Rao Bharmal soon recovered his capital and faced two attacks by Bahadur Shah, in 1528 and again in 1530. The later campaign compelled Bharmal to accept vassal status. Upon Bharmal's death in 1543, Punjaji succeeded him. Under Punjaji the power of the Gujarat sultans steadily weakened, allowing the Rao to assert independence. From about 1540 until 1572 the rulers of Idar remained free of tribute on the condition that they furnish a contingent of 2,000 cavalry.

== See also ==
- Battle of Ahmednagar
- Idar State
- List of wars of succession

== Bibliography ==
- Chaube, J. (1975). History of Gujarat Kingdom, 1458-1537. Munshiram Manoharlal Publishers. ISBN 978-0-88386-573-6.
- Rajyaghor, S. B. (1974). Gazetteers: Sabarkantha District. Directorate of Government Print., Stationery and Publications.
- Somani, Ramavallabha (1976). History of Mewar, from Earliest Times to 1751 A.D. Mateshwari Publications.
- Commissariat, M. S. (1938). A History of Gujarat. Vol. I. Ahmadabad: Longmans Green & Co. Ltd.
- Habib, Mohammad; Nizami, Khaliq Ahmad (1970). A Comprehensive History of India. Vol. 5, Part 2. People's Publishing House.
- Haig, W. (1928). The Cambridge History of India: Turks and Afghans, edited by W. Haig. Vol. III. Cambridge University Press.

History of Gujarat
