= Siege of Mandu (1518) =

1518 conflict in Malwa

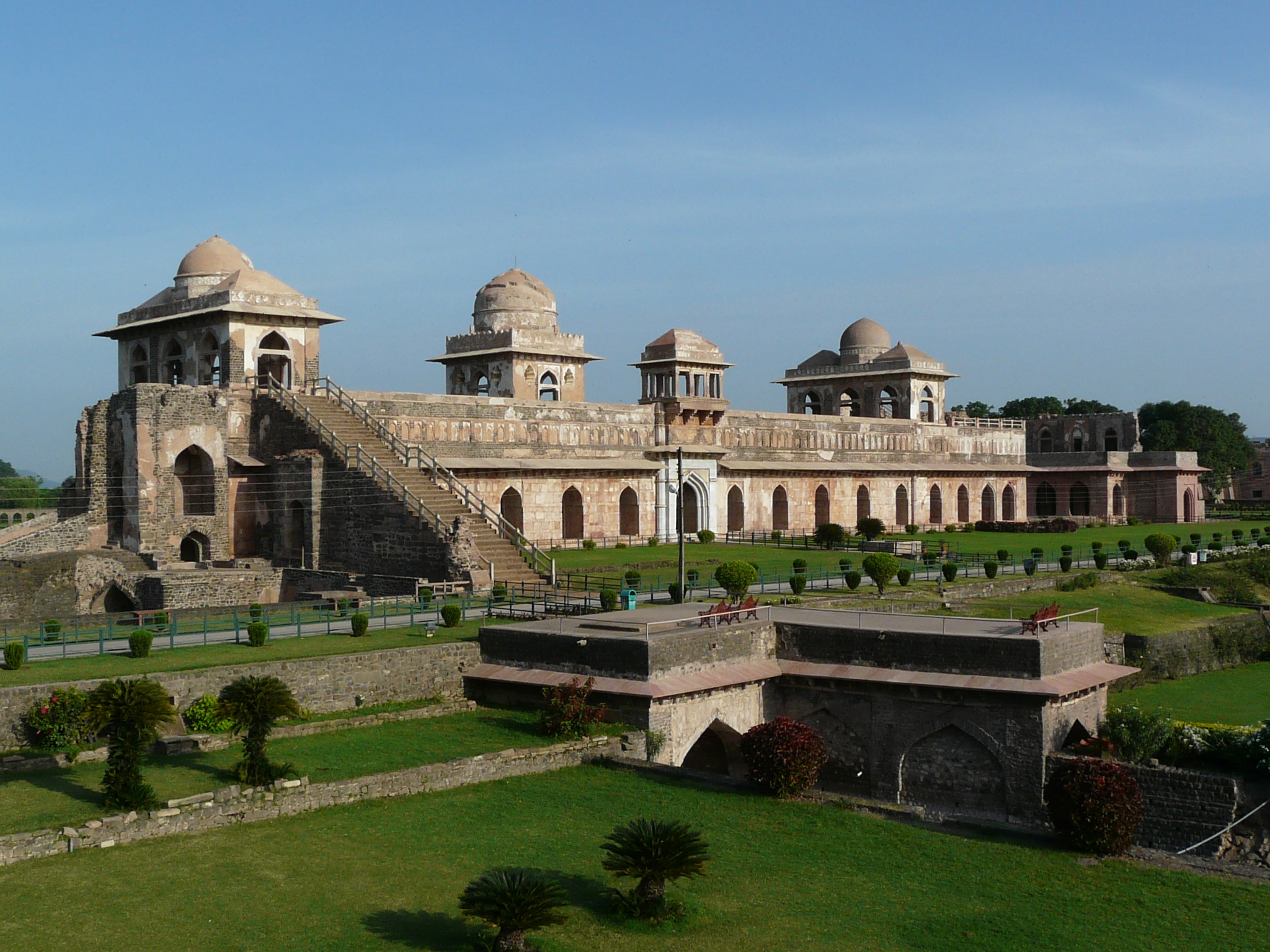
- Jahaz Mahal inside the fort of Mandu
Date	6 January – 23 February 1518 (1 month, 2 weeks and 3 days)
Location	Mandu, Malwa Sultanate 22°21′26.2″N 75°23′34.2″E
Result	Gujarat Sultanate victory
Territorial changes	Mandu captured by the Gujarat Sultanate

Belligerents
Gujarat Sultanate; Malwa Sultanate; Khandesh Sultanate	Purbiya Rajputs

Commanders and leaders
Muzaffar Shah II; Mahmud Khalji II; Adil Khan III; Bahadur Khan; Latif Khan; Khudawand Khan; Kaiser Khan; Imad-ul-Mulk; Kiwan-ul-Mulk; Asaf Khan	Rai Pithaura † Commanders: Ugrasen Purbia; Bhim Karan; Badan (DOW); Udai Karan †; Sadi Khan †; Bahadur Khan †; Dungar Singh †; Bikram Singh †; Kahan Deo †; Horal Deo †; Jamar Deo †; Sangam Deo †; Ujanat Deo †; Ghazi Khan †; Ratan Chand †; Manak Chand †; Daulat Khan †; Yak Lakhi †; Akhi Chand †; Kirat Chand †; Kaku †; Malkhan †; Rai Jangju †; Pathan Pila †; Jit Singh †; Fath Khan †; Kakah †; Pahan †; Sons of Sher Khan †; Sons of Jagar Sen †; Hemkaran Purbia (WIA)

Strength
Gujarat: 20,000; Malwa: Unknown; Khandesh: Unknown	approx. 40,000

Casualties and losses
Gujarat: 10,000	Total 40,000 Rajputs were killed, including 19,000 soldiers with 57 sardars, while the remainder perished in jauhar.
- Location within Madhya Pradesh Siege of Mandu (India)

The Siege of Mandu (6 January to 23 February 1518) was a military engagement at Mandu (present-day Madhya Pradesh, India) the capital of the Malwa Sultanate. The conflict was fought between the combined armies of the Gujarat Sultanate under Muzaffar Shah II, supported by Mahmud Khalji II of the Malwa Sultanate and Adil Khan III of the Khandesh Sultanate, against the Purbiya Rajputs of Medini Rai.

During the reign of Mahmud Khalji II, his Wazir Medini Rai and his Purbiya Rajputs gained huge power and administrative positions. Reducing the Sultan to a nominal ruler, Medini Rai governed Malwa as its de facto ruler. The Rajputs became increasingly insubordinate. Willing to establish his authority, Mahmud Khalji came into hostilities with Medini Rai. After armed conflicts broke out with the Rajputs, Mahmud Khalji fled Mandu in late 1517 to seek military assistance from Muzaffar Shah II of Gujarat. Muzaffar Shah seized the opportunity to assert Gujarat's influence over Malwa. He marched a large army to Mandu, besieging the fortress in early January 1518. The defending garrison was placed under the command of Medini Rai's son, Rai Pithaura, while Medini Rai travelled to Chittor to request military aid from Rana Sanga of Mewar. Rai Pithaura initiated peace negotiations to buy some time for reinforcement. However, upon learning of Rana Sanga's movement in Ujjain, Muzaffar Shah renewed an intensified siege of the citadel. The Gujarati troops breached the fortress through a secret route during the Hindu festival of Holi. On 23 February 1518, the fort of Mandu was captured. The Rajput women performed jauhar, and the remaining garrison fought to the death in a final stand.

The siege resulted in a decisive victory for Muzaffar Shah. Rajput casualties numbered 40,000, including Rai Pithaura and numerous leaders. Following the capture of the fortress, Muzaffar Shah II restored Mahmud Khalji II to the throne of Malwa. He left a garrison of 10,000 Gujarati soldiers under Asaf Khan in the capital, effectively reducing the Malwa Sultanate to a dependency of Gujarat.

== Background ==
Sultan Mahmud Khalji II relied heavily on Wazir Medini Rai and his Purbiya Rajput forces. Medini Rai dismissed distrusted Muslim nobles and replaced them with his own followers. He consolidated power by placing loyalists in key court positions. Nizamuddin Ahmad says that many Muslim nobles left Mandu since the land of Shaikhs had turned into land of kafirs. During the Sultan's absence Ali Khan, governor of Mandu, seized the fort in protest. Mahmud captured the city and executed him, further isolating the Sultan from the Muslim nobility. Sultan Mahmud Khalji were just a puppet while Medini Rai became de facto ruler of Malwa. Rather than seizing the throne directly which would trigger neighbouring Muslim states of Gujarat, Khandesh, and the Deccan into uniting against a Rajput dynasty in Malwa, Medini Rai chose to govern as an uncrowned ruler with total power. The arrogant Rajputs took Muslim women into their household. They neglected showing proper respect to the Sultan even violating the royal harem. Thus, Mahmud Khalji grew increasingly uneasy with the growing dominance of the Rajputs in the capital. He wanted to get rid of them without open warfare. Sultan Mahmud imposed three demands: restoring Muslim officers, ending Rajput interference in state affairs, and removing Muslim women from Rajput households. Medini Rai agreed, but his assistant, Salibahan, openly defied the Sultan. Mahmud then conspired to eliminate both leaders. Ambushed at the palace, Salibahan was killed, but a wounded Medini Rai escaped. Enraged Rajputs led by Medini Rai's son attacked the palace, but Mahmud repelled the assault, killing the son. Despite his injury and loss, Medini Rai restrained his followers, reaffirming his loyalty to the Sultan. To pacify Medini Rai, Mahmud allowed him a personal guard of 500-armed Rajputs. However, Medini Rai's constant armed escort left the Sultan fearful of his wazir's revenge. He remained in permanent suspicion. Mahmud Khalji decided to seek help of Muzaffar Shah II of Gujarat.

== Prelude ==
From the very beginning of his reign, Muzaffar Shah II wanted to assert Gujarat's dominance and establish its authority over Malwa. In 1517 AD, Sultan Mahmud fled Mandu for Gujarat to seek assistance to overthrow the Rajputs from Malwa. Muzaffar Shah II seized this opportunity. To escape Mandu, Mahmud planned to evade the Rajput bodyguards assigned to him by Medini Rai. Mahmud systematically exhausted these guards running them during the day while hunting. He secretly slipped at night accompanied only by his queen, Rani Kanakar, and guided by loyal Krishna. Following a tiring journey lasting half a night and a full day, Mahmud successfully reached Bhakor. There, Kaiser Khan the Muqta of Dahod received him. On 18 November 1517, Muzaffar Shah II set out on his campaign from Muhammadabad with Sikandar Khan, Latif Khan and Bahadur Khan. On 25 November, he reached Godhra and sent back Sikandar Khan to look after Ahmedabad. On 11 December, the Gujarati forces pitched their tents at Bhakor. Resuming the march Muzaffar Shah reached Deola and set up camp on 28 December. The following day, on 29 December, he personally welcomed Mahmud Khalji. Medini Rai upon learning that Muzaffar Shah and Mahmud Khalji were advancing toward Dhar, began preparing the defence of the capital Mandu. He entrusted the fort of Mandu to the command of his son Rai Pithaura, who was assisted by Bhim Karan, Shadi Khan, Buddhan (Badan), and Ugrasen Purbiya. Medini Rai and Silhadi moved to Dhar with 2,000 Rajput cavalry and large number of elephants. On 1 January 1518, he moved to Ujjain.

== Siege ==
On 6 January 1518, Muzaffar Shah encamped near Mandu and laid siege to the fort. Observing the fort he ordered to dig trenches. The Rajputs launched a skirmish in an attempted to disrupt the progress. They were defeated during an initial clash and retreated behind the fortress walls. The Gujarati forces maintained their operations. Muzaffar Shah placed Kaiser Khan in charge of the Delhi gate and Imad-ul-Mulk was given charge of the other gate. Thus, the fort was besieged on all sides. The Rajputs tried to ambush and kill Imad-ul-Mulk. Launching a sudden sally, the Rajputs charged the sector under his command. However, the cautious general defeated the garrison killing most of the attacking force. Only a handful managed to escape back to safety to report the disastrous outcome. Spurred by this victory, the Gujarati commanders intensified their siege.

Observing events from Ujjain, Medini Rai learned through intelligence reports that the defenders inside Mandu were facing severe hardship and could not sustain the defense much longer. In response, he dispatched directive Rai Pithaura, instructing him to initiate treaty discussions. He urged the garrison to prolong negotiations for a month to gain reinforcements from Rana Sanga which would compel Muzaffar Shah to withdraw without fighting. After sending these orders to Rai Pithaura, Medini Rai departed for Chittor to gain the Rana's aid directly. Consequently, on January 8, 1518, Rai Pithaura sent trusted envoys to present surrender conditions to Kaiser Khan and Khudawand Khan. They set forth three conditions. First, the Gujarati forces must withdraw six miles which would prevent the Sultan from observing Rajput movements. Second, a month be granted for evacuation, which was deemed sufficient for reinforcements to arrive from the Rana of Mewar. Lastly, the fortress be surrendered thereafter. The assurances of evacuation and surrender were merely a stratagem to of Medini Rai. Kaisar Khan submitted the offered gifts to Sultan Muzaffar, who subsequently approved the proposed terms. According to Nizamuddin Ahmad, Muzaffar Shah doubted the proposals were delusive but agreed anyway. Additionally, Mahmud Khalji II sought to avoid an all-out assault on the citadel to protect his family residing inside, which likely prompted him to persuade Sultan Muzaffar to agree to the terms. In the meantime, Adil Khan Ill of Khandesh also joined Muzaffar Shah.

Gates of the fortress of Mandu

Delhi Gate

Bhangi Gate

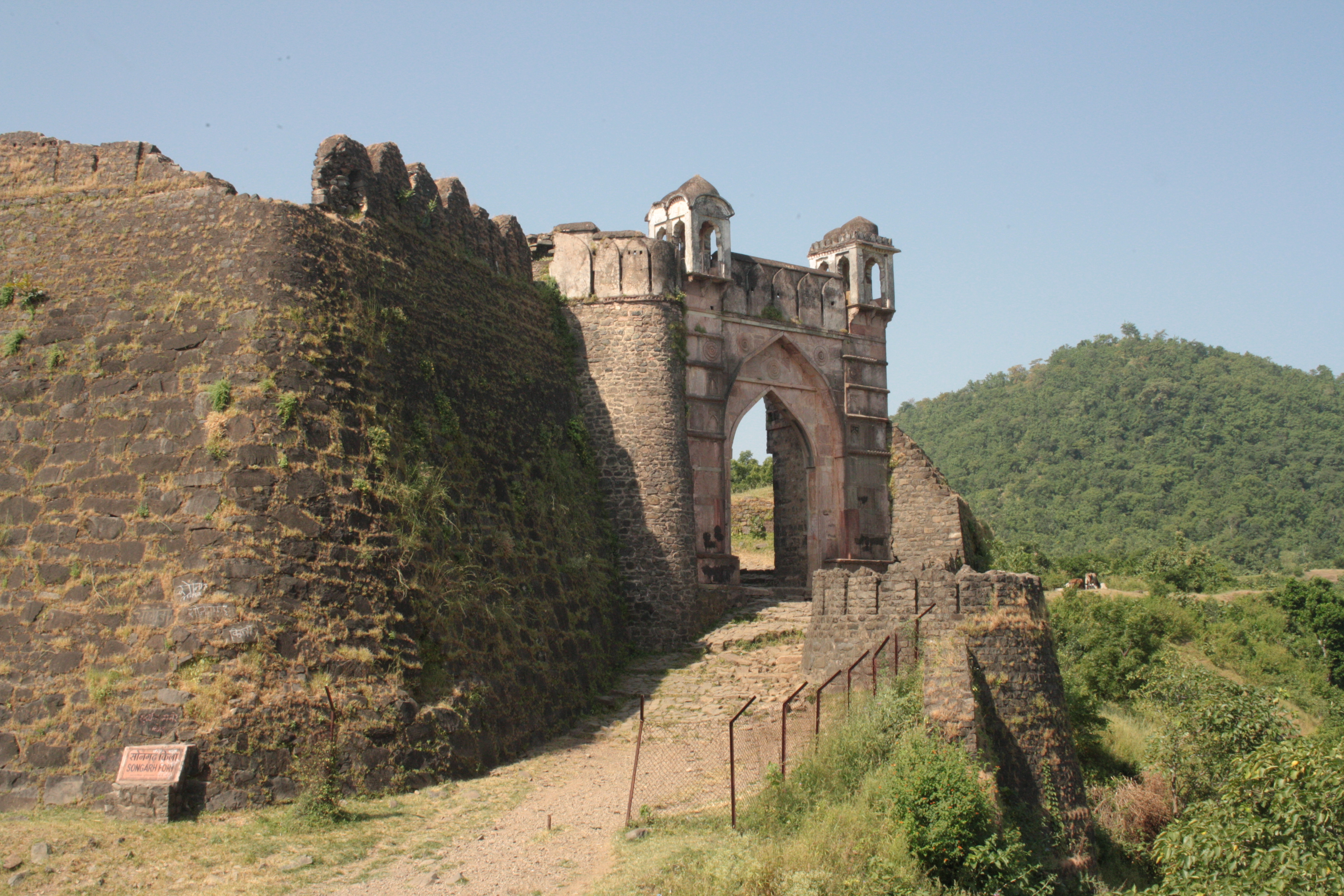
Songarh Gate

After the fixed time, Rai Pithaura made no signs to vacate Mandu. Muzaffar Shah realized the evacuation had not occurred and noticed continuous elephant movements around the citadel. Suspecting a trick, his doubts were confirmed when intelligence revealed that Medini Rai with Rana Sanga, had Ujjain. Rana Sanga's arrival at Sarangpur confirmed his assessment. To eliminate this threat, he dispatched Adil Khan III and Kiwam-ul-Mulk to check Rana Sanga's advance while personally directing an aggressive, renewed assault to capture the fortress before the Rana's arrival. Reorganizing his siege artillery, he stationed Kaisar Khan at the Delhi Gate, positioned Mahmud Khalji by the Shahpur Gate, and deployed Imad-ul-Mulk facing the Chanderi direction. The siege was renewed again on Sunday, 6 February 1518. Four days of intense fighting followed, resulting in severe casualties on both sides. Imad-ul-Mulk greatly inflicted damage on the enemies. One man came from the fort and revealed a secret way to the fort. He also informed that the Rajputs would be celebrating the Holi in the coming days, would leave key posts thinly defended. Imad-ul-Mulk kept this intelligence hidden from Muzaffar Shah. On the right day he led an assault with 100 men encountering no resistance. His men attacked toward the main gate and forced it open after killing the guards. As the attackers pushed deeper into the fortress, Muzaffar Shah received information of the event and arrived with strong reinforcements. Realizing defence was impossible, the Rajputs made a final attempt to halt the advance but were driven back. They set fire to their house, and the women committed jauhar. The Rajput soldiers fought a last stand and slain. On Saturday 2 Safar 924 A.H. corresponding to 23 February 1518, (Note: 13 February 1518 (Julian calendar)) Mandu was conquered by the Gujarati army.

According to Hajji-ud-Dabir and Sikandar, Rajputs casualties were nineteen thousand excluding the children and women. While Firishta and Muhammad 'Ali Khan Ansari author of Tarikh-i-Muzaffarshahi, including the women and children, gives the number of dead as forty thousand. Ansari adds that amongst the Rajputs fifty-seven sardars were killed. Amongst the slain were Rai Pithaura, Udai Karan, Sadi Khan, Bahadur Khan, Dungar Singh, Bikram Singh, Kahan Deo, Horal Deo, Jamar Deo, Sangam Deo, Ujanat Deo, Ghazi Khan, Ratan Chand, Manak Chand, Daulat Khan, Yak Lakhi, Akhi Chand, Kirat Chand, Kaku, Malkhan, Rai Jangju, Pathan Pila, Jit Singh, Fath Khan, Sons of Sher Khan, Sons of Jagar Sen, Kakah and Pahan.

== Aftermath ==
The captured were brought before the Sultan. Muzaffar Shah ordered executions for some while releasing others. He also ordered everyone to be identified. During this inspection, several immediate family members of Medini Rai specifically a son, two daughters, and a wife were recognized among the detainees. He then moved to Nalcha on 18 February. Before leaving he restored Mahmud Khalji to the throne. Rana Sanga hearing the fall of Mandu left Sarangpur near Ujjain with Medini Rai and Silhadi. Muzaffar Shah abandoned the idea to pursue the Rana. Badan son of Medini Rai and Hemkaran Purbiya were wounded and fled from the fort. The prince narrated the massacre of the Rajputs before dying of his wounds while the latter survived. Deeply saddened by these events, Medini Rai attempted to commit suicide. However, Rana Sanga intervened to stop him and subsequently granted him the fiefdoms of Chanderi and Gagron. Muzaffar Shah destroyed the Rajputs in Ujjain and captured Dhar. Here Adil Khan and Mahmud Khalji joined him. While staying at Dhar Muzaffar Shah received Mahmud Khalji's invitation to Mandu. He sent his son with valuable gifts, including Sultan Ahmad Shah II's belt and sword captured at the Battle of Kapadvanj. Muzaffar Shah accepted the invitation. He entered Mandu, accompanied by Prince Bahadur Khan and Prince Latif Khan on February 26, 1518. During his stay, some Gujarati nobles advised the Sultan to annex Malwa, since around 10,000 Gujarat troops were killed in the siege. However, driven by a sense of religious duty and moral obligation to assist a fellow Muslim in distress, he refused the advice. To resist personal temptation and guard his nobles against imperialistic ideas, he immediately departed from the fort. While departing, Muzaffar Shah departed loaded with precious stones, textiles, elephants, and Turkish horses. After Mahmud escorted him as far as Deola before taking leave. Adil Khan III returned to Khandesh. Muzaffar Shah left 10,000 Gujarati troops under Asaf Khan under the guise of protection, he effectively placed Mahmud under surveillance, reducing the Malwa ruler to a virtual dependent of Gujarat.

== See also ==
- Muzaffar Shah's invasion of Malwa
- Muzaffar Shah's invasion of Mewar

== Bibliography ==
- Day, Upendra Nath (1965). Medieval Malwa: A Political and Cultural History, 1401-1562. Munshi Ram Manohar Lal. ISBN 978-81-215-0401-0.
- Chaube, J. (1975). History of Gujarat Kingdom, 1458-1537. Munshiram Manoharlal Publishers. ISBN 978-0-88386-573-6.
- Commissariat, M. S. (1938). A History of Gujarat. Vol. I. Ahmadabad: Longmans Green & Co. Ltd.
