= Haridas Kesaria =

16th-century warrior and poet (died 1527)

- Died: Khanwa, Rajasthan (India)
- Cause of death: Killed in action
- Military career
- Allegiance: Kingdom of Mewar
- Branch: Army of Mewar
- Service years: 1508–1527
- Rank: Jagirdar of Genasara
- Known for: Battle of Gagron
- Conflicts: Mewar–Delhi war: Battle of Khatoli; Battle of Dholpur; Mewar–Malwa war: Battle of Gagron; Gujarat–Mewar war: Rana Sanga's invasion of Gujarat; First Mughal–Rajput war: Battle of Bayana; Battle of Khanwa †

Haridas Kesaria or Haridas Mahiyaria (died March 1527) was a 16th-century feudal chieftain, army commander and a poet from Rajasthan. In the Battle of Gagron, he captured the Sultan Mahmud Khalji II of Malwa Sultanate and presented him to the Rana. Haridas was a close ally of Rana Sanga, participating in many battles and campaigns of the Kingdom of Mewar.

== Clan and family ==
The Kesaria clan of the Charans originally belonged to Patan region of Gujarat, named after their ancestor Kesaria-ji. Kesaria lived in Patan under the rule of Siddharaj Jaisimha, who honoured him with a jagir of Genasara including 6 villages. In time, a descendent of Kesaria, Mandan Kesaria left Genasara and came to Mewar, where the Maharana being pleased with his talent and knowledge, awarded him the jagir of Mahiyari including 6 villages. It is from this jagir, the later Kesaria came to be known as Mahiyaria.

Haridas was born to Mandan Kesaria in Mewar. He, in turn, had four sons; three of who were named Udaibhan, Keshavdas and Haribhagat.

Keshavdas and Haribhagat died without issue. Haridas's grandson through Udaibhan, Devidas Mahiyaria, was an accomplished warrior. He was the military general of Gopaldas Shaktawat and after their victory in the Battle of Benaras, he was granted a jagir including 24 villages.

Haridas built a temple of kuldevi of Mahiyaria clan, Shri Sunderbai, in the village of Madri (Rajsamand). Another shrine of this goddess was also built in village of Bhildi (Jahazpur), which is still present.

=== Anecdotes ===
Several anecdotes are popular about Haridas. One legend is that once when Rana Sanga was out hunting with his companions, one of his elephants tied nearby became enraged after being teased. The animal broke its chain and ran after them Sanga's hunting party. Others ran away but Haridas did not leave Sanga's side. When there was no way to escape, Sanga spoke to Haridas that you keep singing the praises of your kuldevis, why don't you call them today for protection? On this, Haridas said a couplet to his Aradhyashakti Shri Sunderbai-

आण दबाया गज अठे, और न हेक उपाय। ‘सुन्दर’ मां सज आवजे, सांगा तणी सहाय।।

And immediately they saw that the defiant elephant was being stopped by a force and it calmed down, thus preventing any harm to Sanga and Haridas.

== Role in the Battle of Gagron (1519) ==
The battle was fought between the Mewar kingdom on one side and the Malwa Sultanate assisted by Gujarat Sultanate on the other. The Mewar army was reinforced by Rathores of Merta. Sultan Mahmud Khalji II headed the Sultanate army and marched through Gagron where he was faced by a large army of Rana Sanga. In the ensuing battle, Mewar army fought bravely and Haridas captured the Sultan and presented him to Sanga.

In the celebration of this victory, Rana Sanga, pleased with the bravery and courage of Haridas, granted him the fort of Chittor. However, Haridas humbly returned the fortress back to Maharana and accepted a small jagir of twelve villages. The jagir included villages of Madri, Beri, Panchali etc. Panchali remained with Haridas's descendents until modern times.

At the Rana Sanga panorama built in Khanwa (Bharatpur), Sanga's victory in the Battle of Gagron and his benevolent behavior towards the defeated Sultan is displayed in the inscribed historical Dingal verses, authored by Haridas himself:

Dingal

मांडव गढ़ गर्जर ग्रह मुके, रैणवां दीघ चत्रगढ़ राण।

IAST Romanization

māṃḍava gaढ़ garjara graha muke, raiṇavāṃ dīgha catragaढ़ rāṇa।

English translation

Thou, O! Rana, didst allow the kings of Mandu and Gujarat to return home, and gavest away the fortress of Chitor to Renwa Charan.

== Last battle and death ==
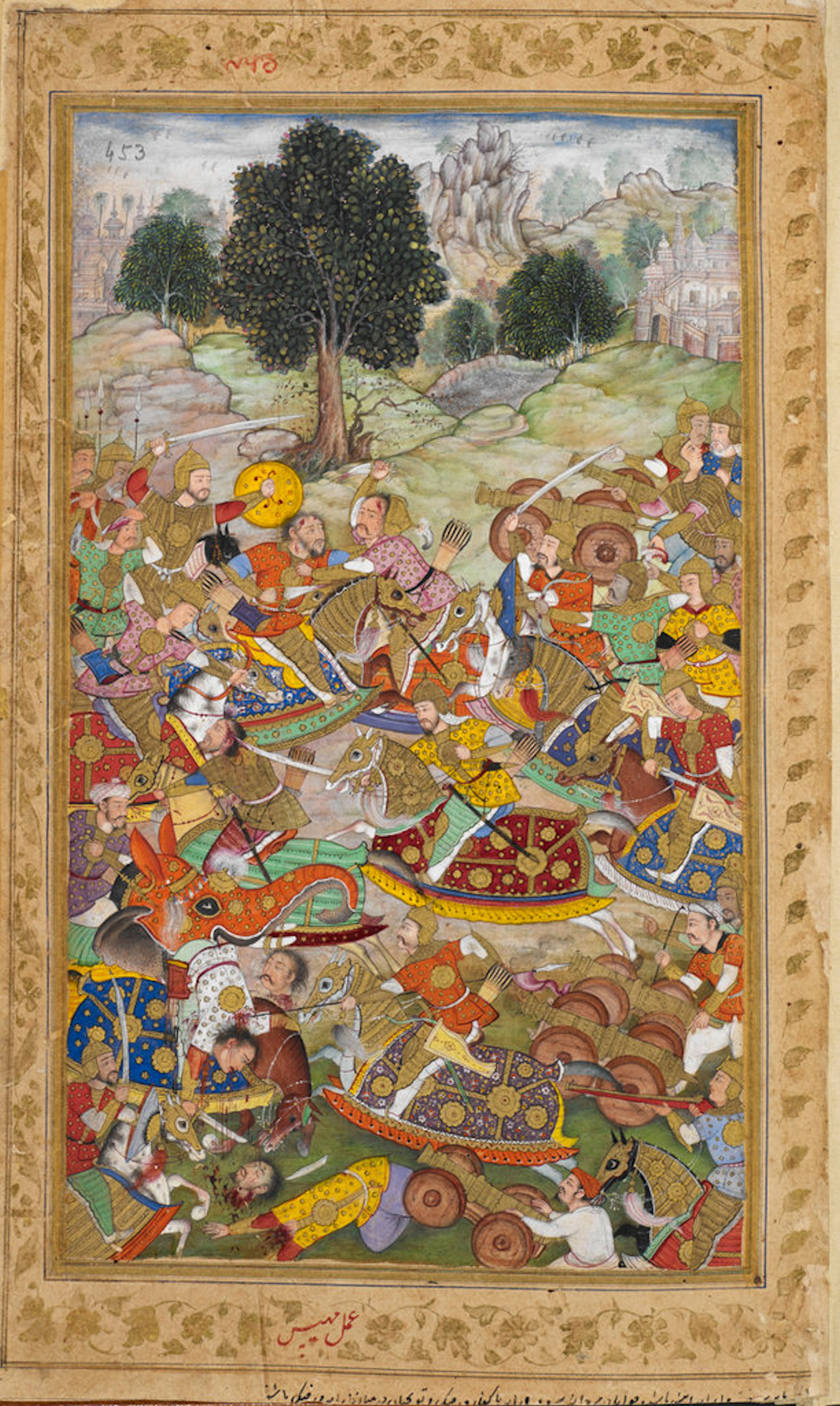
Mughal painting depicting the Rajput Army (Left) battling the Mughal Army (Right)

Throughout his life, Haridas was a valued member of Mewar court and fought many battles as commander including Battle of Bayana. In March 1527, Haridas died fighting valiantly alongside Sanga in the Battle of Khanwa against the Mughal ruler, Babur.

== Works ==
Haridas was a good poet and some of his miscellaneous works including Dingal Gits on Rana Sanga are found.

- Moja Samaṃda Mālavata Mahābalū (मोज समंद मालवत महाबलू)
- Dhana Sāṃgā Hāta Hamīra Kalodhara (धन सांगा हात हमीर कलोधर)
