= Muzaffar Shah's invasion of Mewar =

1520–1521 conflicts part of Gujarat–Mewar Wars

- Part of Gujarat–Mewar Wars
Date	December 1520 – 1521
Location	Mewar and Mandsaur (in present day Madhya Pradesh and Rajasthan)
Result	Inconclusive § Peace treaty
Territorial changes	Status quo ante bellum

Belligerents
Kingdom of Mewar; Rajput principalities	Gujarat Sultanate; Malwa Sultanate

Commanders and leaders
Rana Sanga; Rawal Udai Singh (WIA); Ugrasen Purbiya (WIA); Medini Rai; Silhadi; Ashok Mal Parmar	Muzaffar Shah II; Malik Ayyaz; Kiwam-ul-Mulk; Nizam-ul-Mulk; Taj Khan; Shuja-ul-Mulk; Safdar Khan; Tughluq Shah Mahmud Khalji II

Strength
Large Rajput army Vagad: 100 cavalry Mandsaur: Medini Rai: 1,000 cavalry; 100 elephants Silhadi: 10,000 cavalry; 100 elephants	Gujarat: 100,000 cavalry 100 elephants Malwa: Unknown; Vagad: 200 cavalry

Casualties and losses
Vagad: 80 killed Mandsaur: Heavy	Vagad: Unknown; Mandsaur: Unknown

Muzaffar Shah's invasion of Mewar was a military campaign launched by the Gujarat Sultanate under Sultan Muzaffar Shah II against the Kingdom of Mewar under Rana Sanga in late 1520–1521. Undertaken to avenge Rana Sanga's invasion of Gujarat which resulted attacks on Idar, Ahmadnagar, Vadnagar and Visnagar. The expedition was placed under the command of Malik Ayaz, governor of Sorath.

After assembling a large army of 100,000 cavalry and 100 elephants, Malik Ayaz first ravaged the Vagad region, sacking Dungarpur and Banswara. He then advanced to besiege the fort of Mandsaur. Rana Sanga reinforced the garrison and gathered a strong coalition nearby. The Gujarati forces were joined by Sultan Mahmud Khalji II of Malwa. Internal rivalries and poor coordination among the Gujarati commanders repeatedly undermined the siege. The campaign ended inconclusively. A vague peace arrangement was concluded, but no decisive military success was achieved. Malik Ayaz withdrew without any territorial or monetary gain. Contemporary and later assessments generally regard the expedition as a failure for Gujarat. The only tangible results were the earlier plundering of Dungarpur and Banswara. Rana Sanga later made peace with Muzaffar Shah avoiding further conflicts

== Background ==
Muzaffar Shah decided to avenge Rana Sanga's unprovoked attack on Idar and Ahmadnagar, along with the sacking of the towns of Vadnagar and Visnagar. To encourage the soldiers the allowance was raised from 10-20% and one year's pay in advance. He ordered his generals to assemble for the campaign. Malik Ayaz, governor of Sorath, arrived with 20,000 cavalry, artillery and gunners. He asked to command the Mewar expedition and vowed to capture or kill Rana Sanga.

== Conflicts at Vagad ==
In December 1520 Muzaffar Shah led the main army and encamped at Harsol. There a contingent from Ahmadnagar arrived. He appointed Malik Ayaz as the commander of this expedition. He accompanied Malik Ayaz as far as Ahmadnagar and then returned to Ahmadabad. Malik Ayaz had a strong force of 100,000 cavalry and 1000 elephants. Sultan Muzaffar also sent Malik Sarang Kiwam-uI-MuIk with a force of 20,000 cavalry and 20 elephants. At Modasa, Taj Khan and Nizam-ul-Mulk joined Malik Ayaz. However, Malik Ayaz underestimating that such a large force was unnecessary and sent back all the newly arrived elephants and cavalry. The Gujarati army plundered Bakor and Galiakot too. From Modasa they encamped at Dhamola. Malik Ayaz sent detachments under Safdar Khan to ravage Vagad as Rawal Udai Singh had earlier aided Rana Sanga against Gujarat. They burnt and plundered the capital Dungarpur. Rawat Gajja was slain in battle. Udai Singh abandoned it and fled to Banswara with Ugrasen Purbiya to resist the invaders. After plundering Dungarpur, Malik Ayaz advanced through Sagwara. Malik Shuja-ul-Mulk and Safdar Khan, learnt that Rawal Udai Singh and Ugrasen Purbiya planned a night ambush. They attacked with only 200 light cavalry. The Rajputs were 100 in strength. A fierce fight followed in the defiles. The terrain favoured the Rajputs. The Gujaratis had suffered a reverse. The next morning's punitive march by Kiwam-ul-Mulk. 80 Rajputs were killed. Both Udai Singh and Ugrasen were wounded and retreat into the defile. Next day, Kiwam-ul-Mulk attacked the local chiefs but found none. He plundered Banswara and returned to camp. Rawal Udai Singh and Ugrasen did not offer any fight. The Rawal stayed hidden while Ugrasen hurried to warn Rana Sanga of the coming invasion. The Gujarati army lacked discipline and unity. Malik Ayaz, the supreme commander, was never consulted with anyone. The skirmishes occurred without his knowledge. He never kept contact with Sultan Muzaffar.

== Siege of Mandsaur ==
Ugrasen Purbiya informed Rana Sanga about the invasion. Rana appointed Ashok Mal Parmar replacing Medini Rai as the governor of Mandsur and reinforced its garrison. After ravaging the Rajput principalities, Malik Ayaz reached the vicinity of Mandsur. Rana Sanga gathered his forces and camped at Modasa, 24 miles from Mandsur. Medini Rai joined him with 1,000 cavalry and 100 elephants. Silhadi who had been heading to join Malik Ayaz with 10,000 cavalry and 100 elephants, was persuaded by Medini Rai to switch sides. Neighbouring chiefs and rajas also rallied to the Rana's banner. The Gujarati amry laid siege on Mandsur. They pressed the attack by digging mines and building sabats (covered approaches) to the fort walls. In the meantime, Mahmud Khalji II of the Malwa Sultanate arrived with reinforcements. Kiwam-ul-Mulk, Mubariz-ul-Mulk and others were on bad terms with Malik Ayaz. He was jealous of Malik Ayaz's appointment as the supreme commander. Kiwam-ul-Mulk acting on his own attacked to breach the wall. Success was near, but Malik Ayaz, jealous of sharing the credit, ordered him to withdraw. This grew in the army. Ayaz wanted sole credit for victory. Then, Mubariz-ul-Mulk attacked the Rajput camp without orders. This time Malik Ayaz sent Tughluq Shah to recall him. Mubariz obeyed the orders to avoid the Sultan's anger. He waited for his own mine to explode; the bastion collapsed, but the breach proved impracticable. The besieging army lost the chances of success.

== Peace treaty ==
Rana Sanga sent envoys to make peace with Malik Ayaz. It was difficult to supply and reinforce the garrison. Additionally, there were no artillery to counter the enemy's fire and no sign of fighting on open ground. Further conflict could have brought combined attack by Gujarat, Malwa, and Khandesh. According to Hajji-ud-Dabir, the Rana promised to return all the captives and elephants captured in Ahmadnagar. Malik Ayaz paid no attention to the peace proposals and pressed the siege harder. The presence of Mahmud Khalji II with strong reinforcements had already caused panic in the Rajput camp. Thus, Rana Sanga sent a second proposal. According to Firishta, this time he promised to acknowledge Muzaffar Shah's suzerainty. Nizamuddin Ahmad states that Sanga informed Malik Ayaz he had already despatched an envoy to the Sultan. Malik Ayaz accepted the peace proposal on the condition that it received Muzaffar Shah's approval, and he ordered an immediate suspension of hostilities. Kiwam-ul-Mulk and other opposed the cease-fire and consulted with Mahmud Khalji II to make final attack. The Gujarati generals were about to lead the final assault; Malik Ayaz withdrew back with the main army twenty miles to Khaljipur. Mahmud Khalji abandoned the planned assault on the fort, since Rana Sanga treated him well after his capture following the Battle of Gagron. Besides his son remained a hostage. Mahmud Khalji's decision forced Kiwam-ul-Mulk to drop the idea of an assault as well. He too withdrew to Khaljipur to avoid displeasing Muzaffar Shah. According to Mirat-i-Sikandari, Malik Ayaz made peace with Rana Sanga without informing the Sultan.

== Aftermath ==
Sultan Muzaffar was furious with Malik Ayaz. According to Sikandar, he withheld the customary robe of honour when Ayaz departed for Sorath, and the public branded him a coward. Denison Ross states that Rana Sanga agreed to pay tribute and send a son as hostage. Yet Ayaz returned with neither, showing that no real peace treaty occurred. The expedition achieved nothing beyond the sacking of Dungarpur and Banswara. The supposed peace treaty was vague. The Mewar campaign was a total failure, and Malik Ayaz returned without any effective settlement. The campaign failed to achieve its objective. On his part, Sanga could not post a decisive victory over his opponents either.

The outcome of the Mewar campaign deeply distressed Muzaffar Shah, who resolved to lead a new expedition in 1522 by himself. Malik Ayaz secretly contacted Rana Sanga to send his eldest son to Ahmadabad with presents. Moreover, in 1521, Ibrahim Lodi of the Delhi Sultanate invaded Ranthambore and Ajmer leading Rana Sanga to make peace with Muzaffar Shah. According to medieval accounts, the Rana dispatched his son with elephants and other gifts. Hajji-ud-Dabir and Mirat-i-Sikandari state that Muzaffar abandoned the planned campaign upon the prince's arrival. Gifts were offered as tribute under earlier terms; other chronicles are silent on the matter. Modern assessment regards the visit as a goodwill mission, with the offerings amounting to little more than presents but no tribute.

== Bibliography ==
- Chaube, J. (1975). History of Gujarat Kingdom, 1458-1537. Munshiram Manoharlal Publishers. ISBN 978-0-88386-573-6.
- Somani, Ramavallabha (1976). History of Mewar, from Earliest Times to 1751 A.D. Mateshwari Publications.
- Commissariat, M. S. (1938). A History of Gujarat. Vol. I. Ahmadabad: Longmans Green & Co. Ltd.
- Hooja, Rima (2006). A History of Rajasthan. Rupa & Company. ISBN 978-81-291-0890-6.
- Haig, W. (1928). The Cambridge History of India: Turks and Afghans, edited by W. Haig. Vol. III. Cambridge University Press.
