= Battle of Ahmednagar =

1520 battle in Gujarat

- Part of Rana Sanga's invasion of Gujarat
Date	1520
Location	Hathmati river near Himatnagar, Gujarat
Result	Rajput victory
Territorial changes	Ahmadnagar captured and sacked by the Rajputs

Belligerents
Kingdom of Mewar; Kingdom of Marwar; Kingdom of Merta; Dungarpur State; Banswara state; Idar State	Gujarat Sultanate

Commanders and leaders
Rana Sanga; Rao Ganga; Rawal Udai Singh; Rao Biramadeo; Raimal Rathore	Nizam-ul-Mulk (WIA); Hamid-ul-Mulk †; Ghazi Khan †; Sultan Shah †; Asad-ul-Mulk †; Ibrahim Khan; Safdar Khan

Strength
Total: 52,000; Mewar: 40,000 cavalry and infantry; Marwar: 7,000 cavalry; Merta: 5,000 cavalry	1,200 cavalry 1,000 infantry Unknown musketeers

The Battle of Ahmadnagar was fought in 1520 on the banks of Hathmati river near Ahmadnagar (present-day Himatnagar in Gujarat) between the combined Rajput forces under Rana Sanga of Mewar and the army of the Gujarat Sultanate led by Mubariz-ul-Mulk. The conflicts began when Mubariz-ul-Mulk, the governor of Idar, publicly insulted Rana Sanga by labelling him a dog. Taking this insult as a pretext, Sanga assembled a large army of 52,000 troops, including contingents from Marwar, Merta, Dungarpur, and Banswara, and invaded Gujarat. He first captured Idar, reinstated his son-in-law Raimal Rathore on the throne, and then advanced towards Ahmadnagar. In the following battle on the banks of the Hathmati river, the Gujarati forces initially routed the unprepared Rajput vanguard and centre. However, the pursuit broke the communication among the army. This led to confusion and many Gujarati soldiers retreated. Key Gujarati commanders, including Hamid-ul-Mulk, Ghazi Khan, and Sultan Shah, were encircled by the Rajputs and subsequently slain in the battle. The governor Mubariz-ul-Mulk was seriously wounded and fled to Ahmedabad. Rana Sanga gaining victory, besieged the fort of Ahmadnagar. It fell without much resistance. The Rajputs sacked the town. The combined army later penetrated deep into Gujarat and plundered here and there.

== Background ==
After restoring authority over Idar, Muzaffar Shah II appointed officers to check activities of Raimal. Nizam-ul-Mulk titled Mubariz-ul-Mulk, the governor of Idar was a man of rash temperament. He contemptuously named Rana Sanga as a dog and chained it at the gate of the fort. It was reported to the Rana. Rana Sanga being enraged decided to punish the governor of Idar. According to Nizamuddin Ahmad and Firishta, this was the main reason for Rana Sanga's invasion on Idar. He was looking for an opportunity to invade Idar to restore Raimal to the throne. The contemptuous remark of Nizam-ul-Mulk served as a pretext for Rana's attack on Idar.

== Prelude ==
In 1520, Rana Sanga advanced with 40,000 troops, joined by Rao Ganga of Marwar and Rao Biramadeo of Merta with 7,000 and 5,000 cavalries respectively. At Vagad, Rawal Udai Singh of the Dungarpur State and the chief of Banswara also joined, bringing the total to about 52,000. The Gujarati garrison at Idar numbered only around 5,000. Many of whom were away in Ahmedabad. Governor Mubariz-ul-Mulk sought reinforcements, but messages were blocked by rival officers. He resolved to fight but forced to retreat to Ahmadnagar. 100 Silahdars under Malik Bakhan disobeyed orders. All of them were killed in the battle. Sanga captured Idar, reinstated his son-in-law Raimal. He demolished a mosque and built a Hindu temple at that place. Various local chiefs and zamindars submitted to him and then advanced on Ahmadnagar. He now proceeded to Ahmadnagar, where Mubariz-ul-Mulk had taken position.

== Battle ==
Mubariz-ul-Mulk was alarmed by the Rajput arrival at Vagad. He did not want to fight the Rajputs on the plains. Nevertheless, Mubariz-ul-Mulk resolved to make a desperate stand against the enemy. He left a garrison of 500 men in the fort and himself came out early the next morning with a small force of 1,200 cavalry, 1,000 infantry and musketeers. Mubariz-ul-Mulk took positions on the opposite bank of the Hathmati river as the battlefield. He crossed the river and arranged his battle formations. In the evening the Rajput army arrived at Ahmadnagar. Rana Sanga had neither pitched his camp nor properly arranged his army when four hundred Gujarati soldiers attacked and completely routed the vanguard and centre of the Rajput army. They drove the 20,000 cavalry in centre as far as two miles. They suffered an initial setback. In pursuit of the enemy the Gujaratis had gone far away and disappeared from sight. The remaining soldiers, believing their comrades to have been slain, fled towards the fort of Ahmadnagar. When Ghazi Khan, Ibrahim Khan and Sultan Shah returned to the battlefield, they found that their men had already left the field. Encircled on all sides by the Rajputs, they were forced to fight. Hamid-ul-Mulk, Ghazi Khan and Sultan Shah were slain fighting with their followers. Mubariz-ul-Mulk, himself seriously wounded. He retreated with 40 troops to reinforce the garrison. Before his arrival, his men had already evacuated the fort. In great confusion Mubariz-ul-Mulk, Safdar Khan and others fled to Ahmadabad via Vadnagar. Asad-ul-Mulk, who was also retreating by the direct road was killed. His entire baggage fell into the hands of the Rajput soldiers. Thus, Rana Sanga came out victorious in the battle.

== Aftermath ==
The Rajputs besieged the fort of Ahmadnagar. It was captured without any resistance. During the siege Dungar Singh was seriously wounded. The Rajputs sacked Ahmadnagar and enslaved the inhabitants. On the next day, Rana Sanga reached Vadnagar but spared it since most of its inhabitants were Brahmins. He next invaded Visnagar. Hatim Khan, the governor opposed him but was killed in action. The town was then sacked. Ain-ul-Mulk and Fateh Khan were dispatched with reinforcements. After which Rana Sanga decided to end his campaign. He had achieved his main objectives of restoring Raimal to the throne of Idar and punishing Mubariz-ul-Mulk. Rana Sanga returned to Chittor via Idar. In 1521, Muzaffar Shah invaded Mewar in response of the unprovoked aggression by the Rana.

== See also ==
- Siege of Ahmednagar (1803)
- Siege of Ahmednagar (1543)
- Siege of Ahmednagar (1558–1559)
- Siege of Ahmednagar (1561–1562)

== Bibliography ==
- Chaube, J. (1975). History of Gujarat Kingdom, 1458-1537. Munshiram Manoharlal Publishers. ISBN 978-0-88386-573-6.
- Somani, Ramavallabha (1976). History of Mewar, from Earliest Times to 1751 A.D. Mateshwari Publications.
- Commissariat, M. S. (1938). A History of Gujarat. Vol. I. Ahmadabad: Longmans Green & Co. Ltd.
