= Siege of Mandsaur =

1521 siege in Madhya Pradesh

- Part of Muzaffar Shah's invasion of Mewar
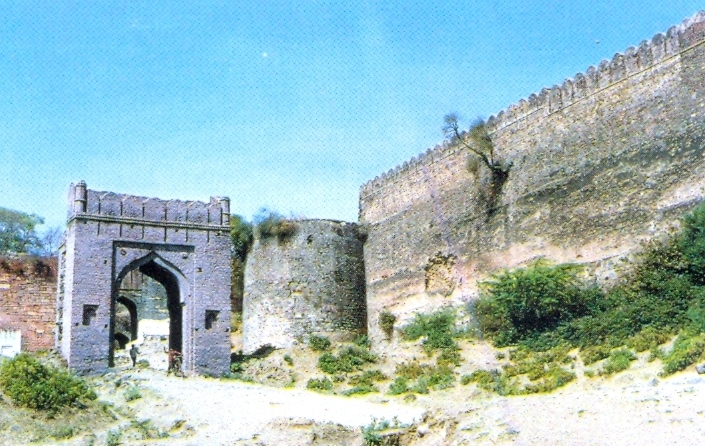
- Mandsaur Fort
| Date | January 1521 A.D. |
| Location | Mandsaur, Madhya Pradesh |
| Result | Peace treaty |
| Territorial changes | Status quo ante bellum |

Belligerents
| Kingdom of Mewar; Vassal states | Gujarat Sultanate; Malwa Sultanate |

Commanders and leaders
| Rana Sanga; Silhadi; Medini Rai; Ashok Mal | Malik Ayaz; Kiwam-ul-Mulk; Mubariz-ul-Mulk; Tughluq Shah; Mahmud Khalji II |

Strength
| Medini Rai: 1,000 cavalry 100 elephants Silhadi: 10,000 cavalry 100 elephants | Unknown |

The Siege of Mandsaur was a military conflict in 1521 at Mandsaur (present-day Madhya Pradesh) between the Kingdom of Mewar under Rana Sanga and the Gujarat Sultanate, commanded by Malik Ayaz with support from Mahmud Khalji II of the Malwa Sultanate.

Rana Sanga reinforced Mandsaur and assembled a large coalition joined by Medini Rai, Silhadi, and other Rajput chiefs. Malik Ayaz besieged the fort, using mines and covered approaches, and received reinforcements from Sultan Mahmud Khalji II of Malwa. Internal rivalries and jealousy among the Gujarati commanders hindered progress. Facing supply difficulties and the threat of a wider coalition against him, Rana Sanga proposed peace. After initial rejection, Malik Ayaz suspended hostilities and withdrew the main army. The fort was not captured. The campaign is generally regarded as a failure, yielding no lasting gains beyond the earlier plundering of neighbouring territories, and Malik Ayaz returned to face the displeasure of his sultan.

== Background ==
Rana Sanga hearing the news of invasion appointed Ashok Mal governor of Mandsur and reinforced its garrison. After ravaging the Rajput principalities, Malik Ayaz advanced through Karji-Ghat and reached the vicinity of Mandsur. Rana Sanga gathered his forces and camped at Modasa, 24 miles from Mandsur. Medini Rai joined him with 1,000 cavalry and 100 elephants. Neighbouring chiefs and rajas also rallied to the Rana's banner. Silhadi who had been heading to join Malik Ayaz with 10,000 cavalry and 100 elephants, was persuaded by Medini Rai to switch sides.

== Siege ==
Gujarati army besieged Mandsur by digging mines and building sabats (covered approaches) to the fort walls. Sultan Mahmud Khalji II of Malwa Sultanate arrived with reinforcements. Progress, however, was slowed by internal jealousy amongst the Gujarati commanders. Kiwam-ul-Mulk and other amirs were on bad terms with Malik Ayaz. Few days later Kiwam-ul-Mulk advanced close enough to breach the wall. Success was near, but Malik Ayaz, jealous of sharing the credit, ordered him to withdraw. Kiwam-ul-Mulk obeyed the order. Dissatisfaction grew in the army against Malik Ayaz. Then Mubariz-ul-Mulk attacked the Rajput camp by himself. Malik Ayaz sent Tughluq Shah to recall him, and he obeyed to avoid the Sultan's anger. Malik Ayaz wanted sole credit for victory. He waited for his own mine to explode. When the bastion collapsed, but the breach proved impracticable. The Gujarati army lost the chances of victory.

Although supported by neighbouring chiefs, Rana Sanga feared a combined offensive by the forces of Gujarat, Malwa, and Khandesh. According to Haji-ud-Dabir, the Rana offered to restore prisoners and elephants captured at Ahmadnagar and pledged not to violate any agreement. Confident of success, Malik Ayaz initially rejected the proposal and intensified the siege. Growing dissatisfaction among the Gujarati nobles and troops, however, compelled Ayaz to reconsider. The arrival of Sultan Mahmud Khalji II with reinforcements further influenced developments on both sides. Rana Sanga submitted a second set of proposals, which, according to Firishta, largely repeated the earlier terms but added recognition of Muzaffar Shah's suzerainty. Nizamuddin Ahmad records that the Rana informed Ayaz of an envoy already despatched to the Sultan. Ayaz accepted the overture subject to the Sultan's approval and ordered an immediate suspension of hostilities. Kiwam-ul-Mulk and other officers opposed the cease-fire. After consulting Mahmud Khalji II, they resolved to launch a final assault. When informed of their intention, Ayaz reminded Mahmud Khalji that he possessed discretionary authority over war and peace and forbade any action contrary to his wishes. Receiving no reply, Ayaz withdrew the main army to Khaljipur, approximately twenty miles from Mandsur, on the day fixed for the attack. Mahmud Khalji, mindful of the courteous treatment he had earlier received from Rana Sanga and of his son's presence as a hostage, abandoned the planned assault. Kiwam-ul-Mulk likewise withdrew to Khaljipur to avoid the displeasure of Muzaffar Shah. Sikandar states that Malik Ayaz concluded peace without informing the Sultan.

== Aftermath ==
Rana Sanga failed to deliver a decisive victory and thus both sides sued for peace. A critical examination of the sources supports the conclusion that the Mewar campaign ended in failure for Gujarat and that Malik Ayaz returned with a peace treaty that brought no good result. Rana Sanga also agreed to sue for peace because the Afghans under Ibrahim Lodi invaded and attacked Ranthambore. The 16th-century text "Parshvanath-Shravan-Sattavisi", says that Rana Sanga further defeated Ibrahim Lodi at Ranthambore after the Siege of Mandsaur.

== Bibliography ==
- Chaube, J. (1975). History of Gujarat Kingdom, 1458-1537. Munshiram Manoharlal Publishers. ISBN 978-0-88386-573-6.
