= Mir Abdul Aziz =

16th-century Mughal commander

- Military career
- Allegiance: Mughal Empire
- Rank: Commander
- Conflicts: Battle of Bayana; Battle of Khanwa

Mir Abdul Aziz was a commander in the Mughal Empire.

== Battle of Bayana ==
Abdul Aziz was appointed by Babur to lead an advance guard to check Rana Sanga's advance. However he was defeated at the Battle of Bayana in February 1527.

== Battle of Khanwa ==
In 1527 Abdul Aziz participated in the Battle of Khanwa where he led a contingent of the Mughal Army and the Mughals inflicted a defeat on the Rajputs led by Rana Sanga. Rana Sanga was badly wounded by an arrow during the battle and was subsequently removed from the battlefield in unconscious state by Prithviraj Kachwaha of Amber.
