= Battle of Gagron =

1519 battle between Malwa Sultanate and Rajput confederacy

- Part of Mewar-Malwa Conflict
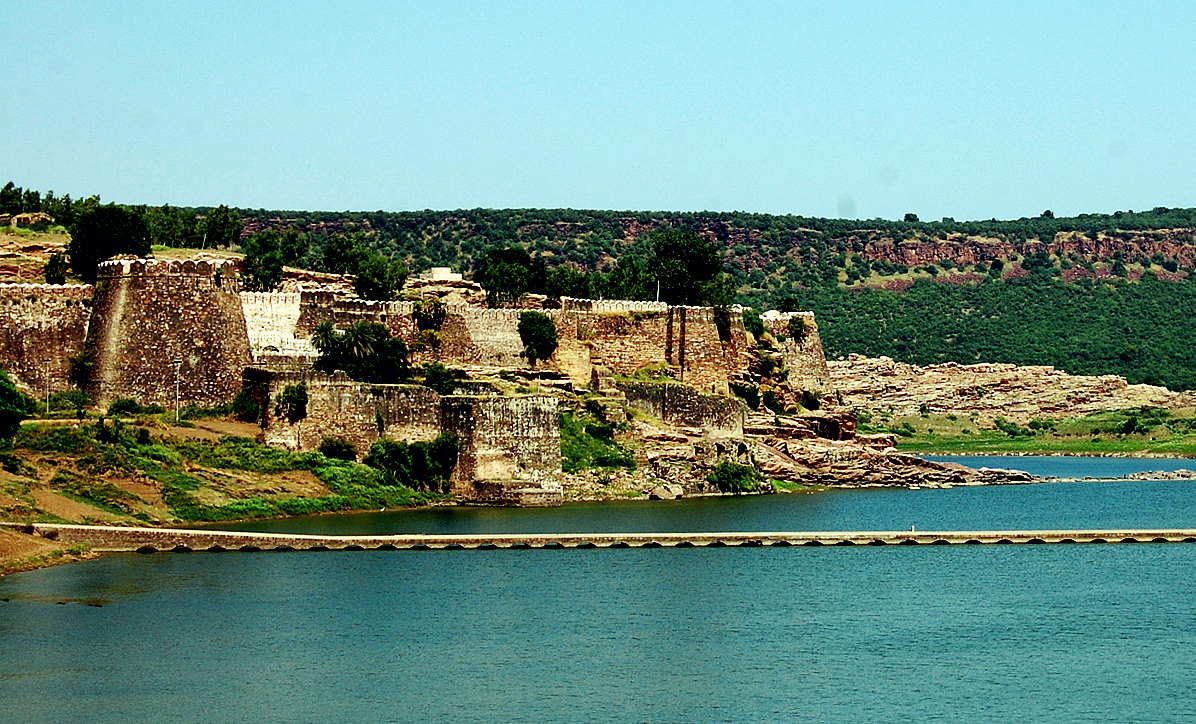
- Fort of Gagron in Rajasthan
Date	1519
Location	Gagron
Result	Mewar victory; Mahmud Khalji II taken as prisoner for six months.
Territorial changes	Raisen, Chanderi, Bhilsa, Kalpi, Sarangpur and Ranthambore captured by Mewar.

Belligerents
Kingdom of Mewar: Kingdom of Amber; Tomaras of Gwalior; Rathores of Merta	Malwa Sultanate; Gujarat Sultanate

Commanders and leaders
Rana Sanga; Haridas Kesaria; Ajja Jhala; Rao Viramdeva; Prithviraj Singh I Medini Rai	Mahmud Khilji II (POW); Asaf Khan

The Battle of Gagron was fought in 1519 between Mahmud Khalji II of Malwa and the Kingdom of Mewar's Rana Sanga. The conflict took place in Gagron (in the present-day Indian state of Rajasthan) and resulted in Sanga's victory, with him taking Mahmud captive and annexing significant territory.

== Background ==
Following the death of the Sultan of Malwa, Nasir-ud-Din Khalji, a succession struggle erupted amongst his sons. Mahmud Khalji II emerged victorious, primarily with the aid of the Rajput chief Medini Rai. The latter amassed considerable influence, resulting in the enmity of the Muslim nobles, with even the new sultan finding it necessary to appeal to Muzaffar Shah II of Gujarat. A Gujarati army was dispatched to Mandu, held by Medini Rai's son, and besieged it. The Rajput chief in turn appealed to Rana Sanga of Mewar for aid, who then marched his army into Malwa, reaching Sarangpur. However, Mandu was captured by the Gujaratis, prompting Sanga to return to Mewar alongside Medini Rai, who was then employed in his service.

== Battle ==
In retribution for them entering his territory, Mahmud marshalled an army against the Mewaris and marched it through Gagron. Sanga advanced with a large army from Chittor reinforced by the Rathors of Merta under Rao Viramdeva, and met Mahmud, accompanied by the Gujarat auxiliaries under Asaf Khan. The Mewari cavalry made a charge through that of the Gujarati, with the surviving men scattering. They subsequently did the same to the Malwa army, resulting in a decisive victory. Mahmud was wounded and taken prisoner by Rana Sanga, with most of his officers having died and his army decimated. Asaf Khan's son was killed, though he himself managed to escape.

== Aftermath ==
Sanga subsequently took control of Bhilsa, Raisen, Sarangpur, Chanderi and Ranthambore. Mahmud was kept captive at Chittor for 6 months, though the Rana himself is said to have personally tended to his wounds. He was subsequently allowed an "honourable" return to his own lands, though one of his sons remained at Mewar as a hostage. Mahmud later sent Sanga a jewelled belt and crown as gifts. Sanga presented the Chittor fortress to Haridas Kesaria after their victory, who humbly declined and accepted a jagir of 12 villages in return.
