= Khusrau Shah Kokultash =

16th-century general of the Mughal Empire

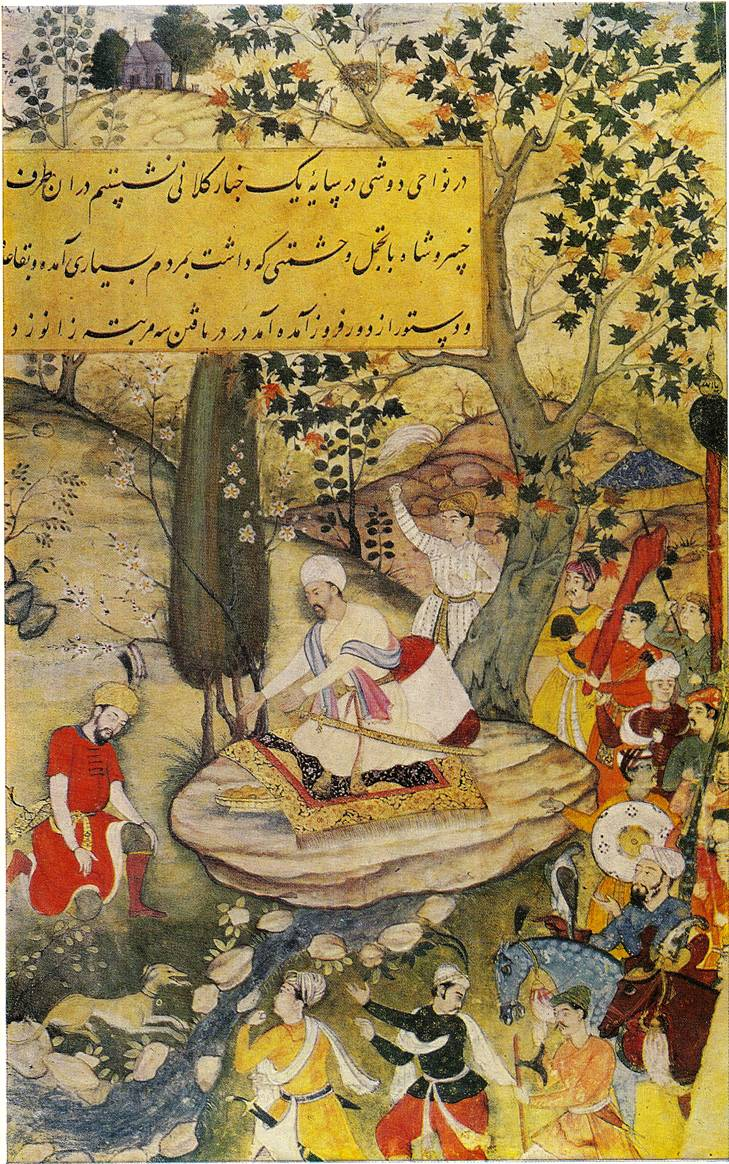
- Kusrau Shah Kokultash pays homage to Babur
- Military career
- Allegiance: Mughal Empire
- Rank: General
- Conflicts: Battle of Khanwa

Khusrau Shah Kokultash was a general of the Mughal Empire. Before Babur, the Mughal emperor, rose to power, he was an Indian Emir. Khusrau Shah paid homage and fealty to Babur on his arrival to northern India. He commanded the left wing of Babur's army at the Battle of Khanwa, where the Mughals defeated the Kingdom of Mewar in northern India.
