= Battle of Khanwa =

1527 battle between the Mughal Empire and the Kingdom of Mewar

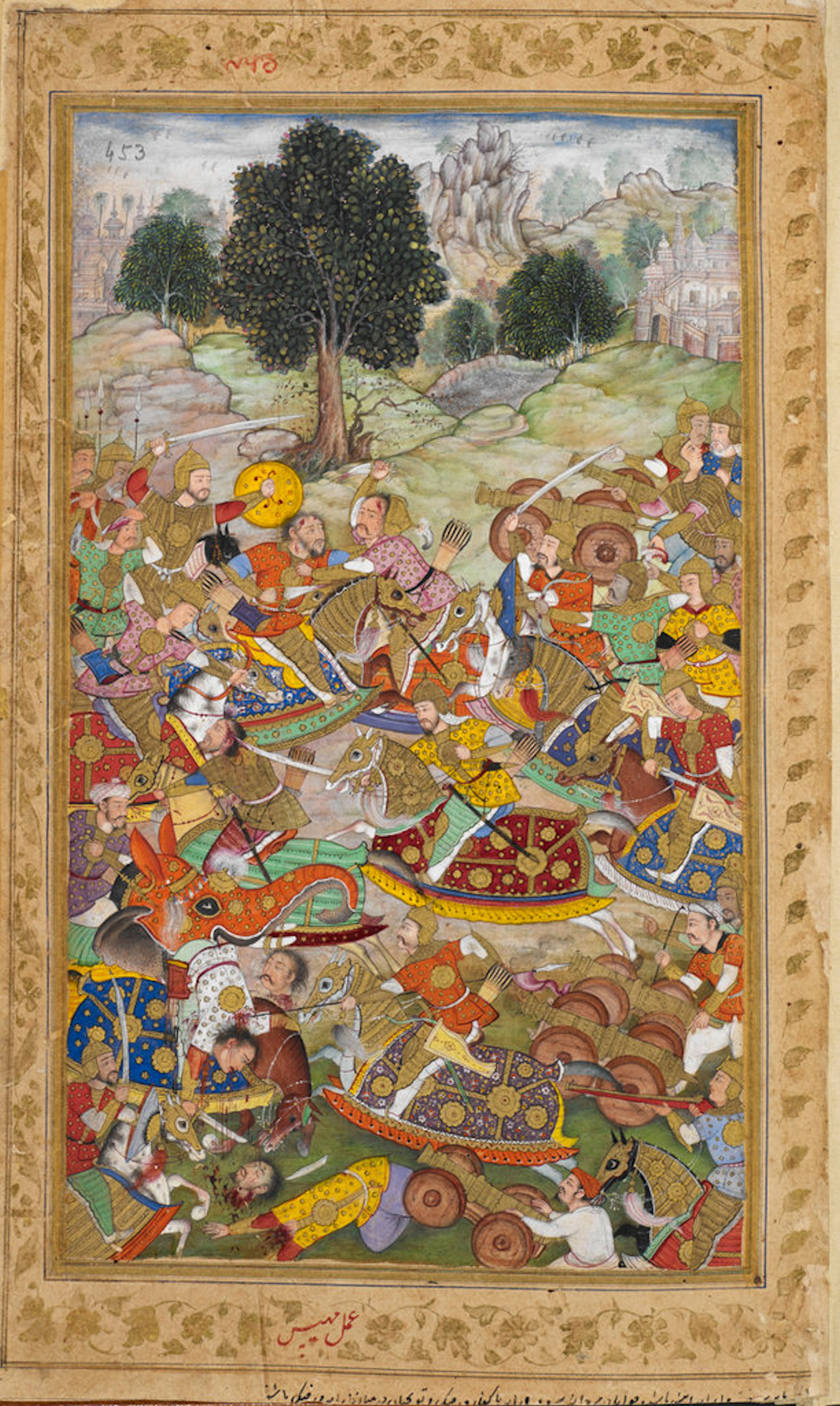
- Mughal painting depicting the Rajput Army (left) battling the Mughal Army (right)
Date	16 March 1527
Location	Khanwa, Rajasthan (near Fatehpur Sikri) 27°2′7″N 77°32′35″E
Result	Mughal victory
Territorial changes	Mughal imperial power established in North India by Babur and Agra became centre of their power.

Belligerents
Mughal Empire	Kingdom of Mewar Vassal states: Kingdom of Marwar; Kingdom of Amber; Kingdom of Vagad; Kingdom of Mewat; Kingdom of Shekhawati; Kingdom of Raisen; Kingdom of Chanderi; Bikaner State; Bundi State; Kotah State; Idar State; Tomaras of Gwalior; Other smaller Rajput states

Commanders and leaders
Babur Commanders: Humayun; Bairam Khan; Ustad Ali Quli; Mustafa Rumi; Chin Timur Khan; Mir Khalifa; Mir Abdul Aziz; Mir Muhammed Ali Khan; Khusrau Shah Kokultash; Kasim Husein Khan; Zaman Mirza; Askari Mirza; Hindal Mirza; Sayyid Mahdi Khawaja; Asad Malik Hast	Rana Sanga (WIA) Commanders: Prithviraj Kachwaha; Maldev Rathore; Kalyanmal Rathore; Uday Singh of Vagad †; Bharmal Rathore; Medini Rai; Hasan Khan Mewati †; Ratan Singh of Merta †; Manik Chand Chauhan †; Chandrabhan Chauhan †; Ratan Singh Chundawat †; Rao Kamdev Misir; Rao Dhamdev Misir; Raj Rana Ajja Jhala of Bari Sadri †; Haridas Kesaria †; Rao Ramdas; Gokaldas Parmar †; Rajrana Sajja Jhala of Delwara †; Silhadi (AWOL)

Strength
Total: 80,000 (According to Afshana-e-Shakan): 20,000 cavalry; Unknown number of foot musketeers, Swivel guns, mortars; Unknown number of Indian allies	Total: 110,000 (According to H.B. Sarda)

Casualties and losses
Heavy	Heavy
- Location within South Asia Battle of Khanwa (Rajasthan)

The Battle of Khanwa was fought at Khanwa in modern-day Rajasthan on 16 March 1527, between the Mughal Empire, led by Babur, and the Kingdom of Mewar, led by Rana Sanga for supremacy of Northern India. The battle ended in a Mughal victory and was a major event in medieval Indian history. The Kingdom of Mewar under the rule of Rana Sanga, had turned into one of the strongest powers in northern India. The battle was among the most decisive battles in the Mughal conquest of northern India. It was one of the first battles in Northern India where gunpowder was used. The battle resulted in heavy casualties for both Timurids and Rajputs.

== Background ==
Until 1524, Babur's aim was to expand his rule to Punjab, primarily to fulfil the legacy of his ancestor Timur, since it used to be part of his empire. Large parts of north India were under the rule of Ibrahim Lodi of the Lodi dynasty, but the empire was going through severe turmoil and there were many defectors. Babur had already raided Punjab in 1504 and 1518. In 1519 he tried to invade Punjab but had to return to Kabul due to complications there. In 1520–21 Babur again ventured to conquer Punjab, he easily captured Bhira and Sialkot which were known as the "twin gateways to Hindustan". Babur was able to annex towns and cities till Lahore but was again forced to stop due to rebellions in Qandhar. In 1523 he received invitations from Alam Khan Lodi, brother of Sikandar Lodi, Daulat Khan Lodi, Governor of Punjab and Ala-ud-Din, Ibrahim's uncle, to invade the Delhi Sultanate. Alam personally went to Babur's court and told him about the political situation of India. Babur agreed after sending some of his nobles to scout Punjab. These nobles, after studying the area, approved the plan to invade India. However, there were arguments between the Mughals and the Lodi rebels. Alam demanded that Babur give Delhi to him after it was conquered, as he was instrumental in inviting the Mughals to invade the Lodi Sultanate. Babur refused and thus Alam took his army to besiege Delhi by himself, where his army was defeated by Ibrahim Lodi. Daulat Khan also betrayed Babur and with a force of 40,000 he captured Sialkot from the Mughal garrison and marched towards Lahore. Daulat Khan was soundly defeated at Lahore and through this victory Babur became the unopposed lord of Punjab. Babur continued his conquest and annihilated the Lodi sultanate's army in the First Battle of Panipat, where he killed the Sultan and founded the Mughal Empire.

According to the Baburnama, Rana Sanga had also offered to help Babur against Ibrahim, however while Babur did attack Lodi and take over Delhi and Agra, Sanga made no move, apparently having changed his mind. Babur had resented this backsliding; in his autobiography, Babur accuses Rana Sanga of breaching their agreement. However Rajput sources claim the opposite and say that Sanga was successful against the Lodi Empire and did not require Babur's aid. Instead it was Babur who approached Rana Sanga and proposed an alliance against the Lodi Empire. Historian Satish Chandra speculates that Sanga may have imagined a long, drawn-out struggle taking place between Babur and Lodi, following which he would be able to take control of the regions he coveted. Alternatively, Sanga may have thought that in the event of a Mughal victory, Babur would withdraw from Delhi and Agra, like Timur, once he had seized the treasures of these cities. Once he realized that Babur intended to stay on in India, Sanga proceeded to build a grand coalition that would either force Babur out of India or confine him to Afghanistan. In early 1527, Babur started receiving reports of Sanga's advance towards Agra.

According to Jadunath Sarkar, Babur did not need an invitation to invade Hindustan. After establishing himself in Kabul, Babur had started making inroads into Punjab which was governed by Daulat Khan Lodi, a courtier of Ibrahim Lodi. Daulat was disloyal to his lord and formed an alliance with Babur against the Lodi Empire. This made it easy for Babur to enter Hindustan and oust both Daulat and Ibrahim.

Indologist Gopinath Sharma who is well known for his scholarly work on Mewar Kings and Mughal Empire rejected this theory of Rana Sanga sending his ambassador to Babur by providing various factual contemporary evidences. Sharma added that Sanga already established himself as the most powerful Hindu king of Northern India of that time, while Babur was yet to establish his reputation in India. Under those circumstances it was in Babur's interest to seek an alliance with perhaps his greatest and most powerful enemy of Northern India.

Sanga was praised by Babur quoting him as the one the five great ruler in India along with Krishnadevaraya of Vijaynagar empire.

== Preparations ==
After the First Battle of Panipat, Babur had recognized that his primary threat came from two allied quarters: Rana Sanga and the Afghans ruling eastern India at the time. In a council that Babur called, it was decided that the Afghans represented the bigger threat, and consequently Humayun was sent at the head of an army to fight the Afghans in the east. However, upon hearing of Rana Sanga's advancement on Agra, Humayun was hastily recalled.

Its difficult to assume the strength of Babur's army as neither the Rajput chronicles nor the Mughal ones talks about it. However, some medieval text had put Babur's strength about 80,000 men.

In order to oust Babur from Hindustan. Rana Sanga called his Rajput vassals to war and more than 120 chieftains from various parts of northern India responded. Further, Mahmud Lodi, the younger son of Sikandar Lodi, whom the Afghans had proclaimed their new sultan also joined Sangram with a contingent of Afghan horsemen with him. Khanzada Hasan Khan Mewati, the ruler of Mewat, also joined the alliance with his men. Babur denounced the Afghans who joined the alliance against him as kafirs and murtads (those who had apostatized from Islam). Different historians have conflicting view about the alliance.

According to historian Har Bilas Sarda, Rana Sanga had more than 110,000 soldiers under him including 10,000 adventurers from Mahmud Lodi.

== Initial skirmishes ==
Military detachments were then sent by Babur to conquer Dholpur, Gwalior, and Bayana. These areas also formed a part of Sanga's territories. However, Sanga was quick to respond and the force sent by Babur to Bayana was defeated at the Battle of Bayana. Gwalior and other places were also wrested back.

A 19th-century british historian, William Erskine, quotes:

They (Mughals) had some sharp encounters with the Rajputs, ... found that they had now to contend with a foe more formidable than the Afghans or any of the natives of India to whom they had yet been opposed. The Rajputs, ... were ready to meet, face to face,... all times prepared to lay down their lives for their honour.

Rana Sanga had defeated the Mughal contingents that were sent against him, this caused great fear in Babur's army as he has written "the fierceness and valour of the pagan army" made the troops "anxious and afraid". The Afghans in Baburs army started to leave and the Turks started complaining about defending a land that they hated, they requested Babur to leave to Kabul with the rich spoils that they had collected. Babur writes "no manly word or brave council was heard from any one soever". The greater numbers and reported courage of the Rajputs served to instil fear in Babur's army. An astrologer added to the general unease by his predictions. To raise the flagging morale of his soldiers, Babur gave a religious colour to the battle against Hindus. Babur proceeded to renounce future consumption of wine, broke his drinking cups, poured out all the stores of liquor on the ground and promulgated a pledge of total abstinence. In his autobiography, Babur writes that:

It was a really good plan, and it had a favourable propagandistic effect on friend and foe.

== Strategy ==
Sanga after capturing Bayana moved to north-east and took Bhusawar thus cutting Babur's supply line from Delhi and Kabul. His strategy was simple as by capturing Bayana and then Bhusawar he had cut off Babur's supplies while making his own preparations which forced Babur to discuss peace-overtures in which he proposed to set Bayana the boundary between themselves. However, acting upon the advice of his chiefs he rejected it. Thus, Sangram on battle day placed his trusted chiefs on centre and others on respective right and left. He thought of throwing the bulk of his army to enemy lines fighting head to head in which Rajput cavalry was unmatched.

On the other side, Babur knew that his army would have been swept by the Rajput charge if he tried to fight them in the open, he therefore planned a defensive strategy to form a fortified encampment where he would use his muskets and artillery to weaken his foes and then strike when their morale had shattered. Babur had carefully inspected the site. Like in Panipat, he strengthened his front by procuring carts that were fastened by iron chains (not leather straps, as at Panipat) and reinforced by mantlets. Gaps between the carts were used for horsemen to charge at the opponent at an opportune time. To lengthen the line, ropes made of rawhide were placed over wheeled wooden tripods. The flanks were given protection by digging ditches. Foot-musketeers, falconets and mortars were placed behind the carts, from where they could fire and, if required, advance. The heavy Turk horsemen stood behind them, two contingents of elite horsemen were kept in the reserve for the taulqama (flanking) tactic. Thus, a strong offensive-defensive formation had been prepared by Babur.

== Battle ==
Rana Sanga, fighting in a traditional manner, charged the Mughal ranks. His army was shot down in great numbers by the Mughal muskets, the noise of the muskets further caused fear amongst the horses and elephants of the Rajput army, causing them to trample their own men. Rana Sanga finding it impossible to attack the Mughal centre, ordered his men to attack the Mughal flanks, the fighting continued on the two flanks for three hours, during which the Mughals fired at the Rajput ranks with muskets and arrows while the Rajputs could only retaliate in close quarters. Babur writes:

Band after band of the Pagan troops followed each other to help their men, so we in our turn sent detachment after detachment to reinforce our fighters on that side.

Babur did make attempts to use his famous taulqama or pincer movement, however his men were unable to complete it, twice they pushed the Rajputs back however due to the relentless attacks of the Rajput horsemen they were forced to retreat to their positions. At about this time Silhadi of Raisen deserted the Ranas army and went over to Baburs. The betrayal of Silhadi forced the Rana to change his plans and issue new orders. According to some historians this betrayal never happened and was a later concoction. During this time the Rana was shot by a bullet and fell unconscious, causing great confusion in the Rajput army and a lull in the fighting for a short period. Babur has written this event in his memoirs by saying "the accursed infidels remained confounded for one hour". A Jhala chieftain called Ajja acted as the Rana and led the Rajput army, while the Rana was hidden within a circle of his trusted men. The Rajputs continued their attacks but failed to break the Mughal flanks and their centre was unable to do anything against the fortified Mughal centre, Jadunath Sarkar has explained the struggle in the following words:

In the centre the Rajputs continued to fall without being able to retaliate in the least or advance to close grips. They were hopelessly outclassed in weapon and their dense masses only increased their hopeless slaughter, as every bullet found its billet.

Babur after noticing the weak Rajput centre ordered his men to take the offensive, the Mughal attack pushed the Rajputs back and forced the Rajput commanders to rush to the front, resulting in the death of many. The Rajputs became leaderless as most of their senior commanders were dead and their unconscious king had been moved out of the battle. The Rajputs made a desperate charge on the Mughal left and right flanks like before, "here their bravest were mown down and the battle ended in their irretrievable defeat", dead bodies could be found as far as Bayana, Alwar and Mewat of both sides. The Mughals were too exhausted and had very heavy casualties after the long fight to give chase and Babur himself gave up the idea of invading Mewar.

Following this, Babur ordered a tower of enemy skulls to be erected, a practice formulated by Timur. According to Chandra, the objective of constructing a tower of skulls was not just to record a great victory, but also to terrorize opponents. Earlier, the same tactic had been used by Babur against the Afghans of Bajaur.

== Aftermath ==
Sanga was taken away from the battlefield in an unconscious state by Prithviraj Kachwaha and Maldev Rathore of Marwar. After regaining consciousness he took an oath to not return to Chittor until he had defeated Babur and ousted him. He also stopped wearing a turban and instead chose to wrap a cloth over his head. While he was preparing to wage another war against Babur, he was poisoned by his own nobles who did not want another conflict with Babur. He died in Kalpi in January 1528.

It is suggested that had it not been for the cannons and superior tactics of Babur, Rana Sanga might have achieved a historic victory against Babur. Pradeep Barua notes that Babur's cannon put an end to outdated trends in Indian warfare. After the battle, Babur made a pyramid using the heads of his enemies.

However it would be wrong to suppose that the Rajput power was crushed for ever, the power vacuum left by Rana Sanga was filled by Rao Maldeo Rathore. He took over the role as the leading Rajput king and dominated the time period after Sanga's death

== See also ==
- Battles of Rajasthan
- First Battle of Panipat
- Battle of Ghaghra

== Bibliography ==
- Sharma, Gopinath (1954). Mewar & the Mughal Emperors (1526–1707 A.D.). S.L. Agarwala.
- Chandra, Satish (2006). Medieval India: From Sultanat to the Mughals (1206–1526). Vol. 2. Har-Anand Publications. ISBN 9788124110669.
- Eraly, Abraham (2007). Emperors Of The Peacock Throne: The Saga of the Great Moghuls. Penguin Books Limited. ISBN 978-93-5118-093-7.
- Sarkar, Jadunath (1960). Military History of India. Orient Longmans. ISBN 978-0-86125-155-1.
- Wink, Andre (2012). Akbar. Simon and Schuster. ISBN 978-1-78074-209-0.
