= Khanwa =

- Village
- Location in Rajasthan, India Khanwa (India)
- Coordinates: 27°2′7″N 77°32′35″E
- Country: India
- State: Rajasthan
- District: Bharatpur

Languages
  - Official: Hindi, Rajasthani
- Time zone: UTC+5:30 (IST)
- Vehicle registration: RJ

Khanwa (also spelt Khanua) is a village in Bharatpur District of Rajasthan, lying about 35 km from city of Bharatpur, the district headquarter, 60 km west of the city of Agra in India. It was the site of a historic battle in the history of North India, and a few miles from Fatehpur Sikri.

== History ==
The Battle of Khanua was fought on 17 March 1527, between Babur, founder of the Mughal Empire, and the Rajput army led by Rana Sanga, king of Mewar.
