= Chin Timur Khan =

General of the Mughal Empire

Chin Timur Khan چین تیمور خان
- Born: Unknown; Samarkand, Timurid Empire (modern day Uzbekistan)
- Died: 1529; Kabul, Mughal Empire
- Burial place: Kabul
- Military career
- Allegiance: Mughal Empire
- Branch: Mughal army
- Service years: 1516-1529
- Rank: General
- Commands: Commander of Mobile guard Military governor of Kabul; Governor of Punjab
- Conflicts: Battle of Khanwa; Conquest of Afghanistan; Mughal raids into India; Conquest of Rajputs

Chin Timur Khan was a general of the Mughal Empire. He was a son of Babur's uncle Sultan Ahmad Alaq. He was in service of both Sultan Said Khan and Mansur Khan, but eventually fled to Babur's Mughal Empire in India. Timur was a commander in the service of Emperor Babur during his conquests. In 1526 he was sent by Babur with a number of other generals to quell an Afghan revolt, engaging in battle at Hisar. For his service to Babur Timur wa sawarded the town of Tijara and an allowance. At the Battle of Khanwa, he commanded the center wing, which was also led by the emperor in person.

Timur died of dysentery in Agra and was buried there.
