= Battle of Bayana =

1527 military conflict

- Part of Mughal–Rajput wars
| Date | 21 February 1527 |
| Location | Bayana (in present-day India) |
| Result | Mewar victory |
| Territorial changes | Bayana region captured by Rajput Forces |

Belligerents
| Kingdom of Mewar: Kingdom of Marwar; Kingdom of Amber; Kingdom of Vagad; Kingdom of Shekhawati; Kingdom of Raisen; Kingdom of Chanderi; Bikaner State; Bundi State; Kotah State; Idar State; Mewat State; Tomaras of Gwalior | Mughal Empire: Afghans of Bayana; Afghans of Dholpur; Afghans of Gwalior |

Commanders and leaders
| Rana Sanga; Prithviraj Singh I Maldev Rathore; Silhadi; Haridas Kesaria; Hasan Khan Mewati; Ajja Jhala; Jagmal Kacchwaha; Ratan Singh Chundawat; Medini Rai; Ramdas Songara; Raimal Rathore; Akhairaj Devda; Udai Singh of Dungarpur; Bagh Singh; Gokaldas Parmar; Naraindas Hada | Mir Abdul Aziz; Nizam Khan; Ustad Ali Khan; Alam Khan; Mahdi Khawaja; Shah Mansour Barlas |

The battle of Bayana or the siege of Bayana was a military land battle between the Kingdom of Mewar under Rana Sanga on one side and Mughals under Nizam Khan, led by Abdul Aziz on other side.

== Background ==
Mughal Emperor Babur's advance towards Delhi and Sanga's expansion towards Agra made war inevitable between the two kings. Babur's hostility towards Sanga is mentioned in his memoirs; in one instance, he accuses Rana Sanga of destroying Muslim control over 200 towns and displacing their ruling families. After his victory against the Lodi Empire, Babur wanted control of Bayana, which was an important fort to defend Agra against Sanga's advance. The fort of Bayana was under the Afghan chieftain Nizam Khan. By Babur's order, Ustad Ali Khan was given instructions to cast a monstrous cannon to bombard Bayana and other forts. Babur sent 2,500 men along with Afghans under Nizam Khan's brother Alam Khan to take the fort of Bayana, but Nizam Khan, with a numerically superior army, sallied forth from the fort and defeated the Mughal army and routed them. Since Rana Sanga was moving towards Babur, time was of the essence, and hence Babur called for the announcement of Jihad against the Rana and asked the Afghan chieftains of Bayana, Dholpur and Gwalior to join him in the holy war. The Afghan chieftains, along with Nizam Khan of Bayana, were intimidated by the military power of Rana Sanga and hence chose to accept Babur's overlordship.

== Battle and aftermath ==
Sanga besieged the fortress of Bayana in an organized manner. Sanga divided his army in four parts and put his trusted nobles in front. An attempt by the garrison to sally forth and fight ended in the rout of the Afghans and several of their officers were killed or wounded. The besieged lost morale and surrendered the fort to Rana. Babur sent an army under Abdul Aziz to prevent Rana from advancing, but the Mughals were defeated and scattered by the Rajputs under Rana Sanga. The defeat at Bayana further demoralised the Mughal forces and allowed Rana Sanga to safely march towards Khanwa (thirty-seven kilometres west of Agra), leading to the Battle of Khanwa.

Historian G.N. Sharma notes that: "Though Babur and the Mughal historians have not attached much importance to the battle of Bayana, it stands out as a last great triumph in the chequered career of Rana Sanga in whose hands now lay the forts of Chittor, Ranthambore, Khandar and Bayana, the key points of central Hindustan. The short and sharp encounters that the Mughals had to face at the hands of the Rajputs on this occasion, in which they had been severely handled sent a thrill of terror and discouragement in the Mughal army."
