= Rana Sanga's invasion of Gujarat =

1520 conflict part of Gujarat–Mewar Wars

Siege of tonk
- Part of Gujarat–Mewar Wars
Date	1520
Location	Gujarat, India
Result	Rajput victory
Territorial changes	Idar annexed by Rana Sanga and restored to Raimal Rathore

Belligerents
Kingdom of Mewar; Vassal states: Kingdom of Marwar; Idar State; Kingdom of Vagad	Gujarat Sultanate

Commanders and leaders
Rana Sanga; Rao Ganga; Ajja Jhala; Rawal Udai Singh of Vagad; Rao Viram deo Rathore of Merta; Rai Mal Rathore; Haridas Kesaria	Nizam-ul-Mulk (WIA)

Strength
Total: 62,000 Rajputs cavalry: Mewar: 40,000; Marwar: 12,000; Vagad: 10,000	Unknown

In 1520 Rana Sanga, the Rana of Mewar, led Rajput armies of Kingdom of Mewar and its vassal states to invade the Gujarat Sultanate. He reinstated Raimal Rathore as the Rao of Idar and defeated the Gujarat forces under the command of Nizam Khan. Rana Sanga drove the army of Muzaffar II deep into Gujarat and chased them up to Ahmedabad. The Sultan of Gujarat was forced to flee to Muhammadabad.

== Background ==
The growing power of Mewar was seen as a threat by the Sultan of Gujarat. They had previously disputes due to the succession of the state of Idar and Malwa. In 1519 the two claimants of Idar, Raimal and Bharmal both sought the support of Rana Sanga and Muzaffar II. Rana Sanga had placed his son-in-law, Raimal, on the throne of Idar. But the Gujarati forces expelled him placing Bharmal at Idar.

== Battle of Ahmednagar ==
Upon knowing of the invasion, Rana Sanga immediately came to the support of Raimal Rathore and started with 40,000 cavalry from Chittorgarh. He first went towards Sirohi whose ruler paid necessary tribute to the Maharana. When Sultan of Gujarat came to know about the developments happened above. He tried to send reinforcements but he was stopped by his nobles who were anxious of Mubariz-ul-Mulk, then holding Idar for Gujarat Sultanate. Next, Maharana's army reached Dungarpur whose ruler also accompanied him. Mubariz-ul-Mulk wrote letter to Sultan asking for counterattack and also informing him about the present situation. However, nobles mis-interpreted the fact and stopped Sultan from taking necessary action. Then a battle was fought in Idar where the Sultans forces were defeated by the Maharana. Idar was captured and forces of Marwar and Vagad under their respective Kings Rao Ganga Rathore and Biramdeva Medatiya with 7000 and 6,000 cavalry each joined him. Gujarat army were pushed back as far as Ahmedabad which was put to siege and looted. Mewari army plundered and captured Vadnagar and also attacked Visalnagar which also submitted to Maharana.

== Aftermath ==
This defeat led to the alliance between the sultanates of Gujarat, Malwa and Delhi against Mewar. The two Sultans of Malwa and Gujarat led their forces to Mandsaur where they failed to take the fort and were forced to retreat. The sultan of Delhi tried to annex Ajmer but was defeated at Ranthambore by Sanga.

== Bibliography ==
- Habib, Mohammad; Nizami, Khaliq Ahmad (1970). A Comprehensive History of India. Vol. 5, Part 2. People's Publishing House.
- Haig, W. (1928). The Cambridge History of India: Turks and Afghans, edited by W. Haig. Vol. III. Cambridge University Press.
- Majumdar, Ramesh Chandra (1960). The History and Culture of the Indian People. Vol. 6. Bharatiya Vidya Bhavan.
- Chaube, J. (1975). History of Gujarat Kingdom, 1458-1537. Munshiram Manoharlal Publishers. ISBN 978-0-88386-573-6.
