= Muzaffar Shah II =

Sultan of Gujarat from 1511 to 1526

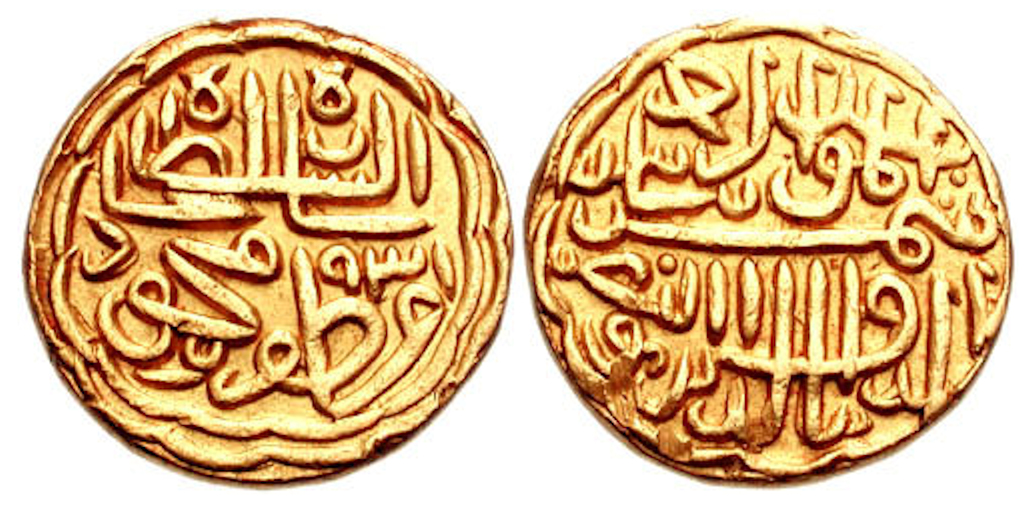
- Coinage of Shams al-Din Muzaffar Shah II (1511-1525).

8th Sultan of Gujarat
- Vizier: Rashid‑ul‑Mulk
- Reign: 27 November 1511 – 5 April 1526
- Predecessor: Mahmud Begada
- Successor: Sikandar Shah
- Born: 6 December 1475
- Died: 5 April 1526 (aged 50); Ahmedabad
- Burial: Sarkhej Roza
- Queen: Bibi Rani; Rani Rajbai; Rani Lakshmibai
- Issue: Sikandar Khan; Bahadur Khan; Latif Khan; Chand Khan; Ibrahim Khan; Nasir Khan; 2 more sons Ayesha Bibi; Ruqayya Bibi
Names
- Shams-ud-Dīn Muzaffar Shah II
- Dynasty: Muzaffarid
- Father: Mahmud Begada
- Mother: Hirabai
- Religion: Islam
- Military career
- Service years: c. 1487–1511
- Conflicts: Sack of Kuva (1487); Idar war of succession (1515–1520); Siege of Mandu (1518)

Shams-ud-Din Muzaffar Shah II (born Khalil Khan; 6 December 1475 – 5 April 1526), also known as Muzafar II and The Clement, was a Sultan of the Muzaffarid dynasty, who reigned over the Gujarat Sultanate from 1511 to 1526. He was the fourth son of Sultan Mahmud Begada, and succeeded his father upon his death.

== Early life ==
Khalil Khan was born as the fourth son of Mahmud Begada, sultan of Gujarat, from his wife, Rani Hirabai, the daughter of Naga Rana, a Rajput chief on the banks of the river Mahi. His mother died a few days after giving birth to him, and thus he was brought up in the care of his step-grandmother, Hansa Bai. After the funeral of the late Sultan were completed, he ascended the throne on Friday, 7 Ramzan 917 AH corresponding to 27 November 1511. He assumed the title of Muzaffar Shah.

== Reign ==
Rashid‑ul‑Mulk was granted the title Khudawand Khan and appointed vizier. Other leading nobles of the court received honorific titles: Khush Kadam titled Mukhlis Khan, Malik Burhan titled Mansur Khan, Malik Qutb was titled Azd‑ul‑Mulk, Malik Mubarak titled Iftikhar‑ul‑Mulk, Nasir Shadi titled Mubariz‑ul‑Mulk, Malik Sheikhji titled Tarid‑ul‑Mulk, and Malik Shah titled Rukn‑ul‑Mulk.

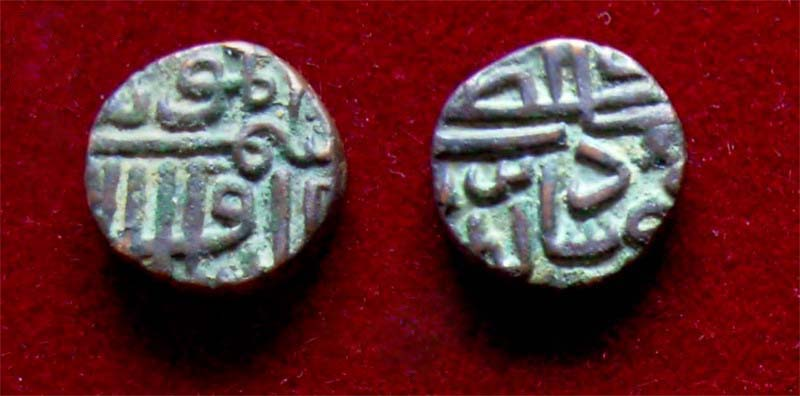
Copper coin of Muzaffar Shah II

=== First Idar campaign (1515) ===
For some time before his father's death, Prince Khalil Khan had been living at Baroda (now Vadodara), and shortly after his accession, he visited that neighbourhood and founded a town named Daulatabad. In 1515, Rao Bhim, the son of Rao Bhan of Idar State, defeated Ain-ul-Mulk, governor of Patan, who was coming to Ahmedabad to pay his respects to the king. The officer had turned aside to punish Rao for some disturbance he had created, but failing in his purpose, was himself defeated. When Muzaffar Shah approached, Rao abandoned Idar and made peace by agreeing to pay a heavy tribute. Meanwhile, the king marched to Godhra, and then to Malwa via Dahod and soon after went on to Dhar.

=== Second Idar campaign (1517) ===
After a short stay in Malwa, seeking to take advantage of the distracted condition of Mahmud of Malwa, who was at war with his nobles, Muzaffar returned to Muhammadabad (Champaner). At this time, Raimal, nephew of the late Rao Bhim of Idar, expelled the Rao's son Bharmal with the aid of his father-in-law, Rana Sanga of Chittor and succeeded to the chieftainship of Idar.

The king was displeased at the interference of the Rana, and directed Nizam Khan, the governor of Ahmednagar (now Himatnagar), to expel Raimal and reinstate Bharmal. Nizam Khan took Idar and gave it to Bharmal. Raimal betook himself to the hills where Nizam Khan, incautiously pursuing and engaging him, lost many men.

The Sultan visited Idar. Shortly after, Nizam Khan, the governor of Ahmednagar, fell sick and was called to court. He left Idar in charge of Zahir-ul-Mulk at the head of a hundred horse. Raimal made a sudden raid on Idar and killed Zahir-ul-Mulk and twenty-seven of his men. On hearing this, Muzaffar Shah II ordered Nizam Khan to destroy Bijapur.

=== Campaign of Malwa (1518) ===
In 1517, the nobles of Malwa sought Muzaffar Shah's interference, alleging that the minister Medini Rai was planning to depose the Malwa Sultan, Mahmud Khilji II, and usurp the throne. Muzaffar Shah promised to come to their help, and shortly after, Sultan Mahmud Khilji, escaping from the surveillance of Medani Rai, himself sought the aid of the Gujarat monarch. In 1518, Muzaffar Shah marched by Godhra into Malwa, and on his arrival at Dhar, that town was evacuated by Medani Rai. The king besieged Mandu, and Medani Rai summoned the Chittor Rana to his aid. When the Rana reached Sarangpur, Muzaffar Shah detached a force caused the Rana to retire, while the Khan's soldiers exerted themselves so strenuously that they captured Mandu, recovering the girdle which Qutb-ud-dIn Ahmad Shah II had lost at the battle of Kapadvanj. This conquest virtually placed Malwa in Muzaffar's power, but he honourably restored the kingdom to Sultan Mahmud Khilji, and withdrew from Gujarat, proceeded to Muhammadabad.

In 1519, news was received of the defeat and capture of Sultan Mahmud Khilji by the Rana of Chittor. Muzaffar Shah sent a force to protect Mandu. But, the Rana, who distinguished himself by releasing the Sultan of Malwa and keeping his son in his stead as a hostage, enjoyed continued good fortune.

=== Rana Sanga's invasion of Gujarat (1520) ===
In 1520, Rana Sanga invaded Idar to restore his son-in-law Raimal to the throne and to punish Mubariz-ul-Mulk, the governor of Idar, who had insulted him by chaining a dog named after the Rana at the fort gate. Leading a combined force of around 52,000 troops alongside regional allies like Rao Ganga of Marwar, Sanga easily captured Idar against a small Gujarati garrison, reinstated Raimal. He demolished a local mosque to build a Hindu temple, and advanced toward Ahmadnagar. In the ensuing battle of Ahmednagar Sanga's overwhelming forces completely surrounded the enemy. Key Gujarati commanders were slain, and a severely wounded Mubariz-ul-Mulk fled toward Ahmedabad. The victory was total as the Rajputs captured and sacked both Ahmadnagar and Visnagar, spared the Brahmin-populated town of Vadnagar before Sanga successfully concluded his campaign and returned to Chittor.

=== Invasion of Mewar (1520–1521) ===
In January 1521, Muzaffar Shah II dispatched an army of 100,000 horsemen and 100 elephants, led by Malik Ayaz, the governor of Sorath, to punish the Rana for his incursion into Gujarat. The towns of Bakor, Galiakot, Dungarpur, Sagwara, and Banswara were pillaged and left in ruins. In Banswara, a sizable Hindu force hiding in ambush was attacked and driven off after sustaining casualties. Following this, Malik Ayaz advanced to Mandsaur and laid siege to the town. Rana Sangrama moved to relieve Mandsaur, but kept a distance of twenty miles from the Muslim camp. He sent emissaries to Malik Ayaz, offering tribute to Muzaffar Shah II in exchange for lifting the siege, but his plea was disregarded. Mahmud Khalji II later joined forces with Malik Ayaz, and Mandsaur might have been captured and Sangrama defeated. However, a misunderstanding arose, causing apprehension that Malik Dawam-ul-Mulk, an amir of Gujarat, might unjustly claim all credit for the anticipated victory over Rana Sanga. Consequently, despite resistance from the other amirs who harboured grievances against Malik Ayaz, when Rana Sanga dispatched a messenger offering vassalage to the Sultan, he willingly acquiesced to the terms of peace proposed by the Rajput ruler. Shortly afterwards, on the death of Malik Ayaz, Muzaffar Shah II confirmed his elder son Malik Is-hak in his father's rank and possessions. Malik Is-hak remained in Sorath, which was confirmed as his jagir. In the following year, the Sultan went about his dominions strengthening his frontier posts, especially the fort of Modasa, which he rebuilt.

== Death and succession ==
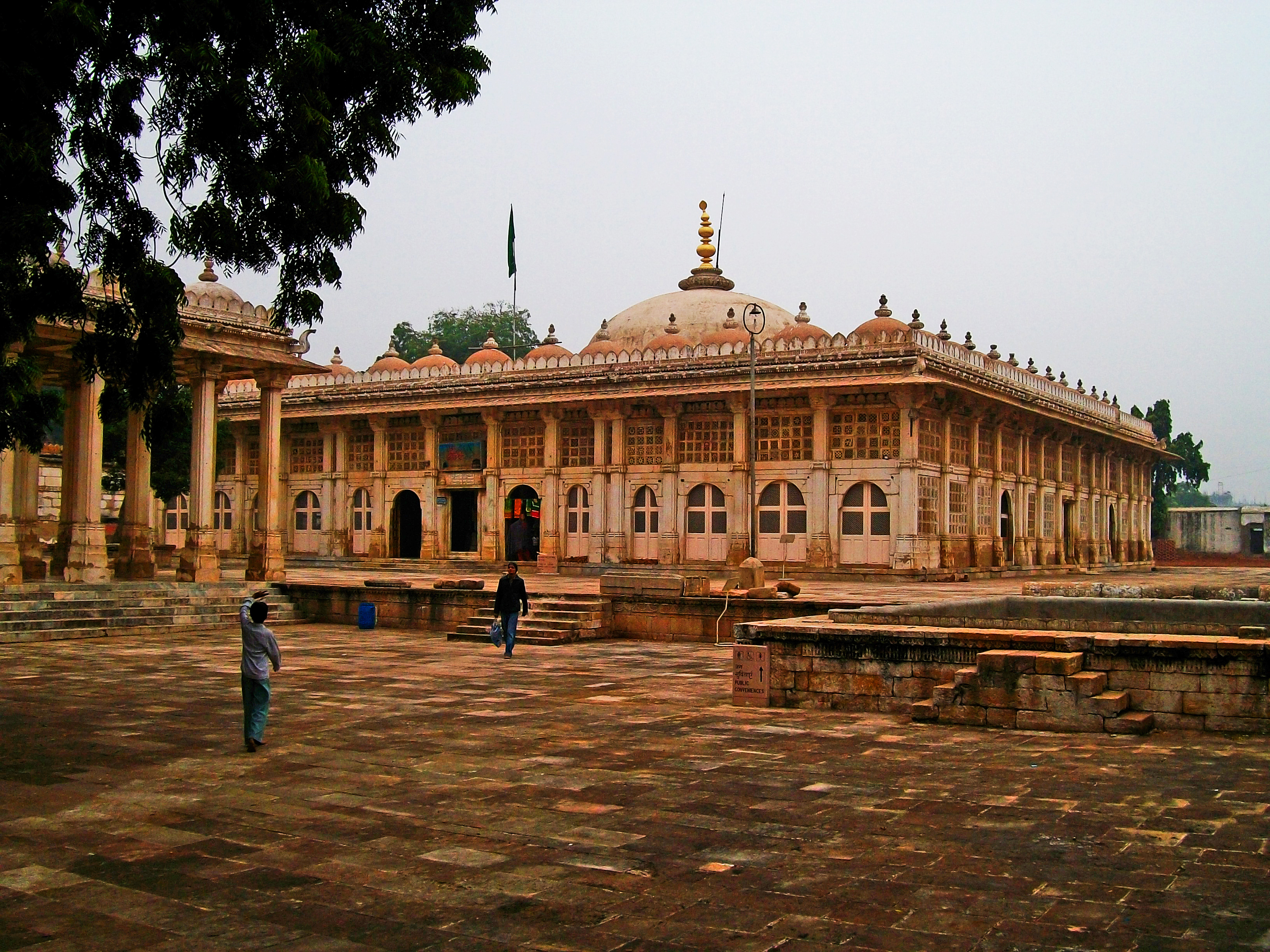
The shrine of Sheikh Ahmed Khattu at Sarkhej Roza where Muzaffar Shah II was buried.

Muzaffar Shah II, after formally appointing his son Sikandar Khan his heir, died at Ahmedabad on 5 April 1526 at the age of 51, after a reign of fourteen years and nine months. Before his death, he travelled from Champaner to Baroda and then to Ahmedabad and lived at the palace at Kankaria lake. He left eight sons and two daughters.

Muzaffar Shah was buried in the shrine of Sheikh Ahmed Khattu at Sarkhej Roza near his father's grave. After Sikandar Shah had been in power for a few months, he was murdered by Imad-ul-Mulk Khush Kadam, who seated a younger brother of Sikandar's, named Nasir Khan, on the throne with the title of Mahmud Shah II and governed on his behalf.

The singular event of Sikandar's reign was the destruction of an army sent against his brother Latif Khan who was helped by Rana Bhim of Munga (now Chhota Udaipur). The nobles deserted Imad-ul-Mulk's cause, and prince Bahadur Khan, returning to Gujarat, was joined by many supporters such as Taj Khan, the proprietor of Dhandhuka. Bahadur Khan marched to Champaner, captured and executed Imad-ul-Mulk, poisoned Nasir Khan, and ascended the throne in 1527 with the title of Bahadur Shah.

== Foreign relations ==
=== Safavid Empire ===
In January 1512, Mirza Yadgar Beg, ambassador of Shah Ismail of Persia, arrived in Gujarat. Muzaffar Shah received the envoy warmly. The ambassador met the Sultan, presented gifts, and in return received robes of honour. The exchange strengthened diplomatic ties between Gujarat and Iran, after which Mirza Yadgar Beg returned to his country.

=== Portuguese ===
In early 1514, the Portuguese general, Afonso de Albuquerque, sent ambassadors to Muzaffar Shah II to seek permission to build a fort on Diu Island. Although this mission returned without any agreement, diplomatic gifts were exchanged, including an Indian rhinoceros named Genda. Alfonso further passed on Genda along with its Indian keeper to King Manuel I of Portugal. This gift caused quite a sensation in King Manuel's kingdom as nobody had seen a living rhinoceros in Europe. In late 1515, Manuel further sent Genda as a gift to Pope Leo X in Rome, but the ship carrying the animal capsized. The memory of the rhino lived on due to the works of the artist Albrecht Dürer.

== Family ==
Muzaffar Shah is known to have eight sons and two daughters:

- Sikandar Khan, his oldest son, who succeeded his father as Sikandar Shah of Gujarat. He was the son of Bibi Rani, Muzaffar's chief queen.
- Bahadur Khan, who succeeded his older brother as Sultan Bahadur Shah of Gujarat. His mother was Rani Lakshmi Bai, the daughter of a Gohel Rajput.
- Latif Khan. His mother was Rani Rajbai. He rebelled against Bahadur Shah and died during the rebellion. His son Mahmud later succeeded to the throne of Gujarat.
- Chand Khan. He was born of a concubine and fled to Mandu upon Bahadur Shah's ascension. After Bahadur's conquest of Malwa, Chand Khan fled to the Deccan.
- Ibrahim Khan, born of a concubine. He was poisoned by Bahadur Shah.
- Nasir Khan, who was briefly placed on the throne by Imad-ul-Mulk after Sikandar Shah's assassination as Mahmud Shah II of Gujarat. He was five or six years of age upon his ascension and was poisoned in 1527.
- Two more sons, born of concubines, and poisoned on Bahadur Shah's orders.
- Ayesha Bibi, daughter of Bibi Rani. She was married to Majlis-i-Sami Fateh Khan, a prince of Sindh.
- Ruqayya Bibi, daughter of Bibi Rani. She was married to Adil Khan Faruqi of Khandesh, and her son Miran Muhammad Shah I succeeded Bahadur Shah as Sultan of Gujarat.

== Bibliography ==
- Dosabhai, Edalji (1986) [1894]. A History of Gujarat (PDF). Kessinger Publishing. ISBN 978-1-4367-3303-8.
- Chaube, J. (1975). History of Gujarat Kingdom, 1458-1537. Munshiram Manoharlal Publishers. ISBN 978-0-88386-573-6.
- Commissariat, M. S. (1938). A History of Gujarat, including a survey of its chief architectural monuments and inscriptions. Bombay: Longmans, Green & Co.
- Rajyaghor, S. B. (1974). Gazetteers: Sabarkantha District. Directorate of Government Print., Stationery and Publications.
