= Bakor =

- Village
- Location in Gujarat, India
- Coordinates: 22.820862°N 73.747786°E
- Country: India
- State: Gujarat
- District: Mahisagar
- Taluka: Khanpur
- Named for: Bakasur

Government
  - Type: Gram Panchayat, Taluka Panchayat

Population (2011)
  - Total: 3,095

Languages
  - Official: Gujarati, Hindi
- Time zone: UTC+5:30 (IST)
- PIN: 389232
- Vehicle registration: GJ-35

Bakor is a village situated in Middle East area of Gujarat state of India. It is a capital of Khanpur Taluka of The Mahisagar district having maximum population of Adivasis, Patels and Brahmins. Main business of people of village is Agriculture, Agriculture Labour and Animal husbandry. Main crop of the village are Maize, Wheat, Pearl millet, Pigeon pea and Vegetable. The village is having facilities of Gram panchayat, Kindergarten and Primary school.

== Geography ==
Bakor village is near to the historical place Kaleshwari which is 4 km from the village.
