= Rana Sanga =

Maharana of Mewar from 1509 to 1528

Sangram Singh I
- Maharana; Hindupati
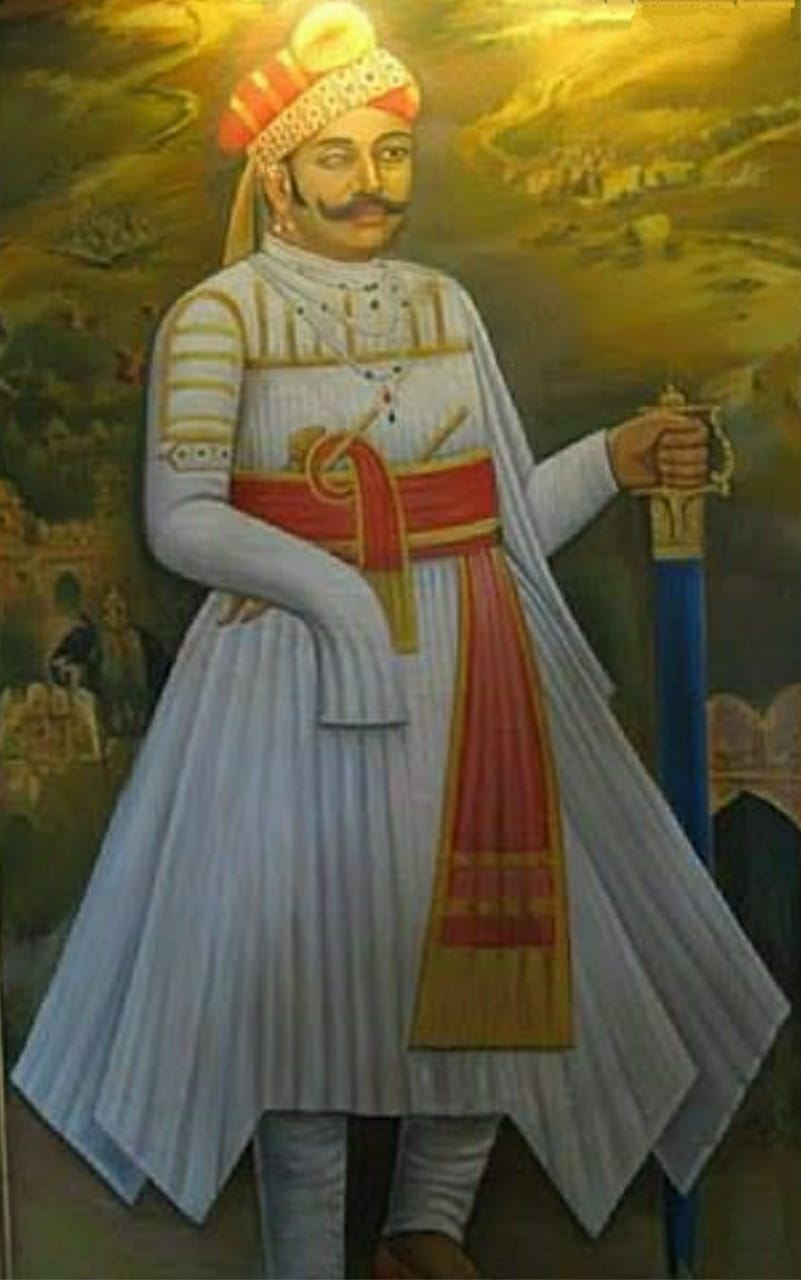
- Painting of Rana Sanga in the Udaipur Museum

Rana of Mewar
- Reign: 24 May 1509 – 30 January 1528
- Coronation: 24 May 1509
- Predecessor: Raimal Singh
- Successor: Ratan Singh II
- Born: 12 April 1482; Chittor, Kingdom of Mewar (present-day Rajasthan, India)
- Died: 30 January 1528 (aged 45); Kalpi (present-day Uttar Pradesh, India)
- Spouse: Rani Karnavati
- Issue: Bhoj Raj; Ratan Singh; Vikramaditya; Udai Singh II
Names
- Sangram Singh
Era dates
- 15th and 16th centuries
Regnal name
- Maharana Sangram Singh
- House: Sisodia dynasty
- Father: Rana Raimal
- Mother: Rani Ratan Jhali
- Religion: Hinduism
- Military career
- Conflicts: See list: Mewar-Malwa conflicts; Gagron (1519); Mewar-Gujarat conflicts; Idar (1515–20); Gujarat (1520); Gujarati invasion (1520–1521); Mandsaur (1521); Mewar-Delhi Conflicts; Khatoli (1517); Dholpur (1519); Siege of Ranthambore (1521); Mughal–Rajput wars; Bayana (1527); Khanwa (1527) (WIA)

Sangram Singh I (Mewari pronunciation: [səŋɡɾaːm sɪ̃ɳ]; 12 April 1482 – 30 January 1528), most commonly known as Rana Sanga, was the Maharana of Mewar from 24 May 1509 until his death in 1528. A member of the Sisodia dynasty, he controlled parts of present-day Rajasthan, Gujarat, Madhya Pradesh, Haryana, Sindh, and Uttar Pradesh from his capital at Chittorgarh.

During his military career, Sanga was successful against several neighbouring sultanates. After the 1519 Battle of Gagron against the Malwa Sultanate, he captured much of eastern Malwa. He humbled the Sultan of Gujarat several times. Sanga also had the Khanzadas of Mewat as vassals, helping them extend their sway over modern-day Haryana. Among his victories were those against the Lodi dynasty of Delhi at Khatoli, Dholpur, and Ranthambore, enabling Sanga to capture much of the Lodi domain in southern Malwa and western Uttar Pradesh.

At its zenith in 1521, Sanga's empire stretched from Mandu (the capital of Malwa Sultanate) in the south to Peela Khal (Pilya Khal, a small rivulet near Bayana and Agra) in the northeast, to the Indus River in the west and north-west. Nearly all the Rajput chiefs owed allegiance to him. Sanga also marched against the invading forces of Babur, who founded the Mughal Empire. Despite initial success against Mughal-Afghan forces at the Battle of Bayana, he experienced a significant defeat at Khanwa (primarily due to Babur's use of gunpowder, unknown in northern India at the time).

Sanga is considered the greatest ruler of his time. Said to have won 18 battles against the sultans of Delhi, Malwa and Gujarat, he is renowned for his heroism and leadership. Sanga received more than 80 wounds in battle; he lost an eye and an arm, and one of his legs was crippled. He is considered the last independent Hindu sovereign of northern India to control extensive territory. His reign was admired by Babur, the first Mughal emperor who described him as the "greatest Indian ruler" of that time; Babur also accused him of sending an invitation to invade India, a claim that has not been widely accepted. Mughal historian Abd al-Qadir Badayuni called Sanga the bravest of all Rajputs with Prithviraj Chauhan, also known as Rai Pithaura.

== Early life and accession ==
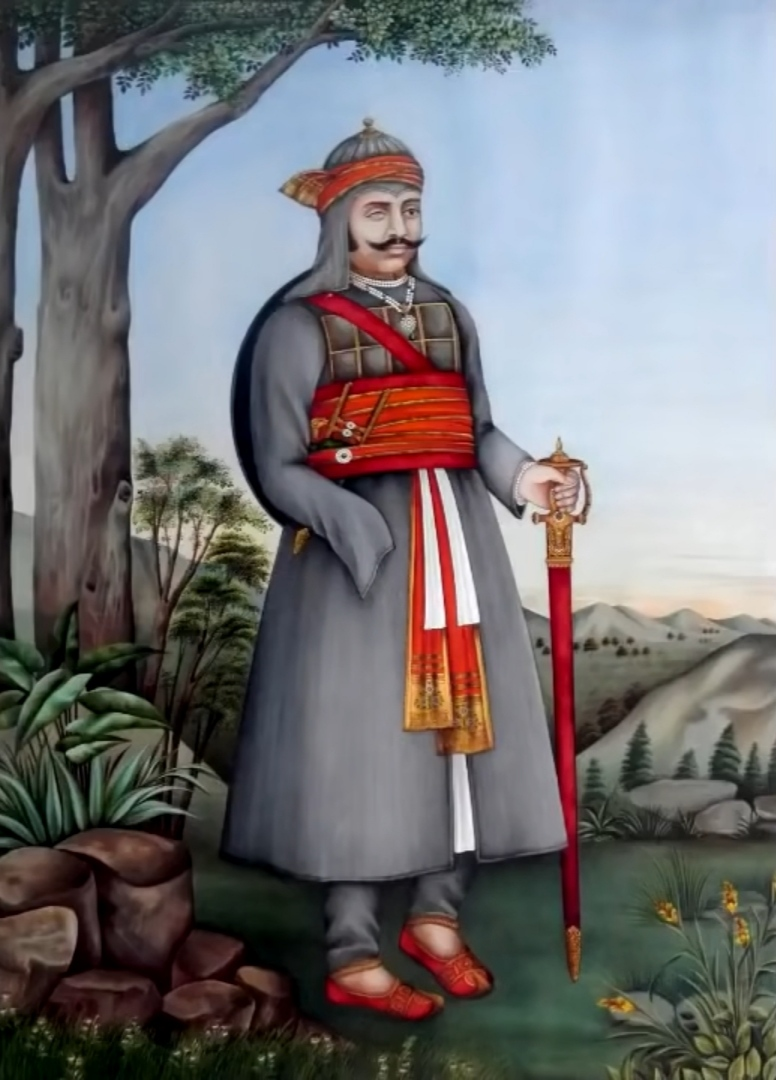
Depiction of Rana Sanga in 1950

Sanga was born to King Raimal and Queen Ratan Kunwar, a Jhala princess from Halvad. Although contemporary texts did not mention the year of his birth, they provided astrological planetary positions at the time of his birth and called them auspicious. Based on these positions, assuming other planetary positions and based on the Kumbhalgarh inscription, historian Gaurishankar Hirachand Ojha calculated Sanga's birth year as 1482.

Sanga was Raimal's third son. After a struggle with his brothers Prithviraj and Jagmal, in which he lost an eye, he ascended the throne of Mewar in 1509.

== Military career ==
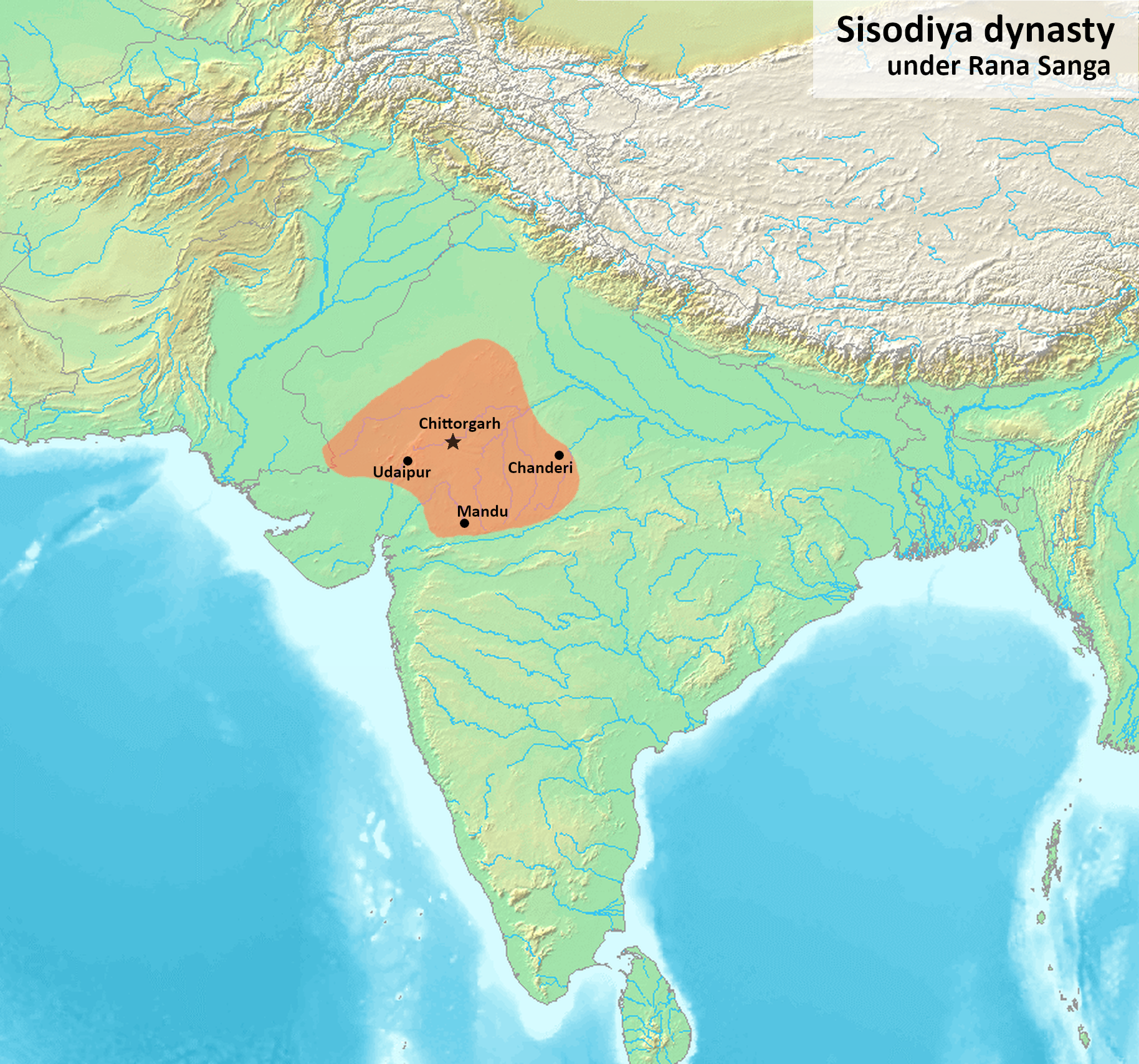
The Kingdom of Mewar at its greatest extent under the Sisodiya dynasty, during the reign of Rana Sanga

Sanga defeated the sultans of Delhi, Malwa and Gujarat in eighteen battles, conquering much of present-day Rajasthan, Madhya Pradesh and northern Gujarat. He also controlled portions of Haryana, Uttar Pradesh and Amarkot. After his rise to the throne, Sanga reunited the warring clans of Rajputana through diplomacy and marriage. In his Baburnama, Babur noted the challenges he faced in India. He described Sanga as the greatest infidel king of Hindustan, with Krishnadevaraya of southern India's Vijayanagara Empire: "Sanga had recently grown so great by his audacity and sword that his kingdom included a significant portion of northern India."

According to legend, Sanga fought 100 battles and lost only one. His leg was crippled, and he received eighty wounds in war. India's Rajputs saw him as their leader against the sultanates, and he re-established Rajput rule in Malwa for the first time since the fall of the Paramara dynasty in 1305.

Sanga removed the jizya tax from the Hindus, which had been imposed by Muslim rulers. He is considered the last independent Hindu king of northern India to control significant territory, and was described in contemporary texts as "Hindu Emperor".

=== Invasion of Malwa ===
Medini Rai, a rebellious minister of the Malwa sultan, was struggling with Mahmud for the throne of Malwa and was promised aid by Rana Sanga. The combined sultanate forces of Gujarat and Malwa met the Sisodias, led by Sanga, at Gagron. The battle was a Rajput victory.

After victory in the battle and other skirmishes, Sanga captured eastern and northern Malwa and Chanderi. Rai made Chanderi his capital, and Silhaditya Tomar established himself as ruler of Raisen and the Sarangpur region. According to historian Satish Chandra, these events occurred between 1518 and 1519. After the victory and establishment of Hindu rule in eastern and northern Malwa, Sanga ordered Rai to remove the Jizya tax from the region's Hindus.

=== Wars against the Lodis ===
Sanga turned his attention towards northeastern Rajasthan, controlled by Delhi sultan Ibrahim Lodi, after conquering Malwa. Lodi, after hearing about encroachments by Sanga on his territory, prepared an army and marched against Mewar in 1517. Sanga and his army met Lodi at Khatoli on the border of Hadoti. In the ensuing battle at Khatoli, the Lodi army had serious reverses and fled; one Lodi prince was captured and imprisoned. In this battle, Sanga lost an arm and an arrow made him lame for life.

Lodi, reportedly stunned by the Rajput aggression (whose extent was unprecedented in the preceding three centuries), again moved against Mewar in 1518-19 but was defeated again in the battle of Dholpur. Lodi fought Sanga repeatedly and was defeated each time, losing his land in present-day Rajasthan; Sanga's influence extended to nearPilia Khar in Agra. According to the 16th-century text Parshvanath-Shravan-Sattavisi, Sanga defeated Lodi at Ranthambore after the Siege of Mandsaur.

=== Campaign in Gujarat ===
The three battles of Idar were fought between the armies of its two princes: Bhar Mal (supported by the Gujarat Sultanate under Muzaffar Shah II) and Rai Mal, supported by the Rajputs under Rana Sanga. The main reason for Sanga's involvement in these battles was to reinstate Rai Mal to his throne and weaken the growing power of the Gujarat Sultanate. Rai Mal, assisted by Rana Sanga, defeated Muzzafar Shah II in 1517 and retook his kingdom.

In 1520, Sanga invaded Gujarat because of the succession of the state of Idar with an army of 40,000 Rajputs supported by his three vassals. Rao Ganga Rathore of Marwar also joined him with a garrison of 8,000 Rajputs. Sanga's other allies were Rawal Udai Singh of Vagad and Rao Viram of Merta. He defeated the Muslim army of Nizam Khan and pursued them to Ahmedabad. Sanga called off his invasion 20 miles before the capital, Ahmedabad. He plundered the royal treasuries of Gujarat, destroying several mosques and building temples over them. After a series of victories, Sanga annexed Idar and appointed Raimal Rathore as a vassal to rule it.

=== War against the Mughals ===
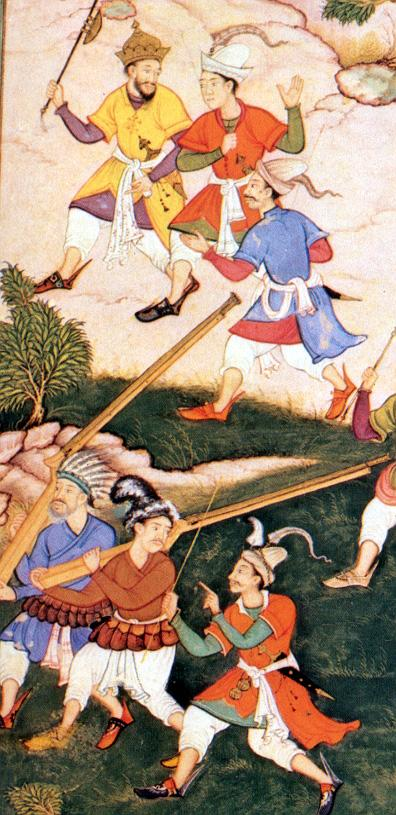
Early matchlocks from the Timurid dynasty

On 21 April 1526, the Timurid king Babur invaded India for the fifth time, defeated Ibrahim Lodhi in the First Battle of Panipat, and executed him. After the battle, Sanga united several Rajput clans for the first time since the Prithviraj Chauhan era, built an army of 100,000 Rajput soldiers, and advanced to Agra.

The Mughals captured Bayana's fort, which was part of Sanga's empire. In the February 1527 Battle of Bayana, he defeated Babur's Mughal forces (led by Abdul Aziz) for his final victory. He sought divine favour by forbidding liquor, breaking wine vessels and pouring the wine down a well. In the 16 March Battle of Khanwa, 37 miles (60 km) west of Agra, the Mughals were victorious due to their cannons, matchlocks and other firearms. Sanga was struck by an arrow in mid-battle and was removed, unconscious, by his brother-in law Prithviraj Kachwaha of Amber and prince Maldev Rathore. Following his victory, Babur ordered a tower of enemy skulls – a practice used by Timur. According to Chandra, the objective of a tower of skulls was to record a great victory and terrorise opponents; the tactic had been used by Babur against the Afghans of Bajaur. Sanga was betrayed by Silhadi during the battle, who changed sides and joined Babur.

The Mughal victory is seen as a landmark event in the Mughal conquest of North India, more significant than the First Battle of Panipat; it made Babur the master of North India, crushing the Rajput clans. According to historian Andre Wink, the centre of Mughal power became Agra (instead of Kabul) after the victory at Khanwa and remained so until it fell after Ālamgir's death. Without Babur's cannons (which ended outdated Indian warfare), Sanga might have prevailed. Babur stopped further invading Rajasthan, Rajput forces encamped at Baswa (near Dausa) for Sanga's treatment, and Sanga soon began preparation of another war against Babur.

== Death and succession ==
Sanga was removed unconscious from the battlefield by his brother-in-law, Prithviraj Singh of Amber, and Maldeo Rathore of Marwar. After regaining consciousness he took an oath to not return to Chittor until he defeated Babur and conquered Delhi, and stopped wearing a turban. Preparing for another war against Babur, he was poisoned by nobles who did not want more conflict. He died in Kalpi in January 1528 or on 20 May of that year and was succeeded by his son, Ratan Singh II.

After Sanga's defeat, his vassal Medini Rai was defeated by Babur at Chanderi and Babur captured the Rai capital. Rai refused an offer of Shamsabad instead of Chanderi, and chose to die fighting. The Rajput women and children immolated themselves to save their honour from Babur's army. Babur captured Chanderi, earlier ruled by Rai, after his victory. The power vacuum left by Sanga was filled by Rao Maldeo Rathore, who took over the role of leading Rajput king and dominated the era with his increased use of cavalry.

== In popular culture ==
- 1988–1989: Bharat Ek Khoj, broadcast on Doordarshan, where he was played by Ravi Jhankal.
- 2013–2015: Bharat Ka Veer Putra – Maharana Pratap, broadcast by Sony Entertainment Television (India), where he was played by Aarav Chowdhary.

== See also ==
- Bappa Rawal
- Maharana Hammir Singh
- Maharana Kumbha
- Maharana Pratap
- Maharana Amar Singh
- Maharana Raj Singh
- History of Rajasthan
- Kingdom of Mewar
- List of battles in Rajasthan

== Bibliography ==
- Chandra, Satish (2005). Medieval India: From Sultanat to the Mughals Part - II. Har-Anand Publications. ISBN 978-81-241-1066-9.
- Chaube, J. (1975). History of Gujarat Kingdom, 1458-1537. Munshiram Manoharlal Publishers. ISBN 9780883865736.
- Chaurasia, Radhey Shyam (2002). History of Medieval India: From 1000 A.D. to 1707 A.D. Atlantic Publishers & Dist. ISBN 978-81-269-0123-4.
- Hooja, Rima (2006). A History of Rajasthan. Rupa & Company. ISBN 978-81-291-0890-6.
- Puri, Baij Nath (2003). A Comprehensive History of India: Comprehensive history of medieval India. Sterling Publishers Pvt. Ltd. ISBN 978-81-207-2508-9.
- Sarkar, Jadunath (1960). Military History of India. Orient Longmans. ISBN 978-0-86125-155-1.
- Sharma, Gopinath (1954). Mewar & the Mughal Emperors (1526-1707 A.D.). S.L. Agarwala.
- Sharma, Dasharatha (1970). Lectures on Rajput History and Culture. Motilal Banarsidass. ISBN 978-0-8426-0262-4.
- Somani, Rāmavallabha (1976). History of Mewar, from Earliest Times to 1751 A.D. Mateshwari Publications.
- Spear, Percival (1990). A History of India. Penguin Books India. ISBN 978-0-14-0138368-.
- Wink, Andre (2012). Akbar. Simon and Schuster. ISBN 978-1-78074-209-0.
- Chandra, Satish. History of Medieval India (800-1700). Orient BlackSwan. ISBN 9789390122547.
