= Delhi–Mewar conflicts =

Conflict between Kingdom of Mewar and Delhi Sultanate

Mewar–Delhi conflicts
Date	1321–1521
Location	North India
Result	Rajputs Mewar victory

Belligerents
Kingdom of Mewar	Delhi Sultanate

Commanders and leaders
Maharana Hammir; Baruji Sauda; Junsi Kachhwaha; Kshetra Singh; Lakha Singh; Mokal Singh; Rana Sanga (WIA); Medini Rai	Ghiyath al-Din Tughluq; Maldev Songara; Jaiza Songara; Muhammad bin Tughluq; Firuz Shah Tughluq; Mubarak Shah II; Ibrahim Lodi

The Delhi–Mewar conflicts were prolonged confrontations and periodic military engagements between the Kingdom of Mewar ruled by the Sisodiyas and the Delhi Sultanate. The conflict erupted when the Sisodiya dynasty took the region of Mewar from Delhi Sultanate's rule. The struggle which lasted nearly two centuries was fought in what is today the Indian states of Rajasthan, Madhya Pradesh and Uttar Pradesh.

The conflict started in the reign of Rana Hammir against the Tuqhlaq dynasty at the Battle of Singoli. This conflict was further carried out by Rana Kshetra and his successor Rana Lakha with the Sayyid dynasty in conquests for Bakrol and Badnor. An invasion by the latter was also successfully repelled at Raipur. The conflict took a short break when Rana Kumbha ascended the throne of Mewar as he was occupied throughout his life with the Islamic Sultanates of Malwa and Gujarat. The conflict resumed again with the Lodi dynasty when the latter tried to counter the growing hegemony of Mewar at the Battle of Khatoli and at Battle of Dholpur

== Prelude ==
In the year 1303, Sultan Allauddin Khilji of the Delhi Sultanate put an end to the Guhila Dynasty of Mewar when he besieged and occupied Chittorgarh, the capital of Mewar. Allauddin appointed his son Khizr Khan as the governor of the place. Khizr Khan remained there for a period of ten years after which he was forced to move to Ajmer and Maldev Songara, belonging to the Songara Chahuhan Dynasty was given the vassalage of Mewar. At the same time another branch of Guhilas known as Sisodias started to take the keypoints of Mewar under their new leader Maharana Hammir. He in coming years was able to take Mewar and the capital Chittorgarh by expelling Maldev. Meanwhile, Jaiza(Son of Maldev) fled to the Delhi court for help, starting the series of military standoffs which would continue for the next two centuries.

== Conflict ==
Maldev's son Jaiza had fled to the court of Muhammed Bin Tuqhlaq for help which he received when a large Muslim army led by a general of Delhi Sultanate attacked Mewar and both sides clashed at the Battle of Singoli where the Delhi Sultanate's forces were defeated and compelled to retreat. Hammir with this battle secured the independence of the Rajputana region. After Hammir his son Maharana Kshetra captured the district of Bakrol from the forces of Delhi Sultanate. Maharana Lakha the next Rana of Mewar was engaged in military standoffs against the Sayyiad Dynasty of Delhi in which the district of Badnor was captured. In the reign of Maharana Mokal was repulsed at Raipur. The conflict from thereafter took a break as Maharana Kumbha next Maharana of Mewar was busy all his life in affairs with Malwa Sultanate and Gujarat Sultanate. Hence no major military standoff was fought between this period. After the assassination of Maharana Kumbha his son Raimal ascended the throne by putting the assassin Uda to death. He too was not able to fight any major battles against the Delhi Sultanate because he had to restore strength and peace in Mewar which was lost after the assassination of Kumbha The conflict resumed again and took its peak when Rana Sanga became the Rana of Mewar and by enjoying the strong position of Mewar in the North-Western India started the policy of expansion. Sanga captured some parts of the Northeastern Rajputana which at that time were vassals of Delhi Sultanate. Meanwhile the new Sultan of Delhi Ibrahim Lodi attacked Rana Sanga in the battle of Khatoli which resulted in the defeat of the Sultan. To counter his past defeat he soon raised another force and attacked the Kingdom of Mewar at the Battle of Dholpur only to be humbled again. The victory at the battle of Dholpur made Mewar the master of all the land from Bayana to Chanderi which was conquered by Sultan Sikandar against the Malwa Sultanate. In bid to annex Ajmer and Ranthambore Ibraihm was further defeated by Rana Sanga when the former attacked Ranthambore

== Aftermath ==
The successful war under the various Maharanas of Mewar paved the way for Kingdom of Mewar to become one of the greatest powers in Northern India. Chanderi was given to Medini Rai as a gift.

== List of Battles ==
Name of Conflict(time)	Maharana/ Commander	Sultan/Commander	Outcome
Recovery of Mewar (1321–36)	Maharana Hammir: Baruji Sauda	Maladeva & Jaiza (first under Ghiyath al-Din Tughluq and later Muhammad bin Tughluq)	Mewar Victory: Amid the turmoil caused by the end of the Khalji dynasty in Delhi, Hammir Singh regained control of whole of Mewar including Chittorgarh.; He evicted Maladeva's son Jaiza, the Chauhan vassal of the Delhi Sultanate, from Mewar and established the Sisodiya dynasty in Mewar.
Battle of Singoli (1336)	Maharana Hammir: Junsi Kachhwaha	Muhammad bin Tughluq	Mewar Victory: Hammir Singh gained a decisive victory and freed all of Rajputana from the Sultanate's rule.
Battle of Bakrol	Maharana Kshetra	Firuz Shah Tughlaq	Mewar Victory: Kshetra Singh obtained a victory over the Delhi forces, who was badly defeated at Bakrole.
Battle of Badnor	Maharana Lakha	Firuz Shah Tughlaq	Mewar Victory: Rana Lakha like his father defeated the royal army of Delhi's Sultan Firuz Shah Tughluq.; He further took the war to Gaya in Bihar and was exempted from the pilgrimage tax imposed on Hindus for their visit there.
Battle of Raipur	Maharana Mokal	Mubarak Shah	Mewar Victory: Maharana Mokal repelled an invasion by Sayyid dynasty.
Battle of Khatoli (1517)	Maharana Sanga (WIA): Medini Ra	Ibrahim Khan Lodi	Mewar Victory: Rana Sanga defeated Ibrahim Lodi and annexed northeast Rajputana.; Ibrahim after being defeated fled from the battle leaving one of his sons behind to be taken as a prisoner.; The resources of Ibrahim were depleted by this war with Sanga so he could not renew the contest for some time.
Battle of Dholpur (1519)	Maharana Sanga: Medini Rai	Ibrahim Khan Lodi	Mewar Victory: In the battle, which was fought near Dholpur, the Mewar army made a successful charge, and defeated the opposing armies despite being numerically inferior.; The boundaries of Rana Sanga's military influence came to extend within striking distance of Agra. Chanderi bestowed to Medini Rai.
Battle of Ranthambhore (1521)	Maharana Sanga	Ibrahim Khan Lodi	Mewar Victory: According to a 16th-century text "Parshvanath-Shravan-Sattavisi", Rana Sanga further defeated Ibrahim Lodi at Ranthambore after the Siege of Mandsaur.
