= Hansa Bai =

- Rajkumari of Mandore; Rani of Mewar
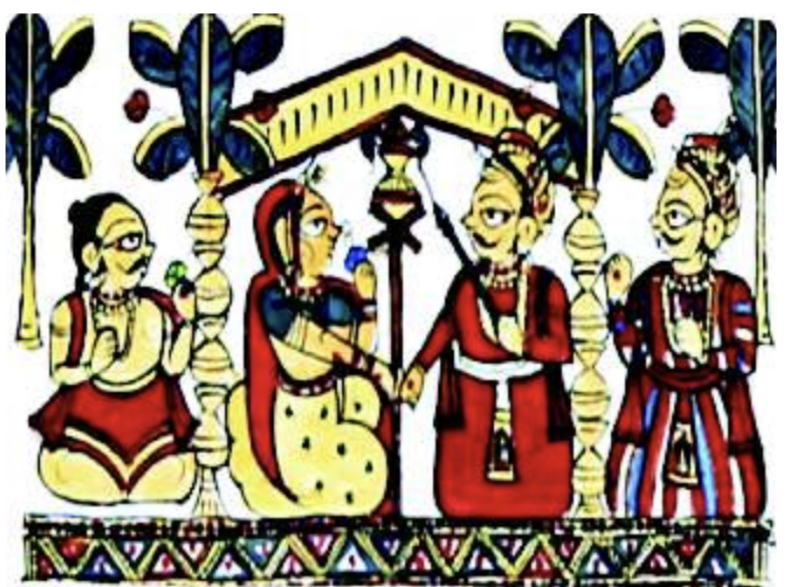
- Born: Estimated between 1383 and 1409; Mandore
- Died: After 1421
- Spouse: Lakha Singh
- Issue: Mokal Singh
- Father: Rao Chunda
- Mother: Suram De Sankhali
- Religion: Hinduism

Hansa Bai was a Rani of the Rajput kingdom of Mewar, in northwestern India, during the early 15th century. She was the wife of Maharana Lakha Singh and mother to his heir, Mokal.

Born as a Rathore princess of Mandore, she brought peace between her clan and that of her husband, the Sisodias, which lasted until the reign of her grandson, Rana Kumbha. She advised her son during the beginning of his reign, questioned the intentions of Mewari nobles, and is also believed to have educated Rana Kumbha.

== Early life and marriage ==
Hansa Bai, born Hansa Kumari, was the daughter of Chunda Rathore of Mandore and Rani Suram Sankhali. As a daughter of the king, she lived in the palace's harem (Rani Mahal) with her mother. Hansa learned how a woman could rule effectively by watching her stepmother, Sona Mohil. Sona influenced Hansa's father to appoint Sona's son, Kanha, as his successor, instead of his son, Ranmal. In response, Ranmal left Mandore in self-imposed exile.

She was first betrothed to the elder son of Maharana Lakha Singh of Mewar, Prince Chunda Sisodia. However, when the delegation from Mandore had arrived in Chittor to officialize the betrothal, Chunda was away from court. Lakha waited with the delegation until the prince returned. The aging leader of Chittor said the proposal was not meant for a "greybeard" like him and turned them down jokingly. When Prince Chunda later learned of the comment, the prince refused the marriage, for he could not accept a proposal which his father had publicly declined, however offhanded. The Maharana failed to change his son's mind, and, rather than offend Hansa's powerful family, was forced to marry the princess himself. In return, Chunda gave up his right to inheritance to the eldest son born by Hansa Bai.

== After marriage ==
=== As Rani of Mewar ===
Hansa Bai married Lakha Singh around either 1408 or 1407 and later gave birth to her son Mokal in 1409. She taught him as he grew and introduced him to his father's building plans, which would have a huge impact on him later in life. She also taught him of his lineage, his kingdom, and the Sisodia Hindu traditions, such as the God Eklinji, the many honor traditions such as robes of honor (which her brother used to kill another of Lakha's sons Raghedev) and the many other traditions such as Jahar, Saka and how to perform puja. In this way, she prepared him to be king.

=== As Queen Mother ===
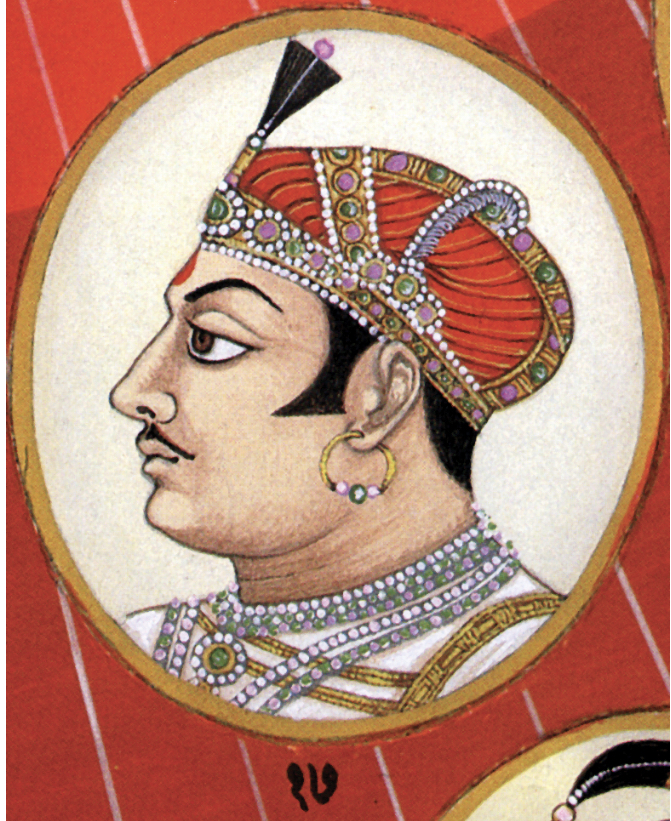
Mokal

In 1421 Lakha Singh, Hansa's husband died in the war, leaving young Mokal as his successor. Being a minor, Hansa's former betrothed Chunda began to look after the state of affairs, as promised to Rana Lakha. But Hansa Bai disapproved of the influence that Chunda had over the nobles of Mewar. She questioned his integrity and doubted his intentions. Her resentment made Chunda leave Chittor and retire to Mandu, capital of Malwa. Rani Hansa Bai obtained help from her brother Ranmal to administer the state of affairs on behalf of Mokal until he became older. He fulfilled this role admirably over the following years, launching military campaigns against Mewar's rivals. These include Firuz Khan of Nagaur, Ahmad Shah I of Gujarat and the Hadas of Bundi. However, there was resentment among the nobles of Mewar at the growing Rathore influence at court, in particular regarding the level of nepotism with which Ranmal awarded high positions. During this time Hansa also arranged Mokal's marriage to Sobhagya Devi. Though the couple was young, they conceived quickly and had Prince Kumbha.

Maharana Mokal had a brief stint as the ruler of Mewar but rose to fame as the most celebrated warrior of his race. He defeated Nagpur, Gujarat, and repelled an invasion by the Delhi Sultanate (Sayyid dynasty). But most importantly, he completed palaces that were commenced by his father, Maharana Lakha, and conspired to build more aesthetic structures. During this time, Hansa's father Chunda was killed in battle in 1423 and was succeeded, as the latter had planned, by his younger son Kanha. However, in 1428, Kanha too died and was followed by another son of Chunda, who also had a short reign. Seeing an opportunity, Ranmal marched on the capital city, Mandore, at the head of a Mewari army and seized the throne, becoming the new Rao of Marwar. As a Rao, his influence grew and the more power he had the more people resented him, such as Lakha's other son Raghedev. With more power, Ranmal began capturing land and while capturing land he made reforms, like introducing systems of weights and measures which Hansa and the other Mewar nobles agreed with.

=== As Queen Grandmother ===
In 1433, Mokal was assassinated by his paternal uncles, Chacha and Mera, which brought an end to the great Maharana in the making at the young age of 24. Lack of support, however, caused Chacha and Mera to flee thus once more leaving a small child as ruler of Mewar, now in the person of Mokal's son Kumbha. Hansa Bai, now the queen-grandmother again called on her brother Ranmal to take charge of the state and become regent until the new Rana reached an older age. Ranmal accompanied by some of his twenty-four sons, returned to Chittor, nominally taking up the position of caretaker to his minor great-nephew though, for all intents and purposes, he became the true power in the kingdom.

The new regent's first action was to strike the allies of Mewar's rival kingdoms of Gujarat and Malwa, the latter of which having sheltered Mokal's killers. The rulers of Bundi, Abu, Bhoola and Basantgarh were crushed and the Sultan of Malwa, Mahmud Khalji, was defeated in the Battle of Sarangpur in 1437. He and Hansa also began to hunt down the conspirators, with some being killed and others being forced into hiding. One of them, Mokal's paternal uncle Chacha, had his daughter Bharmali taken captive and married by Ranmal. 500 other girls belonging to the families of the fugitives were captured and given out by Ranmal to his favorites.

One of Mokal's brothers, Raghavdev, objected to this action and took the women into his protection. He began to grow apprehensive of the growing Rathore influence in the court and started preparing a resistance to Ranmal. Conversely, Ranmal also viewed the Mewari prince as a threat and too launched a conspiracy. Events came to a head when Ranmal invited Raghadev to present him with a traditional robe of honor. However, unknown to the latter, the sleeves of the robe had been sown in such a way to restrict his movement. Raghadev was then ambushed by Ranmal's men, who immediately cut down the helpless prince. Hansa was outraged and did not support her brother killing Raghavdev and the captivity of the women. Hansa's disapproval has been cited as a factor which influenced the young Kumbha to kill Ranmal while he was drunk and tied to his bed. During this time Ranmal's son Jodha escaped from Mewar and there is a strong possibility that Hansa aided in the escape, not wanting her homeland of Mandore to be without a king. As King Kumbha regularly prayed to the god Eklingji, it is suggested that he was likely taught by Hansa to do so.

=== Death ===
The accurate date of Hansa's death is unknown and it is possible that she wasn't alive to see the assassination of her brother and died shortly after the reign of her grandson began, explaining why the nobles waited to assassinate Ranmal, not wanting to displease the Queen Grandmother. According to Mewari reports however Hansa Bai, lived well past the assassination of her brother as she arranged for peace between her grandson Kumbha and nephew Jodha through the marriage of Rao Jodha's daughter Shringar Deiji to Rana Kumbha's son Raimal. Her descendants were Kings of Mewar and the breaking down of the alliance between the Rathores and Sisodias was catalyzed through her death, resuming feuds between the clans for decades.
