= Jilola =

Village in Rajasthan, India

Coordinates: 25°17′N 74°01′E

Jilola is a small village in the Mewar region of the State of Rajasthan in India.

Jilola is located near Amet on the Bhilwara road. It is the home of the Chundawat clan. There is a small fort in the centre of Jilola near the Mana bagh. An old kachori {judicial court} is located near the fort.

The name "Jilola" is derived from Jheel (lake) and sola (sixteen). There are salt pans that allow people to make salt from the water of numerous small ponds. Jilola has several lakes: Jaliyo or Butao ka talab, agra or Purshoottam sagar and Naya Talab or Laxman sagar.

Govardhan Puja is the biggest festival in Jilola, celebrated one day after Diwali.

Shri Purshottam singhji is the Thakur saheb of jilola Thikana.
