= Alhaji Barhath =

14th-century poet & horse trader

- Born: Haduwa
- Occupations: Warrior; Poet; Trader
- Years active: 14-15th century
- Notable work: Veermayan
- Children: 2 (Dulhaji, Jethaji)
- Father: Bhanoji Barhath

Alhaji Barhath (14-15th century), or Alhaji Rohadia, was a Rajasthani poet, warrior & horse trader known for providing shelter to Rao Chunda of Mandore during his childhood, who is credited with laying the foundation of the Rathore rule in Marwar.

== Early life ==
Alhaji Barhath was born in a prosperous family in Haduwa village of Jaisalmer to Bhanoji Barhath. He was a skilled poet but also traded in horse and cattle. He is said to have owned more than 500 cows. There were ten households of his servants, who lived alongside and looked after Alhaji's cattle. In his youth, he left his native place of Haduwa and settled in a village called 'Kalau', about twenty miles south of Pokaran.

== Sheltering Chunda ==
Alhaji lived in his village called Kalau located in Jodhpur, Rajasthan. Viramdev Rathore, the ruler of Mahewa and father of Chunda, was killed in battle against Johiyas around 1383 AD. At this time, Chunda was a mere child. Chunda's mother, referred to as Mangaliyaniji, was apprehensive about Chunda's safety & preferred to seek safety for him. She approached Alhaji Barhath of Kalau and handed Chunda over to him.

After ensuring the safety of Chunda under Alhaji, Mangaliyaniji is said to have committed Sati.

Alhaji raised Chunda in anonymity for 14 years, hiding his real identity. Growing up, Chunda used to herd the cattle of Alhaji.

== Presenting Chunda to Rawal Mallinath ==
One day, Chunda grew tired while herding the cattle and slept under a tree. When Alhaji arrived to check on Chunda, he saw a serpent shading over Chunda's head, while he lay sleeping. Alhaji took this as a sign of Chunda's destiny as a ruler & began training him.

Later, at the opportune time, Alhaji equipped Chunda with a horse and weapons and travelled to Mahewa & presented him before Rawal Mallinath, revealing Chunda's identity as his nephew. Mallinath granted Chunda a distant thana of Salodi.

Chunda showed his skill as a warrior and began expanding his territory. In 1395, Mandore was given as dowry to Rao Chunda by the Inda Rajputs and eventually became the capital of the Rathores. Alhaji was instrumental in this alliance as he convinced Raidhaval Inda to marry his daughter to Chunda. Rao Chunda inherited the Rathore mantle and was instrumental in the move of the Rathores from the marginal Mahewa belt to Mandore.

== Reunion ==
Years after Chunda was installed on the throne of Mandor, Alhaji remembered Chunda and wished to see him. He travelled to Mandore to meet Chunda where he stayed in the court but didn't feel the need to introduce himself. As Chunda didn't recognize him initially among the host of courtiers, one day, Alhaji is said to have spoken this couplet:

Dingal

_____________________________

चूंडा ना आवै चीत, काचर कालाऊ तणा।

भूप भयौ भैभींत, मंडोवर रै मालियै ॥

English translation
O Chunda, don't you remember the Kachars of Kalau village?

That is, how could you forget your days of adversity? Living in the palaces of Mandovar and after becoming such a famous prince, you should not have forgotten your condition during the days of adversity.

Hearing this, Chunda became aware of Alhaji and rose up to greet him. As a sign of gratitude, Chunda offered half of his kingdom to Alhaji, which he refused. After a lot of insistence, Alhaji accepted only twelve kos long and twelve kos wide land enough for the pasture of his cows and horses.

== Legacy ==
Today, three villages named Bhondu, Sihanda and Chak-Dair are inhabited in the same land by the descendants of Alhaji. Chunda also granted other villages in his jagir. Alhaji had two sons - the elder son's name was Dulhaji and the younger one's name was Jethaji. Dulhaji, in turn, had a daughter called Malhan Devi, who is worshipped as an incarnation of Shakti.

== Authorship ==
Alhaji had composed the work 'Veermayan', a fragmentary copy of which was discovered at Shubhkaran Kaviya of Jodhpur. This work has verses ranging from 90 to 160. It recounts the story of Viramdev, father of Chunda, who ultimately dies in a battle with Johiyas. It is distinct from 'Veervan' (1960 AD) published by Rajasthan Prachya Vidya Pratishthan, Jodhpur and edited by Lakshmi Kumari Chundawat. According to Udairaj Ujjwal, three original copies of this work remained with the descendants of Alhaji.
