= Ranmal =

Rao of Marwar from 1428 to 1438

- Rao
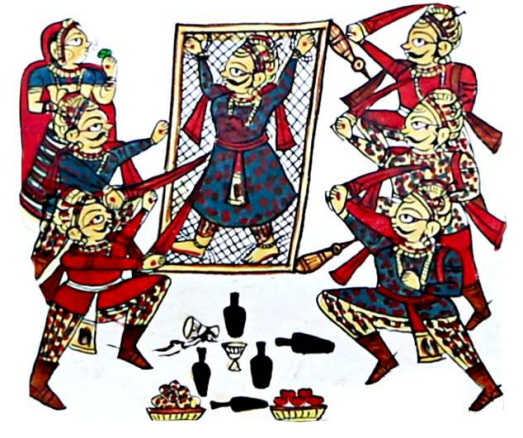
- Ridmal depicted in the centre being assassinated

Rao of Marwar
- Reign: 1428 – 27 October 1438
- Predecessor: Kanha
- Successor: Jodha
- Born: 1392
- Died: 27 October 1438 (aged 45–46); Chittor Fort, Mewar (in present-day Chittorgarh, Rajasthan, India)
- Issue: Jodha; Kandhal; Several others
- Dynasty: Rathore
- Father: Chunda
- Mother: Suram De Sankhali

Rao Ranmal (1392 – 27 October 1438), also called Ran Mal or Ridmal, was the Rathore ruler of Marwar from 1428 to 1438. A notable expansionist and skilled warrior, Ranmal is also noteworthy for having twice served as regent of the kingdom of Mewar under two different kings.

After having been displaced as heir to Marwar in favour of a younger brother, Ranmal had joined the court of his brother-in-law, Rana Lakha Singh of Mewar. There, he amassed significant influence, eventually becoming regent to his minor nephew Mokal Singh following the death of Lakha in 1421. In 1428, Ranmal returned to Marwar to claim his ancestral throne, left vacant by the deaths of his father and brothers. When Mokal Singh was assassinated five years later, Ranmal once again took on the governance of Mewar, now in the name of Mokal's young son Kumbha.

During both his regencies of Mewar, as well as his rule of his own kingdom, Ranmal had launched numerous successful military campaigns against neighbouring states, which included the kingdoms of Gujarat, Bundi, and Malwa. However, he was greatly resented by the nobles of Mewar due to the considerable Rathore influence he brought to the Sisodia kingdom. When a Mewari prince was murdered on his orders, a coup was launched against him in 1438, culminating in his assassination and the invasion of Marwar. The latter was left weakened in the aftermath and it took his successor Jodha many years to restore it to its former prominence.

== Background ==
Ranmal was born in 1392 as the only son of Rao Chunda, the Rathore ruler of Marwar, by his wife Suram De Sankhali, daughter of Bisal. By right of primogeniture, as the eldest son of his father, Ranmal was initially heir-apparent to the throne. However, under the influence of his favourite wife Sona Mohil, Chunda was persuaded to instead appoint her son Kanha as his successor. In response Ranmal, now disinherited, left Mandore and embarked on a self-imposed exile.

== Exile in Mewar ==
Ranmal travelled to Chittor, the fortress-capital of the kingdom of Mewar. There, he was welcomed and given a place at court by the ruler of the state, Rana Lakha Singh, who was the husband of Ranmal's sister Hansa Bai. The prince rapidly gained influence at the Mewari court, with his power reaching its zenith following the death of Lakha Singh in 1421.

Hansa Bai, due to the minority of her young son Mokal Singh, entreated Ranmal to administer the state on behalf of the new Rana. He fulfilled this role admirably over the following years, launching military campaigns against Mewar's rivals. These include Firuz Khan of Nagaur, Ahmad Shah I of Gujarat and the Hadas of Bundi. However, there was resentment among the nobles at the growing Rathore influence at court, in particular regarding the level of nepotism with which Ranmal awarded high positions. This ill-feeling even extended against the young Rana himself, eventually becoming a factor in his assassination over a decade later.

== Ruler of Janglu ==
After securing a position in the Mewar court of Sisodiyas, Ranmal subsequently returned to Janglu of which he became ruler. Further, he carried out incursions into Bhati territory and occupied Bikampur.

== Reign ==
Ranmal's father Chunda was killed in battle in 1423 and was succeeded, as the latter had planned, by his younger son Kanha. However, in 1428, Kanha too died and was followed by another of Chunda's sons, who also had a short reign. Seeing an opportunity, Ranmal marched on the capital city, Mandore, at the head of a Mewari army and seized the throne, becoming the new Rao of Marwar.

A skilled warrior, Ranmal began expanding Rathore territory. He is recorded as conquering the city of Bikrampur after killing a certain Bhati chief named Kelana, possibly referring to Rao Kelana of Pugal, who was among those responsible for killing his father. Further to this, he defeated Hasan Khan, the Pathan ruler of Jalore, and also occupied Nagaur, with the towns of Nadol, Jaitaran and Sojat too being brought under his control. He also introduced some reforms, both in Marwar and earlier in Mewar, including the improvement of the existing systems of weights and measures.

=== Regent of Mewar ===
In 1433, Rana Mokal Singh was assassinated in a conspiracy, thus once more leaving a small child as ruler of Mewar, now in the person of Mokal's son Kumbha. Hansa Bai, now the queen-grandmother, again called on her brother Ranmal to take charge of the state until the new Rana reached the age of majority. Ranmal, accompanied by some of his twenty-four sons, returned to Chittor, nominally taking up the position of caretaker to his minor great-nephew, though for all intents and purposes, he became the true power in the kingdom.

The new regent's first action was to strike the allies of Mewar's rival kingdoms of Gujarat and Malwa, the latter of which having sheltered Mokal's killers. The rulers of Bundi, Abu, Bhoola and Basantgarh were crushed and the Sultan of Malwa, Mahmud Khalji, was defeated in the Battle of Sarangpur in 1437. He also began to hunt down the conspirators, with some being killed and others being forced into hiding. One of them, Mokal's paternal uncle Chacha, had his daughter Bharmali taken captive and married by Ranmal. 500 other girls belonging to the families of the fugitives were captured and given out by Ranmal to his favourites.

One of Mokal's brothers, Raghavdev, objected to this action and took the women into his protection. He began to grow apprehensive of the growing Rathore influence in the court and started preparing a resistance to Ranmal. Conversely, Ranmal also viewed the Mewari prince as a threat and too launched a conspiracy. Events came to a head when Ranmal invited Raghadev to present him with a traditional robe of honour. However, unknown to the latter, the sleeves of the robe had been sown in such a way so as to restrict his movement. Raghadev was then ambushed by Ranmal's men, who immediately cut down the incapacitated prince.

== Assassination ==
The murder of Raghadev had a profound impact on public opinion of Ranmal, with both nobles and the general population already being resentful of his domination at court. Many grew fearful for the life of the young Rana, prompting chiefs to begin curtailing the regent. Prince Chunda, eldest son and at one-time heir to the late Rana Lakha Singh, was called back to the city to avenge his brother's death. While Chunda re-entered Mewar and removed Rathore outposts outside Chittor fortress, nobles conspired against Ranmal from within. They enlisted the help of Chacha's daughter Bharmali, who was one of the wives of Ranmal. On the night of Diwali, 1438, she plied him with alcohol until he fell into a drunken stupor and tied him to his bed with his own turban. Ranmal was then set upon by assassins sent by the Mewari nobles. In spite of his bonds, he was able to stand upright, but unable to defend himself, he was ultimately killed.

The death of Ranmal caused a significant falling out between the kingdoms of Marwar and Mewar, resulting in the former's capital, Mandore, and its surrounding lands being occupied by Mewar's army. It took Ranmal's son and successor Jodha (who had barely escaped from Chittor alive himself) several years to reestablish Marwar's former eminence and territory.

== Family ==
Ranmal married multiple times, as was common among the Rajput elite. His wives were:

- Kodamde Bhatiyani, daughter of Ranigde, Rao of Pugal
- Bharmali, daughter of Chacha, son of Kshetra Singh, Rana of Mewar
- Rami Bai, daughter of Lalaji Songira of Nadol
- Hansamati Parihar
- Tribhuvan De
- Sarangde
- Nabhal Deval De

He had several sons, many of whom subsequently became ancestors of new Rathore clans. They were:

- Jodha – Ranmal's successor as Rao of Marwar. He founded Jodhpur and laid foundations of Mehrangarh. His descendants are called Jodha Rathores.
- Akhairaj – He received Bagri village and was the ancestor of Akhirajot Rathores, the Kumpawats and Jaitawats.
- Kandhal – He left Jodhpur with Rao Bika for Bikaner and is the ancestor of the Kandhalot sakh of Bikaner, Rawtots and Baneerots.
- Champa – He received Kaparro and Banar village and is the ancestor of the Champawat Rathores.
- Lakha – He left Jodhpur with Rao Bika for Bikaner and is ancestor of the Lakhavat sakh of Bikaner.
- Bhakhar – He died before Jodhpur was established. Though his son Bala, he is ancestor of the Balavat Rathores.
- Dungarsi – He received the village of Bhadrajan and is the ancestor of the Dungrot of Bhadrajan.
- Jaitmal – ancestor of the Bhojrajots of Palasani through his son Bhojraj.
- Mandala – ancestor of the Mandalot Sakh of Bikaner and Marwar Rathores and the Madlawats of Saroonda and Bhanwarani.
- Pata – Received the village of Karnu and is the ancestor of the Patawats.
- Rupa – Received Chadi Village and is ancestor of the Rupwats of Bheloo and Chakhoo.
- Karna – Received Lunavas village and is the ancestor of the Karnots, the clan of Durga Das Rathore.
- Sanda – ancestor of the Sandawats.
- Mandan – ancestor of the Mandanots of Alay.
- Natha – He left Jodhpur with Rao Bika for Bikaner and is the ancestor of the Nathotas of Jhajhu-Nathoosar.
- Uda – He left Jodhpur with Rao Bika for Bikaner and is the ancestor of the Udawats of Udasar in Bikaner .
- Bera – ancestor of the Bairawats of Dodhot.
- Jagmal – He died before Jodhpur was established and is the ancestor of the Khetsighots.
- Vaira – Received Dundhar village and is the ancestor of Vairvat Sakha of Marwar Rathores.
- Hapa – ancestor of Rinmalots and Hapavays.
- Adval – founder of Advalot Sakh of Marwar Rathores.
- Sando – founder of Sandavat Sakh of Marwar Rathores.
- Sindho – ancestor of Rinmalots.
- Tejsi – founder of Tejsiyot sakh of Marwar Rathores.
- Vanvir – founder of Vanvirot Sakh of Marwar Rathores.
