= Battle of Singoli =

1336 battle between Mewar kingdom and Delhi sultanate

- Part of List of Mewar (Sisodiya)–Delhi conflicts
Date	1336
Location	Singoli, India 24.9688624°N 75.2742861°E
Result	Mewar victory
Territorial changes	Mewar becomes independent from the Delhi Sultanate.

Belligerents
Kingdom of Mewar	Delhi Sultanate

Commanders and leaders
Hammir Singh	Disputed
- Location within South Asia Battle of Singoli (Rajasthan)

The Battle of Singoli was a military engagement on land, fought between the rebelling forces of Mewar, led by Hammir Singh, and the Delhite forces at Singoli, in present-day Madhya Pradesh, India.

Hammir Singh had gained control of Mewar by evicting Maldev's son Jaiza, the Chauhan vassal of the Delhi Sultanate. Jaiza fled to the Delhi court of Muhammad bin Tughluq, prompting Tughlaq himself to march towards Mewar with his strong army. In the ensuing battle, the Tughlaq army was defeated and Muhammad bin Tughlaq was taken prisoner. He was kept prisoner in Chittorgarh for three months and released after the Sultanate ceded Ajmer, Ranthambor, Nagaur and Sopor; and paid 50 lakhs rupees and 100 elephants as ransom to Hammir Singh. The above narrative is according to Rajput chronicles. According to Rima Hooja and Majumdar, the defeat and the imprisonment of the Sultan cannot be regarded as true without corroborative evidence. However the conflict where Sisodias defeated Delhi Sultanate at Singoli altogether cannot be regarded baseless, a 1438 Jain temple inscription attests that Rana Hammir Singh's forces defeated a Muslim army; this Sultanate army could have been led by some generals, and not Muhammad bin Tughlaq himself.

== Aftermath ==
Rana Hammir Singh took control of Ajmer, Ranthambore, Nagaur, and Sopor after this victory making whole of Rajputana independent of the Sultanate and his authority was recognized by other Rajput chiefs.
