= Pratiharas of Mandavyapura =

Indian dynasty (6th – 9th centuries)

Find spots of the Mandvayapura Pratihara inscriptions, with the dynasty's capitals

The Pratiharas of Mandavyapura, (Note: IAST: Pratīhāras of Māṇḍavyapura) also known as the Pratiharas of Mandore (or Mandor), were a dynasty that ruled parts of the present-day Rajasthan between 6th and 9th centuries. They first established their capital at Mandavyapura (modern Mandore), and later ruled from Medantaka (modern Merta).

== Origins ==
The origin of the dynasty is described in two inscriptions: the 837 CE Jodhpur inscription of Bauka and the 861 CE Ghantiyala (or Ghatiyala) inscription of Kakkuka. According to the two inscriptions, the family descended from the brother of Ramabhadra. This brother is identified as the legendary Kshatriya hero Lakshmana, the brother of Rama. He is said to have as a door-keeper ("pratihara") for Rama, because of which the family came to be known as Pratihara. The imperial Pratiharas also claimed descent from the legendary hero Lakshmana. The members of the two families also share identical names such as Bhoja, Kakkuka and Nagabhata. Based on these evidences, it appears that the two families were related, although the exact relationship between them is not known. It appears that the Pratiharas of Mandavyapura ultimately became feudatory of the imperial Pratiharas.

== History ==
The earliest known historical members of the family are Harichandra and his second wife Bhadra. In Pratihāra inscriptions, Harichandra is mentioned as a vipra (implying a Brahmana status) while Bhadra came from a Kshatriya noble family. They had four sons: Bhogabhatta, Kakka, Rajjila and Dadda. These four men captured Mandavyapura and erected a rampart there. It is not known where the family lived before the conquest of Mandavyapura.

A 625 CE inscription of a feudatory ruler named Rajilla has been found at Vasantgarh. This Rajilla and his father Vajrabhata Satyashraya were vassals of the Chapotkata ruler Varmalata. B. N. Puri identified this Rajilla as Harichandra's son Rajilla, although the names of their fathers are different according to epigraphic evidence. Puri argued that the members of the two families shared similar names such as Tata, Bapaka and Bauka, and names ending in -bhata (Vajrabhata and Nagabhata).

=== Nagabhata ===
Nagabhata, fourth in line from Harichandra, moved his capital from Mandavyapura to Medantaka (modern Merta). The original capital still retained its importance, as Nagabhata's successor Tata is said to have retired there.

=== Tata ===
Nagabhata and his queen Jajjika-devi had two sons: Tata and Bhoja. The Chinese Buddhist traveler Xuanzang described a kingdom named Kiu-che-lo and its capital Pi-lo-mi-lo. These two words have been identified as Chinese transcriptions of "Gurjara" and "Bhillamala" (Bhinmal). Historian R. C. Majumdar theorized that the king of Kiu-che-lo was the Mandavyapura Pratihara king Tata. But Baij Nath Puri was critical of this theory, because Xuanzang describes the king as Buddhist and his kingdom as the second largest in western India. The Mandavyapura Pratihara kingdom was a small one. Moreover, Xuanzang does not mention Mandavyapura or Medantaka. According to Puri, the ruler mentioned by Xuanzang was another king named Varmalata.

Tata retired to a hermitage in Mandavyapura after handing over the kingdom to his younger brother Bhoja. Next, Tata's son Yashovardhana ascended the throne, possibly after a disputed succession.

=== Shiluka ===
His descendant Shiluka is said to have "fixed a perpetual boundary" between the Stravani and Valla countries. He is also said to have "knocked down" the Bhattika Devaraja of Valla. This appears to be a reference to his victory over the neighbouring rulers. Stravani can be identified with a place in the modern Jaisalmer district, and has been mentioned as "Taban" by the Arab writers. R. C. Majumdar identified Bhattika Devaraja as the Pratihara king Devaraja, but B. N. Puri disagrees with this theory.

Shiluka also excavated a tank, established a new city and commissioned the Siddheshvara Mahadeva temple at a place called Treta. His son Jhota retired after appointing his son Bhiladitya as king, and proceeded to the Bhagirathi river.

=== Kakka ===
Bhiladitya retired after handing over the kingdom to his son Kakka. Kakka is said to have gained fame in the battle of Mudgagiri (modern Munger) against the ruler of Gauda. This probably refers to his participation in the campaign of his overlord Nagabhata II.

He was married to Rani Padmini of the Bhati clan, considered to be identical with the Bhatis of Jaisalmer.

According to the Jodhpur inscription, Kakka's son Bauka defeated and killed a king of the Mayura dynasty.

=== Kakkuka ===
Kakkuka, a step-brother of Bauka, was the son of Kakka and Durlabhadevi. According to a Ghantiyala inscription, he gained fame in the countries of Travani (Stravani), Valla, Mada, Arya, Gurjaratra, Lata and Parvata. This Another Ghantiyala inscription mentions that he established a market at a place called Rohiṃsakūpa, which had been deserted for the fear of the Abhiras.

Kakkuka is the last known ruler of the dynasty. The dynasty probably ended with him, and the kingdom became a part of the territories of the imperial Pratiharas of Kannauj. The Imperial Pratihara dynasty later broke into several small states after the Ghaznavid invasions. These branches fought each other for territory and one of the branches ruled Mandore till the 14th century.

This Pratihara branch had marital ties with Rao Chunda of the Rathore clan and gave Mandore in dowry to Chunda, resulting in the Pratiharas getting absorbed into what later became Jodhpur State. This was specifically done to form an alliance against the Turks of the Tughlaq dynasty.

== Rulers ==
Rudolf Hoernlé assumed a period of 20 years for each generation, and placed the dynasty's founder Harichandra in c. 640 CE. Baij Nath Puri placed Harichandra in c. 600 CE. R. C. Majumdar, on the other hand, assumed a period of 25 years for each generation, and placed him in c. 550 CE. The following is a list of the dynasty's rulers (IAST names in brackets) and estimates of their reigns, assuming a period of 25 years:

- Harichandra (Haricandra) alias Rohilladhi, r. c. 550 CE
- Rajilla, r. c. 575 CE
- Narabhatta (Narabhaṭa) alias Pellapelli, r. c. 600 CE
- Nagabhata (Nāgabhaṭa) alias Nahada, r. c. 625 CE
- Tata (Tāta) and Bhoja, r. c. 650 CE
- Yashovardhana (Yaśovardhana), r. c. 675 CE
- Chanduka (Canduka), r. c. 700 CE
- Shiluka (Śīluka) alias Silluka, r. c. 725 CE
- Jhota, r. c. 750 CE
- Bhilladitya alias Bhilluka, r. c. 775 CE
- Kakka, r. c. 800 CE
- Bauka (Bāuka), r. c. 825 CE
- Kakkuka, r. c. 861 CE

Bauka and Kakkuka were sons of Kakka from different mothers. The Jodhpur and Ghantiyala inscriptions of the two step-brothers give same genealogy of the family, except the last two names. Since these two inscriptions were found not far from each other, it appears that Bauka succeeded Kakka (rather than the two dividing Kakka's kingdom).
