= Raoji Ki Ger =

Festival celebrated in Mandore, Jodhpur

Raoji ki Ger
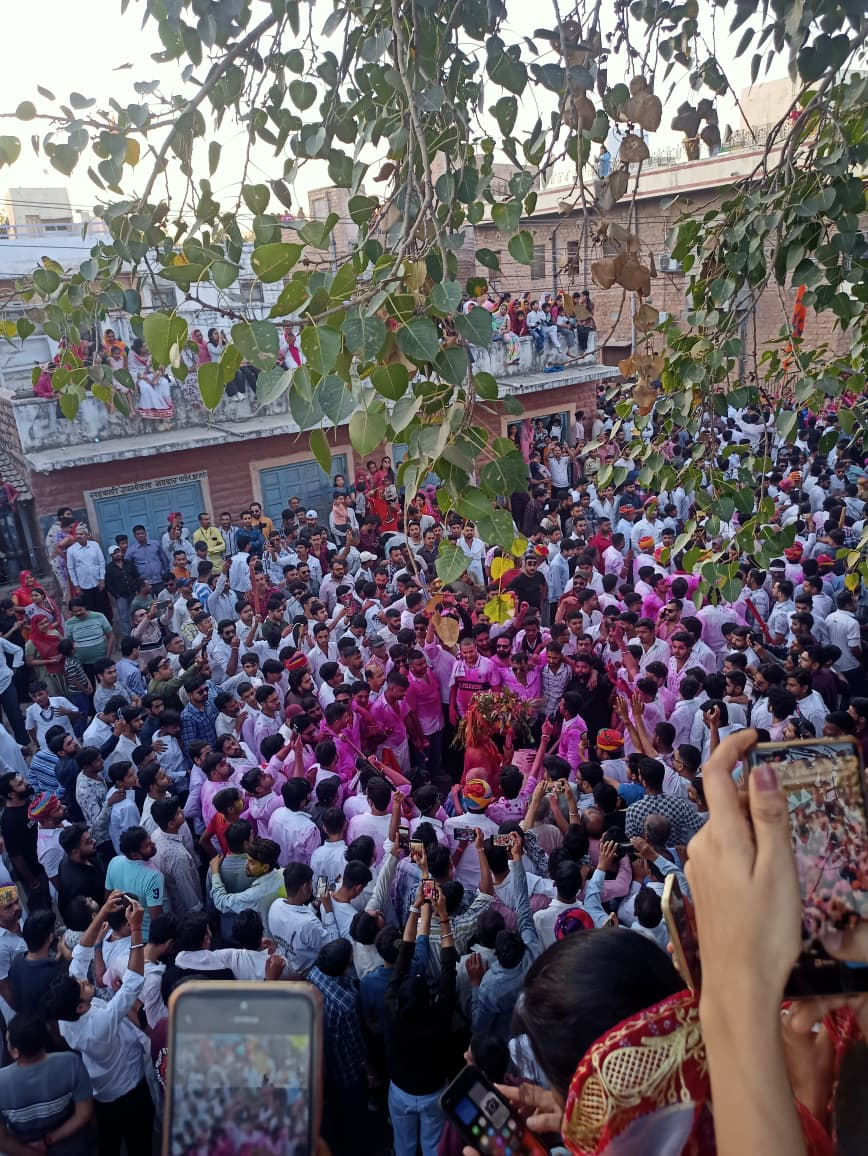
- Raoji ki Ger procession in Mandore, 2026.
- Date: Dhulandi (the day after Holi)
- Frequency: Annual
- Locations: Mandore, Jodhpur, Rajasthan, India
- Coordinates: 26.35292°N 73.03249°E
- Founded: 1392 CE (Commemorates victory of Rao Hema Gehlot)
- Participants: 8 local beras

Raoji ki Ger (also locally known as Raav or Rao Mahotsav) is an annual cultural festival and procession held on Dhulandi in the Mandore region of Jodhpur, Rajasthan. Organized primarily by the local Sainik Kshatriya community, the tradition has been observed for over 630 years. The event commemorates the 14th-century military victory of a local warrior, Rao Hema Gehlot, who defeated the forces of Aibak Khan to liberate Mandore.

The focal point of the festival is a newly married youth, selected to represent the Rao for a single day. Adorned with a crown of flowers and leaves to symbolize the camouflage used by historical soldiers, he leads a procession of men through various local neighborhoods.

Women are prohibited from participating in the procession due to the traditional singing of explicit folk songs by the participants. The festivities conclude when the Rao performs a ceremonial jump into the Nag Ganga (also known as Nag Kund) pond.

== History ==
The festival's origins are associated with the late 14th century liberation of Mandore from Turkish administration. According to local historical records and the inscription at his memorial in Mandore, Rao Hema Gehlot was born in the village of Kuchera in the Nagaur district. A formative incident in his youth involved his mother, Gavari, who protected a wounded hare that had sought refuge with her from a hunting party. Rao Hema's defense of his family's honor during this confrontation established a reputation for valor, leading the Inda Parihars—the local chieftains struggling under foreign occupation—to invite him to Mandore. He arrived in the region on 12 March 1389 (Vikram Samvat 1446).

During this period, the Delhi Sultanate's grip on the region was weakening under the late Tughlaq dynasty. Mandore was administered as an outpost by a Turkish official named Aibak Khan, an appointee of Zafar Khan, the Governor of Gujarat, under Gujarat Sultanate. This Aibak Khan is identified as a local administrator distinct from the 13th-century Sultan of Delhi, Qutb ud-Din Aibak. Traditional accounts state that Aibak Khan imposed heavy levies on the local population, culminating in a demand for 100 bullock carts filled with green fodder for his cavalry. Rao Hema Gehlot devised an ambush, concealing 500 armed soldiers within the fodder-filled carts while the drivers camouflaged themselves with green leaves. Upon gaining entry to the Mandore Fort, the hidden warriors defeated the garrison and reclaimed the stronghold.

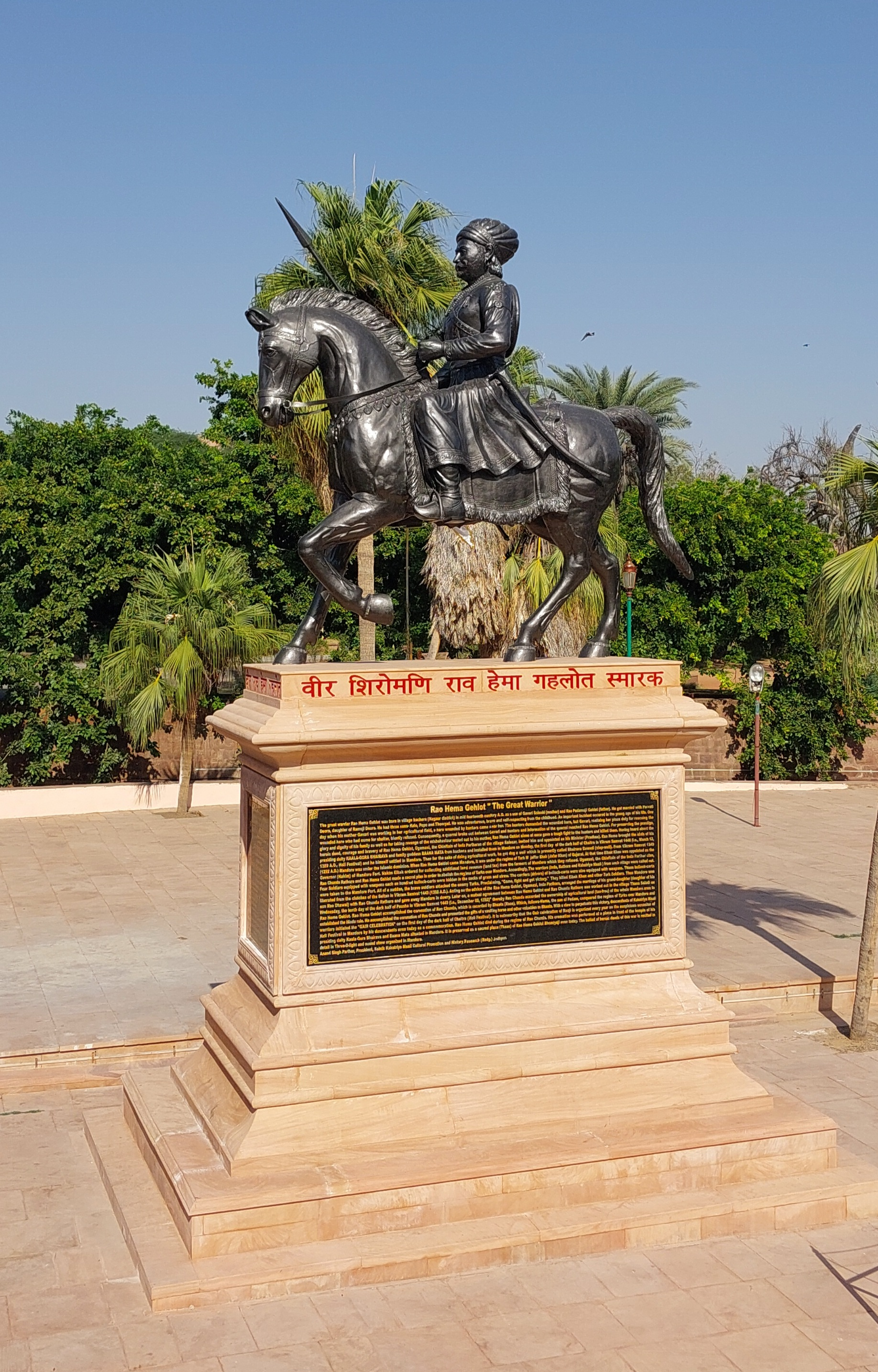
Statue of Rao Hema Gehlot in Mandore garden

Following the victory, control of Mandore was transferred to Rao Chunda, and in recognition of his service, Rao Hema Gehlot was granted an agricultural estate on 8 December 1392 (Vikram Samvat 1449). The annual Raoji ki Ger was established on the day of Dhulandi to commemorate this victory. Traditionally, the Rao wears floral crown as a direct homage to the camouflage used by the historical soldiers.

== Selection of the Rao ==
The festival procession is led by a newly married man selected from the Gehlot clan of the Khokriya Bera neighborhood. The candidate should possess a strong physique and demonstrate proficiency in traditional dance, particularly to the rhythmic beat of the Chang (drum). Historically, the authority to select the Rao belonged to the Gopi Bera and later the Phoolbagh Bera. It is currently exercised by elders of the Aamli Bera.

Once a candidate is chosen, the elders formalize the selection by stamping a pink or red handprint (chhapa) on the youth's back. Following this ritual, the youth is considered a “Rao” for the duration of the day. He is traditionally adorned in white garments, ankle bells (ghunghroo), and a crown composed of fresh flowers and leaves. This specific attire serves as a symbolic tribute to the camouflage used by Rao Hema Gehlot's soldiers during the 14th-century liberation of Mandore.

== The Procession (Ger) ==
The ceremonial procession, known as the Ger, typically commences in the late afternoon from the Shiva temple in the Mandawata Bera. The route spans approximately 3 kilometers and passes through several historic neighborhoods, including the Khokriya, Bhiyali, Gopi, and Phoolbagh beras. Participation involves thousands of men from eight distinct local beras (clans or neighborhoods), who march while singing traditional folk songs and dancing. The primary instrument played during the march is the Chang drum.

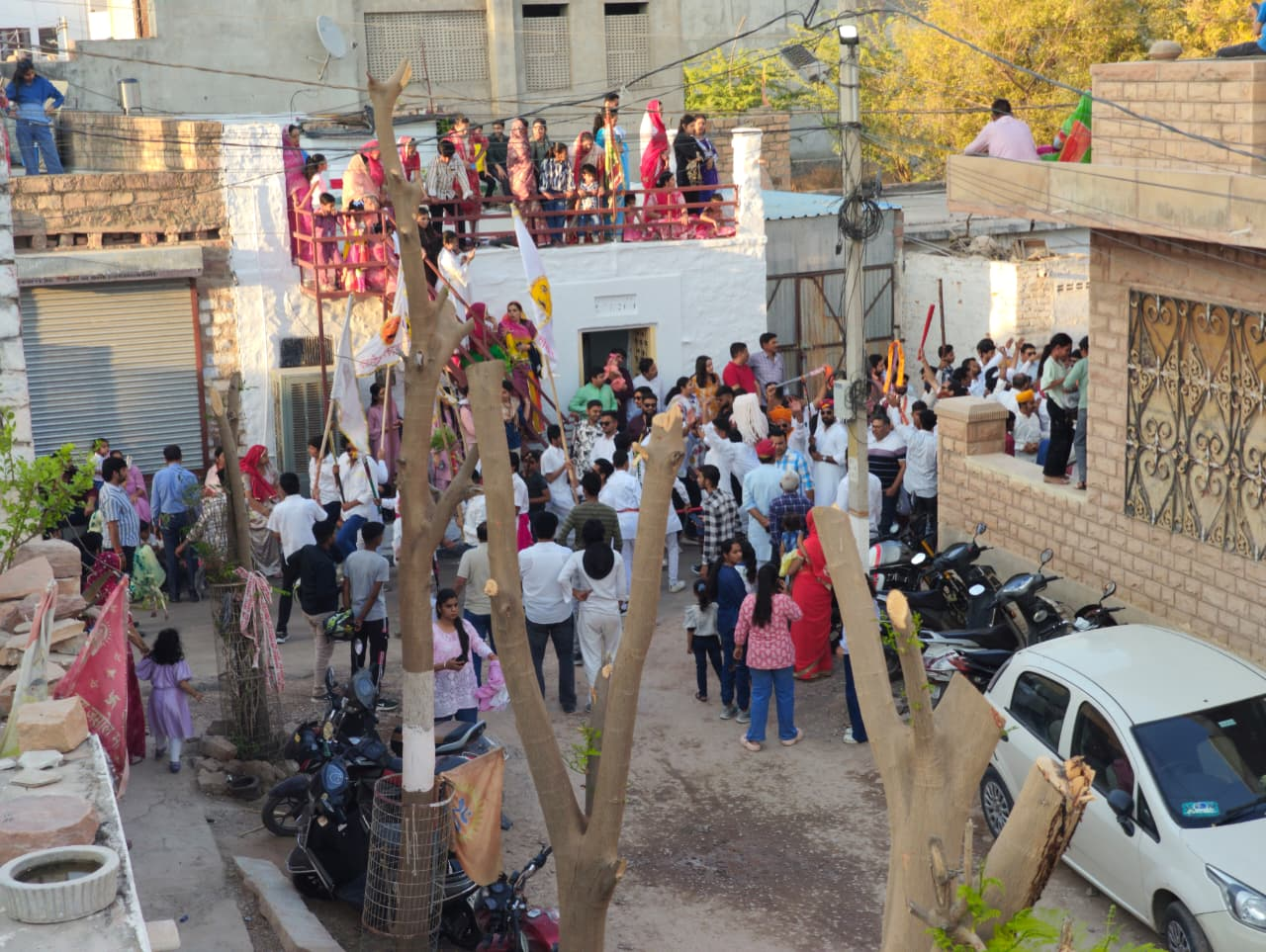
Cordon for procession, 2026

The safety of the Rao is managed by a security cordon formed by youths from the Mandawata Bera. They carry wooden sticks and hockey sticks and maintain a protective perimeter around him throughout the five-hour journey. Women are excluded from the main procession. This custom is attributed to the singing of traditional folk songs featuring explicit or ribald lyrics.

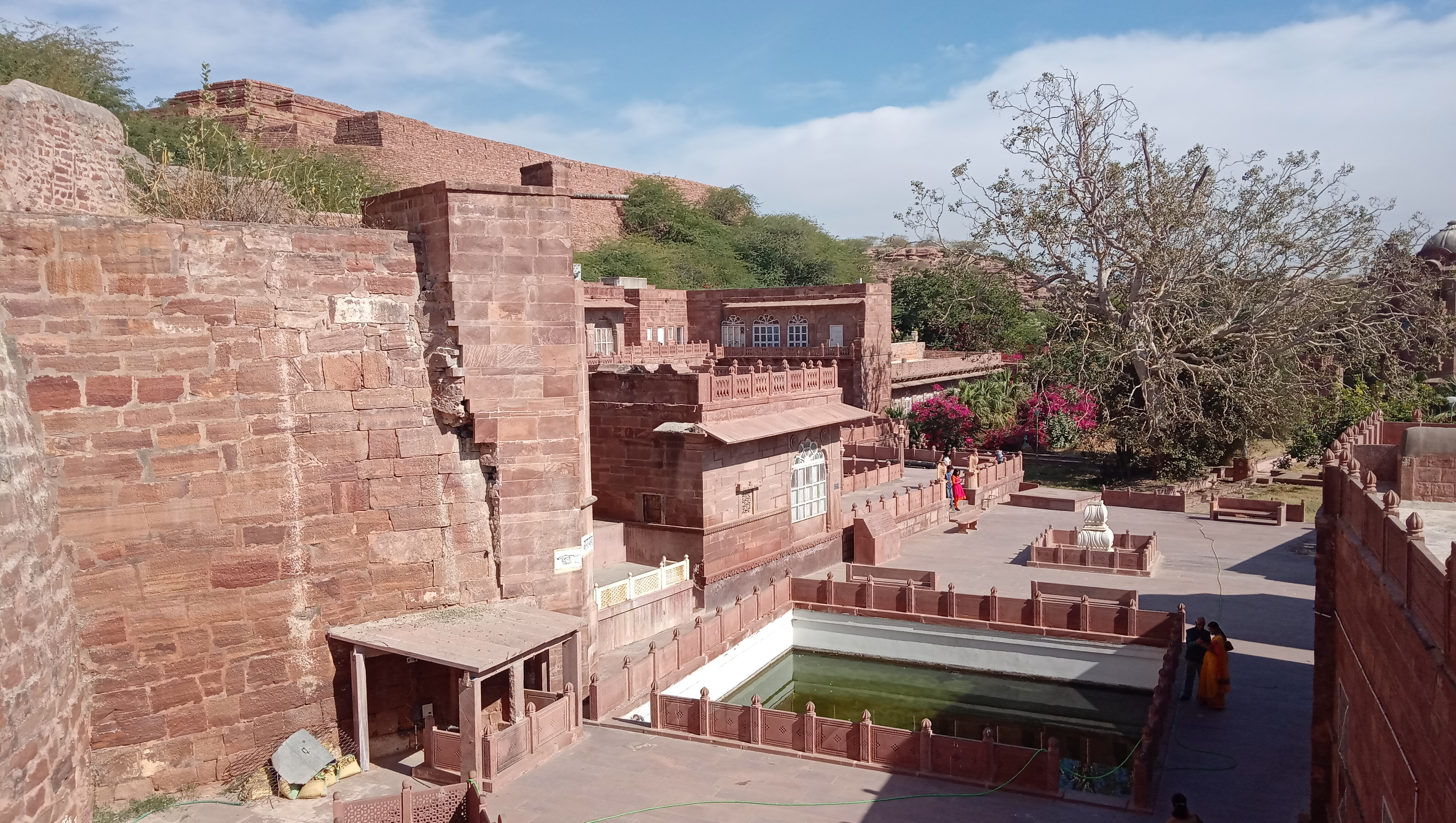
Nag Ganga in Government Museum Complex

The procession concludes when the Rao performs a ritual jump into the ancient Nag Ganga (also known as Nag kund) pond, a small pond situated within the Government Museum complex of the gardens. This act signifies the end of the festival and the symbolic conclusion of the Rao's one-day reign.

== See also ==
- Holi
- Mandore
- Culture of Rajasthan
- Marwar
