= Amet =

- town
- Location in Rajasthan, India
- Coordinates: 25.3025°N 73.9295°E
- Country: India
- State: Rajasthan
- District: Rajsamand
- Elevation: 575 m (1,886 ft)

Population (2001)
  - Total: 16,669

Languages
  - Official: Hindi
- Time zone: UTC+5:30 (IST)

Amet is a town and a municipality located in Rajsamand district in the Indian state of Rajasthan.

== History ==
Amet is historically significant. Amet was estate under erstwhile Mewar state, consisted of 26 villages. It was owned by Chundawats, descendants of Chunda Sisodia, son of Maharana Lakha, with title of Rawat. Patta Sisodia great-grandson of Chunda Sisodia. who fought against Mughals in Chittorgarh fort, during the reign of Maharana of Mewar Udai Singh. Patta's son, Karan Singh was granted Amet by Maharana Pratap.

== Demographics ==
As of 2001 India census, Amet had a population of 16,669. Males constitute 51% of the population and females 49%. Amet has an average literacy rate of 66%, higher than the national average of 59.5%; with 59% of males and 41% of females literate. 15% of the population is under 6 years of age.

== Tourist attractions ==
=== Vevar Mahadev ===
Vevar Mahadev is a temple of Shiva and a notable tourist attraction. It is situated near the bank of the river Chandrabhaga surrounded by the Aravalli Range. Jaisingh Shyam Ji temple

The temple of Lord Jaisingh Shyam Ji stands in the heart of Amet. Small lakes include Ranerao Lake, Salam Sagar, Pratap Sagar, and two anicuts near Karani Mata Bagh and Vevar Mahadev. Veer Patta was the noble of Thikana Amet and one of the heroes during the third johar of Chittorgarh. His statute stands at Veer Patta Circle on the Amet-Kelwa road. The Amet palace is also a historical place to visit. Wadli Wavli is where the temples of Lord Shanker and Hanuman are situated. Shiv Nal and Shim Mataji are also very picturesque places near Amet.

=== Lakes ===
There are a few small lakes, which fills during good monsoon -Ranerao lake, Salam sagar, Pratap sagar and two anicuts near Karani Mata bagh and Vevar Mahadev.

=== Cattle fair ===
Every year during Navratri festival five-day cattle fair is organised. All nearby villages take part in it. It is held at mela ground opposite choti shikarbadi. Jaljulani ekadassi is also celebrated with great fervour and devotion.

=== Laxmi bazar ===
The Laxmi bazar is a textile and cloth market in Amet that serves the residents of nearby villages. Similarly, the Jaisinghshyam goshala is also on Jilola Road. The Festival of Holi is one of the major festivals celebrated in this bazar.

== Economy ==
Amet is famous for its Marble & Granite Business and its major source of economy. There are currently more than 50 marble & granite processing units are working along the Amet-Kelwa road.

Other than marble, it used to be famous Kapda Mandi (Cloth Market) for nearby area of approx 100 km radius. It is still the second major source of town's economy.
