= Hammir Singh =

Maharana of Mewar from 1326 to 1364

- Maharana
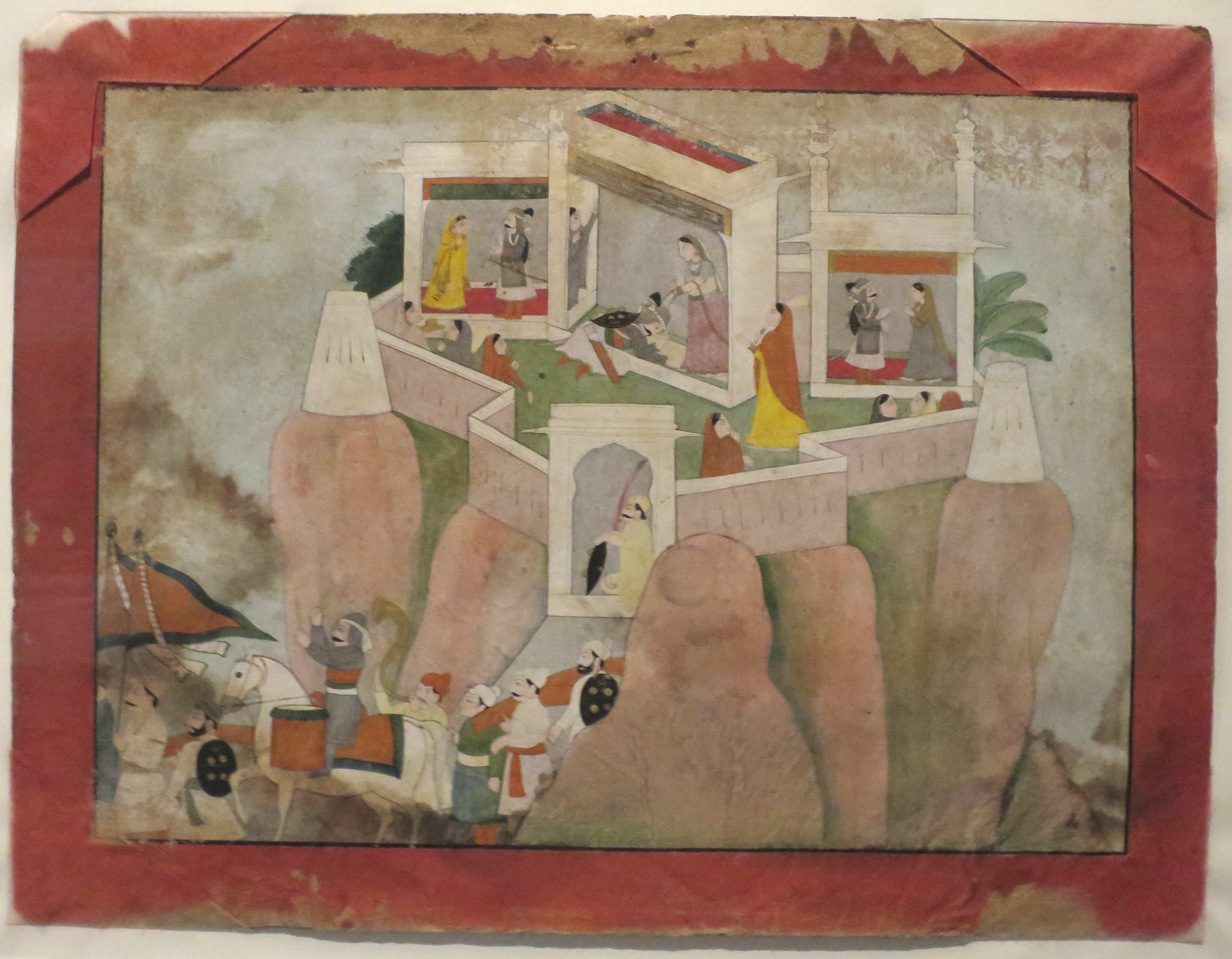

Maharana of Mewar
- Reign: 1326–1364
- Predecessor: Ari Singh
- Successor: Kshetra Singh
- Born: 1302
- Died: 1364 (aged 61–62)
- Spouse: Songari Devi of Jalore
- Issue: Kshetra Singh; Loona; Khangar; Varisaal
- Dynasty: Sisodia
- Father: Ari Singh
- Mother: Urmila
- Religion: Hinduism

Maharana Hammir Singh (1302–1364), or Hammir, was the Maharana of Mewar from 1326 until his death in 1364. Hammir Singh, was a scion of the cadet branch Rana of the Guhila dynasty, who regained control of the region, re-established the dynasty after defeating the Tughlaq dynasty, and captured present-day Rajasthan from Muslim forces of Delhi and became the first of the 'Rana' branch to become the King of Mewar with title of Maharana. Hammir also became the progenitor of the Sisodia clan, a branch of the Guhila dynasty, to which every succeeding Maharana of Mewar has belonged.

Mewar during Rana Hammir's reign, was one of the few Hindu states that had withstood the Turkic invasions. According to John Darwin "Only in Mewar and in Vijaynagar had Hindu states withstood the deluge".

Mahavir Prasad Prashasti identify to Hammir as Vanquisher of Turushkas. After regaining Chittor, he built the Annapoorna Mata temple in Chittor Fort dedicated to Aai Birwadi. He also built the old temple of Roopnarayan Ji in Sewantri.

== Relations with the Rawal Branch ==
Ancestors of Hammir Singh connecting to the Guhila Rawal Branch of Chittor are:

- Ratnasimha
- Rahapa
- Narapati
- Dinakara
- Jasakarna
- Nagapala
- Karnapala
- Prithvipal
- Bhuvanasimha
- Bhimasimha
- Jayasimha
- Lakhanasimha
- Arisimha (Arasi)
- Hammira (Hammir Singh)

== Early years ==
Rana Laksha of Sisoda had nine sons, of whom the eldest was Ari Singh, who married Urmila, a Chandaana Chauhan Rajput lady from the village of Unnava near Kelwara. Rana Hammir was the only child of this couple.

At the turn of the 13th century, Alauddin Khilji attacked Chittorgarh, Rana Laksha and his sons joined the garrison at Chittorgarh to defend it against the invading army. Rana Laksha died along with his seven sons performing saka (fighting to death) at the end of Siege of Chittorgarh. Ruling Rawal branch of Chittorgarh ceased to exist, as they all died performing saka. Ajay Singh (son of Lakshman Singh) was wounded and was smuggled out of Chittorgarh to preserve the blood line. He reached Kelwara and recovered of his wounds there. There he found out about Hammir and called him from Unnava. Rana Hammir killed Bhil Chief Munja Balecha of Godwar, who was causing chaos in the nearby area. This event impressed his uncle and Hammir was chosen as the successor to the throne.

Lakshman Singh was Thakur of Sisoda village. He died along with his seven sons performing saka (fighting to death), while their women committed jauhar (self-immolation in preference to becoming enemy captives). Laksha was descended in direct patrician lineage from Bappa Rawal and hence belonged to the Gehlot (Guhilot) clan. Laksha came from the village of Sisoda near the town of Nathdwara and thus his children came to be known as Sisodia.

== Recovering Chittorgarh ==
Khaljis allocated administration of Chittorgarh to Sonagara Maldev, ruler of the nearby state of Jalore. After becoming the Rana of Sisoda, Hammir pursued an aggressive scheme of recovering Mewar.

He made several attempts at capturing Chittor, but failed, due to which his resources dwindled and many of his followers left. Hammir, wishing to give rest to his men and regroup, ceased the attacks and started on a pilgrimage to Dwarka with his remaining men. On the way, he camped at the Khod village in Gujarat, where lived a known mystic Charan lady Aai Birwadi who was considered an incarnation of Hinglaj. Hammir paid homage and recounted his setbacks, at which he was advised to return to Mewar and make preparations for another attack. Hammir responded that he no longer has the manpower and capacity to launch another attack. The mystic Birwadi Mata assured him that her son Baruji Charan and his clansmen will join him in Mewar.

In a few days, Baruji, a rich dealer in horses, arrived with a large caravan of 500 horses at Kherwara, where Hammir had camped.

In a requirement to settle his rule, Maldev arranged for the marriage of his daughter Songari with Rana Hammir. Khiljis didn't like this matrimonial alliance and they took back Chittorgarh from Maldev and gave him Merta. This prompted Hammir to strive for expelling the Khilji's army from Mewar. Hammir and his Charan allies led by Baruji Sauda mounted an attack and succeeded to gain Chittorgarh after Muhammad bin Tughluq came to the throne.

== Conflict against the Tughluq dynasty ==
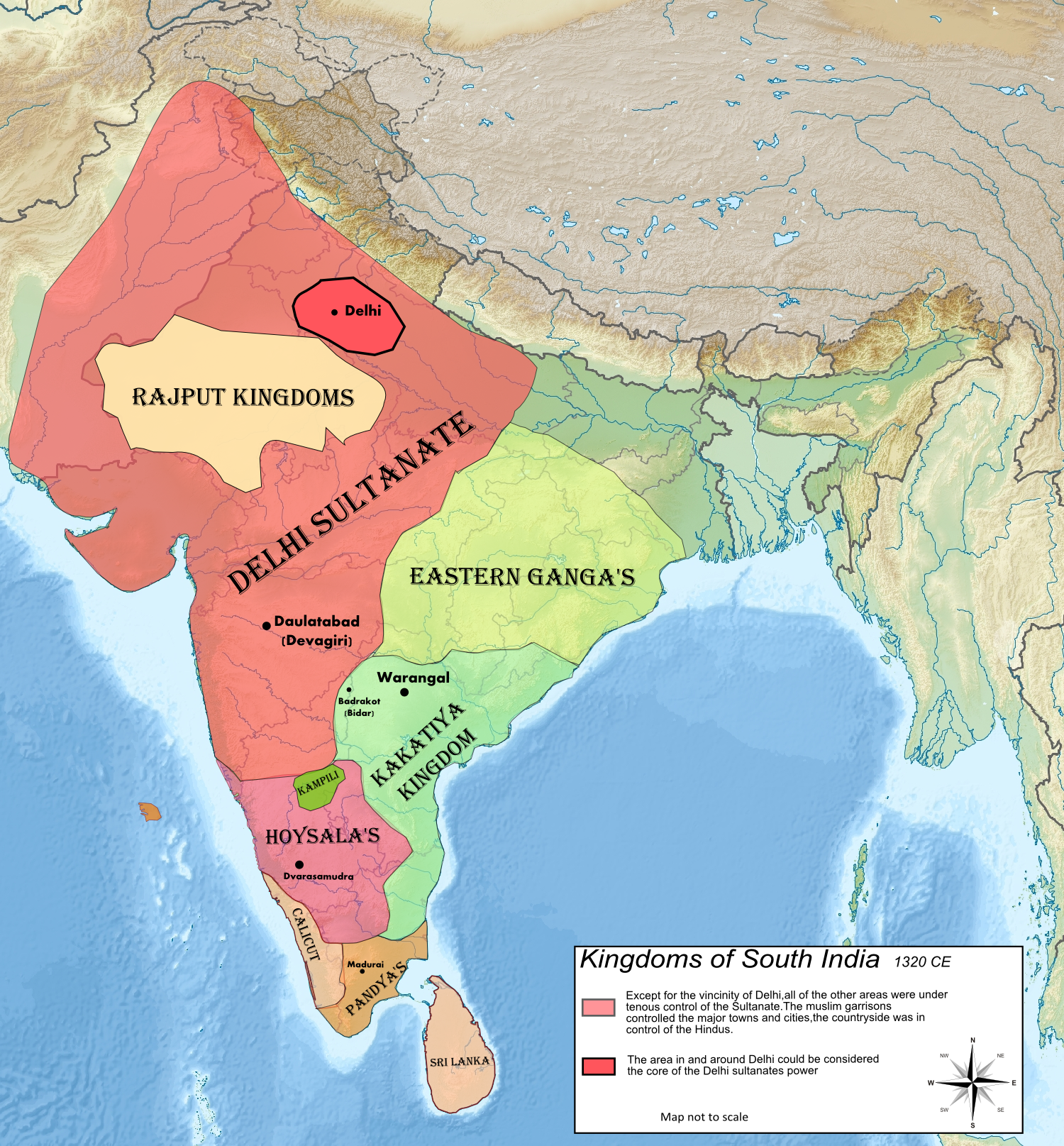
After Rana Hammir's victory over Sultan of Delhi's forces in Battle of Singoli whole of the Rajputana was liberated from the Sultanate's rule.

The Rajput bardic chronicles such as Nainsi ri Khyat by Nainsi (17th century) claim that amid the turmoil caused by the end of the Khalji dynasty in Delhi, Hammir Singh gained control of Mewar. He evicted Maldev's son Jaiza, the Chauhan vassal of the Delhi Sultanate, from Mewar. Jaiza fled to Delhi, prompting the Delhi Sultan Muhammad bin Tughluq to march against Hammir Singh. According to Muhnot Nainsi, Hammir Singh defeated Tughluq near the Singoli village, in the Battle of Singoli and imprisoned the Sultan. He then released the Sultan six months later, after the Sultanate ceded to him Ajmer, Ranthambor, Nagaur and Sooespur, and paid 5 million rupees and 100 elephants as ransom. However, these claims are lacked by corroborative evidences. The Delhi army was led by another general, but not Muhammad himself. Therefore the conflict where Sisodias defeated Delhi Sultanate at Singoli altogether cannot be regarded baseless, but the version of the defeat of Muhammad Bin Tughlaq and his imprisonment cannot be concluded as true.

A 1438 Jain temple inscription attests that Rana Hammir Singh forces defeated a Muslim army; this army may have been led by a general of Muhammad bin Tughluq. It is possible that subsequently, Muhammad bin Tughluq and his successors did not assert their authority in the present-day Rajasthan, and Hammir Singh's authority was recognised by other Rajput chiefs, making Mewar practically independent of the Delhi Sultanate.

== In popular culture ==
Rana Hamir is a 1925 Indian silent film about the monarch by Baburao Painter.

== See also ==
- List of Rajputs
- List of battles of Rajasthan

== Bibliography ==
- D. C. Ganguly (1957). "Northern India During The Eleventh and Twelfth Centuries". In R. C. Majumdar (ed.). The Struggle for Empire. The History and Culture of the Indian People. Bharatiya Vidya Bhavan. OCLC 26241249.
- Ram Vallabh Somani (1976). History of Mewar, from Earliest Times to 1751 A.D. Mateshwari. OCLC 2929852.
- Ojha, G.H.. (1932). History of Rajputana, Part 2. Ajmer.
