= Rawal Mallinath =

14th-century folk hero of Rajasthan

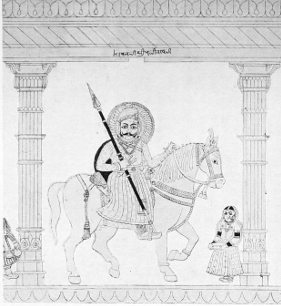
- Illustration of Rawal Mallinath, based on a rock sculpture at Mandore, published in Annals and Antiquities of Rajasthan (vol. II)
- Other names: Mallinathji
- Battles: Conquering Malani, Defeating Muslim forces
- Adherents: People of Thar Desert
- Region: Rajasthan, India
- Festivals: Mallinath cattle fair

Genealogy
- Parents: Rao Salkhaji (father)
- Siblings: Rao Jaitmal Ji, Viramdeo (brothers)
- Consort: Rani Rupade

Rawal Mallinath is a 14th-century folk hero of Rajasthan. He was the eldest son of Rao Salkhaji, the ruler of Mehwanagar in Barmer District. He and his wife, Rani Rupade, are revered as folk saints in Western Rajasthan.

== Military career ==
He ruled from Sindh in the west and Jaisalmer in the north. Initially he took refuge with his uncle Kanhad at Bhiradkot. When Firuz Shah Tughluq sent tax collectors, Kanhad Dev killed them all except one who was saved by Mallinath, who escorted the sole tax collector to Delhi The Sultan was pleased and granted Mehwa as a Jagir to Mallinath. Kanhad's son Tribhuvansi succeeded Kahnhad. In 1374 A.D. Mallinath with the help of Muslim forces of Delhi defeated Tribhuvansi who died after poison was put on his wounds by his brother Padamsingh.

In 1394, he sent a contingent under his nephew Rao Chunda to annex Mandore and defeated Muslim force and annexed Mandore. His military career is admired for defeating the thirteen division of the Mohamaddan Army of Nijjamudin of Malwa and Firoz Shah Tughlaq. He conquered the whole of the area which later became known as Malani. He was the first chief of the area to take the title of Rawal. Legend it has that he possessed divine powers and goddess herself appeared before him.

== Family ==
Mallinath was the eldest son of Rawal Salkhaji. He had two brothers, Viramdeo and Jaitmal. His father died when was of twelve years. The houses of Jodhpur, Bikaner, Ratlam, Sitamau, Sailana, Idar, and Alirajpur trace their lineage to Viramdeo, while the houses of Gudamalani and Kelwa trace their lineage from Jaitmal.

He died in 1399 in Dodiali with his wife, Rupade being Sati on him.

Mallinath was succeeded by his eldest son, Jagmal, after his death. The descendants of Jagmal and his Muslim wife Gindoli (described as the daughter of Mahmud Begada in some narratives) are referred to as Mahecha Rathores, the oldest among all houses of Rathore clan.

Rawal Mallinath is viewed as a warrior-saint, and songs of his heroic valour and saintly attitude are still sung by folk singers of western Rajasthan. His wife Rani Rupade was also a saint – bhajans composed by her are still popular in Western Rajasthan.

== Events ==
The Mallinath cattle fair is held every year at Tilwara in Barmer district. It is the biggest cattle fair in Rajasthan. The Mallinath Fair often features highly popular breeds of animals including cows, camels, sheep, goats, and horses. People from as far away as Gujarat and Madhya Pradesh attend the fair seeking good prices on livestock. It is said that the fair originated when admirers of Rawal Mallinath, a popular local hero, gathered in Tilwara, riding on well-bred animals to meet him. There is a shrine of Mallinath, where people pray with the belief that their wishes will be granted. If their wishes are fulfilled, it is customary to offer miniature horse statues as a token of thanks to the shrine. One can see wood, brass, and bronze horses being sold by the traders who come from Mathura, Agra, and Aligarh in Uttar Pradesh. There are other shops selling general merchandise, fodder, and agricultural tools.

The fair opens with the hoisting of the flag of Rawal Mallinathji and songs praising his valor and greatness. The fair features bullock, camel, and horse races on the dry riverbed. The animals that win are crowned with white badges and are sold for higher prices at the fair.

== See also ==
- Hukam Singh Bhati (1990), Maheca Rathaurom ka mula itihasa: Ravala Mallinatha ke vamsaja - Maheca, Baramera, Pokarana, Kotariya aura Khavariya Rathaurom ka sodhapurna itihasa. Publisher: Ratan Prakashan, Jodhpur.
