= Chundawat =

Sub-clan of Sisodia Rajputs

Chundawat is a clan of the Sisodia Rajputs of Mewar and were powerful chiefs in the Kingdom of Mewar. They are the descendants of the 15th-century Mewari prince Chunda Sisodia, the eldest son of Maharana Lakha. Having surrendered his right to the throne to his younger brother Mokal Singh, Chunda gained for his descendants the right to advise the reigning Maharana on matters of State as well as an exalted position on the royal council.

There major fiefs in Mewar are Salumbar, Begu, Amet, Deogarh, Bhainsrorgarh, Kurabar, Asind and Meja.
