= Battle of Dholpur =

1519 battle in India

- Part of List of Mewar (Sisodiya)–Delhi conflicts
Date	1519
Location	Dholpur
Result	Mewar victory
Territorial changes	The boundaries of Rana Sanga's military influence came to extend within striking distance of Agra.; Chanderi bestowed to Medini Rai.; Gwalior captured

Belligerents
Kingdom of Mewar: Kingdom of Amber; Kingdom of Chanderi	Delhi Sultanate

Commanders and leaders
Rana Sanga; Manik Chand Chauhan; Prithviraj kachwaha Ratan Singh Chundawat; Rajrana Ajja Jhala; Haridas Kesaria; Rao Ramdas; Gokaldas Parmar; Medini Rai; Kam Dev Sikarwar	Ibrahim Lodi; Khan Khanan Farmuli; Mian Maruf; Mian Makhan; Said Khan Furat †; Haji Khan †; Daulat Khan †; Allahdad khan †; Yusuf Khan †; Farookh Bazai †

The Battle of Dholpur in today's India occurred between the Kingdom of Mewar, led by Rana Sanga, and the Lodi dynasty of the Delhi Sultanate, commanded by Ibrahim Lodi, culminating in a victory for Mewar.

After his defeat to Sanga at the Battle of Khatoli, Lodi prepared to retaliate against Sanga. The Mewar forces were strained as they were engaged in conflicts with the Sultans of Malwa and Gujarat. The battle, near Dholpur, witnessed a successful charge by the Mewar army, resulting in the defeat of the opposing forces. Following this victory, Sanga extended his conquests to encompass much of present-day Rajasthan.

== Aftermath ==
As a result of this victory, the territories of Malwa, previously seized by Muhammad Shah (Sahib Khan), the younger brother of Sultan Mahmud Khilji II of Mandu during his rebellion against his brother, and later annexed by Sultan Sikander Lodi, father of Sultan Ibrahim Lodi, came under the control of Rana Sanga, the Maharana of Mewar. Chanderi was among the territories captured by the Maharana, who subsequently bestowed it as a gift upon Medini Rai.The fortress of Gwalior was also captured. Ibrahim Lodi attempted to besiege the forts of Ranthambhore and Ajmer, which were under the control of Rana Sanga, but he faced defeat for the third time.
