= Battle of Chanderi =

Babur's invasion of Chanderi (1528)

- Part of Mughal–Rajput wars
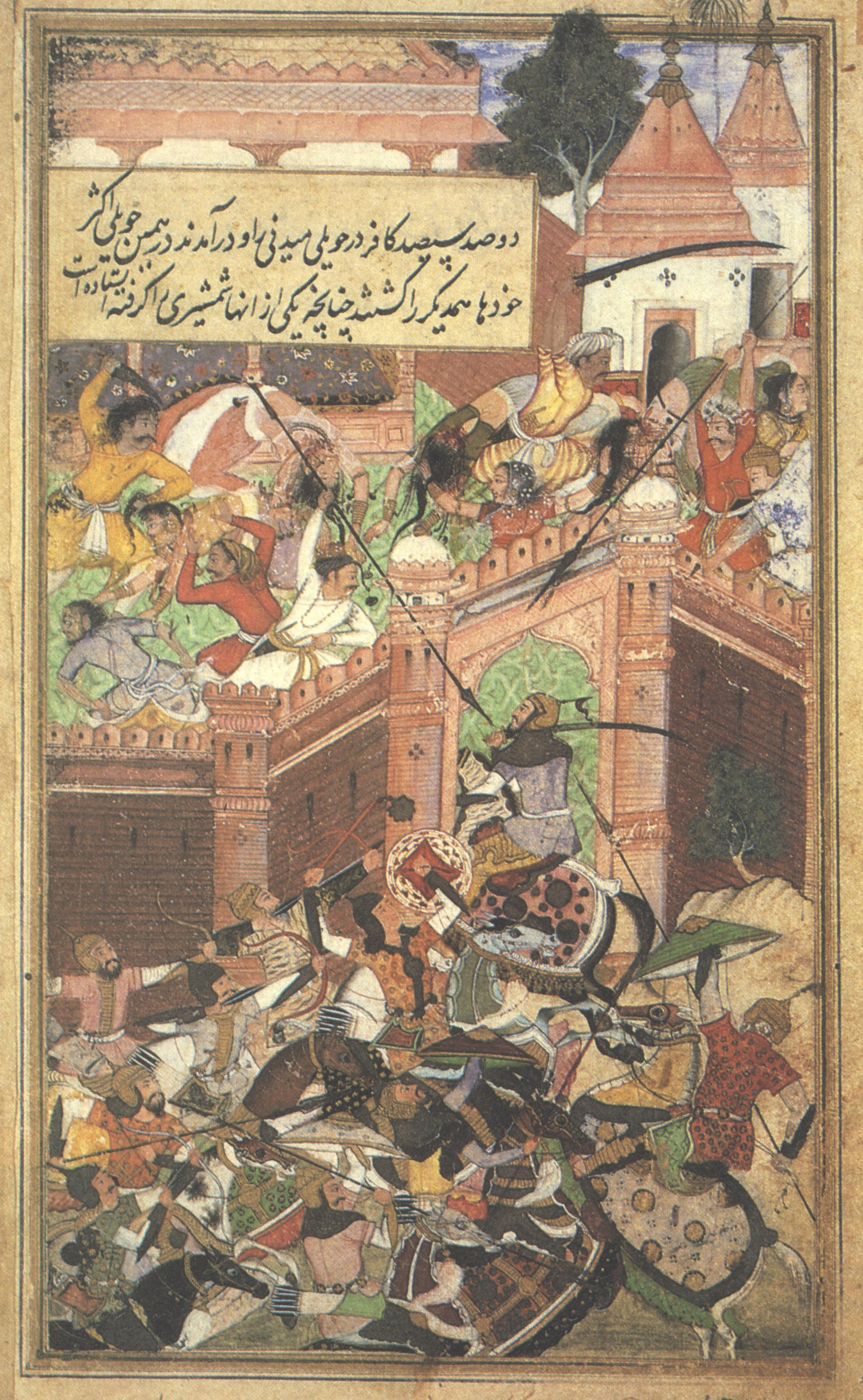
- Illustration of the battle from Baburnama
Date	20 January 1528
Location	Chanderi, Madhya Pradesh (near Ashok Nagar) 24.7°N 78.1°E
Result	Mughal victory
Territorial changes	Chanderi annexed into the Mughal Empire.

Belligerents
Mughal Empire	Chanderi Rajputs

Commanders and leaders
Babur	Medini Rai †

Strength
Unknown	15,000
- Location within South Asia Battle of Chanderi (Madhya Pradesh)

The Battle of Chanderi or Siege of Chanderi (1528) took place in the aftermath of the Battle of Khanwa in which the Mughal Emperor Babur had defeated the Rajput Confederacy and firmly establish Mughal rule while crushing regrowing Rajput powers as the battle was fought for supremacy of Northern India between Rajputs and Mughals.

== Background ==
On receiving news that Rana Sanga had renewed war preparations to renew the conflict with him, Babur decided to isolate the Rana by inflicting a military defeat on one of his vassals Medini Rai who was the ruler of Malwa. Consequently, in December 1527, taking a circumlocution route Babur marched to the fortress of Chanderi in Malwa which was the capital of the kingdom of Malwa.

== Battle ==
Upon reaching Chanderi, on 20 January 1528, Babur offered Shamsabad to Medini Rai in exchange for Chanderi as a peace overture but the offer was rejected by Rai. The outer fortress of Chanderi was taken by Babur's army at night, and the next morning the upper fort was captured. Babur expressed surprise that the upper fort had fallen within an hour of the final assault.

Medini Rai organized the Jauhar ceremony during which Rajput women and children committed self-immolation to save their honour from the Mughals. A small number of soldiers also collected in Medini Rai's house and proceeded to slay each other in collective suicide. This sacrifice does not seem to have impressed Babur who did not express any admiration for it in his autobiography. Rather, as he had done after Khanwa, he ordered a tower of skulls (a practice formulated by Timur against opponents)—to be erected. According to Satish Chandra, this practice was to record a monumental victory and terrorize opponents, Babur had earlier used the same tactic against the Afghans of Bajaur.

== See also ==
- Battle of Khanwa
- First Battle of Panipat
- Siege of Raisen

== Bibliography ==
- Chaurasia, Radhey Shyam (2002). History of Medieval India: From 1000 A.D. to 1707 A.D. Atlantic Publishers & Dist. ISBN 978-81-269-0123-4.
- Sharma, Gopi Nath (1954). Mewar & the Mughal Emperors (1526–1707 A.D.). S.L. Agarwala.
