= Rao Chunda =

Rao of Marwar from 1384 to 1428

Rao Chunda Rathore
- Rao

Rao of Marwar
- Reign: 1384–1428
- Predecessor: Rao Viram Dev
- Successor: Rao Kanha
- Died: 1428
- Spouse: Pratihar Rajput princess; Rani Suram Sankhali; Rani Sona Mohil
- Issue: Kanha; Ranmal; Hansa Bai
- Father: Viramdev

Rao Chunda Rathore (died 1428) was the 12th Rao of Marwar from 1384 until his death in 1428. His reign saw the consolidation of Rathore rule in Marwar, through his diplomatic and military prowess.

== Early life ==
Chunda's father Viramdev died in a battle against the Johiyas, resulting in the annexation of his inheritance. Chunda was given refuge by a Charan named Alhaji Barhath who raised him at his home in Kalau village. As Chunda grew older, Alhaji equipped him with a horse and weapons and presented him to his uncle Rawal Mallinath. His uncle granted him a small outpost of Salavari which was given to him for his maintenance. Chunda was a skilled warrior and leader and he soon started expanding his holdings.

== Reign ==
In 1395 the Pratihars of Mandore approached Chunda and proposed an alliance against the Tughlaq Empire. Chunda agreed and was married to a Pratihar princess, he was further given the fortified city of Mandore and a thousand villages in dowry. This incident was recorded in an old Rajasthani(Dingal) couplet:

"ईदौं रो उपकार, कमधज कदे न बीसरे, चूँडै चंवरी चाड़, दी मंडोवर दायजै।"

which translates as:

"The Rathore shall always remember the obligation of the Indas who gave a daughter in marriage and Mandowar in dowry to Rao Chunda."

The Tughlaq Empire soon reacted by sending an army under Zafar Khan, the governor of Gujarat. Chunda was able to successfully defend Mandore against this army, Timur's invasion further forced Zafar to start negotiations with Chunda. Chunda had agreed to pay tribute to the Tughlaqs after this battle, but he later reneged and invaded Tughlaq territory, capturing Sambhar, Didwana, Khatu and Ajmer. He continued his expansion and defeated the Chauhans of Nadol and captured their lands. Chunda also attacked his brother Jai Singh for not helping him against the Tughlaqs and captured Phalodi. Chunda captured and occupied Nagaur in 1408 AD and decided to stay there leaving Mandore under the charge of one of his sons. Chunda secured an alliance with Rana Lakha during this time through his daughter Hansa.

== Death ==
Chunda's aggressive expansion intimidated the surrounding chieftains, who made an alliance against him. This alliance included Rao Kelana of Pugal, Sankhlas of Janglu and Khidar Khan of Multan. They attacked Chunda and surrounded him at Nagaur. There was treachery in Chunda's army and therefore, Chunda did not anticipate the attack and was not able to make preparations to give battle. Finding no way out of the situation, he charged his enemies and was killed in action. Chunda's wife Sona urged him to appoint their son Kanha, as his successor. Ranmal was Chunda's eldest son however Chunda declared his younger son Kanha as his heir to appease Sona. Ranmal therefore left Marwar and went to the neighbouring kingdom of Mewar.
