= Medini Rai =

Rajput chieftain of Malwa and Mewar (d. 1528)

Vizier of Malwa Sultanate
- In office 1511–1518
- Appointed by: Mahmud Khilji II

Personal details
- Died: Chanderi, Madhya Pradesh
- Children: Rai Pithaura; Badan; Two more daughters

Military service
- Allegiance: Malwa Sultanate (1511–1518); Kingdom of Mewar (1518–1528)
- Years of service: 1511–1528
- Commands: Malwa
- Battles/wars: Battle of Dholpur; Battle of Gagron; Battle of Bayana; Battle of Khanwa; Battle of Chanderi †

Medini Rai born Rai Chand Purbia was a Wazir of the Malwa Sultanate during Mahmud Khalji II later a feudal chief of Kingdom of Mewar under Rana Sanga. Rai ruled much of the Malwa region under the lordship of the Rana, who helped him in defeating the Sultan of Malwa, Mahmud Khilji II, and conquering Malwa. He established Chanderi as the capital.

== Career under Malwa Sultanate ==
In 1511, during civil war between Sahib Khan and Mahmud Khalji II, Rai Chand Purbia came from his thana and joined the latter. The Sultan appointed him as Wazir and honoured with the title of Medini Rai. In the battle between Mahmud and Sahib Khan, Medni Rai and his troops fought with exceptional courage, completely routing Sahib Khan. He soon uncovered that two amirs Afzal Khan and Iqbal Khan were conducting covert negotiations with Sahib Khan at Gawil. Upon reporting the conspiracy to the Sultan, Medni Rai received orders that both nobles be executed immediately when they presented themselves at court. The sudden execution of Afzal Khan and Iqbal Khan sent shockwaves through the nobility.

=== Rebellion of Sikandar Khan ===
Sikandar Khan, the governor of Satwas rebelled, occupying territory from Khandwa to Shahabad and seizing royal revenue. On 18 August 1512, Sultan Mahmud marched to suppress the rebellion. He ordered Mansur Khan to lead the expedition. Mansur Khan hesitated to march against Sikandar. He even defected to Sikandar Khan out of fear of Medini Rai. Deprived of loyal Muslim amirs, Mahmud dispatched Medini Rai to quell the uprising. Medini Rai decisively attacked Satwas, forced Sikandar Khan to submit, and then successfully advocated for the Sultan to pardon Sikandar Khan and restore his lands.

Later, in November 1513, In Sahib Khan fled Malwa to join Sikandar Lodi's army. He later returned with a Delhi army contingent, occupying Chanderi where he was installed as a figurehead Sultan. Sultan Mahmud attacked led by Medini Rai and his troops, decisively defeated the Delhi forces, and captured Chanderi on 7 December 1514.

== Career under Mewar ==
The conquest of Malwa shocked the court of Delhi as they were not expecting the Rajputs to invade Malwa. This led to several skirmishes and battles between the Delhi Sultanate and the Kingdom of Mewar. Medini Rai actively helped Rana Sanga in these battles and helped him score a series of victories. Rana Sanga's influence after the war extended to Pilia Khar, a river on the outskirts of Agra. He assisted Rana Sanga in many campaigns against the Sultans of India. He joined the united Rajput Confederacy in the fateful Battle of Khanwa with a garrison of 20,000 Rajput soldiers and headed the left wing of Rajputs to counter Babur's right wing. Medini Rai was later killed in the Battle of Chanderi against the Mughal emperor Babur, where he was given a chance to surrender but chose to fight and remain loyal to the Rana.

== Family ==
Two of his sons Rai Pithaura and Badan were slain during the siege of Mandu. Muzaffar Shah also captured two of his daughters and one wife.

== Bibliography ==
- Sharma, Gopi Nath (1954). Mewar & the Mughal Emperors (1526-1707 A.D.). S.L. Agarwala.
- Chaurasia, Radhey Shyam (2002). History of Medieval India: From 1000 A.D. to 1707 A.D. Atlantic Publishers & Dist. ISBN 978-81-269-0123-4.
- Day, Upendra Nath (1965). Medieval Malwa: A Political and Cultural History, 1401-1562. Munshi Ram Manohar Lal. ISBN 978-81-215-0401-0.
