= Bakrol =

- village
- Location in Gujarat, India Bakrol (India)
- Coordinates: 22°33′50″N 72°54′40″E
- Country: India
- State: Gujarat
- District: Anand

Languages
  - Official: Gujarati, Hindi
- Time zone: UTC+5:30 (IST)
- Vehicle registration: GJ-
- Coastline: 0 kilometres (0 mi)
- Website: gujaratindia.com

Bakrol is an Indian village. It has recently become a part of Anand, Gujarat.

The village is about 8 kilometres (5 mi) from Anand and is next to Vallabh Vidhyanagar within the Anand Taluka. The name of the village is so, because it was native of Demon Bakasur.

Many villagers have settled overseas. The main occupation of those remaining is agriculture. Major crops are wheat, potato and banana. There is a cold storage and five tobacco store houses in the outskirts in the village. The village has tar roads, a library, a maternity home, marriage hall, milk producers union, co-operative soc. Schools, a Bank, Post Office and various Temples.

Recently it has become a " NAGAR PALIKA " & patch up with Anand. It is near to Vitthal Udhyognagar, a major industrial area of Gujarat.

== Demographics ==
As of the 2001 India census, Bakrol had a population of 19,738. Males constitute 52% of the population and females 48%. 11% of the population is under 6 years of age.

There is also another village called Bakrol within Gujarat. It is located approximately 18 km away from the city of Ahmedabad. This village consists of mainly farms, most of which grow wheat, rice, and corn. The population of this village is 10000.
