= Sauda (clan) =

Charan clan

Sauda (Devnagari: सौदा चारण; IAST: Saudā) (also spelled Soda, Souda) is a clan of the Charanas. They are also known as Sauda-Barhath. Sauda Charans came to prominence in the kingdom of Mewar with the establishment of Sisodia dynasty in 1326.

== History ==
The founder of the Sauda clan was Baruji, a Charan from Khod village of Kutch (Gujarat). Baruji was a wealthy horse trader. When the Guhilot dynasty was displaced from Mewar following an invasion by the Delhi Sultanate at the turn of the 13th century, Baruji provided military assistance to Rana Hammir and lent him 500 of his horses. Baruji and his men fought alongside Rana Hammir in the invasion of Chittor.

After successfully capturing Chittor, Rana Hammir awarded the position of Prolpat (Barhath) of Mewar kingdom to Baruji, to be held by his descendants "for posterity".

Baruji's descendants came to be known as 'Sauda', a title given by Rana Hammir as they were large horse traders (saudagar). In Mewar, the descendants of Baruji reside in Soniyana (near Kankroli), Paaner, Aantri, Panod, Barwara, Tallai, Bikakheda and Rabachha.

== Notable people ==
- Thakur Kesari Singh Barhath
- Thakur Zorawar Singh Barhath
- Kunwar Pratap Singh Barhath
