= S. Devadas Pillai =

Indian sociologist

S. Devadas Pillai (born 1935- fallecido en 2022) was an Indian sociologist.

== Life ==
Pillai completed his MA and PhD at the Department of Sociology at the University of Bombay. His 1964 PhD thesis was subsequently published as Men And Machines (1968). Pillai was an urban sociologist trained in the 'Bombay School' of G. S. Ghurye and colleagues like A. R. Desai and K. M. Kapadia. Pillai's research into urban slums in Bombay was supervised by Desai. He co-authored with Desai and Kapadia, and in 1997 published a dictionary to Ghurye's sociology.

In later life Pillai devoted effort to cultural research. He was executive editor of the 2011 Oxford Encyclopaedia of the Music of India, and in 2019 published a study of the stories of the Malayalam writer Karoor Neelakanta Pillai.

Falleció en 2022 a los 87 años

== Works ==
- Men and machines. Bombay: Popular Prakashan, 1968.
- (ed with A. R. Desai) Slums and urbanization. Bombay: Popular Prakashan, 1970.
- (with K. M. Kapadia) Young runaways: a study of children who desert home. Bombay: Popular Prakashan, 1971.
- 'The Study of Age at Marriage – Some Neglected Issues', The Indian Journal of Social Research, Vol. 12, No. 3 (Dec 1971)
- (with A. R. Desai) Profile of an Indian slum. Bombay: Popular Prakashan, 1972.
- (with K. M. Kapadia) Industrialization and rural society: a study of Atul-Bulsar region. Bombay: Popular Prakashan, 1972.
- 'A Note on the Joint Family', Sociologische Gids, No. 6 (Nov-Dec 1974)
- 'Pattern of Family among the Dhodiyas of Bulsar Region', in Dhirendra Narain (ed.) Explorations in the Family and other Essays: Essays in Memory of K. M. Kapadia, Bombay: Thackers, 1975.
- 'Gujaratis', in Family of Man, Marshall-Cavendish Encyclopaedia, Vol. 3, Part 38, London, 1975.
- (ed.) Aspects of changing India: studies in honour of Prof. G.S. Ghurye. Bombay: Popular Prakashan, 1976.
- Rajahs and prajas: an Indian princely state, then and now. Bombay: Popular Prakashan, 1976.
- (ed.) The Incredible elections, 1977: a blow-by-blow document as reported in the Indian express. Bombay: Popular Prakashan, 1977.
- (ed. with Chris Baks) Winners and losers: styles of development and change in an Indian region. Bombay: Popular Prakashan, 1979.
- Indian sociology through Ghurye: a dictionary. Mumbai : Popular Prakashan, 1997.
- Sociology Through Literature: a study of Kaaroor's stories. New York: Routledge, 2019.
