= Rana Lakha =

Maharana of Mewar from 1382 to 1421

Rana Lakha Singh
- Rana
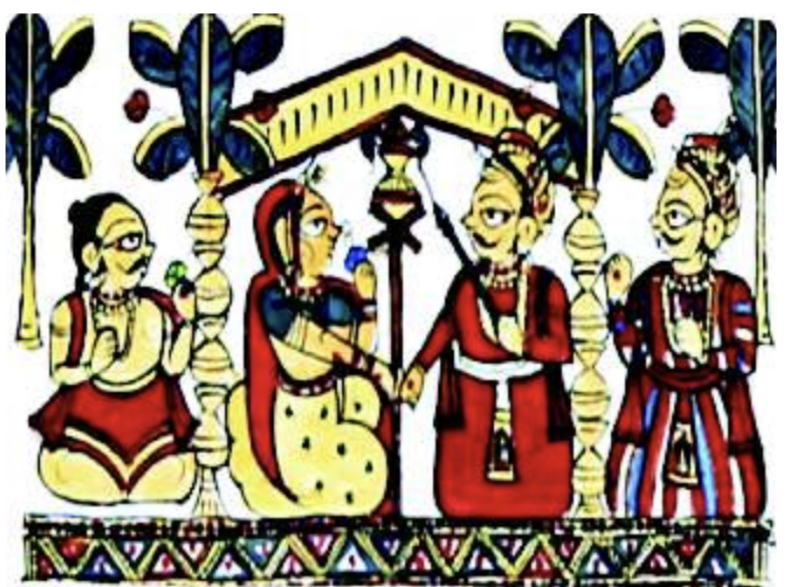

Rana of Mewar
- Reign: 1382–1421
- Predecessor: Rana Kshetra Singh
- Successor: Rana Mokal Singh
- Died: 1421
- Spouse: Khichanji (Chauhanji) Lakham Deiji of Gagron; Chauhanji Pyar Deiji; Bhatiyaniji Raj Deiji of Jaisalmer; Rathorji Hansa Bai/Deiji of Marwar; Devadiji (Chauhanji) of Sirohi
- Issue: Chunda Sisodia; Raghodas; Ajaiji (Ajoji); Dulehji (Dulhoji); Udaiji (Udoji); Bhimji (Bhinvji); Dungarji (Dungroji); Mokal Singh
- Dynasty: Sisodias of Mewar
- Father: Kshetra Singh
- Mother: Solankiniji Ram Deiji

Rana Lakha (r. 1382–1421) was a Sisodia Rajput ruler of Mewar Kingdom in medieval India. He was the son of Rana Kshetra Singh and ruled Mewar from 1382 until his death in 1421.

Lakha was married several times and had at least eight sons. His youngest son Mokal Singh by his wife Hansa Bai of Marwar succeeded him as the fourth Rana in the year 1421. During his reign, Lakha took the remaining former territories of Mewar from Delhi Sultanate. His eldest son Chunda took oath to safeguard his motherland against all external powers who were trying to overpower their kingdom in exchange for his father's marriage to his fiancé Hans Deiji, the Rathore Rajput princess of Marwar. After having some misunderstanding with queen mother Hans Deiji and Rao Ranmal (brother of the queen mother) Yuvraj Chunda left his kingdom's capital abode Chittorgarh Fort and went to Begu near Chittorgarh and settled there. The progeny of Chunda are known as Chundawat Sisodias the first and the chief most sub-clan of the Sisodia house of Mewar

== Rule ==
Rana Lakha Singh was one of the most successful Maharana's. He extended his dominions by the subjugation of Marwar and the destruction of its chief stronghold, Berahtgarh, on the ruins of which he founded Badnore. It was in this time that the tins and silver Mines of Jawar were also discovered in the country conquered from the bhils by his father. Rana Lakha raided as far as Gaya in Bihar and put an end to pilgrimage tax there. With the revenues thus augmented he rebuilt the palaces and temples destroyed by Alauddin Khilji, excavated reservoirs and lakes, raised immense ramparts to dam their waters, and constructed a number of forts. He conquered the Sankhla Rajputs of Shekhawati (Nagarchal territory) and like his father, he defeated the imperial army of Delhi led by Sultan Firoz Shah Tughlaq at Badnor.

Preceded by Kheta	Ruler of the Mewar Kingdom; 1382–1421	Succeeded by Mokal
