= Mokal Singh =

Maharana of Mewar from 1421 to 1433

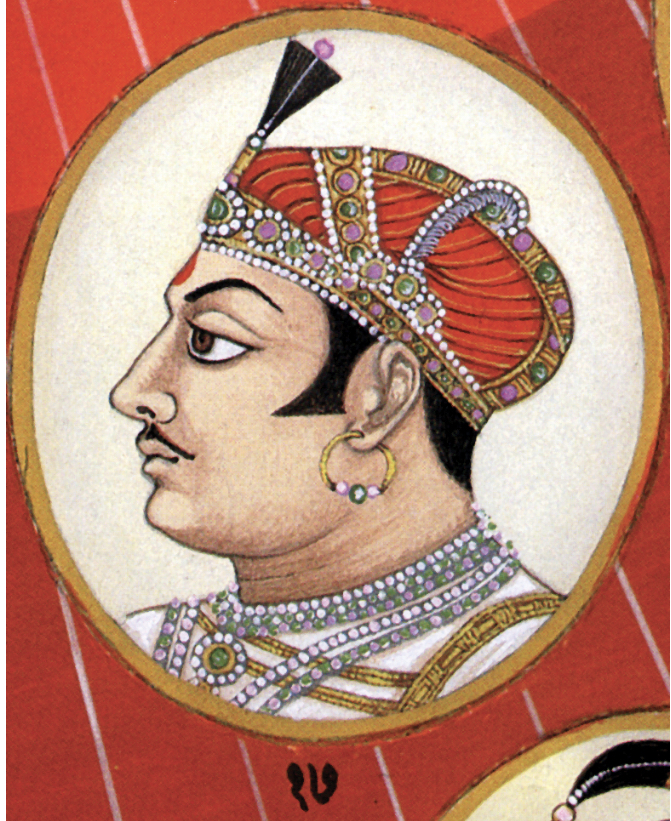

Maharana of Mewar
- Reign: 1421–1433
- Predecessor: Lakha Singh
- Successor: Rana Kumbha
- Born: 1409
- Died: 1433 (aged 23–24)
- Spouse: Rani Saubhag Devi
- Issue: Maharana Kumbha Rani Sisodni (wife of Rao Jodha) Kshemkaran Shiv Sutta/Sakta Nath Viramdev Kunwar Rajdhar Rani Lal Kunwar Bai
- House: Sisodia Rajput
- Dynasty: Sisodias of Mewar
- Father: Lakha Singh
- Mother: Hansa Bai
- Religion: Hinduism

Mokal or Mokal Singh (1409–1433), was the Maharana of Mewar Kingdom in medieval India. Henry Soszynski dates his reign to r. 1421–1433, and his lifespan to c. 1409 – c. 1433. S. Devadas Pillai dates his reign to 1397–1433.

He was a son of Maharana Lakha Singh. Maharana Mokal has been described as a great builder, a trait which he had inherited from his father. He created various buildings along with completing those commenced by his father Lakha. Among the monuments he built was the Temple of Brahma in Chittorgarh.

== Background ==
Mokal was a younger son of Lakha Singh and was born of his wife Hansa bai, a princess of Mandore. His mother was not originally betrothed to his father, but rather to Lakha's eldest son Prince Chunda Sisodia. When the delegation from Mandore had arrived in Chittor to officialise the betrothal, Chunda was away from court. The ageing Lakha jested with the delegation, remarking that the proposal was obviously not meant for a "greybeard" like him. When Chunda later learned of the comment, the proud prince refused the marriage, for he could not accept a proposal which his father, though in jest, had publicly declined. The old Maharana, failing to change his son's mind and fearful of offending Hansa Bai's powerful family, was forced to marry the princess himself. In return, Chunda was required to give up his position as heir to the throne in favour of the eldest son born by Hansa Bai.

== Reign ==
Maharana Lakha, the 4th Maharana of Mewar died in war, leaving young Mokal as his successor. Being a minor, his eldest brother Chunda Sisodia began to look after the state of affairs as promised to Rana Lakha. But Mokal's mother Hansa Bai disapproved of the influence that Chunda had over the nobles of Mewar. She questioned his integrity and doubted his intentions. Her resentment made Chunda leave Chittor and retire to Mandu, capital of Malwa. Rani Hansa Bai attained help from her brother Ranmal to administer the state of affairs on behalf of Mokal until he reached his majority.

Maharana Mokal had a brief stint as the ruler of Mewar, but rose to fame as the most celebrated warrior of his race. He defeated Nagour, Gujarat, and repelled an invasion by the Delhi Sultanate (Sayyid dynasty). But most importantly, he completed palaces that were commenced by his father Maharana Lakha and conspired to build more aesthetic structures. His assassination by his paternal uncles, Chacha and Mera, in 1433 brought an end to a great Maharana in the making at the young age of 24.

Rana Kumbha who was only 13 years old at the time of Mokal's death, ascended the throne at a crucial juncture in the history of Mewar. The young Kumbha may have had the most unfavourable situation after his father's untimely death, but the valour and vision of his father, Maharana Mokal, inspired him to emerge as one of Mewar's greatest rulers.

Mokal Singh Sisodia Rajput Clan Born: 1409 Died: 1433
Preceded by Rana Lakha	Rajput Ruler of Mewar; 1421–1433	Succeeded by Rana Kumbha
