= Kshetra Singh =

Rana of Mewar from 1364 to 1382

Rana Kshetra Singh
- Maharana

Maharana of Mewar
- Reign: c. 1364 – c. 1382
- Predecessor: Hammir Singh
- Successor: Lakha Singh
- Died: 1382
- Spouse: Devadiji Pyar Deiji of Sirohi Hadiji Krishna Deiji of Bundi Solankiniji Ram Deiji
- Issue: Lakha Singh; Viramdev; Salkhaji; Shikharji; Kunwarsi; Nandoji; Visalji; Parvatji; Bhakarji; Saluji
- Dynasty: Sisodias of Mewar
- Father: Hammir Singh
- Mother: Songariji (Chauhanji) Bal Deiji d.of Rao Maldev of Jalore

Rana Kshetra Singh (r. 1364–1382), was a Sisodia Rajput ruler of Mewar Kingdom. He was the eldest son of his father and predecessor Rana Hammir Singh, the progenitor of Sisodias. In his reign, he conquered the territories of Ajmer and Mandalgarh.

== Reign ==
Kshetra Singh, reigned from 1364 to 1382, was the son and successor of the celebrated Rana Hammir Singh. Rana Kshetra Singh greatly expanded the Kingdom of Mewar. He captured Ajmer and Jahazpur, re-annexed Mandalgarh, Mandsaur and the whole of Chappan into Mewar. He achieved a victory over the Sultan of Delhi, who was utterly defeated at Bakrole. The Kumbalgarh inscription says that in a battle he captured Zafar Khan, governor of Patan (who later became the first independent Sultan of Gujarat). Kshetra Singh further increased his popularity by defeating the Sultan of Malwa and killing his general, Amir Shah.

Kshetra Singh died in 1382 during a campaign against the Hada of Bundi. After his death, Lakha Singh (1382-1421) ascended the throne of Mewar.

Preceded by Hamir	Ruler of the Mewar Kingdom; 1364- 1382	Succeeded by Lakha
