= Singoli =

- Tehsil
- Location in Madhya Pradesh, India Singoli (India)
- Coordinates: 24.97°N 75.3°E
- Country: India
- State: Madhya Pradesh
- District: Neemuch
- Elevation: 363 m (1,191 ft)

Population (2001)
  - Total: 8,307

Languages
  - Official: Hindi
- Time zone: UTC+5:30 (IST)
- PIN: 458228
- Telephone code: 917420
- ISO 3166 code: IN-MP
- Vehicle registration: MP-44

Singoli is a block and a nagar panchayat in Neemuch district in the Indian state of Madhya Pradesh.

== Geography ==
Singoli is located at 24.97°N 75.3°E. It has an average elevation of 363 metres (1,190 feet). Singoli is located at the border of Madhya Pradesh and Rajasthan.

== History ==
The town is historically significant for the Battle of Singoli (1336), in which Rana Hammir Singh of Mewar defeated the forces of the Delhi Sultanate (Muhammad bin Tughlaq). Following this victory, the strategic fort was granted as a Thikana (feudal estate) to the Rajput commanders of the campaign. The descendants of these chieftains adopted the toponymic title 'Singholi' to signify their guardianship of the estate.

== Demographics ==
As of 2001 India census, Singoli had a population of 8,307 but now it is more than that this figure. Males constitute 51% of the population and females 49%. Singoli has an average literacy rate of 65%, higher than the national average of 59.5%: male literacy is 76%, and female literacy is 53%. In Singoli, 15% of the population is under 6 years of age.

== Education ==
Singoli has two higher secondary schools in Hindi named Government Boys and Girls High Secondary School and Saraswati shishu mandir respectively.
