= Chunda Sisodia =

Rajput prince

- Regent of Mewar under Mokal Singh.
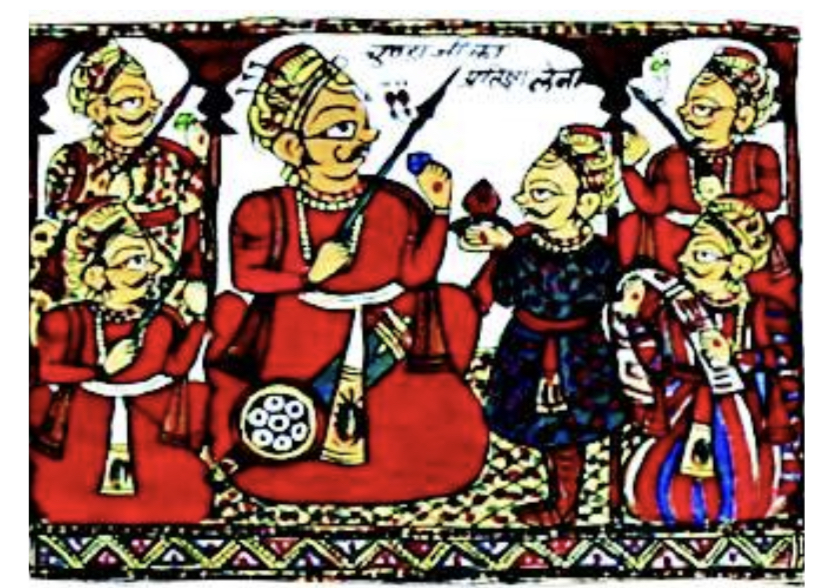

Progenitor of Chundawat Rajputs
- Predecessor: Position established
- Successor: Rawat Khandal
- Spouses: Rani Balecha Chauhanji Navrang De; Rani Sindhal Rathoriji Ladu Kanwar; Rani Rathoriji Roop Kanwar; Rani Chauhaniji Parvat Kanwar; Rani Hada Chauhaniji Kalu Kanwar; Rani Deora Chauhaniji Keshar Kanwar
- Issue: Rawat Khandhal; Thakur Kuntal; Thakur Tej; Jait Singh; Manja Singh; Suwaa Singh; Thakur Aasaa; Rasaa Singh; Thakur Randhir; Jaimal Chundawat; Padam Kunwar; Bhim Singh; Dev Chundawat; Sawaldas Chundawat; Ishardas Chundawat
Names
- Kunwar Chunda Singh Sisodia
- House: Sisodia
- Father: Lakha Singh
- Mother: Khichi Lakhma Deiji

Chunda was the eldest son of Rana Lakha, the ruler of Mewar. He is known in history for his sacrifice of his rights to the throne, to keep his promise. He was the heir-apparent until he renounced his right in favour of the heir born from Hansa Bai, the Rathore princess who was married to Maharana Lakha.

== Early life ==
Chunda, was the eldest out of eight issues of Rana Lakha. Ranmal Rathore, the eldest son of Rao Chunda of Marwar was discontented with his fate in Mandore, as his father made Kanha as the heir apparent. He arrived in Mewar, where Rana Lakha granted him the jagir of Dhanla. Ranmal sent a marriage proposal of his sister Hansa Bai to the heir apparent of Mewar, but when the proposal arrived in the court, Rana Lakha jested with the delegation, remarking the proposal was obviously not for him. Chunda, who was on a mission then, was absent from the court. On his return, Chunda learned of the whole event, he rejected the offer. To avoid making an issue by declining the proposal, it was proposed to Ranmal that he should marry his sister to Rana Lakha. To this, Ranmal made an objection saying Rana Lakha already had an heir to the throne, so if it is promised that Hansa Bai's child would be the heir then he would accept this proposal. Chunda made this promise and after the birth of Mokal, Chunda kept his promise and renounced the throne of Mewar. Chunda was granted the right of state administration.

== Later life ==
After the death of Rana Lakha, Mokal became the Rana of Mewar. Chunda managed the state administration, but queen mother Hansa Bai suspected that there could be foul play by Chunda, so Chunda left the court of Mewar and moved to Mandu. But he gave his younger brother Raghavdev the responsibility to look after Mokal and keep an eye on the influence of Rathores under Ranmal, over the state administration of Mewar. With Chunda gone to Mandu, Ranmal consolidated the power. The grandson of Hansa Bai and Lakha Singh, Rana Kumbha ascended the throne after Mokal was killed by Chacha and Mera. Raghavdev was assassinated by Ranmal. With the increasing influence of Ranmal over Mewar State administration, there was discontent among people. Chunda was called back and soon after Ranmal was killed. Chunda then captured Mandore from Rathores. Chunda then served his nephew Rana Kumbha for the remainder of his life.

The ruins of Chunda's house are near the Kalika Mata Temple in Chittorgarh Fort.

Chunda's descendants are known as Chundawat, who held the hereditary role of managing the State administration, while Maharana ruled. Chundawats had the right to ratify any decision made by Maharana by signing a mark of the spear on every official document. Chundawat Chief of Salumbar, being the eldest branch of Chundawat held this role in the State of Mewar.

== Personal life ==
Chunda had six wives. He firstly married Rani Balecha Chauhaniji Navrang De, daughter of Hemji, married secondly, Rani Sindhal Rathoriji Ladu Kanwar, daughter of Rao Panchayanji and grand daughter of Rawal Kikaji, married thirdly, Rani Rathoriji Roop Kanwar, daughter of Thakur Ran Singhji, married fourthly, Rani Chauhaniji Parvat Kanwar, daughter of Rao Dungar Singh, married fiftthly, Rani Hada Chauhaniji Kalu Kanwar, daughter of Rao Balji and lastly married Rani Deora Chauhaniji Keshar Kanwar, daughter of Rao Surtan Singh. He had 14 sons and one daughter. His eldest son, Rawat Khandhal succeeded him as Rawat of Salumber.
