= Mandore =

- town
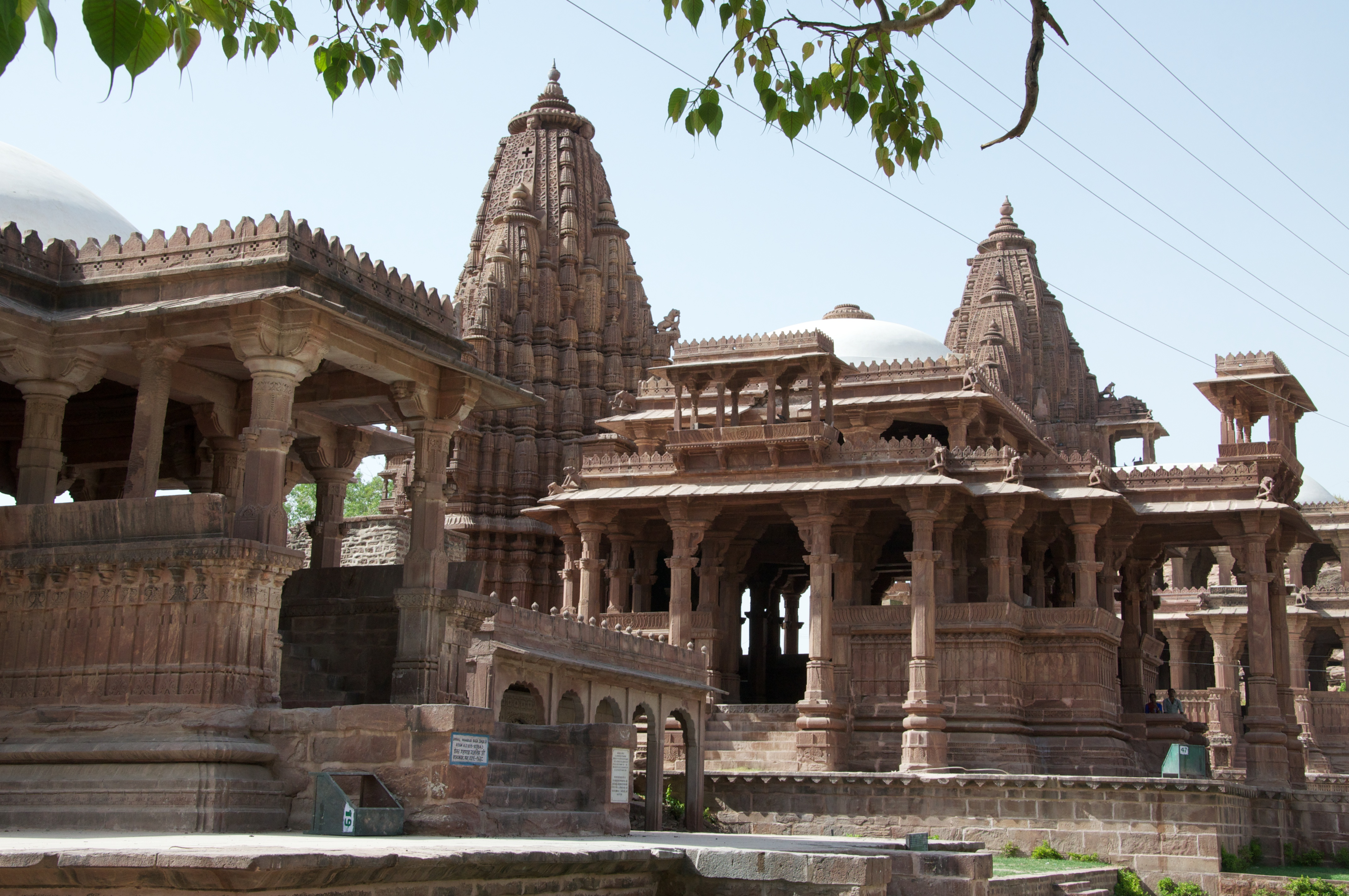
- Temples in Mandore (Jodhpur district, Rajasthan)

- Location in Rajasthan, India Mandore (India)
- Coordinates: 26.3535°N 73.0331°E
- Country: India
- State: Rajasthan
- District: Jodhpur
- Named for: Mandodari

Languages
  - Official: Marwari (Rajasthani)(Regional), Hindi
- Time zone: UTC+5:30 (IST)
- Postal code: 342005
- Nearest city: Jodhpur
- Lok Sabha constituency: Jodhpur
- Vidhan Sabha constituency: Sardarpura

Mandore is a suburb and historical town located 9 km north of Jodhpur city in the Jodhpur district of the north-western Indian state of Rajasthan.

== History ==
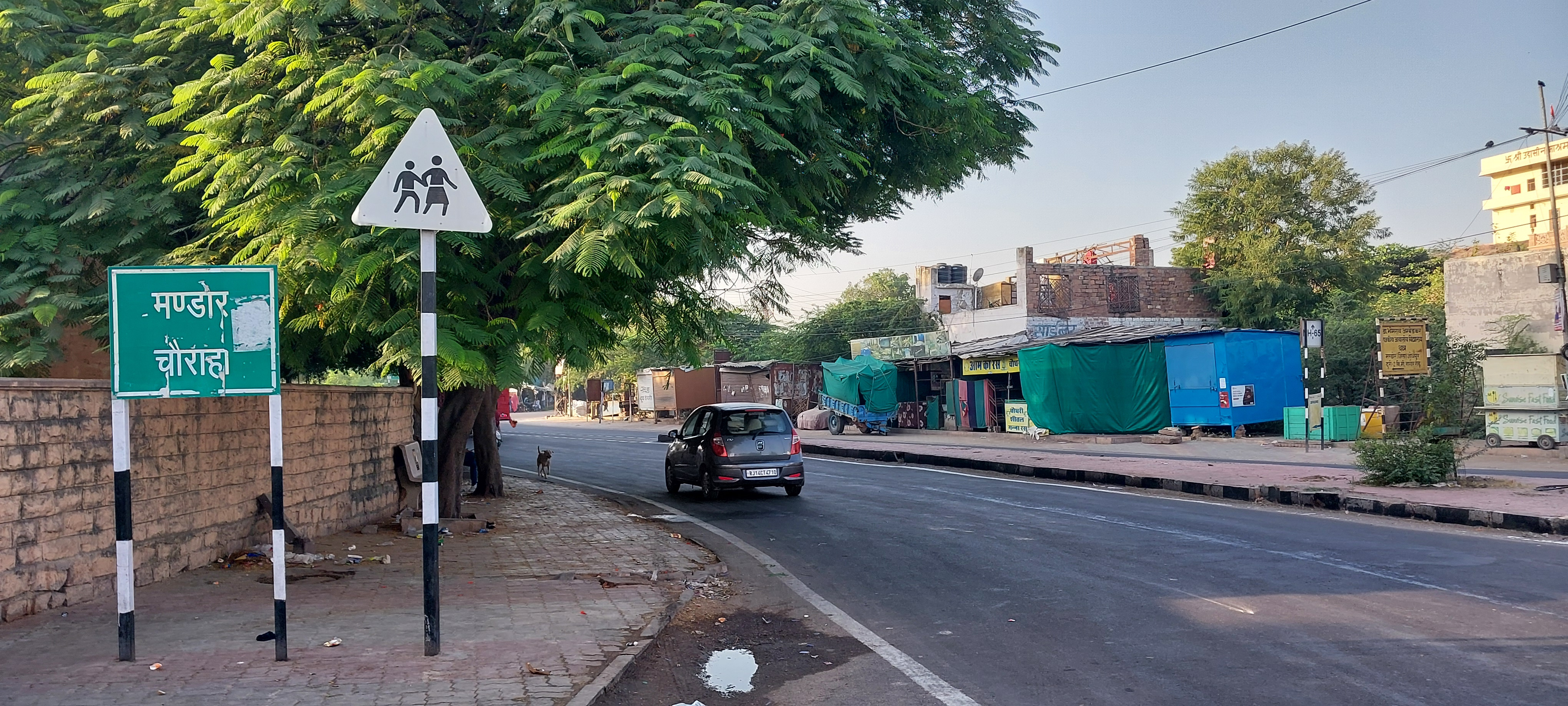
Mandore city crossing

Mandore is an ancient town, and was the seat of the Pratiharas of Mandavyapura, who ruled the region in the 6th century CE. Even after the disintegration of the Gurjara-Pratihara empire, a Pratihara family continued to rule at Mandore. This family formed an alliance with the Rathore chief Rao Chunda (r. c. 1383-1424) to defend its chiefdom against the Tughluq dynasty of the Delhi Sultanate. Rao Chunda married a Pratihara princess of Mandore, and received the Mandore Fort in dowry; the Fort served as his family's capital until 1459 CE, when Rao Jodha shifted it to the newly-founded city of Jodhpur.

Rao Ranmal Rathore secured the throne of Mandore in 1427. In addition to ruling Mandore, Ranmal also became the administrator of Mewar to assist Maharana Mokal (father of Rana Kumbha). After the assassination of Maharana Mokal in 1433, Ranmal continued as administrator of Mewar at the side of Rana Kumbha. In 1438, Rana Kumbha decided to end the power sharing arrangement and had Rao Ranmal assassinated in Chittor and captured Mandore. Rao Jodha, son of Rao Ranmal, escaped towards Marwar. Approximately 700 horsemen accompanied Rao Jodha as he escaped from Chittor. Fighting near Chittor and a valiant attempt to bar the pursuers at Someshwar Pass resulted in heavy losses amongst Jodha's warriors. When Jodha reached Mandore he had only seven people accompanying him. Jodha collected whatever forces he could, abandoned Mandore and pressed on towards Jangalu. Jodha barely managed to reach safety at Kahuni (a village near present day Bikaner). For 15 years Jodha tried in vain to recapture Mandore. Jodha's opportunity to strike finally came in 1453 with Rana Kumbha facing simultaneous attacks by the Sultans of Malwa and Gujarat. Jodha made a surprise attack on Mandore. Jodha's forces overwhelmed the defenders and captured Mandore with relative ease. Jodha and Kumbha eventually settled their differences in order to face their common enemies, the Muslim rulers of Malwa and Gujarat.

Mandore was the capital of the erstwhile princely state of Marwar (Jodhpur State), before Rao Jodha moved it to Jodhpur, where he built Mehrangarh.

Mandore remained as royal cremation grounds, where Devals of all the Kings of Marwar till Maharaja Takht Singh were built. From Maharaja Jaswant Singh-II onwards, Jaswant Thada became the royal cremation ground.

== Monuments ==
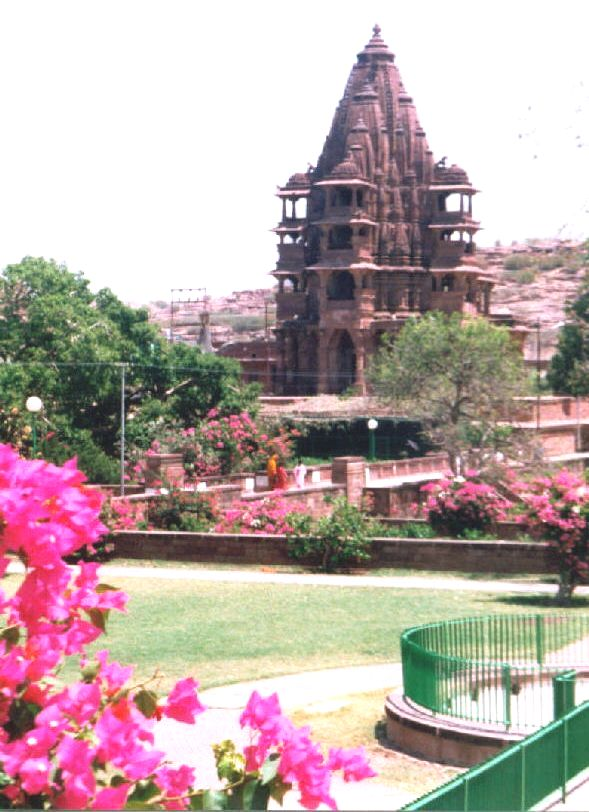
The Royal Cenotaph (Deval) At Mandore Garden, Photo by Dr. Chetan Singh Parihar

The historic town boasts several monuments. The now ruined Mandore fort, with its thick walls and substantial size, was built in several stages and was once a fine piece of architecture. A huge, now ruined, temple is a highlight of the fort. The outer wall of the temple depicts finely carved botanical designs, birds, animals and planets. The fort has been adopted by Mehrangarh Museum Trust under "adopt a heritage" scheme of Indian government for preservation and conservation. The Government Museum located in Janana Mahal of Mandore garden was established in year 1968 by the Architecture and Museum department of the Rajasthan state government, to conserve and showcase the rich architectural and zoological heritage of Marwar.

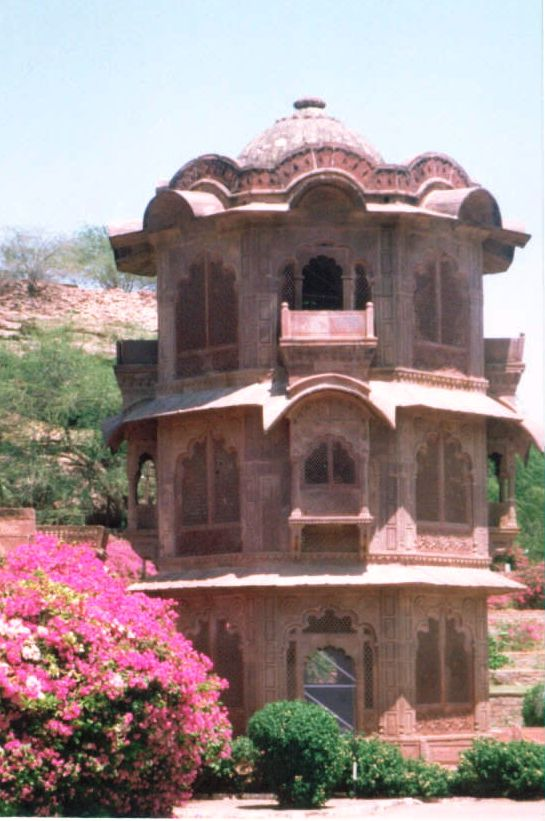
The Ek Thamba Mahal At Mandore Garden, Photo by Dr. Chetan Singh Parihar

The 'Mandore gardens', with its charming collection of temples and memorials, and its high rock terraces, is another major attraction. The gardens house the Chhatris (cenotaphs) of many rulers of Jodhpur state. Prominent among them is the chhatri of Maharaja Ajit Singh, built in 1793.

Ravan temple is another attraction at Mandore. It is believed to be the native place of Ravan's wife Mandodari. Ravan is treated as son in law among some local Brahmins.

The Mandore Gardens also house a government museum, a 'Hall of Heroes' and a Hindu temple to 33 crore gods. Various artefacts and statues found in the area are housed at the museum. The 'Hall of Heroes' commemorates popular folk heroes of the region. It contains 16 figures carved out of a single rock.

== Fairs and festivals ==
- Raoji Ki Ger
- Naga Panchami
- Veerpuri Mela
- Bhogishail Parikrama

== See also ==
- Rajput clans
- Jodhpur State
