= List of battles in Rajasthan =

Wars and battles involving ancient Rajputana

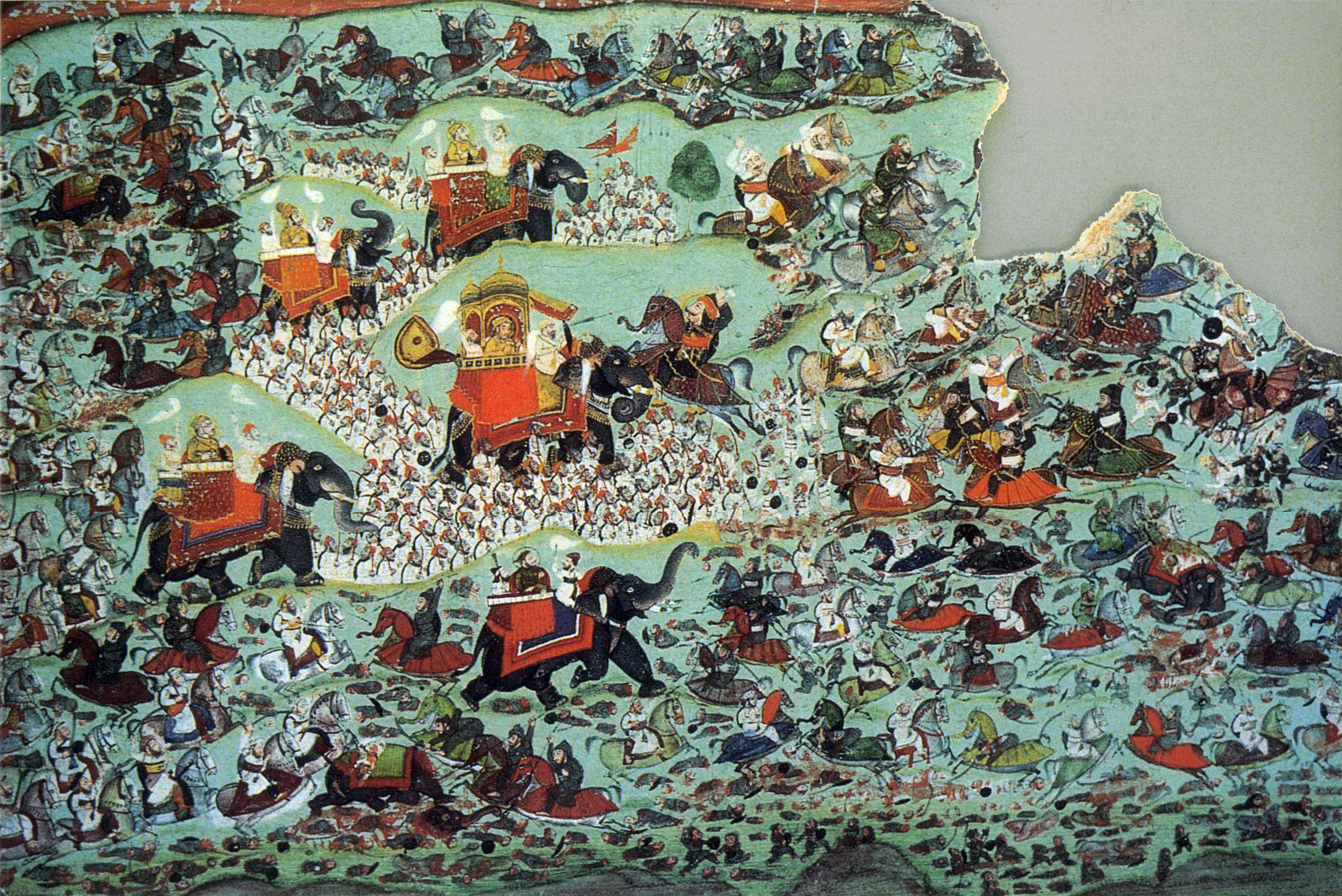
Battle of Haldighati, fought between Mughals and Maharana Pratap.

Several significant battles took place in what is now Rajasthan, India.

Outcome colour key
Victory for the Rajasthan-based force	Victory for the opposing force	Unclear or mixed outcome

== 8-9th century ==
Date	Conflict	Location	Combatant 1	Combatant 2	Outcome
711–740 CE	Umayyad campaigns in India (711–740 CE)	Rajasthan and surrounding regions (exact battlefield locations uncertain)	Gurjara-Pratihara and Mewar	Umayyad Caliphate	Gurjara-Pratihara–Mewar victory An alliance of rulers under the pratihara King Nagabhata I defeated the Arabs in 711 CE, in alliance with Kingdom of Mewar, King Bappa Rawal, and forced them to retreat to Sindh.
800–836 CE	Arab Invasion of Rajputana (800–836 CE)	Rajputana (exact battlefield locations uncertain)	Gurjara-Pratihara, Mewar, and Rajput allies	Arab forces from Sindh	Gurjara-Pratihara–Mewar victory An alliance of local rulers under Nagbhata II of Gurjara Pratihara Dynasty and Rawal Khoman II of Mewar successfully repulsed an Invasion of Arabs under Bashar, the governor of Sindh, Govindraj Chauhan and other Rajput leaders of Kannauj, Punjab, Gujarat, and Delhi also played a major role in the battle.
—	Umayyad Invasion of Rajasthan	Chittor region (exact battlefield uncertain)	Guhila Rajputs of Chittor	Arab forces	The Guhila Rajputs were feudatories of the Moriya (Mori) Rajputs of Chitor and they came into prominence in the time of Khummaņa I popularly known as Bappā Rāwal who was the 9th ruler in the family of Guhadatta. He started his political career as a vassal of the Mori monarch Manurāja and probably led the Mori forces against the Arabs. In this expedition, Bappā Rāwal achieved complete victory.

== 11th century ==
Date	Conflict	Location	Combatant 1	Combatant 2	Outcome
1071	Kachwaha invasion of Dhundhar (1071)	Dhundhar, Rajasthan	Kachhwaha dynasty	Bargujar Rajputs and Meena clans	Kachhwaha victory Dulha Rai of Kachhwaha dynasty led an army from Gwalior, he defeated the Bargujars and Meenas and conquered Dhundhar from them.
—	Conquest of Khoh	Khoh, Rajasthan	Kachhwaha dynasty	Chanda Meenas	Kachhwaha victory Dulha Rai defeated the Chanda Meenas and took Khoh, making it his capital.
—	Conquest of Amber	Amber, Rajasthan	Kachhwaha dynasty	Susawat Meenas	Kachhwaha victory Kakil defeated the Susawat Meenas under Rao Bhatto and took control of Amber.

== 12th century ==
Date	Conflict	Location	Combatant 1	Combatant 2	Outcome
circa. 1135-1150 CE	Battle of Ajmer (circa. 1135-1150 CE)	Ajmer, Rajasthan	Chahamanas of Shakambhari	Ghaznavid Empire	Chauhan victory Rajput forces under Arnoraja Chauhan defeated invading forces of the Seljuk Empire under Ghaznavid King Bahram Shah.
circa. 1150-1164 CE	Battle of Khetri (circa. 1150-1164 CE)	Khetri, Rajasthan	Chahamanas of Shakambhari	Ghaznavid Empire	Chauhan victory Forces of the Ghazanvid Empire under Khusrau Shah of Ghazna defeated by Chauhan dynasty under Vigraharaja IV. This decisive victory not only marked the successful defense of the region but also resulted in the annexation of Hansi (Asika) into the Chahamana territory.
1178	Battle of Kasahrada (1178)	Kayandra, Sirohi district, Rajasthan	Chaulukya dynasty and allies	Ghurid Empire	Chaulukya victory Mularaja II of Chaulukya dynasty defeated Muhammad of Ghor.
1196	Siege of Bayana (1196)	Bayana, Rajasthan	Jadaun Rajputs	Ghurid Empire	Ghurid victory Muhammad of Ghor besieged Bayana, then capital of the Jadaun Rajputs, whose ruler Kumarpala was defeated and the territory passed under Muhammad of Ghor who placed it under his senior slave Bahauddin Tughril.
1197	Battle of Kasahrada (1197)	Kayandra, Sirohi district, Rajasthan	Rajput confederation	Ghurid Empire	Ghurid victory Qutb al-Din Aibak, a slave-commander of Muhammad of Ghor defeated Chaulukya king Bhima II
1196	Battle of Ajmer (1196)	Ajmer, Rajasthan	Rajput–Mer confederacy	Ghurid Empire	Rajput–Mer victory Qutubuddin Aibak invaded Rajasthan but he was defeated by confederacy of Hindu Rajputs and Mer in 1196 CE.

== 13th century ==
Date	Conflict	Location	Combatant 1	Combatant 2	Outcome
1211	Siege of Jalore (1211)	Jalore, Rajasthan	Chahamanas of Jalore	Delhi Sultanate	Jalore victory Iltutmish was repulsed by Udayasimha of Jalore in 1211 CE.
1226	Siege of Ranthambore (1226)	Ranthambore, Rajasthan	Chahamanas of Ranastambhapura	Delhi Sultanate	Delhi Sultanate victory Iltutmish captured the Ranthambore fort in 1226 CE.
1227	Siege of Mandore (1227)	Mandore, Rajasthan	Chahamanas of Jalore	Delhi Sultanate	Iltutmish captured Mandore but it was soon recaptured by Rajputs in 1227 CE.
1236	Siege of Ranthambore (1236)	Ranthambore, Rajasthan	Chahamanas of Ranastambhapura	Delhi Sultanate	Chauhan victory Vagbhata Chauhan recaptured Ranthambore during the reign of the Delhi ruler Razia.
1248	Siege of Ranthambore (1248)	Ranthambore, Rajasthan	Chahamanas of Ranastambhapura	Delhi Sultanate	Chauhan victory Vagabhata Chauhan successfully defended the fort against Nasiruddin Mahmud.
1253	Siege of Ranthambore (1253)	Ranthambore, Rajasthan	Chahamanas of Ranastambhapura	Delhi Sultanate	Chauhan victory Vagbhata Chauhan repelled another invasion from the Mamluks.
1253–54	Invasion of Mewar (1253–54)	Mewar, Rajasthan	Guhila kingdom of Mewar	Delhi Sultanate	Rawal Tejasimha fought series of battle against Balban.
1255	Invasion of Mewar (1255)	Mewar, Rajasthan	Guhila kingdom of Mewar	Delhi Sultanate	Rawal Tejasimha who gave refuge to Qutlug Khan who revolted against Sultan of Delhi repelled another invasion from Balban.
1259	Siege of Ranthambore (1259)	Ranthambore, Rajasthan	Chahamanas of Ranastambhapura	Delhi Sultanate	Delhi Sultanate victory Nasiruddin Mahmud captured Ranthambore from Jetra Singh Chauhan.
1283	Siege of Ranthambore (1283)	Ranthambore, Rajasthan	Chahamanas of Ranastambhapura	Delhi Sultanate	Chauhan victory Shakti Dev Chauhan recaptured Ranthambore from the Mamluks.
1290	Battle of Ranthambore (1290)	Ranthambore, Rajasthan	Chahamanas of Ranastambhapura	Delhi Sultanate	Chauhan victory Jalaluddin Firuz Khalji attacked Hammir Dev because of his rising power. Jalaludin's forces were defeated by Hammir.
1291	Siege of Jalore (1291)	Jalore, Rajasthan	Chahamanas of Jalore	Delhi Sultanate	Jalore victory Jalaluddin Firuz Khalji attacked Jalore but he was forced to retreat by Vaghela ruler of Gujarat Sarangadeva in 1291 CE.
1294–1295	Siege of Jaisalmer (1294–1295)	Jaisalmer, Rajasthan	Bhati rulers of Jaisalmer	Delhi Sultanate	Khalji victory Alauddin Khalji commanded the Khilji army under Jalaluddin Firuz Khalji and plundered Jaisalmer after a siege that lasted for a year. For some years afterwards Jaisalmer remained abandoned before the surviving Rajputs reoccupied it.
1300	Battle of Banas (1300)	Banas–Ranthambore area, Rajasthan	Chahamanas of Ranastambhapura	Delhi Sultanate	Chauhan victory Alauddin Khalji sent his younger brother Ulugh Khan to Invaded Ranthambore but he was defeated by Hammiradeva generals Bhimasimha and Dharmasimha in 1300 CE.

== 14th century ==
Date	Conflict	Location	Combatant 1	Combatant 2	Outcome
1301	Siege of Ranthambore (1301)	Ranthambore, Rajasthan	Chahamanas of Ranastambhapura	Delhi Sultanate	Hammiradeva defeated Alauddin Khalji's generals Ulugh Khan and Nusrat Khan; later, Alauddin defeated Hamira Dev.
1303	Siege of Chittor (1303)	Chittor, Rajasthan	Kingdom of Mewar	Delhi Sultanate	Khalji victory Alauddin Khalji defeated Rawal Ratan Singh.
1305	Siege of Jalore (1305)	Jalore, Rajasthan	Chahamanas of Jalore	Delhi Sultanate	Jalore victory Kanhadadeva defeated Delhi army and killed general Shaheen.
1305	Battle of Siwana (1305)	Siwana, Rajasthan	Siwana fort garrison	Delhi Sultanate	Siwana victory Sitaldeva Commander of Siwana fort defeated and killed Alauddin Khalji Generals Nahar Malik and Kandadhara Bhoja.
1308	Siege of Siwana (1308)	Siwana, Rajasthan	Siwana fort garrison under Sheetal Deo	Delhi Sultanate	Khalji victory Malik Kamaluddin a general of Alauddin Khalji defeated Sheetal Deo.
1310	Siege of Jalore (1310)	Jalore, Rajasthan	Chahamanas of Jalore	Delhi Sultanate	Jalore victory Kanhad Dev repulsed Alauddin Khalji General Shama Khan
1310–11	Battle of Jalore (1310–11)	Jalore, Rajasthan	Chahamanas of Jalore	Delhi Sultanate	Khalji victory Alauddin Khalji defeated Kanhad Dev after a long and bloody war it was a pyrrhic victory.
1321	Battle of Chittor (1321)	Chittor, Rajasthan	Kingdom of Mewar	Maldev Songara's forces (Tughlaq vassals)	Mewar victory Rana Hammir Singh defeated Maldev Songara, a vassal of the Tughlaq dynasty and recovered Mewar.
1336	Battle of Singoli (1336)	Singoli, Mandsaur district, Madhya Pradesh	Kingdom of Mewar	Delhi Sultanate	Mewar victory Rana Hammir Singh defeated and imprisoned Muhammad bin Tughluq and annexed Ajmer, Ranthambhore Fort, Nagaur and Shivapuri.
1374	Battle of Mallani (1374)	Malani, Rajasthan	Rathores of Mallani with Tughlaq support	Tribhuvanshi forces	Rathore victory Rawal Mallinath Rathore with the help of Firoz Shah Tughlaq Defeated Tribhuvanshi
1378	Battle of Mallani (1378)	Malani, Rajasthan	Rathores of Mallani	Forces of Nizamuddin of Malwa and Firoz Shah Tughlaq	Rathore victory Rawal Mallinath Rathore defeated thirteen division of Mohamadan army of Nijjamudin of Malwa and Firoz Shah Tughlaq.
1394	Battle of Mandore (1394)	Mandore, Rajasthan	Rathores of Mallani under Rao Chunda	Muslim forces holding Mandore	Rathore victory Rawal Mallinath Rathore sent a contingent under his nephew Rao Chunda to annex Mandore. Rao Chunda defeated Muslim force and annexed Mandore.
1396	Battle of Mandore (1396)	Mandore, Rajasthan	Rathores of Mandore	Tughlaq army	Rathore victory Rao Chunda Rathore successfully defended Mandore against a Tughlaq army and captured Sambhar, Didwana, Khatu and Ajmer from them.
1399	Battle of Nagaur (1399)	Nagaur, Rajasthan	Rathores of Mandore	Jalal Khan Khokhar's forces	Rathore victory Rao Chunda Rathore defeated Jalal Khan Khokhar of Nagaur and annexed Nagaur
1399	Battle of Mallani (1399)	Malani, Rajasthan	Mahecha rulers of Mallani	Gujarat Sultanate	Kunwar Jagmal Singh Mahecha Rawal of Malani defeated Hathi Khan general of Gujarat Sultan Mahmud Begada and married Muslim princess Gindoli.

== 15th century ==
Date	Conflict	Location	Combatant 1	Combatant 2	Outcome
1415	Battle of Badnore (1415)	Badnor, Rajasthan	Kingdom of Mewar	Delhi Sultanate	Mewar victory Rana Lakha defeated sultan of Delhi at Badnore and further took the war to Gaya in Bihar and got exemption from the pilgrimage tax imposed on the Hindus for their visit there.
1421	Battle of Mandore (1421)	Nagaur, Rajasthan	Rathores of Mandore	Forces of Firoz Khan	Rathore victory Rao Chunda Re-captured Nagaur from Firozkhan.
1434	Battle of Sirohi (1434)	Sirohi, Rajasthan	Rathores under Rao Ranmal	Deora rulers of Sirohi	Rathore victory Rao Ranmal defeated Rao Sahasmal Deora and captured Basantgarh, Bhula and areas of Abu.
1435–1436	Siege of Mandalgarh (1435–1436)	Mandalgarh, Rajasthan	Rathores under Rao Ranmal	Hada rulers of Mandalgarh	Rathore victory Rao Ranmal Rathore captured Mandalgarh fort from Rao Bairisal Hada.
1436	Battle of Jahazpur (1436)	Jahazpur, Rajasthan	Kingdom of Mewar	Hada rulers of Bundi	Mewar victory Rana Kumbha defeated Hadas of Bundi At Jahazpur
1437	Conquest of Eastern Sirohi State (1437)	Eastern Sirohi State, Rajasthan	Kingdom of Mewar	Sirohi State	Mewar victory Rana Kumbha Marched Against Sirohi State Captured Parganas of Ajahari, Pindwara from Sirohi Ruler Sahasmal
1437wf	Battle of Sarangpur (1437)	Sarangpur, Madhya Pradesh	Mewar and Rathores	Malwa Sultanate	Mewar–Rathore victory Rana Kumbha supported by Rao Ranmal Rathore defeated and imprisoned Mahmud Khalji.To commemorate this victory, Rana Kumbha built the Vijay Stambha (Tower of Victory) in the fortress of Chittor.
1437	Capture of Ajmer (1437)	Ajmer, Rajasthan	Kingdom of Mewar	Nagaur Sultanate	Mewar victory Rana Kumbha Captured Ajmer From Nagaur Sultan Firoz Khan
1442–1446	Battle of Mandalgarh and Banas (1442–1446)	Mandalgarh and Banas region, Rajasthan	Kingdom of Mewar	Malwa Sultanate	A series of battles that took place between Mahmud Khalji of Malwa and Rana Kumbha of Mewar. Bloodied by these engagements the Sultan did not attack Mewar for another ten years.
1444	Siege of Gagron (1444)	Gagron, Rajasthan	Gagron State with Mewar reinforcements	Malwa Sultanate	Sultan Mahmud besieged Gagron fort which belonged to Palhan Singh Khichi. Rana Kumbha had sent reinforcements under his commander Dahir, but Dahir died in battle and Palhan was killed by bhils while fleeing from the fort.
1454	Siege of Mandore (1454)	Mandore, Rajasthan	Rathores of Marwar	Kingdom of Mewar	Marwar victory Rao Jodha Rathore recaptured Mandore from Rana Kumbha.
1455	Battle of Abu (1455)	Mount Abu, Rajasthan	Kingdom of Mewar	Gujarat Sultanate	Mewar victory Qutbuddin sent Imadul Mulk to invade Mewar through Abu, but Imadul suffered heavy losses against the Mewari soldiers posted on the hills and was immediately called back.
1456	Battle of Nagaur (1456)	Nagaur, Rajasthan	Kingdom of Mewar	Nagaur and Gujarat Sultanate	Mewar victory Rana Kumbha defeated the combined armies of Shams Khan (sultan of Nagaur) and Qutbuddin (Sultan of Gujarat) and captured Nagaur, Kasili, Khandela and shakambhari.
1456	Battle of Mandalgarh (1456)	Mandalgarh, Rajasthan	Kingdom of Mewar	Malwa Sultanate	Mewar victory Sultan Mahmud attacked Mandalgarh, he sent seven detachments to attack the Rana Kumbha from multiple directions. The Malwa forces under Taj Khan and Ali Khan suffered heavy losses in battle against Rana Kumbha after which Mahmud retreated the next morning.
1456–57	Siege of Mandalgarh (1456–57)	Mandalgarh, Rajasthan	Kingdom of Mewar	Malwa Sultanate	Malwa Sultanate victory In December Rana Kumbha was forced to move north to confront the sultan of Gujarat, Sultan Mahmud once again attacked Mandalgarh and captured it after a siege. Fort was later recaptured by the Rajputs .
1458–1459	Siege of Kumbhalgarh (1458–1459)	Kumbhalgarh, Rajasthan	Kingdom of Mewar	Malwa Sultanate	Mewar victory Sultan Mahmud besieged Kumbhalgarh fort but finding the fort too strong he retreated back to Mandu.
1466	Siege of Nagaur (1466)	Nagaur, Rajasthan	Rathores of Marwar	Nagaur Sultanate	Marwar victory Rao Jodha defeated Fatankhan of Nagaur. Fatankhan was forced to flee to Jhunjhunu.
1467	Battle of Mandalgarh (1467)	Mandalgarh, Rajasthan	Kingdom of Mewar	Malwa Sultanate	Mewar victory Sultan Mahmud invaded Mewar and fought a battle with Rana Kumbha, but retreated after defeated & taking heavy losses.
1473	Battle of Mandalgarh (1473)	Mandalgarh, Rajasthan	Kingdom of Mewar	Malwa Sultanate	Mewar victory After failed invasion of Chittor Sultan of Malwa then marched up to capture Mandalgarh but again was defeated by Rana Raimal. After defeating the Sultan of Malwa, the Rajput army chased them up to Khairabad and later it was sacked and Plundered from which Rajputs extracted heavy fines from the Sultan of Malwa.
1474	Battle of Chappar-Dronpur (1474)	Chappar-Dronpur, Rajasthan	Rathores of Marwar	Jaunpur Sultanate	Marwar victory Rao Jodha defeated Bahlol Khan and Hussian Shah of Jaunpur Sultanat.
1475	Siege of Chittorgarh (1475)	Chittor, Rajasthan	Kingdom of Mewar	Malwa Sultanate	Mewar victory After the death of Udai Singh I The sultan of Mandu helped Surajmal and Shahasmal. He started with a large army to assist Surajmal and Shashasmal to the throne of Mewar and arrived near Chittor. Rana Raimal issued from the fortress and attacked Ghiyath Shah who being utterly defeated, fled to Mandu.
1485	Conquest of Jangladesh (1485)	Jangladesh, Rajasthan	Rathores of Bikaner	Jat clans of Jangladesh	Bikaner victory Rao Bika invaded Jangladesh which was in the control of Jat settlements. Bika led an army of 300 Rajput warriors and subjugated all of the Jat clans of northern Rajasthan.
1486	Battle of Sambhar (1486)	Sambhar, Rajasthan	Rathores of Marwar	Kachhwahas of Amber	Marwar victory Rao Jodha Rathore Defeated invading army of Raja chandrasen of Amber
1486	Battle of Shiv (1486)	Shiv, Rajasthan	Rathores of Marwar	Bhati rulers of Jaisalmer	Marwar victory Rao Jodha Rathore Defeated Rawal Devidas of Jaisalmer and re-occupied Shiv
1488	Battle of Bikaner (1488)	Bikaner, Rajasthan	Rathores of Bikaner	Lodi Sultanate	Bikaner victory Bahlol Lodi sent an expedition against Rao Bika under Sarang Khan the governor of Hissar but the Muslim army was Defeated and Sarang Khan was killed
1492	Battle of Peepar (1492)	Peepar, Rajasthan	Rathores of Marwar	Afghan forces under Gudhla Khan	Marwar victory Rao Satal Rathore defeated Gudhla Khan, an Afghan general and rescued 140 Maidens that had been captured. Rao Satal himself died that night of the wounds received in the battle.
1495	Capture of Ajmer (1495)	Ajmer, Rajasthan	Kingdom of Mewar	Afghan garrison of Ajmer	Mewar victory Prithviraj Sisodia defeated afgans at Taragarh fort and slayed afgan Governor Mallu Khan

== 16th century ==
Date	Conflict	Location	Combatant 1	Combatant 2	Outcome
1513	Battle of Bikaner (1513)	Bikaner, Rajasthan	Rathores of Bikaner	Nagaur Sultanate	Bikaner victory Muhammad Khan of Nagaur invaded Rathor kingdom of Bikaner but was defeated by Lunkaran Rathore.
1513	Battle of Jaisalmer ( 1513 )	Jaisalmer, Rajasthan	Bhati rulers of Jaisalmer	Forces under Rawal Jaitsi	Bhati victory Rawal Jaitsi was defeated by Jograj Singh Bhati 'kunda'.
1518	Battle of Khatoli (1518)	Khatoli, Rajasthan	Kingdom of Mewar	Lodi Sultanate	Mewar victory Rana Sanga defeated Ibrahim Lodhi.
1519	Battle of Dholpur (1519)	Dholpur, Rajasthan	Kingdom of Mewar	Lodi Sultanate	Mewar victory Rana Sanga defeated Ibrahim Lodhi second time.
1519	Battle of Gagron (1519)	Gagron, Rajasthan	Kingdom of Mewar	Malwa Sultanate	Mewar victory Rana Sanga defeated Mahmud Khalji of Malwa.
1520	Rana Sanga conquest of Gujarat (1520)	Idar and northern Gujarat	Mewar-led Rajput coalition	Gujarat Sultanate	In 1520 Rana Sanga led a coalition of Rajput armies to invade Gujarat. He reinstated Raimal as the Rao of Idar and defeated the Gujarat Sultanate forces under the command of Nizam Khan. Rana Sanga drove the army of Muzaffar II deep into Gujarat and chased them up to Ahmedabad. The Sultan of Gujarat was forced to flee to Muhammadabad.
1520	Siege of Mandsaur (1520)	Mandsaur, Madhya Pradesh	Kingdom of Mewar	Gujarat Sultanate	Mewar victory Sultan Muzaffar Shah II sent an army under Malik Ayaz but failed and retreated to Gujarat.
1529	Battle of Sevaki (1529)	Sevaki, Rajasthan	Rathores of Marwar	Nagaur forces	Marwar victory Rao Ganga and Rao Jaitsi defeated Shekha and Daulat Khan of Nagaur.
1533	Battle of Hirabadi (1533)	Hirabadi, Rajasthan	Rathores of Marwar	Nagaur forces	Marwar victory Rao Maldeo defeated Daulat Khan of Nagaur. Daulat Khan was forced to flee to Ajmer
1537	Siege of Jaisalmer (1537)	Jaisalmer, Rajasthan	Rathores of Marwar	Bhati rulers of Jaisalmer	Rao Maldeo besieged Jaisalmer. Rawal Lunkaran sued for peace.
1544	Battle of Sammel (1544)	Giri-Sumel, Rajasthan	Rathores of Marwar	Sur Empire	Afghan victory against Rao Maldeo force led by Rao Jaita and Rao Kumpa Marwar kingdom.
1545	Battle of Jodhpur (1545)	Jodhpur, Rajasthan	Rathores of Marwar	Afghan garrison	Marwar victory Rao Maldeo Rathore defeated the Afghan garrison in Marwar and reoccupied his lost territories .

== 16th century ==
Date	Conflict	Location	Combatant 1	Combatant 2	Outcome
1527	Battle of Bayana (1527)	Bayana, Rajasthan	Mewar-led Rajput coalition	Mughal Empire	Mewar victory Mughal advance guard was defeated by Rana Sanga.
1527	Battle of Khanwa (1527)	Khanwa, Rajasthan	Mewar-led Rajput coalition	Mughal Empire	Mughal victory Babur defeated Rana Sanga.
1534	Siege of Bikaner (1534)	Bikaner, Rajasthan	Rathores of Bikaner	Mughal force under Kamran Mirza	Bikaner victory Rao Jaitsi Rathore defeated Mughal force under Kamran brother of emperor Humayun.
1557	Battle of Harmada (1557)	Harmada, Rajasthan	Rathores of Marwar	Kingdom of Mewar	Marwar victory Rao Maldeo Rathore defeated Udai Singh II and captured Merta.
1559	Battle of Ajmer (1559)	Ajmer, Rajasthan	Rathores of Marwar	Mughal Empire	Mughal victory Akbar's general Qasim Khan annexed Ajmer from Maldeo Rathore.
1562	Battle of Merta (1562)	Merta, Rajasthan	Rathores of Marwar	Mughal Empire, with Bikaner and Amber forces	Mughal victory Akbar with the help of ruler of Bikaner and Amer defeated Rao Chandra Sen Rathore and captured Merta.
1562	Battle of Lohawat (1562)	Lohawat, Rajasthan	Forces under Rao Chandra Sen	Forces under Udai Singh of Marwar	Marwar victory Rao Chandra Sen defeated Udai Singh.
1563	Battle of Nadol (1563)	Nadol, Rajasthan	Forces under Rao Chandra Sen	Forces under Ramchandra Rathore	Mewar victory Rao Chandra Sen defeated Ramchandra Rathore. Ramchandra fled to Nagaur.
1562–1583	First Mughal Invasion of Marwar (1562–1583)	Marwar, Rajasthan	Rathores of Marwar	Mughal Empire	Akbar invaded Marwar and occupied Jodhpur. The ruler Rao Chandra Sen continued his struggle until his death in 1581 after which Marwar submitted to Mughal rule in 1583.
1567	Battle of Mandalgarh (1567)	Mandalgarh, Rajasthan	Mandalgarh fort garrison	Mughal Empire	Akbar advanced by Dholpur route taking the forts of Sivapura and Kota, he dispatched a Mughal army under Asaf khan to take surrounding forts. Mandalgarh was the first to be attacked but Asaf khan was repulsed by the faithful commander Ballu Sinhji, a Solanki Rajput. Later Asaf khan and Wazir khan conquered Mandalgarh by defeating the Solanki contingent of the fort.
1567–1568	Siege of Chittorgarh (1567)	Chittor, Rajasthan	Kingdom of Mewar	Mughal Empire	Mughal victory Akbar defeated Rao Jaimal and Patta Sisodia (Rana Udai Singh II and the entire royal family were forcefully sent out of the fort by the feudal lords to continue the struggle.)
1568	Siege of Ranthambore (1568)	Ranthambore, Rajasthan	Hada rulers of Bundi	Mughal Empire	Mughal victory A successful siege by Akbar causes the Rajput leader Rao Surjan Hada to surrender Ranthambore Fort.
1572	Siege of Siwana (1572)	Siwana, Rajasthan	Rathore defenders of Siwana	Mughal Empire	Mughal victory Mughal force under General Udai Singh Rathore defeated Kalyanmal Singh Rathore and Kalyandas Rathore and annexed powerful fort of Siwana which served as Rao Chandra Sen's capital was captured by the Mughals after a siege of 8 months.
1576	Battle of Haldighati (1576)	Khamnor (Haldighati), Rajsamand district, Rajasthan	Mewar Kingdom	Mughal Empire	Battle between Man Singh I and Pratap Singh I.
1577	Battle of Mohi (1577)	Mohi, Rajasthan	Kingdom of Mewar	Mughal Empire	Mewar victory When the imperial commanders were establishing order in the rebel areas Akbar in order to personally supervise the reduction of the Rana's power personally left Ajmer for Gogunda on 11 October 1576 A. D. Then the emperor moved further in the north-easterly direction and put Majahad Beg, Ghazi Khan Badakhshi, Sarif Khan Atka etc., with 3,000 horsemen at Mohi(near Nathdwara). Here he remained for some time. But when the protecting armies of Man Singh and his colleagues had withdrawn from the neighbourhood, Pratap's soldiers fell upon him and Majahad Beg was killed in the skirmish that followed. Mohi was taken by the Rajputs in September, 1577, and the Emperor made no attempt to re-occupy the place for some time.
1582	Battle of Dewair (1582)	Dewair, Rajasthan	Kingdom of Mewar	Mughal Empire	Mewar victory Maharana Pratap fought against Mughal governor of Dewair Sultan Khan and defeated him and 36 Mughal posts were dissolved.
1583	Battle of Dattani (1583)	Dattani, Sirohi district, Rajasthan	Sirohi State under Rao Surtan Deora	Mughal Empire	Sirohi victory Rao Surtan Deora Chauhan of Sirohi defeated Mughal force.
1583	Siege of Kumbhalgarh (1583)	Kumbhalgarh, Rajasthan	Kingdom of Mewar	Mughal Empire	Mewar victory Maharana Pratap recaptured Kumbhalgarh fort from Mughals.
1599	Siege of Ontala (1599)	Ontala, Rajasthan	Kingdom of Mewar	Mughal Empire	Mewar victory Rana Amar Singh defeated and killed Mughal general Kayum Khan to capture Ontala fort.
—	Prince Salim's Invasion of Mewar	Mewar, Rajasthan	Kingdom of Mewar	Mughal Empire	Prince Salim, later known as Emperor Jahangir, along with Raja Man Singh, led an invasion of the kingdom of Mewar and successfully defeated Amar Singh. Following the defeat, Amar Singh fled into the hills and a significant portion of Mewar was annexed to the Mughal Empire. This included territories such as Mohi, Ontala, Bagore, and Mandal, which became part of the Mughal dominion.

== 17th century ==
Date	Conflict	Location	Combatant 1	Combatant 2	Outcome
1606	Battle of Dewair (1606)	Dewair, Rajasthan	Kingdom of Mewar	Mughal Empire	Mewar victory Fought in a valley 40 km from Kumbalgarh. Rana Amar Singh won and the Mughal prince Muhammad Parviz fled from the battlefield with his commander Asaf Khan III.
1611	Battle of Ranakpur (1611)	Ranakpur, Rajasthan	Kingdom of Mewar	Mughal Empire	Mewar victory Rana Amar Singh won mughal forces under Abdullah Khan rendering his Mewar expedition.
1679–1707	Rajput War (1679–1707)	Rajputana	Rajput states of Mewar and Marwar	Mughal Empire	also known as Rathore Rebellion – Emperor Aurangzeb took Marwar under his direct control after the death of Maharaja Jaswant Singh. The Rathore army under Durgadas Rathore carried out a relentless struggle against the occupying forces. In 1707 after the death of Aurangzeb,Durgadas defeated the local Mughal force and reoccupied Jodhpur and their lost territories by.
1680	Battle of Udaipur (1680)	Udaipur, Rajasthan	Kingdom of Mewar	Mughal Empire	Aurangzeb attacked Mewar and plundered Udaipur, the citizens were safely escorted to Panarwa a hilly region by Rana Raj Singh but 63 temples in and around Udaipur were plundered and many villages were burned down by Aurangzeb's general Taj Khan. The Mughal army was eventually starved because of the scorched earth techniques and guerrilla warfare used by the Rana. Aurangzeb after a failed campaign left Mewar to his son Akbar and retreated to Ajmer. during that time naruji barhath a charan warrior fought bravely to protect jagdish mandir from Aurangzeb army. he was martyred while fighting to mughal army Naruji Barhat and his 22 Charan warriors defending the Jagdish Temple against the Mughal forces in 1680.
1680	Battle of Aravalli hills (1680)	Aravalli Range, Rajasthan	Kingdom of Mewar	Mughal Empire	In the second half of 1680, after several months of such setbacks, Aurangzeb decided on an all-out offensive. Niccolao Manucci, an Italian gunner in the Mughal army, says: "for this campaign, Aurangzeb put in pledge the whole of his kingdom." Three separate armies, under Aurangzeb's sons Akbar, Azam and Muazzam, penetrated the Aravalli hills from different directions. However, their artillery lost its effectiveness while being dragged around the rugged hills and the Prince Akbar rebelled against Aurangzeb . Aurangzeb later complied to the demands of Rana Raj Singh and Mewar was left alone.
1681–1687	Battle of Khanana (1681–1687)	Khanana, Rajasthan	Rathore rebels of Marwar	Mughal Empire	Rathore victory Rathore rebels under Veer Durgadas Rathore defeated Mughal force. This battle resulted in major victory for Rathores. Kumpawats captured Siwana town from Mughals. Mughal commander Purdil Khan was killed in this battle.
1690	Battle of Ajmer (1690)	Ajmer, Rajasthan	Rathores under Durgadas	Mughal forces under Safi Khan	Rathore victory Durgadas Rathore defeated Safi Khan.

== 18th century ==
Date	Conflict	Location	Combatant 1	Combatant 2	Outcome
1707	Battle of Jodhpur (1707)	Jodhpur, Rajasthan	Rathores of Marwar	Mughal garrison of Jodhpur	Rathore victory Durgadas Rathore took advantage of the disturbances following the death of Aurangzeb in 1707 to seize Jodhpur and eventually evict the occupying Mughal force out of Marwar.
1708	Annexation of Amer (1708)	Amer, Rajasthan	Kachhwahas of Amber	Mughal Empire	Mughal victory Bahadur Shah I marched with a large army and annexed Amer without a war. Raja Sawai Jai Singh was forced to retreat with his army. Amber was named 'Mominabad' by the Mughal emperor.
1708	Battle of Merta (1708)	Merta, Rajasthan	Rathores of Marwar	Mughal Empire	Mughal victory Bahadur Shah I's general Mihrab Khan defeated Ajit Singh of Marwar. The Mughal emperor was advised to stay in Ajmer as the Mughals were wary of the guerrilla tactics of Veer Durgadas. Ajit Singh however went against the advice of Durgadas Rathore and directly confronted the large Mughal army. The Mughals bombarded the Rathor horsemen with cannons and rockets and forced them to retreat after heavy losses. Jodhpur was once again occupied by the Mughals. Jodhpur was named Mohjamabhad by the Mugal emperor.
1708-1710	Rajput Rebellion 1708-1710	Rajputana	Amber, Mewar, and Marwar	Mughal Empire	Rajput victory The three Rajput Raja's Kacchwaha of Amber,Sishodiya of Udaipur and Rathore of Jodhpur made a joint resistance to the Mughals. The Rajputs first expelled the commandants of Jodhpur and Bayana and recovered Amer by an attack. They next killed Sayyid Hussain Khan Barha in the "Battle of Sambhar (1709)". Ajit Singh also attacked Ajmer and forced its governor to pay tribute. Sayyid Hidayatullah, the governor of Ranthambor was also defeated, bringing a danger to the Mughal capital itself. Bahadur Shah I, then in the Deccan was forced to patch up a truce with the Rajput Rajas (1710).
1708	Siege of Jodhpur and Jaipur (1708)	Jodhpur and Jaipur, Rajasthan	Jaipur and Marwar	Mughal garrisons	Jaipur–Marwar victory Jai Singh and Ajit Singh storm Amber and Jodhpur and retake their capitals from the Mughal garrisons.
1708	Battle of Sambhar (1708)	Sambhar, Rajasthan	Rathore–Kachhwaha army	Mughal Empire	Rathore–Kachhwaha victory Sayyid Hussain Barha of Mewat defeated near Sambhar by the Rathore-Kachwaha army. Barha shot dead with his two brothers.
1710	Battle of Javli (1710)	Javli, Rajasthan	Naruka forces	Mughal and Jat forces	Naruka victory Mir Khan of Narnaul with 7000 Mughal troops and Churaman Jat with 6000 Jats effectively checked by Gaj Singh Naruka at Javli.
24 March 1710	Battle of Tonk (24 March 1710)	Tonk, Rajasthan	Rathore–Kachhwaha army	Forces of Muhammad Khan of Tonk	Rathore–Kachhwaha victory Muhammad Khan of Tonk defeated by the Rathore-Kachwaha army.
1708	Battle of Kama (1708) (4–7 October 1708)	Kama, Rajasthan	Kachhwaha forces of Kama	Mughal and Jat forces	Kachhwaha victory Ajit Singh Rajawat kachwaha, the zamindar of Kama defeated combined armies of Mughals and Jats. The Mughal-Jat army numbered 18,000 while the Kachwahas had 10,000 horsemen. After a bitter fight the Mughal faujdar Raza Bahadur was killed and the injured Jat leader Churaman was forced to retreat to Thun.
1711	Battle of Bandanwara (1711)	Bandanwara, Rajasthan	Kingdom of Mewar	Mughal Empire	Mewar victory Maharana Sangram Singh - II defeated Mughal force under Mir Bakshi and Zulfikar Khan.
1718–1722	Jai Singh II's campaign against the Jats (1718–1722)	Jat strongholds in eastern Rajasthan	Jaipur with allied forces	Jat forces	Farrukhsiyar sent Raja Jai Singh of Jaipur. The Mughal Emperor had no choice but to send Jai Singh II of Amber against the Rajput. Badan Singh joined Jai Singh prepared an army of 14,000 men and marched towards the Jat strongholds. Muhkam Singh attacked Jai Singh's army at night several times leading to heavy losses on both sides. Badan Singh who was with the army of Rajah Jai Singh pointed out the weak spots and helped in the reduction of two fortified outworks. After conducting the defence for about two months, Muhkam fled to Jodhpur where he paid the Jodhpur Maharaja Ajit Singh three lakh rupees to help him against Jai Singh. A Jodhpur army was sent under Bijairaj Bhandari to save Thoon, however by the time the Jodhpur army reached Jobner, it was too late as most of the Jat strongholds had fallen and many smaller forts had been dismantled. Muhkam had no choice but to go into exile, a Mughal army was sent to chase him, however he was saved by the Maharaja of Jodhpur. Badan Singh was thus made the Thakur of Bharatpur by Jai Singh.
1741	Battle of Gangwana (1741)	Gangwana, Rajasthan	Rathores of Marwar	Mughal, Kachhwaha, and allied forces	10,000 Rathore cavaliers of Bhakt Singh fought a combined army of a 24000 men consisting of Mughals, Kachwahas and. Sir Jadunath Sarkar quotes that - "the battle front was like tigers upon a flock of sheep". According to Harcharandas more than 12,000 men were slain in the battlefield.
1747	Battle of Rajmahal (1747)	Rajmahal, Rajasthan	Jaipur	Kingdom of Mewar and allied forces	Jaipur victory Ishwari Singh of Jaipur defeated a coalition of armies led by Jagat Singh of Mewar.
1748	Battle of Bagru (1748)	Bagru, Rajasthan	Forces under Madho Singh I	Jaipur under Ishwari Singh	Madho Singh victory Madho Singh I defeated Ishwari Singh.
1750	Battle of Raona (1750)	Raona, Rajasthan	Marwar and Jaipur	Mughal Empire	Marwar–Jaipur victory The Mughal Empire invaded Marwar but were repelled by the armies of Ram Singh and Ishwari Singh.
1750	Battle of Luniawas (1750)	Luniawas, Rajasthan	Forces under Bakht Singh of Marwar	Forces under Ram Singh of Marwar	Bakht Singh victory Bhakt Singh challenged his nephew Ram Singh for the throne of Marwar. Ram Singh hired a large contingent of Afghan and Baloch Musketeers from Sindh to defeat his uncle, he further formed a powerful army in Jodhpur and appointed Sher Singh Rathore, a veteran general of Marwar to defeat the usurper. At first Ram Singhs general Sher Singh Rathore pushed Bhakt Singh 4 miles back and almost forced him to retreat, 2000 Rathores of Bhakt Singh fell in the battle with 9 Rathor nobles and Bhakt Singh was severely injured by spear and bullet wounds, but Bhakt Singh made a fierce counterattack which killed Sher Singh and most of Ram Singhs commanders making the battle a costly victory for Bhakt Singh.
1752	Battle of Ajmer (1752)	Ajmer, Rajasthan	Forces under Bakht Singh of Marwar	Maratha Empire and forces under Ram Singh	Marwar victory In May 1752 Jayappaji Rao Scindia and Ram Singh I attacked Ajmer, sacked it and massacred the populace. Upon learning of the invasion, Bhakt Singh marched with his army and camped 8 miles away from Ajmer. He waited till July and then attacked Jayappa. Bhakt Singh blocked the surrounding paths and placed his guns on a hill, he then bombarded the Marathas, upon receiving heavy casualties, the Marathas fled along with the army of Ram Singh.
1754	Battle of Kumher (1754)	Kumher, Rajasthan	Bharatpur State	Maratha, Mughal, and Jaipur forces	Bharatpur victory Suraj Mal Jat ruler of Bharatpur defeated combind army of Marathas, Mughals and Jaipur.
1756	Capture of Alwar Fort (1756)	Alwar, Rajasthan	Bharatpur State	Jaipur	Bharatpur victory Madho Singh of Jaipur had occupied Alwar Fort by paying Rupees 50 thousand as bribe to its custodian and sending 500 men. When Suraj Mal heard of it, he despatched a strong force of 5,000 under Rup Ram Katari and the siege of the fort was taken up. Soon after Jawahar Singh also joined him. In the ensuing fight there, the Jats easily gained the day and thus wrested the fort from the Rajputs (c. 23 March 1756). The Jaipur ruler, though visibly mortified by the reverse, held back as he felt himself powerless in ejecting the Jats.
1757	Siege of Barwara and Tonk Forts (1757)	Barwara and Tonk, Rajasthan	Maratha Empire	Jaipur	Raghunath Rao and Malhar Rao Holkar laid siege on the forts of Barwara and Tonk against Madho Singh I. It resulted in Stalemate.
1759	Battle of Kakkor (1759)	Kakkor, Rajasthan	Jaipur	Maratha Empire	Maratha victory Malhar rao Holkar crushed the forces of Jaipur who were 4000 in number and killed their 21 captains.
1761	Battle of Mangrol (1761)	Mangrol, Rajasthan	Jaipur	Maratha Empire and Kota forces	Madho Singh of Jaipur fought Malhar Rao Holkar. The Jaipur army had 10,000 men while the Holkar army had 6,000 men from Indore and 3,000 men supplied by the Rao of Kota. After a 2-day battle the Jaipur army was completely destroyed. However Malhar Rao was not able to plunder Dhundhar for long as he was recalled to Bundelkhand because of rebellions and threats of invasion by Shuja-Ud-Daula of Awadh.
1765	Siege of Ranthambore (1765)	Ranthambore, Rajasthan	Naruka forces of Macheri	Maratha Empire	Naruka victory Pratap Singh of Macheri defeated Marathas after a long siege
1767	Battle of Maonda and Mandholi (1767)	Maonda and Mandholi, Rajasthan	Jaipur	Bharatpur State	Jaipur victory Jaipur forces defeat the forces of Bharatpur.
1768	Battle of Kama (1768)	Kama, Rajasthan	Jaipur	Bharatpur State	Jaipur victory Madho Singh I invaded Bharatpur at the head of 16,000 men where he defeated jat leader Jawahar Singh again on 29 February 1768.
1775	Battle of Mandan (1775)	Mandan, Rajasthan	Shekhawat chiefs of Shekhawati	Mughal forces	Shekhawati victory The Shekhawats defeated a Mughal force under Mitrasen Ahir, Peero Khan and Kale Khan. After heavy losses on both sides, Peero Khan died and Mitra Sen fled.
1775	Conquest of Alwar (1775)	Alwar, Rajasthan	Naruka forces under Pratap Singh	Jat garrison of Alwar	Naruka victory Pratap Singh Naruka took the possession of the Alwar fort by bribing the Jat garrison, whose pay had long been in arrears.
1779	Battle of Khatu Shyamji (1779)	Khatu Shyamji, Rajasthan	Kachhwaha/Shekhawat forces	Mughal imperial army	Chood Singh Nathawat of Doongri and Dalel Singh Khangarot of Sewa defeated the imperial army under Murtaza Khan Bhadech, Najaf Khan and Abdullah Khan.Battle of Khatu
1787	Battle of Tunga or Battle of Lalsot (1787)	Lalsot, Rajasthan	Jaipur and Marwar	Maratha Empire	Jaipur–Marwar victory Combined forces of Jaipur and Jodhpur defeated Maratha forces led by Mahadji Shinde.
1790	Battle of Patan (1790)	Patan, Rajasthan	Jaipur	Maratha Empire	Maratha victory The Battle of Patan was fought on 20 June 1790 between the Scindias(then Shindes) of Gwalior and the Kachwahas of Jaipur, and resulted decisive victory of Maratha forces.
1790	Battle of Merta (1790)	Merta, Rajasthan	Rathores of Marwar	Maratha Empire	Maratha victory Maratha army of Mahadaji Shinde under De Boigne defeated the army of Vijay Singh.
1799	Battle of Fatehpur (1799)	Fatehpur, Rajasthan	Jaipur	Maratha forces of Gwalior and forces under George Thomas	Jaipur victory The Battle was fought in March 1799 between the Maratha Kingdom of Gwalior supported by General George Thomas and the Kingdom of Jaipur under Pratap Singh of Jaipur which resulted in a decisive Jaipur victory.

== 19th century ==
Date	Conflict	Location	Combatant 1	Combatant 2	Outcome
1804	Siege of Deeg (1804)	Deeg, Rajasthan	Bharatpur State and Maratha Empire	East India Company	East India Company victory Jats under Ranjit Singh and Marathas under Yashwantrao Holkar defeated by East India Company.
1805	Siege of Bharatpur (1805)	Bharatpur, Rajasthan	Bharatpur State and Maratha Empire	East India Company	Bharatpur–Maratha victory Jats and Marathas defeated East India Company
1806	Siege of Mehrangarh (1806)	Mehrangarh, Jodhpur, Rajasthan	Rathores of Marwar	Jaipur, Mewar, and Bikaner forces	Man Singh of Marwar defeated the armies of Jaipur, Mewar and Bikaner. So comprehensively that Jagat Singh of Jaipur had to pay a sum of Rs. 2,00,000 to secure his safe passage. In honour of Man Singhs victory over Jaipur the Jai Pol, or victory gate was built in the fort in 1808.
1825–1826	Siege of Bharatpur (1825–26)	Bharatpur, Rajasthan	Bharatpur State	East India Company	East India Company victory East India Company defeated Bharatpur State
8 September 1857	Battle of Bithoda (8 September 1857)	Bithoda, Rajasthan	Auwa rebels and allied Rajputs	Jodhpur loyalist levies	Auwa rebel victory Kushal Singh Champawat, a noble of Jodhpur joined the Indian Rebellion of 1857 against the British Empire, around 5,000 Rajputs of Pali joined him. The British asked Takht Singh to deal with him, however most of the Rathore nobles refused to fight with a fellow clansmen for foreigners. Kushal Singh thus defeated a force of local levies raised by Takht Singh of Jodhpur.
1857–1858	Battle of Chelawas (1857–1858)	Chelawas, Rajasthan	Auwa rebels	British forces	Auwa rebel victory Kushal Singh killed Captain Mason and Hung his head on his fort gate for insulting him, he then defeated a British army of 2,000 men under Brigadier Lawrence.
1857–1858	Siege of Auwa (1857–1858)	Auwa, Rajasthan	Auwa rebels	British forces	British victory An army of 30,000 men under Colonel Holmes forced Kushal Singh to retreat to his fort in Auwa. Holmes besieged the Auwa Fort and breached it after 6 months of siege. Kushal Singh was able to escape to Udaipur. Auwa was then confiscated by the British until the death of Kushal Singh in 1864.
1851–1860	Meena Rebellion of Jahajpur (1851–1860)	Jahazpur, Rajasthan	Meena communities of Jahazpur	Udaipur State forces	The Meenas of Jahazpur pargana in Udaipur State rebelled against the new land and revenue system in 1851. The rebellion continued through the following years, and in January 1860 the Maharana's forces under Chand Singh attacked the Meena villages of Gadoli and Luhori. The villages were looted and burned, numerous Meenas were arrested, and six were executed by cannon fire.

== See also ==
- List of dynasties and rulers of Rajasthan
- List of wars involving India
- Afghan–Sikh Wars
- Mughal–Maratha Wars
- Mughal-Rajput Wars
- Ahom–Mughal conflicts
- Chola–Chalukya wars
- Ancient Hindu wars
- List of Anglo-Indian Wars
- Battles involving the Maratha Empire
- List of battles involving the Sikh Empire
- Military history of the North-West Frontier
- List of early Hindu–Muslim military conflicts in the Indian subcontinent

== Sources ==
- De la Garza, Andrew (2016). The Mughal Empire at War: Babur, Akbar and the Indian Military Revolution, 1500-1605. Routledge. ISBN 9781317245315.
- Irvine, William (1904), The Later Mughals, Low Price Publications, ISBN 81-7536-406-8
- Majumdar, Ashoke Kumar (1956). Chaulukyas of Gujarat. Bharatiya Vidya Bhavan. OCLC 4413150.
- Raghavan, T.C.A. (2018). Attendant Lords: Bairam Khan and Abdur Rahim, Courtiers and Poets in Mughal India. HarperCollins.
- Ram Vallabh Somani (1976). History of Mewar, from Earliest Times to 1751 A.D. Mateshwari. OCLC 2929852.
- Sen, Sailendra Nath (1999) [1999]. Ancient Indian History and Civilization. New Age Publishers. ISBN 81-224-1198-3.
- Sharma, Dasharatha (1959). Early Chauhān Dynasties. S. Chand / Motilal Banarsidass. ISBN 9780842606189.
- Singh, R. B. (1964). History of the Chāhamānas. N. Kishore. OCLC 11038728.
- Dasharatha Sharma (1959). Early Chauhān Dynasties. S. Chand / Motilal Banarsidass. ISBN 9780842606189.
