= Mughal–Rajput wars =

1526–1779 conflicts in India

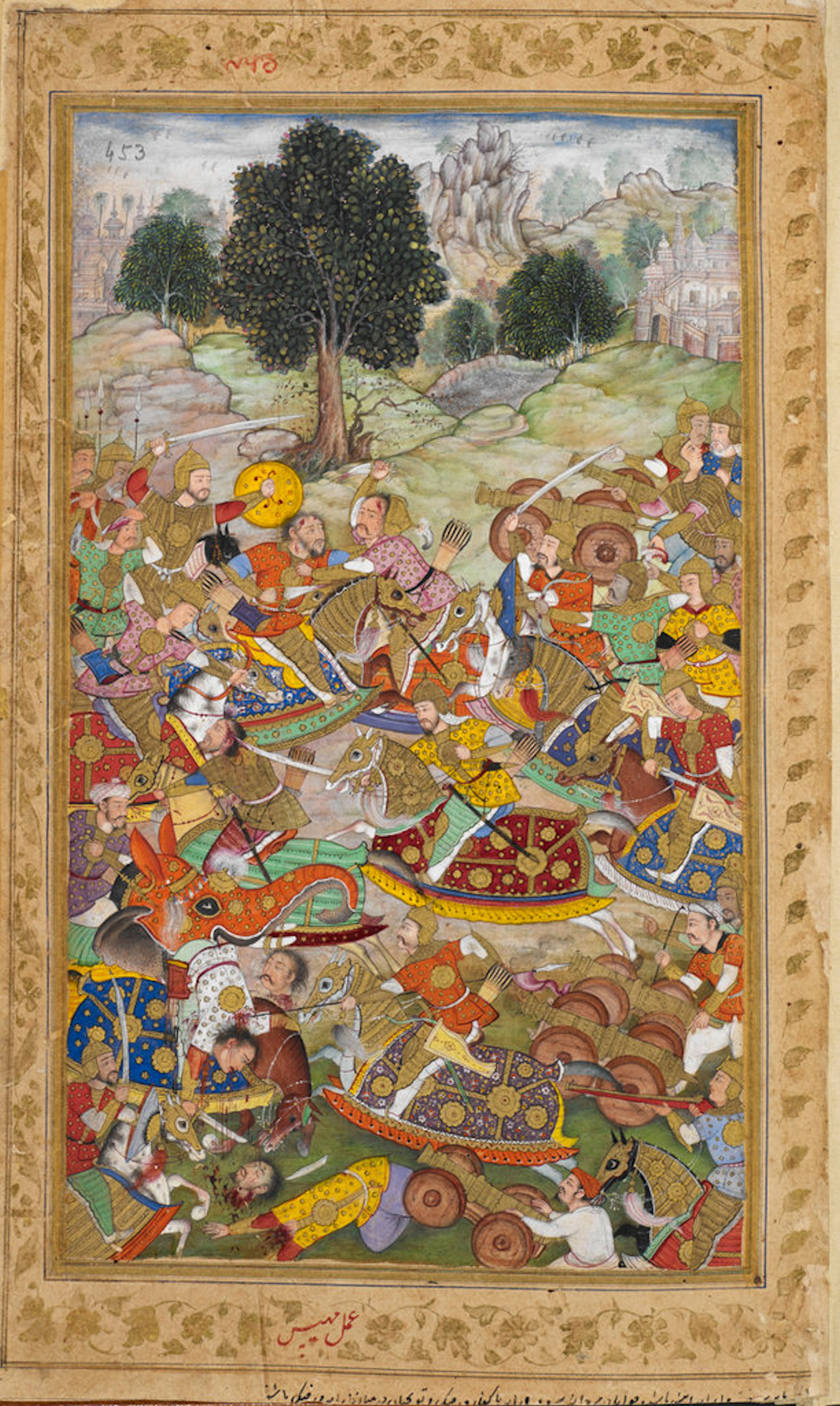
- c. 1590 painting depicting the Battle of Khanwa
Date	21 February 1527 – June 1779
Location	Modern day Haryana, Rajasthan, Gujarat, Uttar Pradesh, Madhya Pradesh, Bihar, Jammu, Himachal Pradesh, Uttarakhand

Belligerents
Mughal Empire	Rajput Kingdoms and Dynasties

Commanders and leaders
Babur; Humayun; Akbar; Jahangir; Shah Jahan; Aurangzeb; Bahadur Shah I Farrukhsiyar	Rana Sanga X Ajja Jhala †; Medini Rai †; Prithviraj Singh I Maldeo Rathore; Udai Singh II; Maharana Pratap (WIA); Chandrasen Rathore; Amar Singh I Durgadas Rathore; Raj Singh I Sangram Singh II; Raja Ajit Singh; Jai Singh; Chhatrasal; Sawai Jai Singh

The Mughal–Rajput wars were a series of battles between various Rajput Kingdoms and Dynasties with the Mughal Empire. The conflict originated with the invasion of India by Timurid King Babur, to which the most powerful Rajput state, Kingdom of Mewar under Rana Sanga, offered staunch resistance. The conflicts went on since 1526 for over 200 years. The conflict can broadly be divided into three phases: 1526 to 1556, which was indecisive; the second happened between 1556 and 1679, largely in Mughal favour; and third between 1679 and 1799, a period marked by Rajput dominance.

The primary reason of the war was the expansionist policy of Mughal Empire which was opposed by some Rajput rulers. Maldeo was the most powerful ruler in Rajputana when Akbar started his expansion in mainland India. Maldeo had recently defeated the Mewar led alliance at Harmoda and conquered the foritified city of Merta. However Maldeo found it hard to recover from his losses suffered against Sher Shah Suri and the continuous battles that he had to continue in order to recover his lost lands. He was also isolated by his fellow neighbouring rulers due to his aggressive expansion. When the Mughal emperor invaded, Maldeo soon started losing his lands against the imperial armies. He lost Nagaur and Ajmer in 1557 and Jaitaran in 1558. In 1562 Akbar conquered Merta and Parbatsar as well. Akbar's "Rajput Policy" also started after these conquests. He gave the Rajputs a choice to either surrender and become Mughal vassals or face invasions and lose their lands. Some sources indicate that Maldeo had sent his son Chandrasen in 1562 to negotiate with Akbar however these negotiations failed due to Maldeo refusing to personally submit to Akbar. The Mughal emperor wanted to vassalize Maldeo but the rebellion of Mirza Sharf-ud-din saved Maldeo and allowed him to rule Marwar until his death in 1562. The Kingdom of Mewar refused to bend the knee due to its foremost place among both Hindu and Rajput states. The situation continued till reign of Aurangzeb, whose rigorous anti-Hindu policy united Kingdom of Mewar and Marwar and later the Kingdom of Amber too. After which Rajput Kingdoms started exploiting the weak position of Mughal emperors after the death of Aurangzeb and made themselves masters of Malwa and Gujarat, which later brought them in conflict with Maratha Confederacy.

== History and phases ==
=== Under Babur ===
In 1526, when Babur invaded Hindustan, his forces faced a stiff resistance from Rana Sanga in the Battle of Bayana, but defeated Rana in the Battle of Khanwa in 1527. Emperor Babur died of natural causes in 1530. The hostility between Rajput Confederacy and the Mughal Empire still continued.

=== Under Akbar ===
Babur's grandson Emperor Akbar faced heavy resistance from Rana Udai Singh II and Maharana Pratap. But the Mughal Army under Akbar achieved numerous victories against the Rajput army. Most prominently in 1576 Akbar achieved a decisive victory in the Battle of Haldighati led by Man Singh I, a Rajput general of the Mughal Empire. The victory led to tremendous gains for the Mughal Empire. Subsequently, Mughals and Rajputs established a peaceful relation with Emperor Akbar accepting many Rajput leaders into Mughal court and giving them top political positions. Chandrasen Rathore led a rebellion for two decades against Akbar, but a large portion of Rajputs accepted Akbar's authority due to his religious tolerance achieving peace and harmony.

=== Under Aurangzeb ===
The peace established during the time of Emperor Akbar was broken by the religious intolerant policies of his great-grandson Aurangzeb. In 1679, the States of Mewar and Marwar rebelled against Aurangzeb. While a peace treaty was signed with Mewar after a year, war with Marwar went on until the death of Aurangzeb and concluded when the Rathore forces were finally able to capture Marwar following Aurangzeb's death which led to a succession war and the eventual decline of the Mughal Empire.

Chhatrasal the Raja of Panna rebelled against Aurangzeb, and later formed his own kingdom on Bundelkhand in the 1720s many years after the death of Aurangzeb during which time the Mughal Empire entered a declining phase.

=== During the decline of the Mughal Empire ===
Since the time of Emperor Aurangzeb his hardline Islamism policies isolated his non-Muslim allies and the power of the Mughal Military had greatly diminished by the time of his death in 1707 and his subsequent successors were generally incompetent rulers. Shortly after Aurangzeb's death, during the Rajput rebellion of 1708–10, the now weakened Mughals were forced to accept a humiliating peace treaty with the Rajput Rajas. The Rajputs forced the Mughals to make them governors of Malwa, Sindh and Gujarat In later years the declining Mughal Empire tried to collect taxes in Rajputana during the late 18th century, however they were met with resistance in every town and village they went, leading to unsuccessful invasions by the Mughal forces. These campaigns affected the Mughal Empire financially and caused arrears and the disbanding of large amounts of troops. The Mughal capital itself was affected during these conflicts, leaving only a few retainers to guard the palace and man the artillery.

== Battles ==
=== Early Mughal–Rajput wars (1527–1616) ===
- Battle of Bayana

Rana Sanga led the Rajput army and besieged the fortress of Bayana held by the Afghans under Nizam Khan in February 1527. Mughal Emperor Babur sent a Mughal contingent under Abdil Aziz, which was defeated by Rana Sanga.

- Battle of Khanwa

The Rajput Confederacy under Rana Sanga was defeated by Babur in 1527. This was the largest battle ever between the Mughals and the Rajputs involving a total of more than 150,000 soldiers and resulted in massive territorial expansions for the Mughal Empire.

- Siege of Chanderi

Babur besieged and captured Chanderi Fort in Malwa and its ruler Medini Rai was defeated and killed in the battle.

- Siege of Bikaner

Rao Jaitsi of Bikaner successfully defended his capital and defeated a Mughal army under Kamran, brother of Mughal emperor Humayun.

- Siege of Chittorgarh

Akbar led the Mughal army in besieging the famed Chittorgarh fort in 1567, which was then under the command of Jaimal Rathore and Patta Singh Sisodia, commanders of Udai Singh. The siege went on for four months, with the fortress walls being breached after the death of Jaimal, ensuring that the Mughals emerged victorious.

- Siege of Ranthambore (1568)

Rao Surjan Hada had to surrender Ranthambore Fort to Akbar after the latter successfully put the fort under siege.

- Battle of Haldighati

The Mughal army under the command of Man Singh defeated Maharana Pratap's Mewari army in the field of Haldighati in 1576. Gogunda was annexed by the Mughals.

- Shahbaz Khan's invasions of Mewar(1577–1580)

Shahbaz Khan's campaigns in Mewar comprised a sequence of battles through which the Mughals effectively subdued key regions of Mewar. These strategically crucial areas encompassed Kumbhalgarh, Mandalgarh, Chittorgarh, Gogunda, Udaipur, and Central Mewar. The Mughal victories solidified their control over these significant parts of Mewar, in the process signifying a pivotal conquest in the expansion of the Mughal Empire's domain in India.

- Pratap's re-occupation of Mewar (1588)

The Mughals had shifted their attention to Punjab and other northwestern provinces after Jaganath Kachwaha's invasion of Mewar. Maharana Pratap took advantage of this situation to attack the Mughal occupied areas and captured thirty-six Mughal outposts. Udaipur, Mohi, Gogunda, Mandal and Pandwara were some of the important areas that were recovered through this conflict. Chittor and Mandalgarh however continued to remain under the Mughals.

- Battle of Dewair (1606)

Both Amar Singh I and Asaf Khan claimed victory in an indecisive battle.
- Battle of Ranakpur-- Rana reorganized his army, and a fierce battle unfolded between the Mewari and Mughal forces of Abdullah at Ranakpur, near Kumbhalgarh, resulting in significant casualties on both sides. The Mewari forces emerged victorious, turning Abdullah Khan's campaign in Mewar, despite its initial success, into a total failure. He was subsequently called back and sent to Gujarat.

- Mughal conquest of Mewar, Amar Singh I surrendered to Shah Jahan in 1615. The Mughals achieved victory the following year in 1616.

=== Later Mughal–Rajput wars (1679–1779) ===
- Rajput War (1679–1707) – A war between the Rathores and the Mughals that lasted for almost 30 years. The war was a result of Mughal Emperor Aurangzeb's religious intolerant policies that broke years long peace between the Mughals and the Rajputs.
  - Battle of Jodhpur (1707) – Durgadas Rathore and Ajit Singh took advantage of the disturbances following the death of Aurangzeb in 1707 to seize Jodhpur when the Mughal Empire ended a declining phase and eventually evict the occupying Mughal force out of Marwar.
- Rajput Rebellion 1708–1710
  - July 1708 – Jai Singh and Ajit Singh storm Amber and Jodhpur and retake their capitals from the Mughal garrisons.
  - July 1708 – Durgadas Rathore routed Saiyid Hussain Khan Barha at Kaladera and forced him to retreat to Narnaul.
  - November–December 1708 – Battle of Kama – Ajit Singh Kachwaha, the Rajput zamindar of Kama defeated the combined armies of Mughal and Jats. After a bitter fight the Mughal Fauzdar Raza Bahadur was killed and the injured Jat chieftain Churaman retreated to Thun.
  - October 1708 – Sayyid Hussain Barha of Mewat and Churaman Jat defeated near Sambhar by the Rathore–Kachhwaha army. Barha shot dead with two of his brothers.
  - January 1710 – Mir Khan of Narnaul with 7000 Mughal troops and Churaman Jat with 6000 Jats effectively checked by Gaj Singh Naruka at Javli.
  - 24 March 1710 – Battle of Tonk – Muhammad Khan of Tonk was defeated by the Rathor–Kachwaha army.
- Battle of Bandanwara

Sangram Singh II of Mewar along with other Rajput chiefs defeated the imperial Mughal army

- Battle of Gangwana

The Battle of Gangwana was a military engagement fought between the Kingdom of Marwar and a combined army of the Jaipur Kingdom and the Mughal Empire in 1741, with the latter emerging victorious and the Rathores being defeated.

- Battle of Mandan

In 1775, The Shekhawati Rajputs defeated a Mughal force under Mitra Sen Ahir, Peero Khan and Kale Khan. After heavy losses Peero Khan died while Mitra Sen Ahir fled.

- Siege of Kanud

A garrison of 400 Rajputs under the ailing Nawal Singh Shekhawat was besieged by a Mughal army. The fort did not fall but Nawal died from his illness. The Mughals negotiated with the garrison and exchanged Kanud fort for other villages, which were given to Nawal's widow as compensation.

- Battle of Khatu Shyamji: Devi Singh Shekhawat repelled the imperial Mughal army under Murtaza Khan Bhadech, but top Rajput leader Mahant Mangal Das was also killed in the battle with no territorial changes in 1779.

== Bibliography ==
- Haig, Wolseley (1925). Cambridge History Of India Vol. 2. Cambridge University Press.
- Sarkar, Jadunath (1960). Military History of India. M. C. Sarkar and Sons Private LTD. Kolkota.
- Somani, Ram Vallabh (1976). History of Mewar: from earliest times to 1751 A.D. Mateshwari Publications.
