= Rajput Rebellion =

Rajput Rebellion may refer to:

- Rathore rebellion (1679–1707)
- Rajput Rebellion (1708–1710)
