= Maline =

Maline may refer to:

== Places ==
- Maline, Mokronog-Trebelno, a village in the Municipality of Mokronog-Trebelno, southeastern Slovenia
- Maline pri Štrekljevcu, a village in the Municipality of Semič, southeastern Slovenia
- Maline, Bosnia and Herzegovina, village in Bosnia and Herzegovina

== People with the surname ==
- Alain Maline (1947–2025), French film director, producer, and screenwriter
- Nicolas Maline (1822–1877), luthier and bow maker
- Pierre Maline (1883–1934), luthier and bow maker

== See also ==
- Fourche Maline
- Malini (disambiguation)
