= Dewair =

Village in India

- Village
- Location within Rajasthan Location within India Location within Asia
- Coordinates: 25.416357°N 73.804119°E
- Country: India
- State: Rajasthan
- District: Rajsamand district

Languages
  - Official: Hindi
- Time zone: UTC+5:30 (IST)

Dewair or Dawer is a village in Rajsamand district, Rajasthan, India. It has a population of 4480. It is located on National Highway 48 (India) (earlier designated National Highway 8), 40 km from Kumbhalgarh and 22 km from Deogarh.

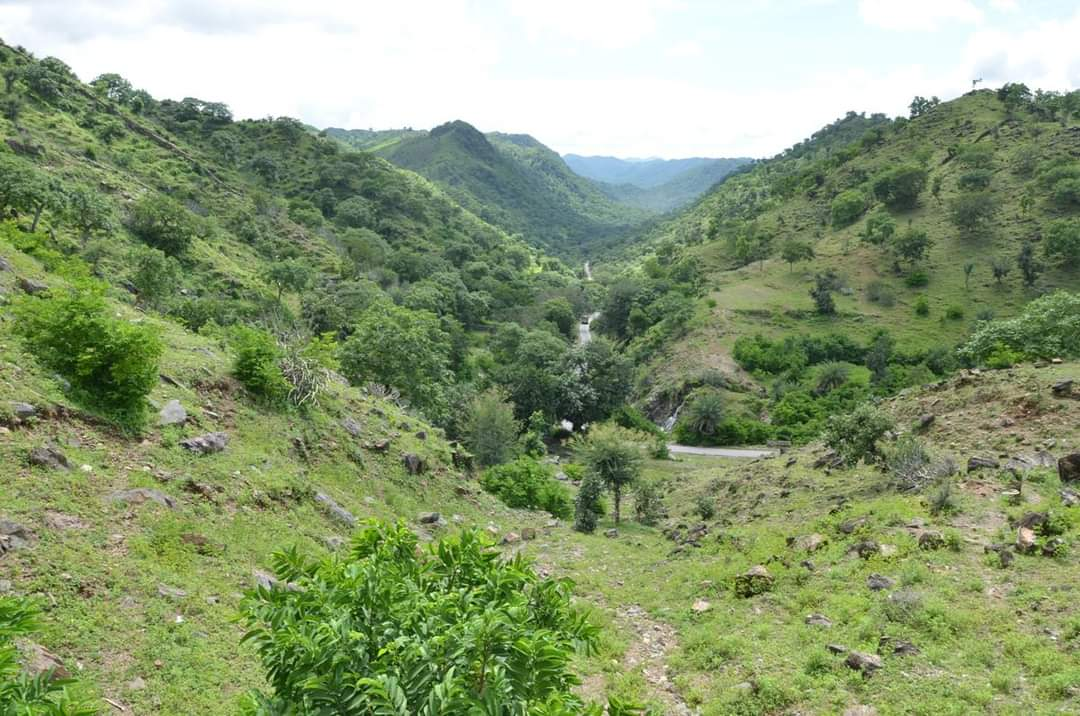
Battlefield of Battle of Dewair 1582 between Maharana Pratap and Mughal Empire

This is the site of the Battle of Dewair (1606) in which Amar Singh I fought Mughal forces of Jahangir.

On 10 January 2012, a victory memorial commemorating the victory of Maharana Pratap at Dewair was inaugurated by the President of India, Smt. Pratibha Patil.

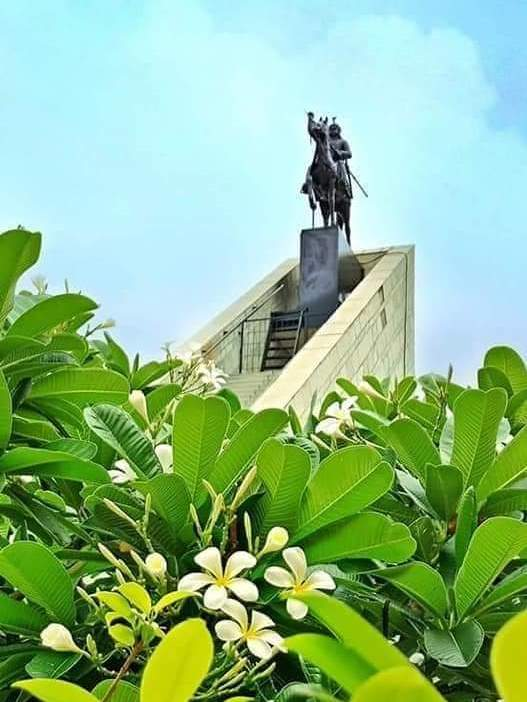
Victory memorial in Dewair
