= Malini =

Malini may refer to:

== People ==
- Max Malini (1873–1942), magician
- Malini Awasthi, Indian folk singer
- Malini Fonseka (1947–2025), Sri Lankan actress, filmmaker and politician
- Malini Gaud, Indian politician
- Princess Malini Nobhadara (1885–1924) of Thailand
- Malini Rajurkar (1941–2023), Hindustani singer
- Malini Sharma, Indian model and actress
  - Malini, a self-titled character played by Sharma in the 2002 Indian film Raaz
- Malini (Tamil actress), South Indian actress

== Places ==
- Mălini, commune in Suceava County, Romania
- Malini, Bulgaria, a village in Gabrovo Province, Bulgaria
- Malinipuri or Malini, a city gifted to Karna by Jarasandha

== In mythology ==
- Malini, an elephant-headed goddess associated with the birth of Ganesha
- Malini, another name for Draupadi, wife of Pandavas during her incognito

== See also ==
- Maline (disambiguation)
- Malani (disambiguation)
