= Panja-i-Mubarak =

Handprint of Mughal emperor

Panja-i-Mubarak پنجہ مبارک
- Panja of Aurangzeb
- Other names: Panja (پنجہ); Panja-i-Khasa-i-Shahanshahi (پنجۂ خاصۂ شہنشاہی)
- Origin: Mughal Empire
- Associated with: Mughal emperors
- Purpose: To signify the emperor's special favour and confer the highest mark of distinction upon the recipient of a letter or firman.
- Method: The emperor's palm, usually the right hand, was coated with a colouring substance and pressed onto the document to leave a handprint.
- Materials: Vermilion; Saffron

The Panja-i-Mubarak, or simply Panja, was a palm print impressed by the Mughal Emperor onto select correspondence and firmans (i.e. decrees) as a mark of royal favour. It was also known as the Panja-i-Khasa-i-Shahanshahi.

== Etymology ==
Panja (پنجه) is a Persian word meaning the palm of the hand with its five fingers, or a hand with the fingers spread out. It is derived from panj (پنج), which means ‘five’. Mubarak (مبارك), by contrast, is an Arabic word derived from barakah (بركة), which means ‘blessing’. It means ‘blessed’ or ‘auspicious’ and is also used as an expression of congratulations. Accordingly, Panja-i-Mubarak may be translated as ‘the Blessed Hand’ or ‘the Holy Hand’. Khas (خاص) means ‘special’ in Urdu, while Shahanshah is a Persian word meaning ‘King of Kings’. Thus, Panja-i-Khasa-i-Shahanshahi literally means ‘the Special Hand of the King of Kings’.

== Background ==
The emperor traditionally conferred three marks of distinction upon recipients of his letters and firmans, according to their rank and the degree of imperial favour he wished to bestow. These consisted of:

1. placing his signature alongside the official seal;
2. writing one or two lines in his own hand at the beginning of the letter or farman; and
3. impressing the mark of his hand upon the document.

Of these, the third was regarded as the highest distinction. The panja was produced by coating the emperor's palm with a colouring substance and pressing it against the document to leave an impression. Either vermilion or saffron was used to coat the emperor's palm. It was usually the right hand.

Following the decline of the Mughal Empire, this practice gradually fell into disuse.

== Usage ==
- Akbar had his panja engraved on the trunk of a tree in the village of Shaikhupur, in the pargana of Daulatabad.
- When Jahangir subsequently visited Shaikhupur, he sought to preserve and commemorate his father's mark. He therefore ordered a marble tablet bearing a replica of Akbar's handprint, together with an engraving of his own panja, to be prepared and installed at the same spot.
- In 1615, Khurram, the future Shah Jahan, defeated Amar Singh I of Mewar and secured his submission before the Mughal throne. As a condition of peace, Amar Singh requested that Jahangir grant him his panja, and Jahangir acceded to his request.
- Following the conclusion of peace between Shah Jahan and Mohammed Adil Shah, the former sent the latter a firman on 6 May 1636. This firman bore his panja impressed in vermilion.
