= Rathore rebellion (1679–1707) =

War between Rajputs and Mughals

Rajput war
- Part of Mughal–Rajput wars
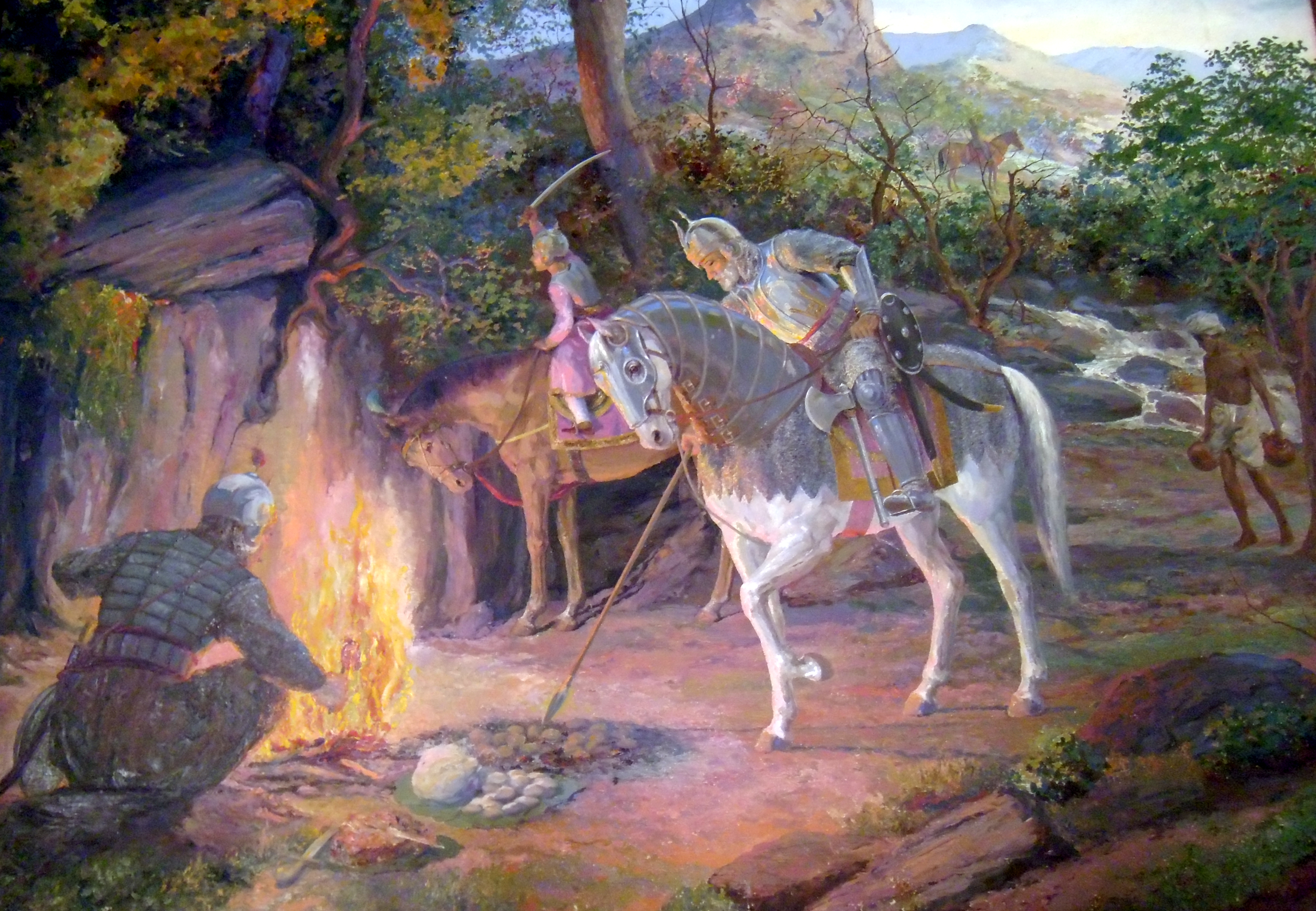
- Painting of Rathore Troops by A.H. Müller in Mehrangarh Fort Museum.
Date	23 July 1679 – 12 March 1707 (27 years, 7 months, 2 weeks and 3 days)
Location	Rajputana
Territorial changes	Jodhpur, Pali, Sojat and Merta captured by Ajit Singh after the death of Aurangzeb

Belligerents
Kingdom of Marwar; Supported by: Kingdom of Mewar	Mughal Empire

Commanders and leaders
Ajit Singh; Durgadas Rathore; Raghunath Bhati; Mukund Das Khinchi Chauhan; Ranchordas Rathore; Sonig Rathore; Ram Bhati; Raj Singh I; Bhim Singh Sisodia; Jai Singh of Mewar	Aurangzeb; Wazir Asad Khan; Prince Akbar; Shaista Khan; Prince Mu'azzam (later Emperor); Prince Azam (later Emperor); Sayyid Hassan Ali Khan Barha; Mir Shihab-ud-din

Strength
25,000 Rathores; 12,000 Sisodias; Total 40,000 Rajputs	Unknown

The Rathore rebellion, described variously as the Rajput War, was the conflict between Rajputs of Marwar and the Mughals that started after the death of Jaswant Singh of Marwar, due to Aurangzeb's attempt to interfere in the succession of Marwar. The resistance to Mughal interference was started by the Rajput nobles under Durgadas Rathore and erupted into an all-out war between the Mughal Empire and Rajputs of Marwar supported by Mewar Rajputs. It lasted for almost thirty years. The rebellion reached a climax after the death of Aurangzeb on 3 March 1707 and the capture of Jodhpur by the Rathores on 12 March 1707.

== Background ==
Jaswant Singh died at Jamrud in November 1678. At the time of his death, two of his wives were pregnant. After Jaswant's demise the Mughal Emperor declared Jodhpur a crown land and placed his officers to control all affairs. The Rathores were not able to retaliate as they were dismayed by their king's death. According to historian Jadunath Sarkar, the date of the attack was 14 May 1680. He also called Jaswant Singh's family to the capital Delhi, on the way Jaswant Singh's two widows gave birth to two sons, one of whom died after birth. The surviving child was named Ajit Singh. Aurangzeb didn't immediately crown Ajit Singh as the ruler and demanded him to be a grown adult first. Instead, a grand-nephew of Jaswant, Inder Singh Rathore was crowned by Aurangzeb.

== Rajput war ==
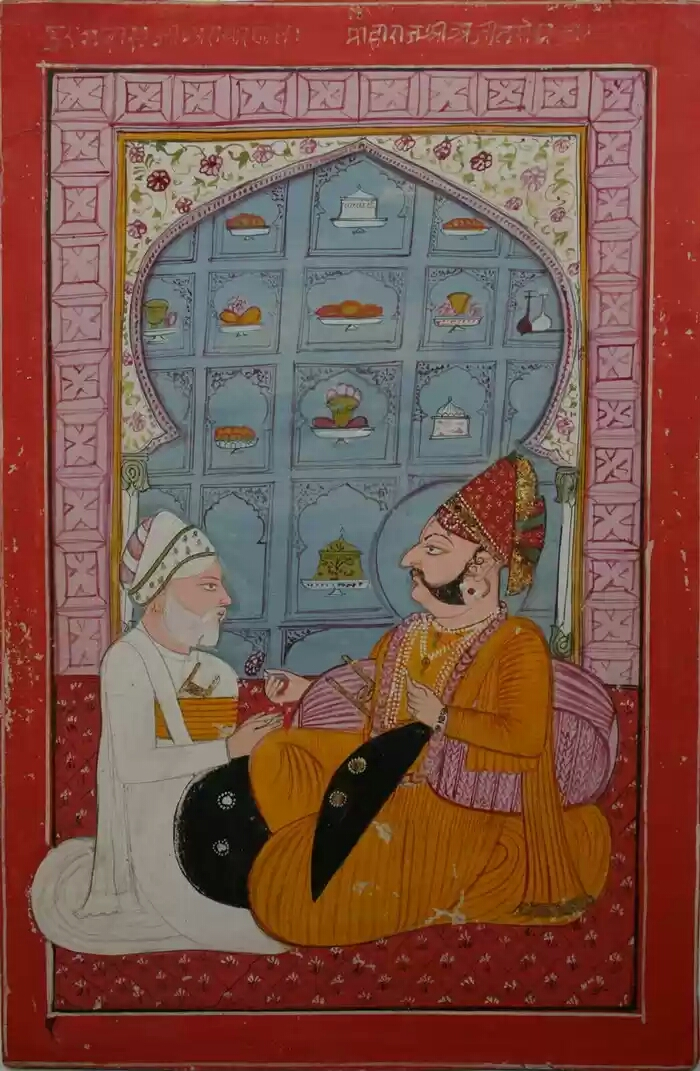
Durgadas Rathore and Ajit Singh

On 23 July 1679, Aurangzeb made attempts to divide Marwar into two Rathore principalities, one held by Inder Singh Rathore and other by Ajit Singh. Aurangzeb also proposed that Ajit Singh should be raised as a Muslim and offered Jodhpur in return. The Jodhpur nobles led by Durgadas opposed this decision, upon which Aurangzeb tried to imprison the infant prince Ajit Singh. An armed detachment under the magistrate of Delhi was sent to capture the prince and queens of Jaswant Singh. Durgadas refused to comply and fired upon the Mughals with Muskets, leading to a conflict. Durgadas disguised the queens as men and personally carried Ajit Singh. After an exchange of fire, the Rajputs charged at the Mughals with lances and paved a way for the prince and the queens to escape. There was a desperate fight through the city in which the rajputs twice fell back and slowed down the pursuing Mughal soldiers, allowing Durgadas to safely lead the prince and the queens back to Jodhpur.

Upon hearing of this news, the Marwar loyalists led by Sonig Rathore and Ram Bhati captured the fort of Jodhpur from the Mughal officers, Tahir Beg and Tahawar Khan. Other loyalists like Sujan Singh also captured the forts of Siwana and Merta. Ajit Singh was soon crowned, and great rejoicing took place in Marwar. Aurangzeb during this time realised that Inder Singh was too unpopular to be of any use and set him aside. He also declared Ajit Singh an imposter and rallied his army from all ends of his empire.

Prince Akbar was sent with an army to occupy Jodhpur. The Rajputs made headstrong and suicidal attacks on the Mughals, but they were unable to stop their advance towards Jodhpur, which was soon occupied by Akbar.

Aurangzeb's religious persecution enraged Rana Raj Singh of Mewar, who was now ready to take up Ajit Singh's cause, resulting in the alliance between the Rathores and the Sisodias. Rana Raj Singh was also opposed to Mughal interference in Rajput politics and detested the Mughals for annexing Mewar's southern and western lands. When the Mughals invaded Marwar, Durgadas had sent messengers to Rana Raj Singh, requesting him to provide shelter for Ajit Singh. Raj Singh agreed and hid Ajit in the mountainous region of Kelwa. Aurangzeb had several reasons to invade Mewar, but giving shelter to Ajit Singh was a major provocation that Aurangzeb could not ignore. The Mughal emperor sent several letters to the Rana, but Raj Singh refused to change his decision.

Aurangzeb was thus quick to retaliate and invaded Mewar; he was initially successful and forced the Rana to retreat into the hills. The war soon became a stalemate. The Mughals failed to capture the hilly tract of Mewar and they suffered against the guerrilla style of war that the Rajputs had now started. The Rajputs also attacked Aurangzeb's son Akbar and took all of the Mughal supplies, reducing the imperial army to starvation. Akbar wrote to Aurangzeb saying that his army "stood motionless through fear". Aurangzeb punished Akbar by replacing him with Azam. Akbar felt insulted and struck a deal with Durgadas to overthrow his father. The Rajputs with the army of Akbar now marched towards Aurangzeb (January 1681), who was at Ajmer. Aurangzeb felt helpless as he had lost his best men and could not summon any reinforcements as they were all stationed elsewhere. However, Akbar delayed his attack. This allowed Aurangzeb to sow dissension between Akbar and the Rajputs by writing false letters and framing his son for deceit. Most of the Rajputs, though not Durgadas, abandoned Akbar and left his camp. Akbar was soon forced to abandon everything and flee to the Deccan with Durgadas. During this time, Ajit Singh was hidden in Sirohi, while the war was continued by different captains of Marwar.

After the death of Rana Raj Singh, Aurangzeb was able to sue for peace with Mewar, upon which the new Rana was forced to give away some land and promise not to help Ajit Singh. But the war with the Rathores continued. In 1686, Durgadas returned and won several victories against the Mughals, prompting Shujaat Khan, the Mughal governor of Gujarat and Jodhpur, to lead an intensive campaign against the Rathors. Under the able command of Durgadas, the Rajputs made continuous attacks on the Mughal officers and forced them to pay tribute in the form of chauth.

During the same year, Aurangzeb's granddaughter, who was in the custody of the Rathors, was returned to him as goodwill. This improved the relations between the Mughals and the Rathors, as Aurangzeb was now ready to recognise Ajit Singh as the Raja of Marwar, but refused to give Jodhpur to him. Ajit Singh tried to capture Jodhpur in 1701 and 1706 but failed in his attempts. Rana Jai Singh of Mewar also remained rebellious during this time and refused to send his horsemen as expected of his rank. Hostilities thus continued until Aurangzeb's death, after which Jodhpur was captured by the Rathores.

== Aftermath ==
Jodhpur was captured by Ajit Singh on 12 March 1707, when he defeated the Imperial Qiledar and either killed or pushed the Mughals out of Marwar. The Mughal succession war gave Ajit Singh enough time to prepare an army and capture Sojat, Pali and Merta. However Bahadur Shah I would soon become the emperor and invade Marwar again, resulting in the Rajput Rebellion of 1708–1710.

== See also ==
- Rajput Rebellion (1708–1710)
- Mughal–Maratha Wars

== Sources ==
- Hooja, Rima (2006). A History of Rajasthan. Rupa. ISBN 9788129115010.
