= Durgadas Rathore =

Rajput General of the Kingdom of Marwar (1638–1718)

Sardar Durgadas Rathore Rajya Sanghrakshak
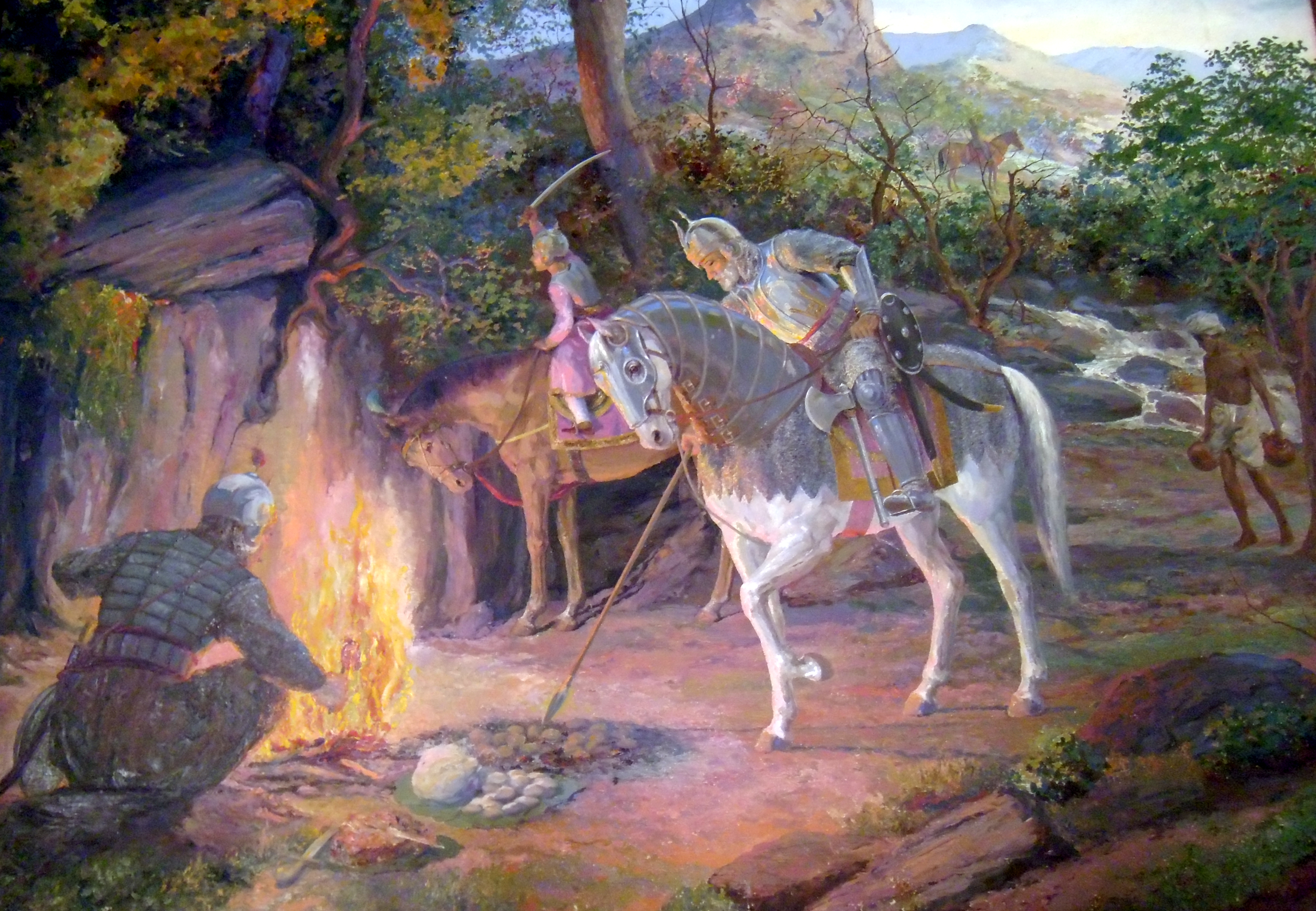
- Painting of Veer Durgadas Rathore by Archibald Herman Müller in the Mehrangarh Fort Museum, Jodhpur.
- Born: 13 August 1638; Selva village, Kingdom of Marwar
- Died: 22 November 1718 (aged 80); Ujjain
- Military career
- Allegiance: Kingdom of Marwar
- Branch: Marwar Army
- Rank: General
- Nickname: Garibaldi of Rajputana
- Conflicts: Rathore rebellion (1679–1707); Rajput Rebellion (1708–1710)

Durgadas Rathore (13 August 1638 – 22 November 1718) was a Rathore Rajput general and statesman of the Kingdom of Marwar, in present-day Rajasthan, India. He is remembered for safeguarding the infant Ajit Singh of Marwar following the death of Maharaja Jaswant Singh in 1678 and for leading a prolonged resistance against Mughal emperor Aurangzeb during the Rathore rebellion (1679–1707). Combining guerrilla warfare with diplomatic alliances, he preserved Marwar’s independence until Ajit Singh was restored to the throne after Aurangzeb’s death in 1707.

Durgadas also played a significant role in the Rajput Rebellion (1708–1710), collaborating with leaders such as Raja Jai Singh II of Jaipur, and supported the Maratha ruler Sambhaji during the Siege of Janjira against the Siddis. He was elected as the leader of the revolt along with Raja Jai Singh II of Jaipur. He won several victories against the Mughals and compelled many Mughal officers to pay tribute in the form of chauth.

== Early life ==
Durgadas was the son of Askaran Rathore, a jagirdar (feudal lord) of Drunera and a Rajput minister under Jaswant Singh, the ruler of Marwar. He was a distant relative of the royal family, being a descendant of Karana, a son of Rao Ranmal.

== Military career ==
=== Safeguarding Ajit Singh (1679–1681) ===
Jaswant Singh was campaigning in Afghanistan when he died in December 1678, leaving no heir. Aurangzeb took the opportunity to intervene by imposing his direct rule over Marwar. Soon after Jaswant Singh's death two of his ranis (queens) each gave birth to male children. One of these sons died soon after his birth, leaving the other – Ajit Singh – as sole heir.

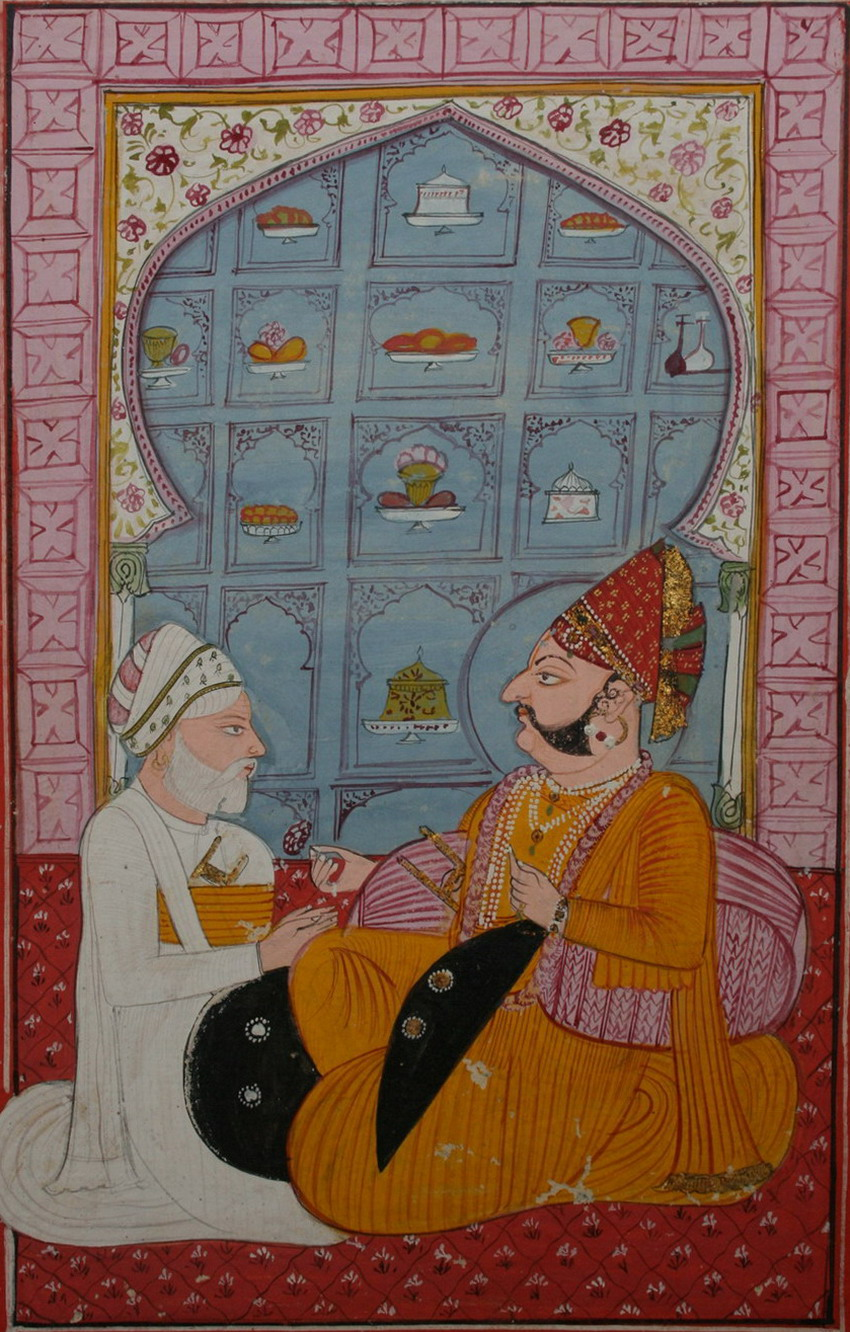
Durgadas Rathore (left) with Maharaja Ajit Singh of Marwar (right)

Aurangzeb ordered the infant, Ajit Singh, to be brought to Delhi where he was kept in Noorgarh under house arrest. Durgadas Rathore and other nobles of Jodhpur made a daring attack on the Mughal contingent of Delhi and rescued Ajit Singh and the widowed ranis of Jaswant Singh. Aurangzeb ordered Tahir Beg and Inder Singh Rathore to capture Durgadas, but they both failed, resulting in a long struggle between Durgadas and Aurangzeb. Fatuhat-i-Alamgiri noted that "all the Rajput households of Marwar had made preparations to challenge the imperial writ". Durgdas thus had the support of the Rajput clans of Marwar.

The infant Ajit Singh was taken to safety in Balunda, where the wife of one of the delegation kept the child for almost a year. Later, he was moved to the safety of the Aravalli Hills near Abu Sirohi, a remote town on the southern fringes of Marwar. There Ajit Singh grew up in anonymity. Rana Raj Singh I also offered refuge to Ajit Singh after which he was hidden in Nandlai, a village in Mewar.

=== Conflict with the Mughal Empire (1681–1707) ===
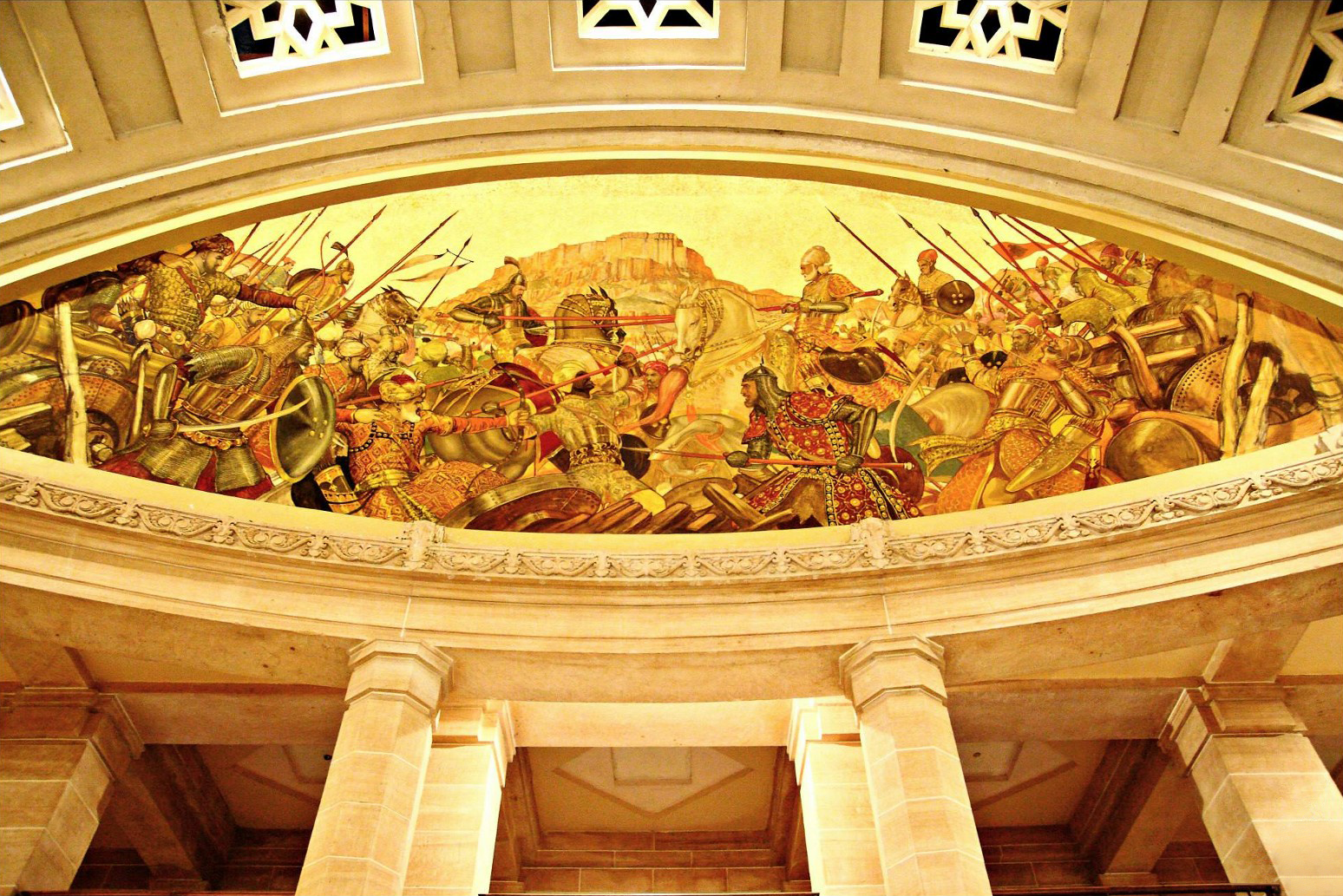
Painting (Fresco) inside Umaid Bhavan Palace, depicting the war between Mughals and Durgadas Rathore with the Mehrangarh fort in the backdrop.

Durgadas, as the leader of the revolt, led his forces against the Mughals and through guerrilla warfare harassed several outposts and compelled the Mughal officers to pay tribute. Durgadas also instigated both Muazzam and Akbar against their father, Aurangzeb. During the war, Durgadas took care of Aurangzeb's granddaughter, Saif-un-nissa, who was in his custody and later returned her to Aurangzeb. The grateful Mughal Emperor bestowed upon Durgadas high ranks and jagirs of Merta and Dhandhuka, however, according to Mirat-i-Alamgiri, Durgadas continued to plead for Ajit Singh's cause instead of being placated by Aurangzeb. Ajit Singh and Durgadas took advantage of the disturbances following the death of Aurangzeb in 1707 to seize Jodhpur and eventually evict the occupying Mughal force. Ajit Singh was proclaimed Maharaja of Jodhpur.

Durgadas was also one of the leaders of the Rajput Rebellion (1708–1710). In July 1708 he routed Saiyid Hussain Khan Barha at Kaladera and forced him to retreat to Narnaul. Durgadas was also instrumental in securing the Rajput victory at Sambhar. Ajit Singh started becoming jealous of the fame and popularity that Durgadas had acquired. Durgadas also started disliking Ajit for his character. Ajit Singh had murdered Mukund Das, who was a loyal noble of Marwar, and this caused Durgadas to drift away from Ajit. After the battle of Sambhar, Durgadas chose to pitch his camp away from Ajit to show his dissatisfaction.

The victory of Ajit Singh was the culmination of Durgadas and other loyal courtiers who chose to remain loyal throughout the Rathore rebellion, however Durgadas was soon exiled by Ajit Singh and his name was erased from the Marwari chronicles after the Battle of Sambhar, in which Durgadas and Jai Singh II won a notable victory against the Mughals. The Mughals, however, continued to woo Durgadas. The Mughal Emperor offered Durgadas the title of Rao and a rank of 4,000 in the Mughal court and official Mughal records continued to write about him till his death. Durgadas was also invited by the Maharana Amar Singh II of Mewar who gave him the jagirs of Rampura and Vijaypur.

== Death ==
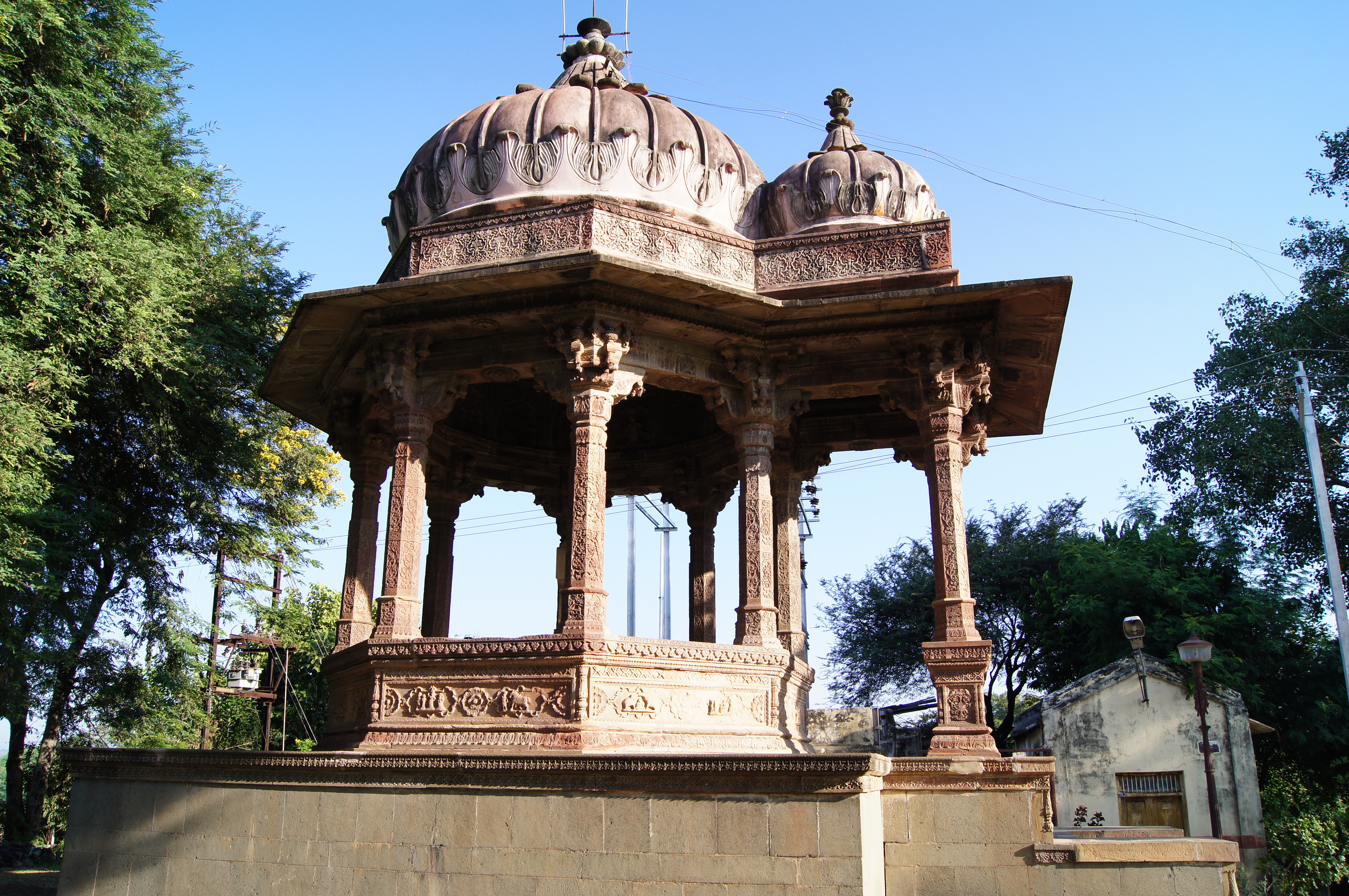
Canopy of Durgadas at Chakratirth, Ujjain

Durgadas left Marwar and lived in Mewar for some time, and then went to Mahakaal in Ujjain. On 22 November 1718, he died at the age of 81 on the banks of the Shipra River in Ujjain.

== Legacy and Honors ==
- Historian Jadunath Sarkar sums up his legacy by commenting:

A soul of honour, he kept the deserted daughter of Akbar free from every stain and provided her with every facility for Islamic religious training in the wilderness of Marwar. Fighting against terrible odds and a host of enemies on every side, with distrust and wavering among his own country-men, he kept the cause of his chieftain triumphant. Mughal gold could not seduce, Mughal arms could not daunt that constant heart. Almost alone among the Rathors he displayed the rare combination of the dash and reckless valour of a Rajput soldier with the tact, diplomacy and organizing power of a Mughal minister of State. No wonder that the Rathor bard should pray that every Rajput mother should have a son like Durgadas.

- The government of India released a commemorative postage stamp for Durgadas Rathore in 1988.

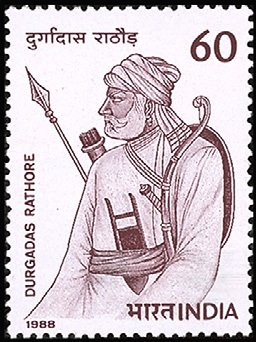
Durgadas Rathore on a postage stamp of Rs. 0.60 released on 26 August 1988

- In 2003, the Government of India issued commemorative coins of ₹1, ₹10, and ₹100 in honor of Durgadas Rathore.
- A road in Ujjain named after him (Veer Durgadas Marg).

== In popular culture ==
- Paintings of Durgadas by painter Archibald Herman Müller (1893) at Mehrangarh Museum, Jodhpur and the Government Museum, Bikaner.
- Durgadas is a children's literature novel written by Premchand based on his struggle.
- A play depicting the life of Durgadas was conducted in Jodhpur in October 2017.
- Indian films based on his life include the silent feature Veer Durgadas (1924) by Bhagwati Prasad Mishra and the 1960 biographical film Veer Durgadas by Ramchandra Thakur, starring Paidi Jairaj in the titular role.
- Amar Chitra Katha Comics have a great biographical comic on his name https://digital.amarchitrakatha.com/id005835307/Durgadas

== See also ==
- List of Rajputs
- Maharana Pratap
