= Malani =

Malani may refer to:

== People ==
Fiji

- Roko Malani (1754–1833), eldest son of Rasolo, the first Tui Nayau (Paramount Chief of Fiji's Lau Islands)
- Ratu Wilisoni Tuiketei Malani (1920-2005), Fijian chief, medical doctor and politician.
- Adi Laufitu Malani (1958-2017), Fijian chief, former medical assistant, a former director of UNIFEM (UN Women) Pacific, former member of Fiji Senate.
- Meli Malani (born 1996), Fijian swimmer

India

- Nalini Malani (born 1946), Indian artist
- Sundeep Malani (born 1971), Indian film director

Pakistan

- Mahesh Kumar Malani, Pakistani politician

Sri Lanka

- Mirihana Arachchige Nanda Malini Perera, commonly known as Nanda Malini, Sri Lankan singer
- Malani Bulathsinhala (1949–2001), Sri Lankan singer

== Other ==
- Malani Horse, a rare breed of horse from the Marwar (or Jodhpur) region of India
- Malani Express, an express train between Old Delhi and Jaisalmer in India
- Malani (river), a river disputed between French Guiana and Suriname

== See also ==
- Malini (disambiguation)
