= Maline, Bosnia and Herzegovina =

Maline
- Village
- Location within Bosnia and Herzegovina
- Coordinates: 44°15′17″N 17°44′0″E
- Country: Bosnia and Herzegovina
- Entity: Federation of Bosnia and Herzegovina
- Canton: Central Bosnia
- Municipality: Travnik

Area
  - Total: 3.82 sq mi (9.89 km^{2})

Population (2013)
  - Total: 1,095
  - Density: 287/sq mi (111/km^{2})
- Time zone: UTC+1 (CET)
  - Summer (DST): UTC+2 (CEST)

Maline is a village in the municipality of Travnik, Bosnia and Herzegovina.

== Demographics ==
According to the 2013 census, its population was 1,095.

Ethnicity in 2013
Ethnicity	Number	Percentage
Bosniaks	991	90.5%
Croats	96	8.8%
Serbs	1	0.1%
other/undeclared	7	0.6%
Total	1,095	100%
