= Amar Singh I =

Maharana of Mewar from 1597 to 1620

Maharana Amar Singh I
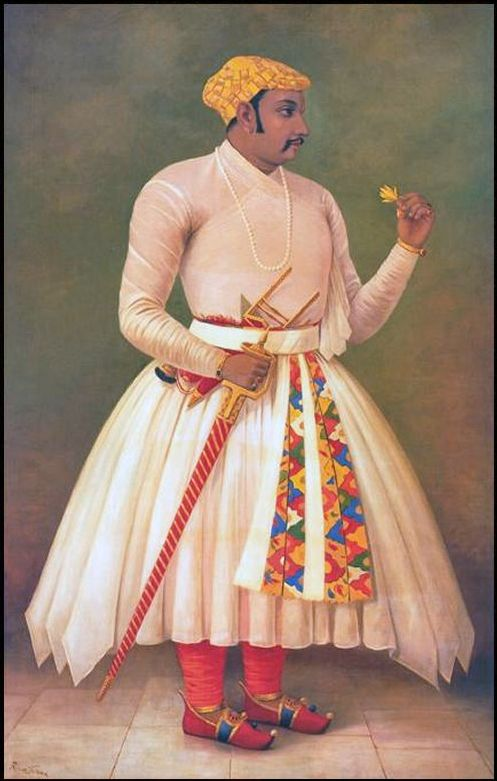
- Painting of Maharana Amar Singh I

Maharana of Mewar
- Reign: 19 January 1597 – 26 January 1620
- Coronation: 19 January 1597 Udaipur
- Predecessor: Maharana Pratap
- Successor: Karan Singh II
- Born: 16 March 1559; Chittor Fort, Mewar, Rajputana
- Died: 26 January 1620 (aged 60); Udaipur, Mewar, Rajputana
- Spouse: Rathorji Laksh Deiji of Idar; Solankiniji Manbhawat Deiji of Virpur/Lunawada in Gujarat; Tomarji Shyam Deiji of Gwalior; Rathorji Ram Deiji of Marwar; Jhaliji Raj Deiji of Delwara in Mewar; Rathorji Satyabhama Deiji of Chavand in Mewar; Hadiji Manbhawan Deiji of Bundi; Rathorji Rukhmawat Deiji of Siwana in Marwar
- Issue: Karan Singh II; Surajmal; Bhim Singh; Arjun Singh; Ratan Singh; Bagh Singh; Kesar Kanwarji m. to Rao Surtan Deora I of Sirohi
- House: Sisodia
- Father: Maharana Pratap
- Mother: Parmarji Ajab Deiji d.of Rao Mamrakh of Bijolia in Mewar
- Religion: Hinduism
- Military career
- Conflicts: Battle of Dewair (1606); Battle of Ranakpur; Siege of Ontala (1599)

Maharana Amar Singh I the Sisodia-Rajput ruler of the Mewar Kingdom (16 March 1559 – 26 January 1620), was the eldest son and successor of Maharana Pratap I. He was the 14th Rana of Mewar, ruling from 19 January 1597 until his death on 26 January 1620.

== Birth and coronation ==
Amar Singh I was the eldest son of Maharana Pratap I. He was born in the old capital fortress of Chittor on 16 March 1559 to his father's chief queen Ajabde Punwar, who belonged to the Parmarji of Bijolia, a fiefdom under Mewar in the same year when foundation of the new capital city of Udaipur was laid by his grandfather, Udai Singh II. Amar Singh I succeeded Pratap upon his death on 19 January 1597 and was the ruler of Mewar until his own death on 26 January 1620.

== Conflict with the Mughals ==
By the end his reign Maharana Pratap was able to recover much of his ancestral kingdom which included all 36 outposts of Mewar, apart from Chittor and Mandalgarh which continued to remain under the Mughals.

Against Akbar

After Pratap's death, Akbar dispatched a strong force with Raja Man Singh, Shah Kuli Khan and other senior Mansabdars under the nominal command of Prince Salim (later Emperor Jahangir). Rana Amar Singh, following his father's policy, sought refuge in the hilly regions of western Mewar. His forces resisted the Mughals, launching surprise attacks on their outposts. Sultan Khan Ghori, stationed at Bagor, was unexpectedly attacked and killed. Later, Prince Salim arrived in Udaipur and ordered his commanders to intensify efforts against the Mewar forces. In response, Maharana launched a counter-attack near Malpura, plundering several towns. Additionally, he conducted a night raid on a Mughal outposts. The Mughal campaign ended inconclusively as Man Singh was called to Bengal without any significant achievements.

Towards the end of his reign, Akbar invested Sagar, a son of Rana Udai Singh II, with the title of Rana and intended to set him on the throne of Chittor. Akbar was actually preparing to send a force under Khusrau Mirza to install Sagar, but before this could be done, Akbar died.

=== Against Jahangir ===
Parviz's Invasion of Mewar

Shortly after his accession in 1606, Jahangir sent an army of 20,000 cavalry to attack Mewar. Parviz Mirza was the commander in name only while in reality the de facto commander was Jahangir who directed Asaf Khan. Amar led a hard fought battle to defend his territory and personally killed the Mughal commander Sultan Khan and his horse with a spear which went through them both.

Mahabat Khan's invasion

In 1608, an army under Mahabat Khan was sent to Mewar through Mandal and Chittor. This army was defeated and had to retreat because of continuous raids by Rajput forces.

Abdullah Khan's invasion

In 1609, Mahabat Khan was replaced by Abdullah Khan who was able to achieve initial success from 1609 to 1611. In an attack by Abdullah Khan on Chavand, about 2000–3000 Rajputs staying there fought till death and Amar Singh was forced to abandon the capital. Abdullah Khan was eventually defeated by Mewari forces at Battle of Ranakpur in 1611 rendering his expedition a total failure. He was then dispatched as governor of Gujarat in 1611 and at his request Raja Basu was appointed to the command of the Mughul army in Rajasthan. But apparently he was defeated again and failed to meet the objectives. He was recalled and Khan A‘zam Mirza Aziz Koka sent in 1613 to replace him.

Final conflicts

Upon his request for assistance, in 1613, Jahangir himself came to Rajputana to supervise the campaign. His son Khurram led the campaign on the ground. The Rajputs were easily able to seek refuge in the hilly tracks of Rajputana and the Mughals largely failed to penetrate the area. They were finally able to penetrate it in 1614 when they engaged with the Mewar forces and established outposts. Many attempts were made by Jahangir to reach a settlement with the Maharana and the final attempt in 1615 succeeded when Amar Singh agreed to meet with Prince Khurram.

The long war had depleted Amar Singh's resources and thus he prepared to submit. His step caused the 48 years long war of attrition to come to an end. There were strict instructions from Jahangir to Khurram to treat Amar Singh honourably as Jahangir notes:

In 1615, Amar Singh submitted to Mughals. The condition of submission were framed in such a manner so as to befit both sides. Due to his old age, Amar Singh was not asked to attend the Mughal Court in person and Mewar including Chittor was assigned to him as Watan Jagir. The successor of Amar Singh, Karan Singh on the other hand was given a rank of 5000. Mughals on the other hand secured their interest by prohibiting the fortifications of the Mewar. One of the conditions of his submission was that he be granted Jahangir’s panja, and Jahangir acceded to his request.

== Peace treaty ==
After Mewar was devastated financially and in manpower due to several battles against the Mughals, Amar Singh thought it prudent to start negotiations with them and finally entered into a treaty with Shah Jahan (who negotiated on behalf of Jahangir) in 1615. He was advised by his council and his grandmother, Jaiwanta Bai, his advisor.

In the treaty, it was agreed that:

- The ruler of Mewar would not be bound to present himself in person at Mughal court. Instead, a relative of the Rana would wait upon the Mughal Emperor and serve him.
- It was also agreed that the Ranas of Mewar would not enter into matrimonial relations with the Mughals.
- Mewar would have to keep a contingent of 1500 horsemen in the Mughal service.
- Chittor and other Mughal occupied areas of Mewar would be returned to the Rana, but the Chittor fort would never be repaired. The reason for this last condition was that the Chittor fort was a very powerful bastion and the Mughals were wary of it being used in any future rebellion.
- The Rana would be given a Mughal rank of 5000 zat and 5000 sowar.
- The rulers of Dungarpur and Banswara (who had become independent during Akbar's reign) would once again become vassals of Mewar and pay tribute to the Rana.

Later, when Amar Singh went to meet Jahangir at Ajmer, he was given a warm welcome by the Mughal Emperor. The territories around Chittor, along with the Chittor Fort, were given back to Mewar as a goodwill gesture. However, Udaipur remained the capital of Mewar State.

== Assessment ==
Amar Singh was admired for his bravery, leadership, valour, and sense of justice and kindness. He showed great valour against the Mughals to which he was given the title 'Chakraveer'. Amar Singh patronised an author called Mathuratmaja ("son of Mathura"), who wrote Amara-bhushana (IAST: Amarabhūṣaṇa) and Ishta-ghatika-shodhana (Iṣṭaghaṭikāśodhana). These works are sometimes attributed to Amar Singh (Amara-siṃha).

== Death ==
The remaining years of Amar Singh’s reign were uneventful. It is said that he felt the insult of accepting a Mughal farman so keenly that he retired to his private chamber, leaving the administration in the hands of the heir-apparent, Karan Singh II. He died on 26 January 1620.

== Popular culture ==
=== Films and television ===
- In the 2023 ZEE5's web series Taj: Divided by Blood, he is portrayed by Akshay Agarwal.

== See also ==
- Chundawat
- Shaktawat

== Notes ==
Amar Singh I Sisodia Rajput Clan Born: 16 March 1559 Died: 26 January 1620
Preceded by Maharana Pratap	Sisodia Rajput Ruler; 1597–1620	Succeeded by Karan Singh II
