= Rajput Rebellion (1708–1710) =

Rajput Rebellion 1708–1710

Rajput rebellion 1708–1710
- Part of Mughal-Rajput Wars and Decline of the Mughal Empire
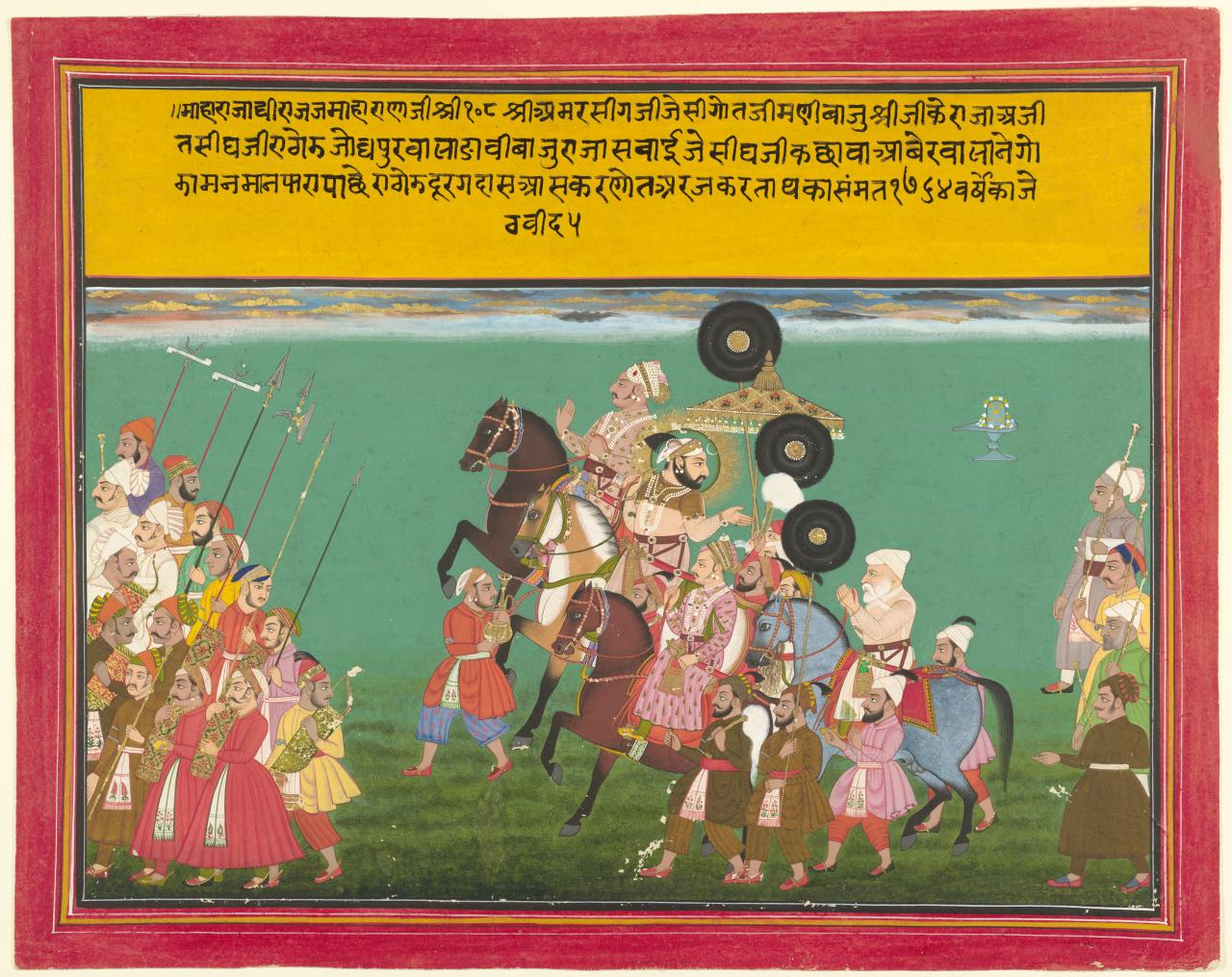
- A Mewari painting depicts the alliance between Ajit Singh of Marwar, Amar Singh II, Jai Singh II, and Durgadas Rathore.
| Date | 21 April 1708 – 11 June 1710 (2 years, 1 month and 3 weeks) |
| Location | Rajputana (Modern day Rajasthan, Haryana and Delhi NCR) |
| Result | Rajput victory: Mughal emperor sued for peace.; Restoration of the Rajput holdings which had been annexed by the previous Mughal Emperor Aurangzeb. |

Belligerents
| Kingdom of Marwar; Kingdom of Amber; Supported By; Kingdom of Mewar | Mughal Empire |

Commanders and leaders
| Jai Singh II; Ajit Singh of Marwar; Durgadas Rathore; Amar Singh II | Bahadur Shah I Churaman; Azad Khan; Sayyid Hussain Barha †; Mir Khan; Muhammad Shah |

The Rajput rebellion began in 1708, due to the harsh treatment of the Rajput Rajas by the Mughal emperor. It erupted into a two-year rebellion that forced the Mughal emperor to sue for peace, give them gifts, and restore the Rajput holdings which had been annexed by the previous Mughal emperor Aurangzeb.

== Background ==
After the death of Aurangzeb, a battle for succession began amongst the Mughal princes. Jai Singh II was a teenager then and commanded a thousand troops under Bidar Bakht. On 8 June 1707, Bidar Bakht and his father Azam Humayun were killed in battle and Jai Singh retreated. Bahadur Shah after becoming the new emperor marched towards Rajputana where the Rathors under Durgadas had been fighting the Mughals for thirty years. Ajit Singh had taken Jodhpur after the death of Aurangzeb and ousted Mehrab Khan and the Mughal garrisons. During this campaign Bahadur Shah was suspicious of Jai Singh II as he had been a good friend of Bidar Bakht and fought Bahadur at Jajau. Jai Singh's younger brother Bijay Singh on the other side had been with Bahadur Shah for a longer period of time. Therefore, when Bahadur Shah stopped at Amber on 10 January 1708 on his way to Marwar, he made Bijay Singh the Raja of Amber and removed Jai Singh from his post and made him an ordinary Jagirdar. When Bahadur Shah reached close to Marwar, Ajit Singh started negotiations after seeing the size of the imperial army. On 24 March, Bahadur Shah was forced to march south due to his brother Kam Baksh's rebellion. The emperor forced Ajit Singh and Jai Singh II to march with him and empowered Bijay Singh by giving him the title of Mirza Raja. However Bijay Singh was powerless in Amber as Jai Singh's men had neutralized the Mughal authorities there. Bahadur Shah had thus repeated the Marwar scenario of Aurangzeb which had previously resulted to the thirty-year war with the Rathors. Ajit Singh and Jai Singh II fled from the Mughal camp when they got a chance at Mandleshwar on 21 April 1708, they met Maharana Amar Singh and made an alliance. Jai Singh II also married the Maharana's daughter. The Rajput rebellion had thus begun.

== Rebellion ==
Bahadur Shah was forced to move south and could not come back till 12 June 1710. During this time, the Rajput Kingdoms of Marwar and Amber united against the Mughals. Jai Singh II and Durgadas Rathore took up the cause of the rebellion. The Mughal regent Asad Khan attempted to make peace with the Rajputs, however this was unsuccessful.

Ajit Singh and Jai Singh II had taken their capitals back from the Mughal Garrisons. Jodhpur was recaptured in July and Amber in October 1708. Sayyid Hussain Barha and Churaman Jat were sent with a large force to retake Amber, however Barha was shot dead with his brothers and the Mughals were defeated. Three thousand Mughals were killed at Sambhar. Jai Singh in his letter to Chattrasal has written that "among the dead were all three Faujdars". The Rajputs also took all the Mughal treasury of Sambhar and distributed it among the people. When Bahadur Shah got to know of this defeat, he immediately tried to sue for peace by offering to restore Ajit Singh and Jai Singh to their thrones, however the Rajputs demanded the restoration of their lands that had been forcefully taken by Aurangzeb in 1679 and the expulsion of the Mughals from Rajputana. The Mughal Emperor was not ready to do this and the war continued.

Mughal faujdars were sent to pillage the farms and villages, although they met with resistance in every fort that they crossed. Mir Khan, the faujdar of Narnol had gathered 7,000 mughals and was joined by 6,000 Jats under Churaman. However, in January 1710 this army was effectively checked by Gaj Singh Naruka of Javli, who was loyal to Jai Singh. On 24 March 1710, Muhammad Shah, the governor of Tonk was defeated and forced to abandon his holdings. The Rajput Rajas had formed military outposts at Rewari and Narnaul, 45 miles from Delhi and sent their armies towards Delhi, Rohtaka and Agra to harass the Mughals. Jai Singh II also sent letters to the Bundelas, Sikhs and the Marathas in order to spread discontent in the country against the Mughals.

== Aftermath ==
When Bahadur Shah returned, he had no choice but to negotiate with the Rajputs. Gifts and letters were sent to the two rebel Rajas in May 1710. The rise of Banda Singh Bahadur and death of Wazir Khan, faujdar of Sirhind, further caused fear in the Mughal court and on 11 June 1710 Jai Singh and Ajit Singh were invited to the Mughal court and were given robes of honour, presents and governorships of Malwa and Gujarat.

== See also ==
- Rathore rebellion (1679–1707)
- Mughal–Maratha Wars
