= Archibald Herman Müller =

Indian painter (1878–1960)

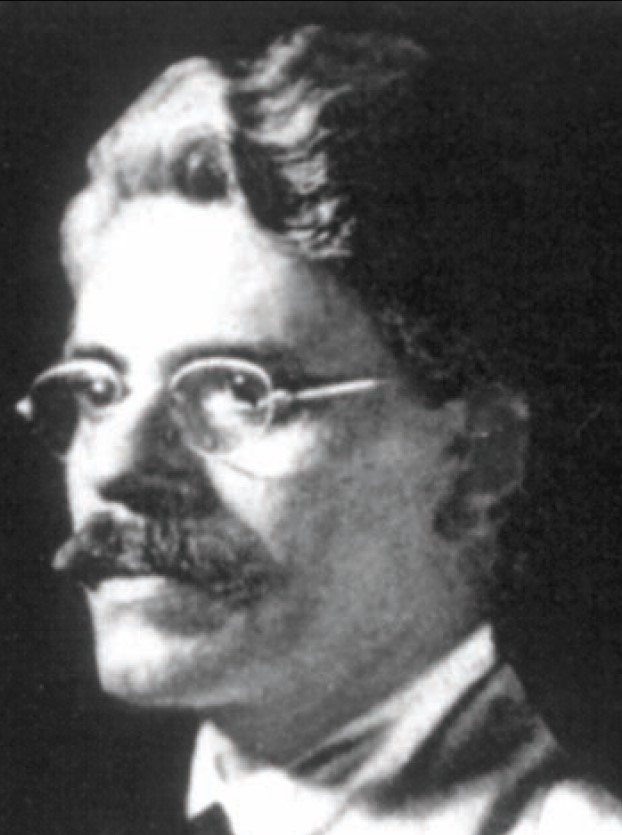
- Portrait of Archibald Herman Müller
- Born: 11 April 1878; Kochi, Kerala, British Raj
- Died: 24 September 1960 (aged 82); Jodhpur, Rajasthan, India
- Education: Madras School of Art, Madras
- Known for: Painting
- Style: Realism

Archibald Herman Müller (11 March 1878 – 24 September 1960) was an Indian painter of German and Indian descent, celebrated for his academic realism and religious themes. His works portraits, royal court scenes, and dramatic depictions of Hindu epics were acquired by prestigious institutions such as Buckingham Palace and the Victoria & Albert Museum, as well as major museums in India.

== Early life ==
Müller, the son of a German father and Indian mother , was born in Cochin in the Southern Indian state of Kerala, and lived and worked in India. He joined the Madras School of Art and received early recognition. He won the gold medal at Madras School of Art. After completing his education, he worked with his brother in his photography studio for some time.

== Professional life ==
Müller went to Bombay (now Mumbai) in 1911, then considered the modern artistic centre of India. He won the Gold Medal from the Bombay Art Society in the same year. He travelled a lot through Maharashtra, Rajasthan, Gujarat and the Himalayas, enjoying the patronage of various Indian royal families. His paintings included landscapes, portraits and scenes from the life of the Maharajas (Kings), historical subjects and incidents from the Hindu epics, the Ramayana and the Mahabharata. His paintings have been acquired by the Buckingham Palace, London, the South Kensington Museum (now known as the Victoria and Albert Museum). Few also exist in the collections of the museums at Sangli, Maharashtra Bikaner, Rajasthan, the Jodhpur Fort and the Royal Palace at Jaipur. His paintings are much sought after and have surfaced in various auctions in recent years.

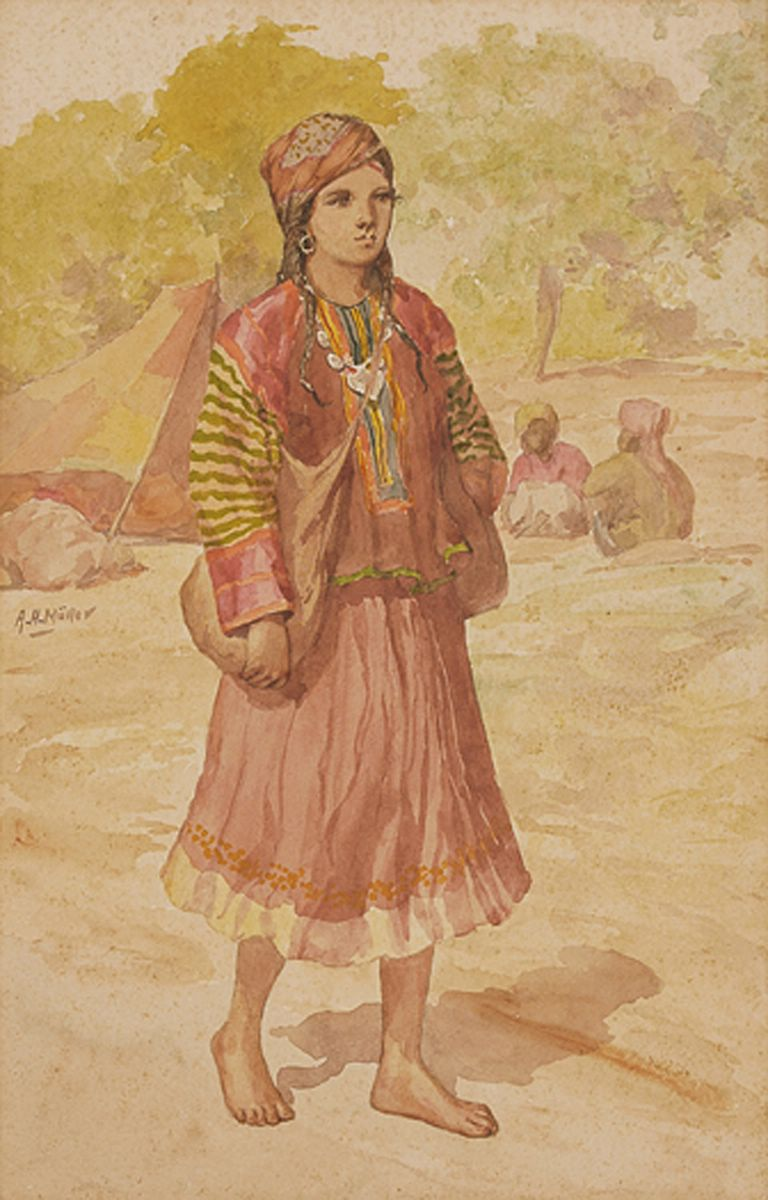
Untitled painting by Archibald Herman Müller

== Death ==
Müller died in 1960 at the Gandhi Hospital in Jodhpur, Rajasthan, India.

== Legacy ==
His children moved from India in the 1950s and 1960s. Two daughters, Gwendoline Ellen and Winifred Rose, moved to the UK, and his son, Archibald Hermann Müller (known as Hermann), to Australia in 1967. Several individuals from succeeding generations of his family have proved to be talented artists and writers, some exhibiting nationally and internationally. One of his daughters, Gwendoline (1929-2012), who lived in Prestatyn, North Wales, auctioned many of her paintings for charity. Winifred (Winnie) (1930-2016), also lived in North Wales and continued to paint into her eighties. Son Hermann (1936-2017), inspired by his father's paintings at an early age, expressed his creative talents as an author, and, having studied the bodymind connection, founded the Psychosomatic Therapy College and developed the Psychosomatic Therapy Process which is taught in many countries . Hermann lived on the Gold Coast, Queensland. Highly accomplished contemporary artist Charlotte McGowan-Griffin (1975-), born in London and based in Berlin , is a great-granddaughter of A H Müller.
