= Chandrasen Rathore =

Rao of Marwar from 1562 to 1581

Rao Chandrasen
- Rao
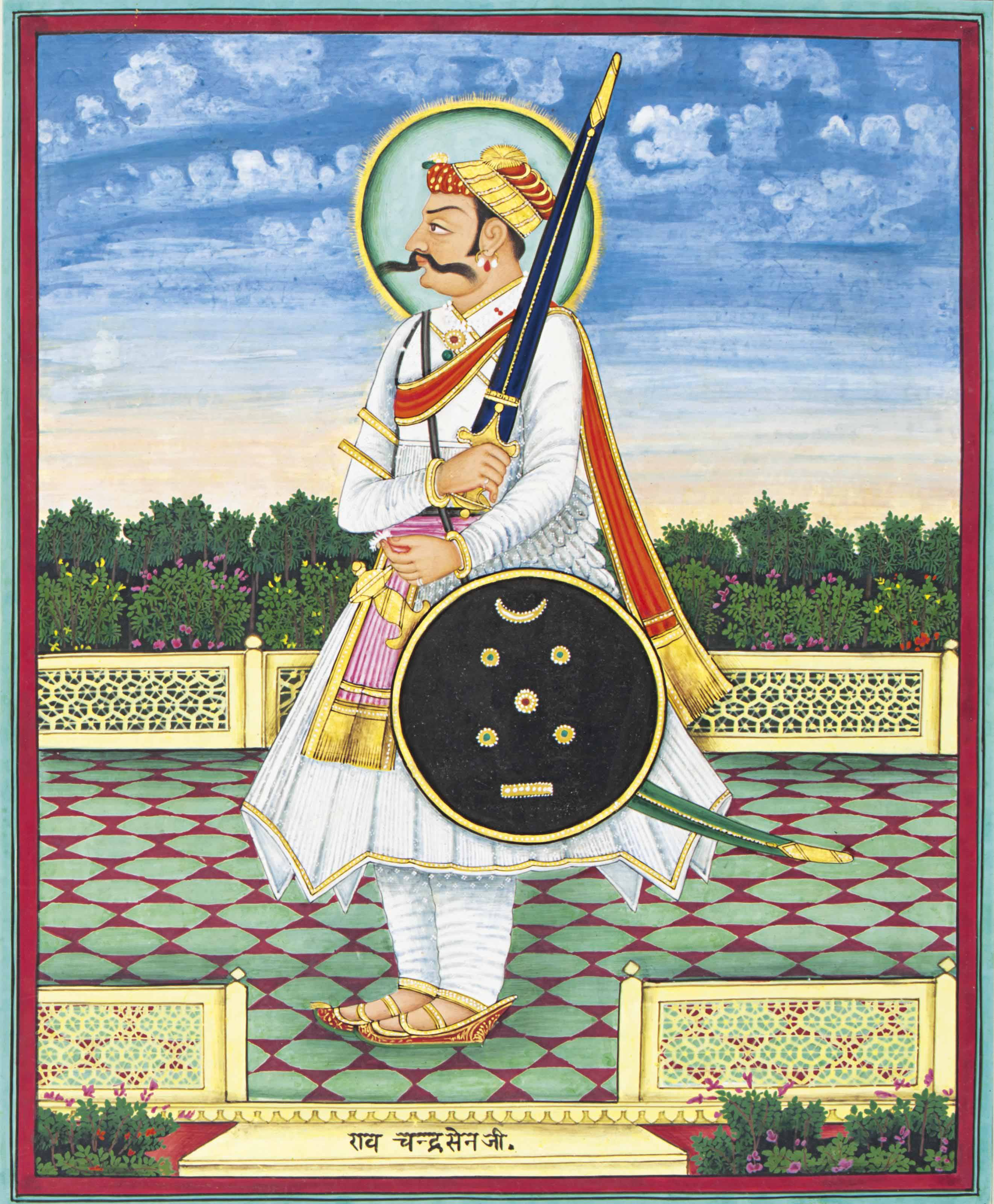
- Rao Chandrasen Rathore

Rao of Marwar
- Reign: 7 November 1562 – 11 January 1581
- Coronation: 31 December 1562
- Predecessor: Rao Maldeo Rathore
- Successor: Udai Singh
- Born: 30 July 1541
- Died: 11 January 1581 (aged 39)
- Spouse: Sanchoriji (Chauhanji) Kalyan Deiji of Sacro in Marwar Narukiji Kachwahiji Suhag Deiji of Phagi in Amber Bhatiyaniji Saubhag Deiji of Jaisalmer Sisodiniji Suraj Deiji of Mewar Narukiji Kachwahiji Kumkum Deiji of Kakor in Amber Devadiji (Chauhanji) Omkar Deiji of Sirohi Bhatiyaniji Harkam Deiji of Barsalpur in Jaisalmer Bhatiyaniji Prem Deiji of Pugal in Bikaner Bhatiyaniji Jagisam Deiji of Bikampur in Jaisalmer Sodhiji (Parmarji) Megham Deiji of Amarkot
- Issue: Rai Singh Askaran Ugrasen Jambwant Deiji m.to Rao Vijay Singh from Sirohi Asha Deiji m.to Man Singh I of Amber Kamal Deiji m.to Kunwar Govardhan of Narwar Rai Deiji m.to Kunwar Sabal Singh of Amber
- Dynasty: Rathore
- Father: Rao Maldeo Rathore
- Mother: Jhaliji Swarup Deiji d.of Rana Jait Singh of Delwara in Mewar

Rao Chandrasen (30 July 1541 – 11 January 1581) was a Rathore Rajput ruler of the Kingdom of Marwar. He was a younger son of Rao Maldev Rathore. He followed his father's policy and stayed hostile to the ruling foreign powers in north India. He is remembered for resisting the territorial expansion of the Mughal Empire in Marwar.

== Early life ==
Born on 16 July 1541, Chandrasen was the sixth son of Rao Maldeo, Raja of Marwar. He was also the younger brother of Udai Singh, his successor.

Maldeo named him his successor, putting aside the claims of his older brothers, Ram and Udai Singh. This led to an eternal rivalry between Chandrasen and Udai Singh.

== Reign ==
On the death of Rao Maldeo, Chandrasen ascended the gadi (throne) of Marwar.

Although Marwar had no law of Primogeniture, rarely had the rights of the older child been put aside. This led to feud between Chandrasen and his brothers.

In 1562, Ramchandra, Udai Singh and Raimal rebelled at Sojat, Gangani and Dunda respectively. When Chandrasen sent an army to subdue them, Ramchandra and Raimal fled the battlefield without facing him.

In December 1562, Chandrasen fought Udai Singh and defeated him in Lohawat. In this battle, both sides suffered great losses in men and material. Udai Singh had given a blow with an axe to Chandrasen, and he also received a blow from Rawal Megh Raj, an ally of Chandrasen.

Chandrasen then fought Ramchandra at Nadol in 1563 and when Ramchandra saw no chance of his success, he fled to Nagore. Akbar took advantage of these internal disputes, and with the help of the rajas of Bikaner and Amer, fought Chandrasen in several battles.

In 1564, Hussain Quli Khan-i-Jahan invaded and captured the fort of Jodhpur. Chandrasen was then forced to retreat to Bhadrajun. Chandrasen Rathore continued to defy Mughal suzerainty by attacking the imperial forces every now and then. He also succeeded in establishing himself in the northern part of Marwar. However, he failed to consolidate his position and lost both men and material. The initial six years of his exile seems to be the hardest and he was forced to sell his family's heirlooms in order to continue his struggle.

Akbar besieged the fort of Bhadrajun and captured in 1571. Chandrasen escaped to the fort of Siwana . The same year Rao Chandrasen was welcomed by Rana Udai Singh II of Mewar and his daughter was married to the Rao. After the matrimonial alliance Chandrasen attacked several Mughal outposts with renewed vigour. The situation however changed after Rana Udai Singh's death in 1572. Rana Pratap, who succeeded to the throne, refused to help Chandrasen as he was himself faced with many problems. Disappointed by these developments, Chandrasen left Mewar.

In 1575 a powerful Mughal operation was launched against Chandrasen under Shah Quli Khan, Rai Singh, Keshav Das and Shahbaz Khan.

Akbar then had sent Jalal Khan to capture Chandrasen. But in the hot pursuit of Chandrasen, Jalal Khan lost his life. It seems the garrison used by Chandrasen at Siwana were sufficiently secured as could not be dislodged by the strenuous efforts put by Jalal Khan and other. He had also put a troop of faithful Rathors of Durana.

Finally in his 21st regnal year, Akbar had decided to put an end to the thing and sent a strong force under Mir Bakhshi Shahbaz Khan. Shahbaz Khan managed to reduce the fort of Duran and attack Siwana. By the end of March 1576, the fort of Siwana had fallen and left Chandrasen as a homeless wanderer.

At the request of his Sardars, he then proceeded to the hills of Piplod. During this time, Rawal Har Rai of Jaisalmer attacked and captured the fort of Porkaran for the Mughals. Chandrasen made attempts to ask Rawal Askaran of Dungarpur for help. However, Askaran had already submitted to the Mughals and refused. Chandrasen was forced to move from one place to another. Rawal Askaran informed the Mughal emperor of this and he appointed Payanda Khan and Sayyid Qasim to punish Chandrasen (1580). Chandrasen by this time was left with just a few hundred loyal companions and was unable to face the imperial army. He was forced to retreat to the mountain defiles of Sarand

Chandrasen made Sojat his capital and rallied his clansmen, using the hills of Sarand to continue his war against the Mughal empire.

== Death and aftermath ==
Chandrasen continued his struggle until his death on 11 January 1581 at Siriari Pass. He was cremated at Saran, where his memorial stone is present. After his death, Marwar was brought under direct Mughal administration until Akbar restored the throne of Marwar to his older full-brother, Udai Singh in August 1583.

Preceded by Maldeo Rathore	Rulers of Marwar (Jodhpur); The Rathore Dynasty; 7 November 1562 – 1581	Succeeded by Udai Singh
