= Battle of Dewair (1606) =

1606 battle between Mewar and Mughals

Battle Of Dewair (1606)
Location	Aravalli hills, 40 km north east of Kumbalgarh
Result	Inconclusive

Belligerents
Kingdom of Mewar	Mughal Empire

Commanders and leaders
Amar Singh I	Parviz Mirza; Asaf Khan III; Sultan Khan †

Strength
15,000–18,000 heavy (stock) cavalry	20,000 cavalry with Parviz and 12,000 cavalry with Asaf Khan III

The battle of Dewair (Dewar) was fought between Amar Singh I of Mewar and Mughal army led by Jahangir under Muhammad Parviz and Asaf Khan III. Shortly after his accession in 1606, Jahangir sent an army of 20,000 cavalry to attack Mewar. Parviz was only the figurative commander while in reality the de facto commander was Jahangir who directed Asaf Khan. Amar led a hard-fought battle to defend his territory, and personally killed the Mughal commander Sultan Khan and his horse by spear which went through both. Reportedly, Asaf Khan retreated from the battlefield. Both Amar and Asaf Khan claimed victory in an inconclusive battle.

== Battle ==
After Jahangir became emperor, he sent his son Parviz Mirza with an army of 20,000 cavalry to conquer Mewar. Parviz was supported by experienced commanders like Asaf Khan, and he was joined by Sagar, a claimant to the throne. Jahangir instructed Parviz not to harm the territory if the local ruler—the Rana—and his eldest son, Karan, came to offer their loyalty. In March 1606, news arrived that Parviz had successfully forced Amar out of Mandal. However, when Khusrsu’s rebellion broke out, Jahangir ordered Parviz to return to the capital, leaving the military campaign to his officers. Before Parviz received the recall order, Amar began negotiations and proposed that one of his younger sons should serve Parviz instead of himself or his eldest son, Kama. Parviz agreed and brought Amar’s younger son, Bagha Singh, to Lahore to meet Jahangir. Yet, nothing significant resulted from Bagha Singh’s visit because shortly afterward, Jahangir appointed Mu‘izz-ul-Mulk Bakshi to lead the army against the Maharana.

== See also ==
- Battle of Haldighati

== Sources ==
- Eraly, Abraham (2004). The Mughal Throne: The Saga of India's Great Emperors. Orion Publishing Group.
- Rana, Bhawan Singh (2005). Maharana Pratap. Diamond Pocket Books.
- Srivastava, Ashirbadi Lal (1986). The Mughal Empire (1526-1803) (8th ed.). Shiva Lal Agarwala & Company.
