= Raj Prashasti =

Sanskrit text and inscription

Raj Prashasti (IAST: Rāja Praśasti; Sanskrit: राज प्रशस्ति) is a Sanskrit text and inscription commemorating the construction of the Rajsamand Lake In Rajasthan in 1676 by Maharana Raj Singh. The text of the Prashasti was authored by Ranchhod Bhatt Tailang at the orders of his patron Raj Singh. It was inscribed on the stone slabs by the order of Maharana Jai Singh in 1687. It is the largest and longest stone inscription in India and is engraved on 25 black stones pillars of the nine outposts at Rajsamand Lake. It states that the Rajsamand Lake was constructed as part of famine relief works. The Prashasti provides historical achievements of Mewar rulers from Bappa Rawal to Raj Singh, details of the construction work, measurements, and costs associated with the Rajsamand lake and dam as well as reports on the rituals performed and gifts and charities donated to the Charanas and Brahmins on the consecration ceremony. The prashasti text was first published in the history of Mewar written by Kaviraja Shyamaldas, in Vir Vinod.

The text Raj Prashasti was composed by Ranchhod Bhatt on the orders of Raj Singh, however, it was Maharana Jai Singh who got the prashasti inscribed on the stone pillars installed at the lake outposts. The text contains 1106 Sanskrit shlokas divided in 24 chapters, which are inscribed on the marble slabs attached to the 25 stone pillars. The first chapter is inscribed on the first 2 pillars, while the rest of the chapters take space of one pillar each.

The largest recipients of gifts and charities were the Brahmins (around 46 thousand in number), second were the Charanas, and third were the various Sardars (thakurs), paswans, and mutsaddis (state officials).

== Vocabulary ==
Raj Prashasti is written completely in the Sanskrit language, but alongside Sanskrit vocabulary, there are also words of Arabic-Persian and Rajasthani language used throughout the text.

== Chapter 1 ==
The first sarga, there are 39 verses.

In the beginning there is 'Mangalashtak' in which there are eight verses in praise of Eklinga, Chatubhuj Hari, Amba, Bala, Ganesh, Surya and Madhusudan. It is written in verses 9-10 that on Saturday 1718 Magh, on the day of Kripa Saptami, Raj Singh started the construction of Rajsamudra. Then he was living in Gogunda village. Ranchod Bhatt, by getting his permission, started the composition of this prashasti on the same day. In the next seven verses, the importance of Sanskrit language, Sanskrit poets and of the prashasti has been described.

In Shloka 19-24, the story of Ekaling Mahatmaya given in under Vayupuran is described. Her eyes filled with tears, Parvati says to Nandi – "Today, I am shedding tears in the separation of Shankar. Because of this prior curse given by me, you will become a king named Vashp. Worshiping Shankar while staying in the Naghrud shrine, you will get a kingdom similar to that of Indra. Then, you will be able to come back to heaven." After this Parveti spoke to a gana named Chand that "Even as a gatekeeper, you did not protect the door today and broke your dignity. That's why you will become a sage named Harit in Medpat. After staying there and worshiping Shankar, you will be able to attain heaven again."

The greatness of Prashasti and the family tree of the poet have been given in the last 27-39 verses.

== Chapter 2 ==
It has 38 verses. In the beginning of the sarga, there is a shloka of praise of Govardhanendra. After this the genealogies of the kings of the Suryavansh is given. At the beginning of creation, the world was watery. Narayan was present there. From his navel, a lotus appeared and from the lotus Brahma appeared. Then the lineage went like this:

-Marichi-Kashyapa Vivasvan Manu - Ikshvaku - Vikshi ( alias - Shashad) - Puranjaya (alias Kakutstha) - Nena- Prithu - Visvarandhi - Chandra-Yuvanasva - Shavasta–Vrihadasva–Kuvalayasva (alias Ghunghumar) - Dridhasva - Hayantra - Nikumbha - Bahrnasva - Kushasva - Sena Jit - Yuvanasva -- Mandhata (alias Trasadrisyu - Purukutsa - Trasadrisyu - Anaranya - Haryasva - Aruna - Tribandhan - Satyavrata (alias Trishanku) - Harichandra - Rohit - Harit - Champa-Sudeva - Vijaya - Bharuk - Vrak-Vahuka - Sagara.

Sagara had sixty thousand sons by his wife Sumati, who created the sea, and Keshini had a son named Asamanjas The order of the lineage of Asamanjasa is as follows:

– Anshuman – Dilip – Bhagiratha – Shruta - Nabha - Sidhudvipa – Ayutayu — Rituparnam – Sarvakama – Sudas - Mitrasah ( alias Kalmapapada) - Ashmaka – Mulaka - Dasaratha – Edvard - Visvasah - Khatwang - Dilip – Raghu - Aj- Dasaratha.

Dasaratha had sons named Rama from his wife Kaushalya, Bharata from Kaikeyi and Lakshmana and Shatrughna from Sumitra. Rama had sons named Kush and Luv from Sita, and Kush had a son named Atithi from Kumudrati. The lineage of the Atithi went like this:

– Nishadha – Nal – Pundarik – Kshemghanva – Devanik – Ahin – Pariyatra – Bal – Sthala – Vajranabh – Sangan – Vidhriti – Hiranyanabha – Pushpa – Dhruvasiddhi – Sudarshan – Agnivarna – Soon – Marut – Prasushruta – Sandhi – - Marshan - - Mahasvan - Vishwamahva - Prasenjit - Takshak - Vrihadval.

Vrihadvala was killed by Abhimanyu in the Mahabharata-battle which is mentioned in the 'Mahabharatagrantha' In the ninth Skanda of the Bhagavata, the lineage order beyond Vrihadbala is given as follows:

- Vrihadrana – Urukriya – Vatsavrddha - Prativyoma - Bhanu -- Divaka - Sahadeva - Vrihadashva – Bhanuman – Pratikasva – Supratika – Marudeva –Sunakshatra - Pushkar - Antariksha – Sutapa — Mitra Jit — Vrihad Bhraj - Varhi – Kritanjaya – Sanjaya --Shakya - Shuddhoda -Langal – Prasenajit – Kshudraka - Runaka – Suratha – Suratha – Sumitra.

The Ikshvaku dynasty continued till Sumitra. These 122 were kings. Then the order of the Sun dynasty is given:

Vajranabh - Maharathi - Atirathi - Achalasena - Kanaksen - Mahasena - Anga - Vijayasena - Ajayasena - Abhangasena - Madasena - Sinharatha.

These kings were residents of Ayodhya. Sinharatha had a son named Vijay. He conquered the kings of the south country and left Ayodhya and started living in the south. There he heard from an Akashvani (prophecy) that he should give up the title of 'Raja' and assume the title of 'Aditya'. The number of rulers who became kings from Manu to Vijay is 135.

== Chapter 3 ==
It has 36 verses. The first verse is devoted to Hari. Then the genealogy of the kings after Vijaya is given which is as follows:

– Padmaditya —- Shivaditya – Haradatta-Sujasaditya ----Sumukhaditya - - Somadatta - Shiladitya – Keshavaditya -Nagaditya – Bhogaditya — Devaditya - Ashaditya - Kalabhojaditya – Grahaditya.

These 14 kings bore the title of 'Aditya'. Descendents of Grahaditya were called Gahilaut. The eldest son of Grahaditya was Vashp.

The Gana Muni of Shiva named Chand became Harit Rashi. Vashp became a disciple of Harit and by his permission, while staying in Nagahradpur, he worshiped the Eklinga Shiva. Pleased, Shiva granted him a boon that he should rule Chitrakoot till his lineage and his lineage shall continue. Vashp died in the month of Magha in the year 919 on the seventh day of Shukla Paksha. Then he was 95 years old.

Vashp was a mighty king. He used to wear a 35 cubits long pattavastra, 16 cubits long nichola and 50 palls of gold kada. His sword was 40 ser in weight. He used to kill two buffaloes in one stroke of the sword. Four big goats were used in his diet. He defeated King Manuraj of Mori dynasty and snatched Chitrakoot from him and established his kingdom there. Then his title was 'Raval'. His lineage went like this:

– Khuman – Govind – Mahendra – Alu – Sinhvarma – Shaktikumar – Shalivahan – Narvahana – Ambaprasad – Kirtivarma – Narvarma – Narpati – Uttam – Bhairav – Sripunjraj – Karnaditya – Bhavsingh – Gotrasingh – Hansraj – Shubhayograj – Vairad – Varisingh – Tej Singh – Samar Singh.

Samar Singh was the husband of Pritha, the sister of Prithviraj. In the war between Prithviraj and Shahabuddin Ghori, he fought on behalf of Prithviraj, and caught Ghori. He was killed in that battle. This war has been described in detail in the text called Rasa.

Karna was the son of Samar Singh. Thus, these became 26 Rawals. Karna had two sons - Mahap and Rahap. Mahap became the king of Dungarpur. Rahap was of a furious nature. With permission from his father, he reached Mandovar and defeated its ruler Mokalsi and captured him and brought him to his father. Karna took the title 'Rana' of Mokalsi and gave it to his son Rahap. Rahap became the king of Chitrakoot and was called Sisodia because of residing in the Sisod village. 'Rana' was his title, which was adopted by the later kings also.

At the end of the canto is the introduction of the poet's lineage.

== Chapter 4 ==
This chapter is completed in 50 verses. In the beginning, there is praise of the Tamalvriksh. Then the next lineage sequence from Rahap is given: -

Narpati - Jaskarna - Nagpal - Punyapal - Prithvimalla - - Bhuvansingh - Bhim Singh - Jaisingh - Laxm Singh.

Laxm Singh was called 'Ghadmadlik'. His younger brother was Ratanasi, who was the husband of Padmini. When Alauddin besieged Chitrakoot for Padmini, Lakshma Singh along with his 12 brothers and 7 sons fought against him and were killed. After this, Lakshma Singh's eldest son Hamir ruled. He installed the black stone-made four-faced pratima of Ekling. Along with this, the idol of Parvati was also consecrated.

Hamir's son was Kshetra Singh and Kshetra Singh's Lakha, who made great charities. Lakha's son was Mokal. For the attaining of moksh for his childless brother Wagah, he built a pond named Baghela in Nagahrid. He also got the wall of the temple of Eklingji constructed. After this, he travelled to Dwarka, and visited a place of pilgrimage called Shankhoddhar. Mokal's son Kumbhakarna was avtar of an Siddha. After Mokal, Kumbhakarna ruled. He had sixteen hundred wives. He built the 'Kumbhalmeru' fort. After Kumbhakarna, his son Raimal became king. Sangram Singh was born to Raimal. Taking two lakh soldiers along with him, he reached Fatehpur in the country of Delhi-ruler Babur and there he made the border of his country till piliya khal. After Sagram Singh, Ratna Singh ascended the throne and then his brother Vikramaditya. After Vikramaditya, his brother Udai Singh ruled. He built a beautiful lake called Udaysagar and established the city of Udaipur. His warriors named Rathor Jaimal, Sisodia Patta and Chauhan Ishwardas fought with the army of Emperor Akbar in Chitrakoot.

After Udai Singh, Pratap Singh ascended the throne. While having a meal with Mansingh Kachwaha, enmity rose between them. Due to this, Man Singh went to Akbar and took the army and reached the village of Khamanor. There was a fierce battle between the two. Man Singh was sitting on an elephant in a seat made of iron. First Pratap's eldest son Amar Singh attacked the elephant with a spear, and later Pratap did too. The elephant ran away from there. Pratap's brother Shakti Singh was on Mansingh's side. Seeing Pratap, he said - "O lord! Look back." Turning back, Pratap saw a horse and he left from there. Man Singh sent two Mughal soldiers after Pratap. Taking Man Singh's permission, Shakti Singh also followed them. Those soldiers reached Pratap but both Pratap and Shakti Singh together killed them.

After that Akbar arrived. He continued battling against Pratap. But considering Pratap's position to be strong, he left for Agra and appointed his eldest son Shekhu in his place. After Akbar, his son Sheikhu became the lord of Delhi by the name of Jahangir. He fought with Pratap. In the end, he left his son Khurram in charge and went back to Delhi after setting up eighty-four Mughal outposts.

Sultan Chakta alias Serim was the uncle of Delhi ruler. Once Pratap spotted him sitting on an elephant in the valley of Diwer, Pratap confronted him. A Solanki-vassal Padihar cut off two legs of the elephant. And Pratap broke his Kumbhsthala with the blow of the spear. When the elephant was killed, Serim rode on the horse. But Amar Singh befell the rider with his attack. While dying, Serim saw Amar Singh and praised his bravery. After this, the Thanet (officers of the Mughal outposts) appointed in places like Kosial etc. left from there. Pratap Singh started living in Udaipur.

Pratap gifted a turban etc. to a Charan (Dursa Arha) who arrived at the Delhi court to visit the Emperor. When he appeared before the emperor, he put the turban tied on his head in his hand and then saluted. On being asked by the king why did you keep the turban in your hand? He replied that this turban was given by Rana Pratap. That's why I didn't let it stay on my head while saluting. Understanding the meaning, the emperor was said to be pleased.

== Chapter 5 ==
In total, there are 52 verses in this sarga.

Amar Singh became the ruler after Pratap Singh. He battled against Khurram and subsequently against Abdullah Khan. Thereafter he was surrounded by twenty-four Thanets (Mughal outpost officers). Then he killed Kayam Khan, the brother of Delhi ruler in Untala village and destroyed Malpur and collected tax from there. Then on the orders of Jahangir, Khurram made a peace treaty with Amar Singh. This treaty was signed in Gogunda. After this, Amar Singh lived in Udaipur and started ruling in peace. He made many great charities.

After Amar Singh, Karan Singh sat on the throne. While in the rank of Kumar, he donated silver on the banks of the Ganges and gave a village to the Brahmins of the Shukar region. When he ascended the throne, he made Akheraj the lord of Sirohi. Khurram had become estranged from his father Jahangir. Karan Singh ordained him in his country and after the death of Jahangir, sending his brother Arjun along with him made him the lord of Delhi. Khurram became famous as Shah Jahan.

Samvat 1664, on the day of Bhadrapada Shukla Dwitiya, Jagat Singh was born from to Karna Singh from his queen Jambuvati. Jambuvati was a Mehecha Rathod, the daughter of Jaswant Singh. Samvat 1685, Jagat Singh became the king on the day of Vaishakh Shukla Tritiya. By his order, his minister Akheraj reached Dungarpur with the army. On his arrival, Rawal Poonja ran away from there. Jagatsingh's soldiers broke his sandalwood gazebo and looted Dungarpur. Thereafter Rathod Ram Singh went towards Devlia with the army. He killed Jaswant Singh and his son Man Singh and looted Devalia.

Samvat 1686, Raj Singh was born to Jagat Singh on Kartik Krishna Dwitiya and a year later a son named Arsi was born. Both these sons were born from the womb of Janade, the daughter of Raj Singh Rathod of Merta. From Maharana's mistress, a son named Mohandas was born to him.

Jagat Singh subdued the lord of Sirohi Akheraj and snatched the land from Toga Walisa, who was defeated by Akheraj. He built a palace named 'Merumandir' for his residence and 'Mohanmandir' on the banks of 'Pichhola' lake.

On his orders, his pradhan Bhagchand reached Banswara with the army. Upon his arrival, Rawal Samarsi, taking his women along with him, took shelter in the mountains. Later, he accepted the suzerainty of Maharana by paying two lakh rupees as a punishment. After this, Jagat Singh married his daughter to Bhavsingh, son of Shatrushalya, the lord of Bundi. On that occasion, another 27 girls were married to Kshatriya princes.

After his ascension, Jagat Singh continued to make Rajat-dana and other donations every year. In the month of Ashadh in Samvat 1704, on the occasion of the solar eclipse, he weighed himself in gold at Amarkantak and gave it away in charity. After this, every year on his birthday, he gave great donations named Kalpavriksha, Swarna Prithvi, Saptsagar and Vishwachakra.

Finally, the list of Maharanas from Udai Singh to Jai Singh has been given.

== Chapter 6 ==
In the month of Margashirsha in Samvat 1709, Raj Singh made Tuladana of silver. In the same year, on the day of Falgun Krishna Dwitiya, he ascended the throne. He married his sister to Anoop Singh, the eldest son of a king named Bhurutiya Karna. On this occasion, 71 daughters of his relatives were married to other Kshatriya princes.

Samvat 1710, on Paush Krishna Ekadashi, from the womb of Rao Indrabhan's daughter Sadakuvari, he had a son named Jai Singh. Apart from this, he had other sons – Bhom Singh, Gaj Singh Suraj Singh, Indra Singh and Bahadur Singh. From his mistress, he had a son names Narayandas.

Raj Singh built a garden named Sarbat Vilas, of which construction had begun when he was a prince.

== Chapter 7 ==
There are 45 verses in this sarga.

In Samvat 1714, on the day of Vaishakh Shukla 10, Raj Singh started the Vijay Yatra. He had a strong military force, with which he gained supremacy over enemy kingdoms which are then listed. On his departure, Anga, Kalinga, Vang, Utkal, Mithila, Gaur, Purab Desh, Lanka, Konkan, Karnataka, Malay, Dravida, Chola, Setubandha, Saurashtra, Kutch, Tatta, Balakh, Kandhar, Uttara Disha, Dariba, Mandal, Phulia, Rahela, Shahpura, Kekri, Sambhar, Jahajpur, Savar, the countries of Gaudas and Kachwahas- Ranthambhor, Fatehpur, Bayana, Ajmer and Toda became terrorized. Dariba city was looted. The warriors of Mandal and Shahpura gave twenty two thousand rupees as a punishment and the rulers of Banera presented twenty thousand rupees to Raj Singh.

At that time Rai Singh was ruling in Toda. Raj Singh sent his chief Fatehchand there with three thousand soldiers and received sixty thousand rupees from Rai Singh as punishment. The same amount of punishment was deposited by Raisingh's mother.

In this Vijaya Yatra, a Su-Bhat of Raj Singh burnt the city of Mahirav of Veeramdev. The soldiers of Maharana plundered Malpura for nine days. After this, by conquering areas named Tonk, Sambhar, Lalsot, and Chatsu, he collected taxes from there.

In Malpura, where Rana Amar Singh could only stay for two hours, Raj Singh stayed there for nine days. He could not move forward due to the flooding of the river named Chhaini and therefore returned to his capital Udaipur.

In the last verse, there is a description of Udaipur decorated on the return of Raj Singh.

== Chapter 8 ==
This sarga is completed in 54 verses.

In the Jyeshtha month of Samvat 1714, Raj Singh was staying in a camp on the banks of the river Chhaini. There he heard the news of Aurangzeb ascending the throne of Delhi. To maintain cordial relations, he then sent his brother Ari Singh to Delhi. Aurangzeb gifted Dungarpur country and elephants to Ari Singh. Ari Singh presented them all to Raj Singh in return. Being pleased, Raj Singh also gave him suitable gifts.

When war broke out between Aurangzeb and his elder brother Shuja in Samvat 1714, Raj Singh sent Kunwar Sardar Singh in aid of Aurangzeb. Sardar Singh was victorious. Aurangzeb also gave him jagirs, horse, elephants etc. On Samvat 1715, Vaishakh Krishna 9, Mangalwar, on the orders of Raj Singh, his minister Fatehchand attacked Banswara. He was accompanied by a cavalry of five thousand thakurs. He made the Banswara ruler Rawal Samar Singh accept Maharana's lordship and took one lakh rupees, deshdana, 2 elephants and ten villages as punishment from him. Raj Singh was pleased and returned ten villages, deshdana and twenty thousand rupees from the said property to Samar Singh.

Thereafter Fatehchand destroyed Devalia. Its ruler Hari Singh ran away. Then Hari Singh's mother reached Fatehchand with her grandson Pratap Singh. Fatehchand accepted their submission and received only twenty thousand rupees and an elephant as a punishment and brought Pratap Singh to the feet of Rana. In Samvat 1716, Raj Singh called Rawal Girdhar of Dungarpur through his Sardars and made him accept his submission. He subdued the lord of Sirohi, Akheraj, peacefully. After this, in the huge valley of Dewari, he built a strong gate, so that the enemies could be stopped. Two big doors and argala were installed in it. There he also got a strong Kot built.

In Samvat 1717, Maharana arrived at Kishangarh with a large army, where he accepted Rathod Roop Singh's daughter, earlier engaged to ruler of Delhi. In Samvat 1719, he subjugated the country of Meval. His army destroyed the land and subjugated Meena soldiers there. Raj Singh gave the entire Meval to his feudatories along with gifts of clothes, horses and a huge amount of money.

In Samvat 1720, Ranawat Ram Singh reached Sirohi with an army at the behest of Rana. There he freed Rao Akheraj, who was imprisoned by his son Udaybhan, and established him again on his kingdom. Samvat 1721, on the day of Margashirsha Shukla, Raj Singh married his daughter Ajaykuvari to Kumar Bhavsingh of Vaghela Raja Anup Singh, the lord of Bandhav. On this occasion, he married 98 daughters of his relatives with other Kshatriya princes. When Maharana sat with the Asparshabhoji Kshatriyas of Bandhav and started having food, they said, "The grain of Rana Raj Singh is the Prasad of Lord Jagannath Rai. That is why it is very holy. By eating it we have become pure." Then Raj Singh provided haya, gaja and ornaments to all the bridegrooms.

On the occasion of the solar eclipse, gold worth thousands of rupees was donated by Maharana. In Samvat 1725, he built a lake at Wadi village and made tuladana and named that lake as Janasagar. On this occasion, he gave villages named Gunhanda and Devpura to his chief priest Garibdas. Six lakh and eighty thousand rupees were spent in the construction of the said lake.

On the same day, Maharajkumar Jai Singh established a lake named 'Rangsagar' in Udaipur with the permission of Maharana and made many donations on that occasion.

== Chapter 9 (Idea of Rajsamudra) ==
The ninth sarga has 48 verses in it.

In the first verse, there is a worship of Lord Krishna. After this the history of the construction of Rajsamudra (Rajsamand) is given.

During the reign of Maharana Jagat Singh, in Samvat 1698, Raj Singh went to Jaisalmer to get married while in the rank of Kumar (prince). At that time he was 12 years old. On his way to Jaisalmer, he thought of building a reservoir there after seeing the tractable land of Dhoyanda, Sanwad, Siwali, Bhigavada, Morchana, Pasud, Khedi, Chhaparkhedi, Tasol, Mandawar, Bhan, Luhana, Bansol, Gudhli, Kankroli and Madha. After ascending the throne, when he went to see Roopnarayan in the Margashirsha of Samvat 1718, he once again saw this land and decided to tie the tractable land. On taking advice, he was told that this work should be done, but it can be done only if there is full faith, no opposition from Delhi, and money is spent abundantly. In reply, Raj Singh said - "These three things can happen."

To start the construction work of Rajsamudra, the Muhurta of Samvat 1718, Magha Krishna 7, Wednesday was chosen.

In the construction of Rajsamudra, first of all an attempt was made to stop the Gomti river and build the Maha Setu (bridge) between the two big mountains. The work of excavation to build the Maha Setu started, in which innumerable people gathered. After the excavation was done, efforts to extract water from there started. All those measures were used which were available in India. Water extraction measures as suggested by the Sutradhars and villagers were also used. The water that came out from there, people carried it from village to village through canals.

On draining the water, on Monday, Samvat 1721, Vaishakh Shukla 13, Raj Singh did the Muhurta to lay the foundation. First of all, Ranchhod Rai, the eldest son of Purohit Garibdas, placed a rock containing five gems there.

On the side of the bridge, white, red and yellow fish and pure Garbhodak came out from the deep surface (patal). Seeing them, the Sutradhars commented that there should be a lot of water here. Raj Singh was pleased to hear the statement of the Sutradhars.

== Chapter 10 (Construction of Rajsamudra) ==
There are 43 verses in this sarga.

Dwarkanath (Krishna) is praised in the first verse. After that the story sequence goes like this.

In Samvat 1726, on the day of Vaishakh Shukla 13, Raj Singh did the Muhurta for the construction of the bridge at Kankroli. Even before Ashadh, due to rain in the month of Jyeshtha, lake was filled with new water. In the same year, on Ashadh Krishna Panchami Sunday, the Sutradhars started filling the ground surface of the main bridge with well-filled stones. They built a strong wall there. This work took them eight years, five months and six days.

Maharana built a unique palace named 'Rajmandir' on the Suvarnashail and entered it in 1726, on the day of Margashirsha Shukla Dashami.

In the same year, on Ashadh Krishna Chaturthi, Muhurta time for Nauka-Sthapan (Boat-entering) was set. But there was not enough water in the lake to float the boat. It was thought that on one hand there is no water in the lake and on the other hand another Muhurta is not coming this year. Not only this, the Muhurta will not come in the next year also due to the presence of Jupiter in the sign of Leo. At this, Ranawat Ram Singh, who was the chief in the construction work of the Rajsamudra dam, said - "The muhurta of setting up the boat can be done by filling more water in the lake." Maharana also took a vow to establish the boat at the said time. It rained on the day of Tritiya, in the second prahar, and Raj Singh embarked on the boat in due time of Muhurta.

In Samvat 1728, on the full moon of the month of Jyeshtha, the Sutradhars closed the mouth of the drain on the orders of Raj Singh.

On Samvat 1729, Falgun Krishna 11, Raj Singh got the muhurta of Sangikarya performed on the main bridge. On the day of Jyeshtha Shukla Saptami, he built a beautiful and strong wall on the lake named 'Indrasagar' near Eklingji, in which four plates were kept. Eighteen thousand rupees were spent on this work. On the orders of Maharana, Ranchod Bhatt composed a prashasti, hearing which he ordered it to be carved on the rock.

== Chapter 11 (Measurements) ==
There are 57 verses in this sarga, in which the bridges of Rajsamudra are described.

Various Setu (bridges) and dams are mentioned along with their measurements such as Mukhya Setu, Nimba Setu, Bhadra Setu, Kankroli Setu, Asotiya Setu, and Vansol Setu.

According to the Prashasti, the length of the foundation from east to west is 515 yards, whereas at the top it is 585 yards. The width of the foundation below the earth is given as 55 yards, and that of the top, it is 10 yards. The depth of the foundation is 22 yards, and from above the surface to the top, it is 35 yards in height. Thus, we learn that from top of the foundation rises a block of masonry to a height of 8 yards which serves as plinth of the structure. From here three bastions (mekhlas) were constructed, their plinth going up to 11/2 yards, rising further up to 121/2 yards. Finally, four columns, 13 yards in height emerge as the part of the structure.

== Chapter 12 ==
This sarga has 41 verses.

There are three Otas on the bridge built on the side of the village of Vansol. The length, breadth and height of the first Ota are 250, 90 and 111 yards respectively. The second Ota is similar to the first Ota in length and breadth. The height is 211 yards. The third Ota is 300 yards in length and 90 yards in extension. Its height is 2 yards. There are three pavilions built there.

In the west, bordering the village of Morchana, there is a hill within the lake, with a mandapa on its top. There is another mandapa with six pillars. Thus the total number of mandapas is 29.

The villages of Siwali, Bhigavada, Bhan, Luhana, Vansol and Gudhli, Pasund, Khedi, Chhaparkhedi, Tasol, and Mandavar villages, and the reservoirs of Kankroli, Luhana and Siwali, Nipan, Vapi and Kupa, which are 30 in number, were submerged to form the Rajsamudra. Three rivers have fallen in this lake - the river of Gomti, Taal and Kelwa. The total length of the bridge is 6493 yards. According to Galayoga, the Sutradhars have given its length as eight thousand yards. According to Vishwakarma, the length of Tadag is at most six thousand yards. There is doubt that someone might have built such a long lake on this basis. Thus, Raj Singh has created seven thousand yards long reservoir.

There are 12 chambers on the bridge of Rajsamudra. A total of 48 mandapas were built here, some of which were of cloth, some of wood and some of stone. Of them now only two pavilions made of stone remain.

In the month of Bhadrapada in Samvat 1730, due to flooding in the river Taal, many houses of the region were submerged and destroyed. In the same year in Ashwin month, in the middle of the night, river Gomti too flooded. It is said that water rose to height of ‘eight hands’ in the Rajsamudra. The water was stored in the lake.

In Samvat 1731, decorated beautiful boats were cast in Rajsamudra on Shravan Shukla 5. On this occasion, to see the boats in the lake, Sutradhars of Lahore, Gujarat and Surat came.

== Chapter 13 (Invitations for the ceremony) ==
After the construction of Rajsamudra, Raj Singh invited the kings, Durgadhipatis (fort owners) and rulers related to him on the occasion of the completion and sent horses, chariot palanquins, and elephants to bring them. Trusted messengers including Charanas and Brahmins were sent to invite them. A large collection of clothes, jewellery, gems, coins, pots, musk etc. were stored in abundance to later gift them to guests. Proper arrangement of resources was made. There was a market for food grains and camps for different types of items were built there. Food items were arranged. Elephants, horses and chariots were collected to be donated by Raj Singh. He bought 19 elephants from the merchants for this purpose.

The invited kings arrived with their families. Their horses, elephants and chariots filled the whole city. On the occasion, great poets and scholars including Charanas, many learned Brahmins and Bhats and other poets were also invited.

The invitees who arrived presented gifts, Maharana kept some of them returned the rest. In Samvat 1732, only on Shukla Dwitiya, the queen of Raj Singh, Shri Ramrasade, built Vapika in the valley of Dewari. 24 thousand rupees were spent in the construction of this Vapi.

Maharana ordered the Sutradhars to prepare three pavilions on the bridge of Rajsamudra. One pavilion was built for the prathista of the lake and the remaining two were for Suvarga–Tuladan and Haataka-Saptsagardan. The Muhurta for the prathista of the reservoir was chosen- Samvat 1732, Magh Shukla 10 Saturday. Prior to this, on Magh Shukla 5, he followed rituals according to the Matsya Purana, and selected 26 Ritvijas.

== Chapter 14 (Mandapas for Tuladana) ==
There are 40 verses in this sarga.

The queen of Raj Singh was Sadakuvari. She was the daughter of Parmar Rao Indrabhan. When Sadakuvari expressed her wish to perform silver-tuladan, an pavilion was built overnight for the purpose.

Two pavilions were built for donating gold and silver by Purohit Garibdas and his son.

The wife of Bhim Singh, son of Rana Amar Singh, also decided to donate silver-tuladan. Another pavilion was built.

Kaviraja Barhat Kesari Singh decided to donate silver-tuladan. Thus, he also got a beautiful pavilion constructed near Khadarvatika on the bridge-bank.

Ramchandra was the son of Rao Ballu Chauhan of Bedla. His second son's name was Kesari Singh, whom Raj Singh made as the Rao of Sanluvar. He consulted his brother Rao Sabal Singh who said that he has been made Rao by Raj Singh. That's why he should also donate. Hearing this, Kesari Singh Chauhan prepared. He also built a pavilion.

In the same year, on the day of Magh Shukla 7, the queen of Raj Singh, daughter of Rathod Roop Singh, got a Vapika established in Rajnagar. 30 thousand rupees were spent on the construction work of this Vapika. On the day of Navami, Raj Singh arrived at the pavilion with the priest. On the first day, he followed a fast and performed Swastivachan. Then he worshipped Prithvi, Ganesha, Kuldevi and Govind.

After that Maharana gave dakshina to the Brahmins. Garibdas received clothes, kundals, gem-studded rings and angadas, gold yagyopavit, various kinds of jewels, golden water-pots and food-pots. To other Brahmins, Maharana gave many gold ornaments, gem-studded rings, silver vessels and sufficient clothes.

== Chapter 15 (Naming of the lake) ==
After this, Raj Singh travelled on the river boat with great pomp, and reached the pavilion and started the worship. After a Ratri-Jagaran, he reached the pavilion the next day. He called all his kinsmen, the wives and the queens of the kings and gave them seats there to see the prathshita. Alongside his chief queen, he worshipped gods like Varuna etc.

Maharana, with the desire to make Rajsamudra the second Ratnakar, put nine gems in it and left Matsya, Kachhap and Makar in the lake. Later he performed of go-taran with the help of Ritvijas. After the go-taran, he selected two names for the lake - 'Rajsagar' as the official and 'Rajsamudra' as its alias. Five days later the reservoir was named at an auspicious time.

The Ritvijas recited the Homa, the Vedas, in the Mahamandapa; performed chanting, etc. Maharana took a sankalpa (resolve) to circumambulate Rajsamudra.

== Chapter 16 (Parikrama) ==
There are 60 verses in this sarga.

Maharana Udai Singh had established Udaysagar on Vaishakh Shukla Tritiya in 1622.

Thus, they prepared to circumambulate the entire lake with great pomp. All of his queens accompanied the Maharana. Stripes of clothes were laid on the route for him to walk comfortably but he had them removed. Instead, Raj Singh also took off his shoes and walked barefoot.

He started the circumambulation of Rajsamudra from the right side. During circumambulation, he gave away gifts to those who met him on the route. It was raining at the time. Raj Singh's younger brother Ari Singh was also walking alongside. Seeing him tired, Maharana excused him and his wife to rest in the palanquin. After completing the circumambulation, Raj Singh put all the flower garlands he had received while doing circumambulation, into the Rajsamudra. Rajasamudra is 14 kos long and wide. During circumambulation, five camps were set up along the way.

Maharana satisfied all the people who gathered on that occasion with food, money, clothes etc. Thereafter, he made the domicile on the day of Chaturdashi, before donating gold-Tuladan and Saptsagardan. Both the pavilions were decorated. He worshiped Prithvi, Vishnu, Ganesha, and Vastu, and chose the priests and the Ritvijas. Afterwards, Havan, worship, Veda-recitation etc. took place. Maharana reached his camp in a palanquin. Today was the sixth day of his fast. He had some fruits. Later, he ordered to start preparations for the pratishtha of Rajsamudra.

== Chapter 17 ==
This sarga contains 41 verses.

After this, on the full moon day, Raj Singh reached the pavilion with his queen. His brother named Ari Singh, his sons named Jai Singh, Bhim Singh, Gaj Singh, Suraj Singh, Indra Singh, Bahadur Singh, Amar Singh, Ajav Singh etc. his grandsons; Manohar Singh, Dalsingh, Narayan Das; Purohit Ranchhodrai, Bhikhu, his ministers etc. There were also many Kshatriyas and Thakurs present. Required offerings were made in the havan and the pratishtha was completed with all the rituals.

Then he reached the pavilion for the donation of the Suvarna-Saptasagar along with his family. There he performed all the deeds for the sake of the said charity. The seven kundas of Brahma, Krishna, Mahesh, Surya, Indra, Rama and Gauri were donated.

Next was Tuladana, where Raj Singh weighed himself against gold and donate it to charity. When he mounted on the Tula, he asked the maidservants to run and bring the baskets full of gold coins. Much gold was placed on the scale. In the end, Raj Singh's scale remained high. The total weight of gold was twenty-two thousand tolas. Raj Singh had also seated his eldest son Amar Singh with him on the scale. In Tuladan, he donated villages, elephants, horses, lands, cows etc.

== Chapter 18 (Day of Tuladana) ==
There are 40 verses in this sarga.

On the occasion of the consecration of Rajsamudra, Raj Singh gave the following 12 villages to his priest Garibdas: Ghasa, Gudha, Sirthal, Salol, Alod, Majjhera, Dhaneria, Amberi, Jharsadari, Usrol, Asana and Bhava. Apart from these villages, he gave many other villages and many fertile lands to other Brahmins.

After this, the queen of Raj Singh duly hoisted the balance and made the donation of silver-tuladana. Garibdas weighed himself against gold and his son Rannchhor Rai against silver and donated. Apart from these, the mother of Raja Raisingh of Toda, Rao Kesari Singh Chauhan of Salumbar and Kaviraja Kesari Singh Barhat weighed themselves against silver coins and donated the amount in charity.

In Shlok 26-27, the poet Ranchhod Bhatt has referred to Raj Singh as Shripati (i.e. Krishna) and called himself Sudama and pleads with him for wealth.

== Chapter 19 (Charities and gifts) ==
There are 43 verses in this sarga. In the beginning, 21 verses mainly describe Rajasamudra. Afterwards, the sequence is as follows:

Gada Mandal was built outside Rajnagar. There, Charanas and numerous Brahmins arrived from different regions. The amount of charity of Saptsagardan and Tuladan of Raj Singh was donated. The amount of the chief queen's tuladan, of the priest Garibdas and of his son Ranchhod Rai was also distributed among those Brahmins. Maharana also donated food on that occasion.

Subsequently, Raj Singh, in the assembly hall, gave gold, rupees, jewellery, zareen clothes, elephants, horses and village copper plates to the Charanas, the Brahmins, the Yachakas and all other people.

After this, he gave clothes, horses, elephants, gems and ornaments to all the kings who had come after receiving invitations, all the Brahmins and Vaishyas etc. and permitted them to return to their lands. He sent clothes, elephants, horses and ornaments for the invited kings, Durgadhipas, kinsmen, and his relatives.

== Chapter 20 (Charities and gifts) ==
There are 55 verses in this sarga.

Raj Singh sent one elephant, two horses, and zareen clothes each to Raja Jaswant Singh Rathod of Jodhpur, Ram Singh Kachwaha of Amber, Anoop Singh of Bikaner, Bhavsingh Hada of Bundi, Chandrawat Mohkam Singh of Rampura, Rawal Amar Singh Bhati of Jaisalmer and Bhav Singh of Bandhav. These elephants and horses were worth Rs 78526.

An elephant and Zareen clothes worth Rs.6500 were sent to Rawal Jaswant Singh of Dungarpur. Earlier, on the occasion of the consecration of Rajasamudra, Maharana had given him Zareen clothes and two horses worth 1,500 rupees.

For the princes of Toda's ruler Raisingh, his mother was given an elephant, whose value was three thousand rupees. 28 horses worth Rs. 8311 were gifted to the invited kings.

Maharana gave one elephant and zareen clothes to his chief Bhikhu Dosi and Ranawat Ram Singh. These elephants were worth 11000 and 7000 rupees respectively. He gifted 61 horses worth Rs. Rs 25551 to other Thakurs and Sardars.

To the Charan sardars holding sasan-jagirs, Maharana gifted 200 horses worth 13136 rupees and to the other Charanas he gave away 206 horses worth 27571 rupees. To the pundits and the Charan poets, he gave 13 elephants worth 122268 rupees.

Thereafter, the poet provides a long list of jagirs and land-grants of the Charanas granted by various rulers ranging from Jagat Singh, Karan Singh, Amar Singh, Maharana Pratap Singh, Udai Singh, Vikramaditya Singh, Ratansi, Rana Sanga (Sangram Singh), Rana Raimal, Khetsi, Ajesi and Samarsi.

== Chapter 21 (Cost of construction) ==
There are 45 verses in this sarga.

At the beginning of this sarga, there is a description of the money spent on the construction of Rajsamudra. Rs. 1,51,72,233 were spent on its construction work and its pratishtha.

In Samvat 1734, on the occasion of his birthday, Raja Singh gave two great donations - Kalpadrum and Hiranyashva. In the first, 200 pals and in the second, 80 tolas of gold was used. In the same year, while going to bhilwara in Shravan, he made Rao Varisal the Raja of Sirohi accepted one lakh rupees and five villages like Korta from him. When a gold-urn of Maharana was stolen in Sirohi, he recovered 50 thousand rupees from Varishal for the urn.

In Shloka 34-41, the glory of Raj Singh's valor and charity has been described by the poet.

== Chapter 22 (Conflict with Aurangzeb) ==
The verses in this sarga are 50.

In Samvat 1735, Chaitra Shukla 11, Maharajkumar Jai Singh went to Ajmer by order of Raj Singh. From there, he went on to Delhi and met Aurangzeb. This meeting took place in a camp, two kos outside Delhi. Aurangzeb felicitated him with a garland of pearls, Urobhusha, Zareen clothes, an ornate elephant and many horses. Similarly, he gave zareen clothes and horses to Chandrasen Jhala and Purohit Garibadas and appropriate gifts to other Thakurs who accompanied them.

Afterwards, Jai Singh went for a darshan of Ganyuktesvar Shiva temple and took a bath on the banks of the Ganga and donated silver-tuladan. He also donated an elephant and a horse. Later, he travelled to Vrindavan and Mathura and arrived back in Udaipur in Jyeshtha month.

In Samvat 1736, Aurangzeb arrived in Mewar on the day of Paush Krishna Ekadashi. Prior to this, his son Akbar and commander Tahavvar Khan had already made camps in the palace of Rajnagar with their army. There his soldiers committed atrocities. Sakta, the son of Sabal Singh Puravat, fought against them. One Chundavat and twenty other warriors were killed in this battle.

Then Maharana ordered the Rajputs to reach the valley of Dewari with determination to fight along with cannons and ammunition. Aurangzeb also came to the valley of Dewari and stayed there for 21 days after demolishing its gate. It is said that once he went to Udaipur hiding in the night. Akbar and Tahavwar Khan also came to Udaipur.

From there, Akbar proceeded towards Eklingji. But he returned to his camp after encountering the forces at the ghats of Anderi and Cheerwa. Jhala Pratap Singh of Kargetpur snatched two elephants from the royal army and presented them to Maharana. The Balla people of Bhadesar caught many elephants, horses and camels from the emperor's army and presented them to the Maharana. Maharana was then staying in Nainwara. In this way, with around 50 thousand people killed, Aurangzeb reached Chitrakoot by an alternate route. Prince Akbar and Hasan Ali Khan too arrived there through 'Chappan' region.

While Aurangzeb left for Chitrakoot, Raj Singh went towards the Nai village. He immediately sent Kunwar Bhim Singh from Kotri village to Idar with the army who destroyed the region. Syed Shah fled from there. Then he looted Vadnagar and recovered 40 thousand rupees as punishment and reached Ahmednagar, where he looted goods worth two lakh rupees. Aurangzeb had demolished many temples in Mewar. Bhim Singh took his revenge by demolishing one big and three hundred small mosques throughout Ahmednagar.

Maharana permitted Jai Singh to attack Chitrakoot to conquer the enemy. He was accompanied by Jhala Chandrasen, commander Sabal Singh Chauhan and his brother Rao Kesari Singh, Gopi Nath Rathod, Arisingh's son Bhagwant Singh and thirteen thousand cavalry and twenty thousand foot soldiers in addition to other chieftains. The Mewar chieftains fought throughout the night. One thousand soldiers of the royal army, three elephants and many horses were killed in that battle. Akbar fled from there. The Rajput warriors brought fifty horses from the royal army and presented them to Jai Singh. Jai Singh then returned to Maharana.

Kunwar Ganga, the son of Kesari Singh Shaktawat, brought 18 elephants, many horses and camels from the royal army and presented them to Maharana.

Maharana again sent Kuwar Bhim Singh with the army. He crossed the canal of Desuri and fought a fierce battle against Akbar and Tahavvar Khan in the city of Ghanora. Bika Solanki fought to protect the ghats. On the orders of Maharana, Kunwar Gaj Singh also arrived at Begu with the army destroyed it.

Finally, Aurangzeb made a treaty with the Maharana by paying three lakh rupees.

== Chapter 23 ==
This sarga has 62 verses.

In Samvat 1737, Maharana Raj Singh passed away on the day of Kartik Shukla Dashami. 15 days later, Jai Singh was crowned in a city named Kuraj.

In the Margashirsha of 1737, at Kuraj, Jai Singh received news that Tahavvar Khan had rafte returned crossing the canal of Desuri. Jai Singh sent his brother Bhim Singh to fight. Bika Solanki also accompanied him. Together they destroyed the enemy army. Tahavvar Khan was surrounded from all sides. He ran away after eight days.

Maharana advanced near Ghanora and Dalel Khan went in the hills of Chappan region. Maharana's soldiers gave way and let Dalel Khan move forward. When he reached the ghats of Gogunda, Raj Singh closed all the ghats. Rawat Ratansi was present at one of the ghats. He did not allow Dalel Khan to leave. Jai Singh then sent Jhala Versa to make a treaty. Versa told Dalel Khan that you was a respected person of the emperor. You have 15,000 horsemen with you. Still, one Rajput Rawat Ratansi has caged you. But, as Maharana has affection for you, you have been allowed to enter till now. If you want to leave, you can leave and if you want to stay, you can stay.

On this, the Mughal Nawab replied that he has consult with his soldiers who are coming behind him. Before this, Dalel Khan had sent some of his men to check the routes of the three Ghats. They returned and reported that all the three ghats are closed. So when he could not leave from there, he bribed a local Brahmin with 1000 rupees to find out another route. Thus, he tried to escape in the night by some alternate route. But there too, Rawat Ratansi had arrived with his army who attacked the running Mughal soldiers. However, Dalel Khan was able to escape.

Running away by deceit, Dalel Khan reached Delhi. On being asked by the emperor why did he come running away and not attack the Rana, he replied that he did not get any food there. Maharana had come to kill me. He killed many of my soldiers. Fourteen hundred of my soldiers would die due to hunger. That's why I ran away from there. Hearing this, the emperor panicked. Thereafter, Mughal prince Akbar was sent to make a treaty with the Maharana. Shyam Singh, son of Garibdas, the second son of Rana Karan Singh, met him. He talked about the treaty with Rana and after confirming it, he returned. Dalel Khan and Hasan Ali Khan made preparations for the treaty.

== Chapter 24 ==
This is the last chapter of this poem. It has 36 verses. In the beginning, there is a description of the toranas (pylons) made by Maharana Raj Singh, grandson Amar Singh, Patrani Sadakuvari, Purohit Garibdas and his son Ranchhodrai. These toranas are built on the pal of Rajsamudra. Later, the importance and excellence of Rajaprashasti is described.

Shloka 25-27 describes the valor of Dayaldas. He had destroyed Khairawad and looted Banera. By destroying Dharapuri, he had demolished the mosque there. Ahmednagar was also looted and destroyed by him. He had also demolished the grand mosque there. After this, the charity of Hiramani Mishra is described in five verses.

In the end, there are two sorthas praising Raj Singh, which are in Mewari language.

== See also ==
- Rajsamand Lake
- Raj Singh
