= Jai Singh of Mewar =

Maharana of Mewar from 1680 to 1698

- Maharana of Mewar
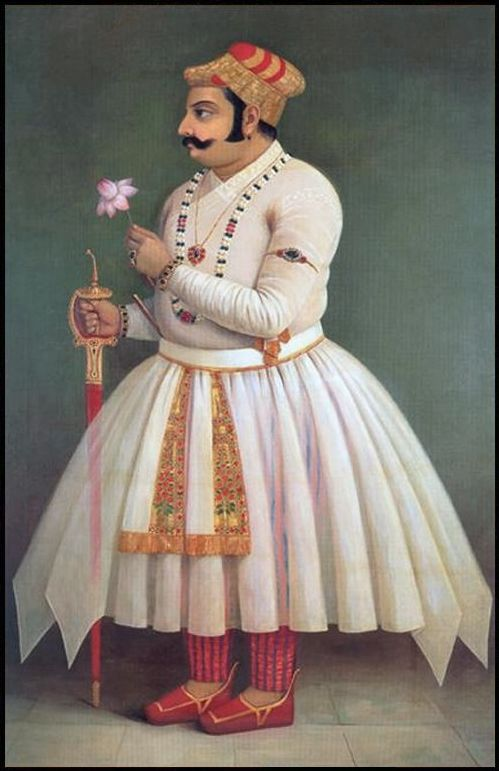
- Jai Singh

Maharana of Mewar
- Reign: 22 October 1680 – 23 September 1698
- Predecessor: Raj Singh I
- Successor: Amar Singh II
- Born: 5 December 1653
- Died: 23 September 1698 (aged 44)
- Spouse: Rathorji Anup Kanwarji of Idar Chauhanji Roop Kanwarji of Bedla in Mewar Rathorji Bhagwat Kanwarji of Bhinai in Ajmer Hadiji Ganga Kanwarji of Bundi Jhaliji Phool Kanwarji of Bari Sadri in Mewar Devadiji Dev Kanwarji of Sirohi Chauhanji Swarup Kanwarji of Kotharia in Mewar Jhaliji Sujan Kanwarji of Delwara in Mewar Hadiji Bishan Kanwarji of Bhajneri in Bundi Rathorji Anand Kanwarji of Chavand in Mewar
- Issue: Amar Singh II Bhim Singh Udai Singh Pratap Singh Takht Singh Umaid Singh Kishan Kanwarji m.to Rao Bhim Singh I of Kota Umaid Kanwarji m.to Rao Budh Singh of Bundi Suraj Kanwarji m.to Yuvraj Jagat Singh of Jaisalmer Anup Kanwarji m.to Rana Dalel Singh of Gangdhar
- Dynasty: Sisodias of Mewar
- Father: Raj Singh I
- Mother: Parmarji Ramras Kanwarji d.of Rao Indrabhan Singh of Bijolia in Mewar

Maharana Jai Singh (5 December 1653 – 23 September 1698), was the Sisodia Rajput Maharana of the Kingdom of Mewar, reigned for 1680 to 1698. He was the eldest son of Maharana Raj Singh I. Jai Singh was involved the military conflicts against the Mughal Emperor Aurangzeb. He is also known for building the Dhebar lake (also known as Jaisamand).

== Conflicts with the Mughals ==
=== Treaty and territorial concessions ===
Unlike his predecessors, Jai Singh opted for diplomacy to maintain peace with the Mughals. He signed a treaty with Aurangzeb in 1681, conceding three districts and agreeing to a tribute in exchange for a cessation of hostilities. This decision, however, was met with disapproval from a faction within Mewar, who believed it compromised their sovereignty.

=== Military engagements ===
Jai Singh was posted in the hills near Girwa by his father Raj Singh I, to encounter the invading Mughal army in 1679. In 1680, Aurangzeb left Mewar and reached Ajmer after the occupation of Udaipur, Chittor and the destruction of several villages and temples. Jai Singh with a strong army conducted a surprise attack on Chittor and caused heavy casualties in the Mughal army. The resistance, energy and night raids of Rajputs made it difficult for the Mughal outposts to maintain their position.

Despite the treaty, skirmishes and military confrontations between Mewar and the Mughal forces continued throughout Jai Singh's reign. In 1681, it is claimed that he successfully captured the strategically significant fort of Mandalgarh from the Mughals. However, neither side was able to achieve a decisive victory in the prolonged conflict.
