= Sangram Singh II =

Maharana of Mewar from 1710 to 1734

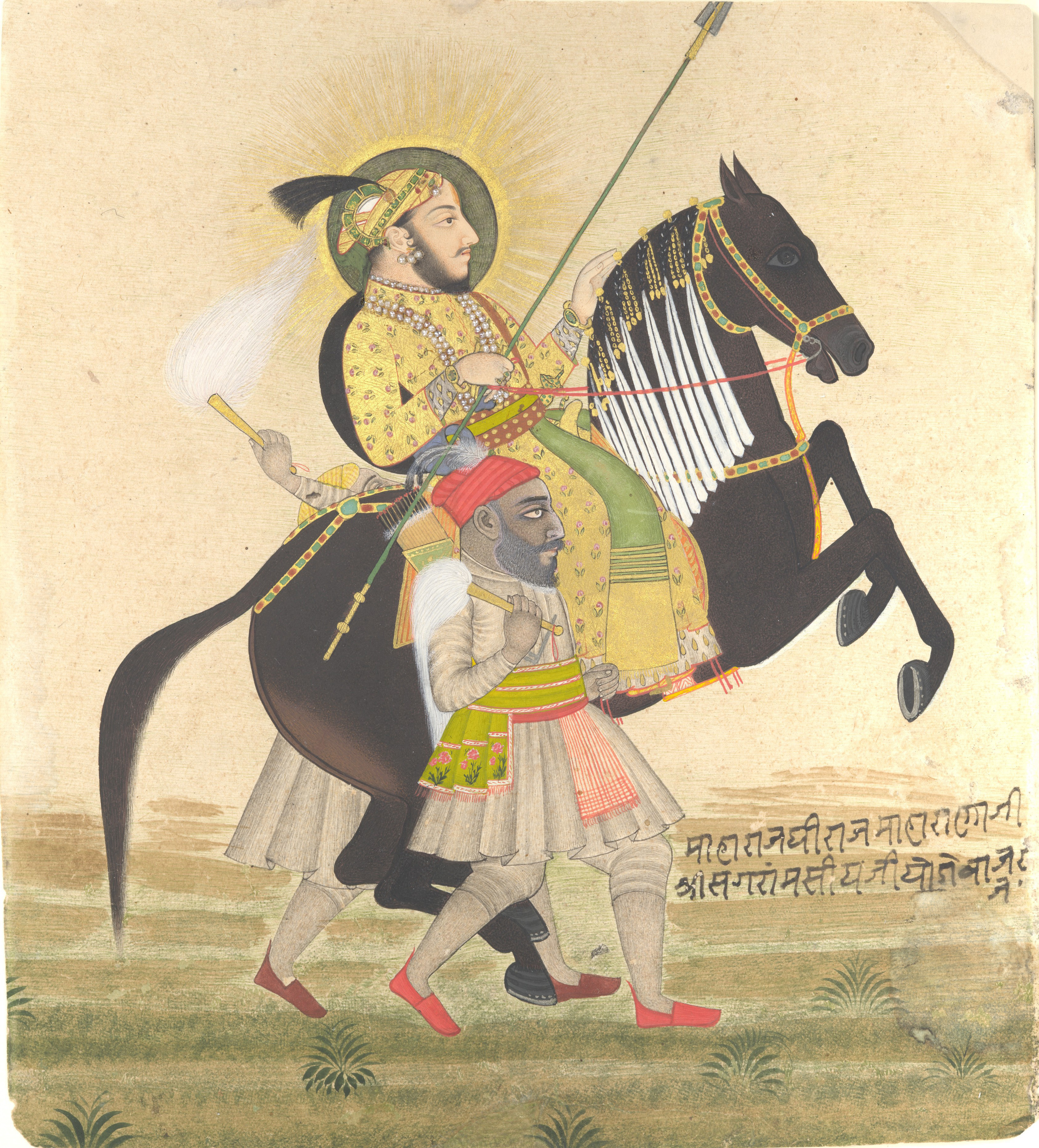
- Maharana Sangram Singh Riding a Prize Stallion, c. 1712

Rana of Mewar
- Reign: 10 December 1710 – 11 January 1734
- Predecessor: Amar Singh II
- Successor: Jagat Singh II
- Born: 24 March 1690
- Died: 11 January 1734 (aged 43)
- Spouse: Bhatiyaniji Badan Kanwarji of Jaisalmer Parmarji Umaid Kanwarji of Bambori in Mewar Rathorji Kishan Kanwarji of Bhinai in Ajmer Chauhanji Ram Kanwarji of Kotharia in Mewar Jhaliji Yash Kanwarji of Lakhtar in Gujarat Rathorji Maha Kanwarji of Idar in Gujarat Rathorji Kushal Kanwarji of Sadri in Mewar Khichanji Guman Kanwarji of Raghogarh in Malwa Solankiniji Ratan Kanwarji of Lunawada in Gujarat Jhaliji Kundan Kanwarji of Bari Sadri in Mewar
- Issue: Jagat Singh II Nath Singh Bagh Singh Arjun Singh Braj Kanwarji (m. Maharao Durjan Sal of Kota State) Saubhag Kanwarji (marriage not known) Roop Kanwarji (marriage not known)
- Dynasty: Sisodias of Mewar
- Father: Amar Singh II
- Mother: Chauhanji Dev Kanwarji d.of Rao Sabal Singh of Bedla in Mewar

Maharana Sangram Singh II (24 March 1690 – 11 January 1734) was the Sisodia Rajput ruler of Kingdom of Mewar. He reigned from 1710 to 1734. He was succeeded by his eldest son Jagat Singh II.

Maharana Sangram Singh II was a noted political figure of his time. He ascended the throne at a crucial juncture in Indian history when the Mughal Empire was disintegrating and dividing into various independent parts with several announcing themselves free from the Mughal rule. At the same time, Mewar was facing internal feuds because of which their chance to expand their territory was also minimal. This scenario led Mewar into a defensive stance against the Mughals. With gradual disintegration of the Mughal Empire, the need for this vigilance toward them declined. Nevertheless, even as the Mughals waned, the Rajputs, in Mewar as elsewhere, faced the upsurge of the Marathas, so continued their fortification strategy to safeguard and strengthen their territory.

== Mughal invasion ==
Soon after his accession, Mewar faced an invasion by Ranbaz Khan Mewati in 1711 CE, who was granted the Pargana of Pur Mandal by the Mughal Emperor Bahadur Shah I. Sangram Singh II mobilized a large army to counter him. Rajput forces faced Ranbaz Khan near the Khari river. The battle is known as Battle of Bandanwara, in which Ranbaz Khan was defeated and killed.

== Later reign ==
During this time in the Indian history, Maharana Sangram Singh II wisely reigned Mewar to a prosperous and peaceful province. He was cautious of the needs of his countrymen and steadily steered Mewar towards efficient financial and state affairs. During his rule, the Sisodia dynasty branched into three sections with his sons heading each section and establishing growth of Mewar everywhere. Emperor Farukhsiyar, the Mughal ruler during his reign, granted him his own coinage. Art and craft of Mewar re-flourished under him with peace and prosperity. He recaptured various lost territories of Mewar expanding his kingdom.

Leading his kingdom towards opulence, his death marked the downslide of Rajputana rule along with the decline of the Mughal Empire and the emergence of the Maratha power during the reign of his son and successor Maharana Jagat Singh II.
