= Battle of Bandanwara =

Mughal-Rajput Wars

- Part of Mughal-Rajput Wars
Date	1711 AD
Location	Bandanwara (In present day Ajmer district of Rajasthan, India)
Result	Rajput victory

Belligerents
Kingdom of Mewar	Mughal Empire

Commanders and leaders
Sangram Singh II; Umaid Singh of Shahpura; Devbhan Chauhan of Kotharia; Surajmal Solanki of Desuri; Rawat Sangram Singh of Deogarh; Jai Singh of Badnor (WIA); Rawat Gangdas of Baansi; Samant Singh of Salumbar (WIA); Fatehsingh Mungona of Ujjaini; Rawat Maha Singh of Kanore	Bahadur Shah I Ranzbaz Khan Mewati †; Nahar Khan †; Mir Bakhshi Zulfikar Khan

Casualties and losses
Light	Heavy

Battle of Bandanwara was fought between the Kingdom of Mewar and Mughals in 1711 CE at Bandanwara, near Khari river in Bhilwara district, Rajasthan, India.

== Background ==
Maharana Amar Singh II had captured Mandalgarh, Badnore and Pur Mandal after death of Aurangzeb. But Mughals had not granted any written deeds for these Parganas. After death of Maharana Amar Singh II, Bahadur Shah granted Pur Mandal to Ranbaz Khan Mewati in Feb-March, 1711 AD. Ranbaz Khan moved with his own army, along with 5-7 thousand-strong force sent by Mir Bakhshi Zulfikar Khan, to take control of the territory.

== Preparation ==
News of invasion reached Udaipur and Maharana Sangram Singh - II dispatched a large army, consisting of various chiefs of Mewar:

- Devbhan Chauhan of Kotharia
- Umaid Singh of Shahpura
- Jai Singh of Badnor
- Rawat Maha Singh of कानोड़
- Rawat Surat Singh, brother of Rawat Maha Singh
- Rawat Sangram Singh of Deogarh
- Samant Singh of Salumbar
- Surajmal Solanki of Desuri
- Rawat Gangdas of Baansi
- Suraj Singh Rathore of Limara
- Devi Singh Chundawat of Begun
- Hathi Singh Dodiya
- Prithviraj Chundwat of Amet
- Sahab Singh Rathore, ancestor of Rathores of Rupaheli
- Surat Singh Mertiya of Ghanerao
- Kothari Bhim Singh of Begun

== Battle ==
Mughal and Mewari forces met near Khari river. Mughal forces had archers on elephants and horses. Attack of Mewar forces was so quick, that the Mughal archers could draw only once and the Mewar cavalry reached very near and hand-to-hand combat ensued. Maha Singh of Kanore fell in the battle, Jai Singh of Badnore and Samant Singh of Salumbar were wounded in the battle. Rao of Begun had sent his Kamdar, Kothari Bhim Singh of Begun, who fought on the battlefield of Bandanwara with great vehemence and vigour, he fell in the battle fighting bravely. Ranzbaz Khan, along with his brother Nahar Khan and other close relatives, were killed in the battle. Mughal forces suffered massive casualties and were defeated. Deendar Khan fled with remaining army to Ajmer, his camp was captured by Mewari forces. With this battle, Mewar succeeded to retain its control on this territory.

Mewar Bhupal Infantry(currently known as 9th Grenadiers (Mewar), had the Battle of Bandanwara (1711) listed on its state forces colours, before it was merged into Indian Army.
