= Jagat Singh I =

Maharana of Mewar from 1628 to 1652

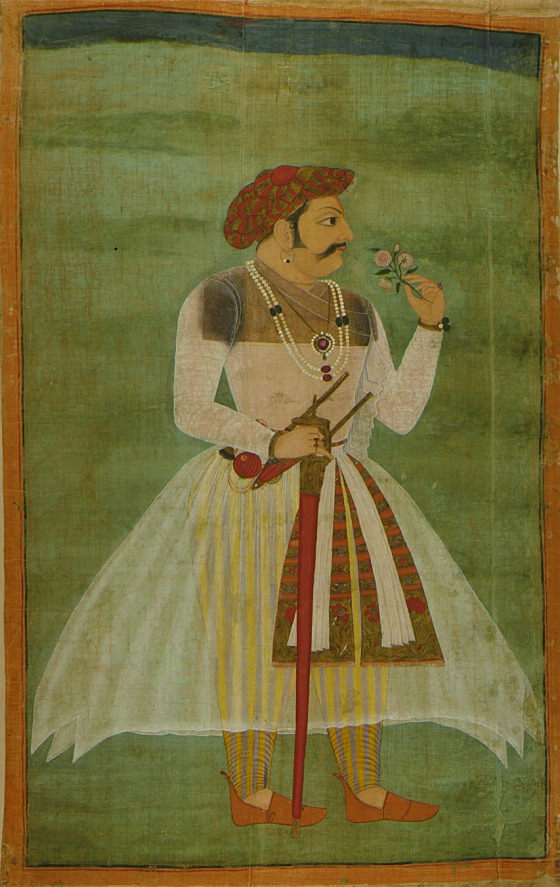
- 18th century portrait of Jagat Singh I

Rana of Mewar
- Reign: March 1628 – 10 April 1652
- Predecessor: Karan Singh II
- Successor: Raj Singh I
- Born: 1607
- Died: 10 April 1652 (aged 44–45)
- Spouse: List: Rathorji Jagroop Kanwarji of Idar Rathorji Sujan Kanwarji of Chavand in Mewar Chauhanji Kanak Kanwarji of Bedla in Mewar Hadiji Sada Kanwarji of Bundi Chauhanji Anup Kanwarji of Kotharia in Mewar Rathorji (Mertaniji) Karam Kanwarji of Merta Parmarji Anand Kanwarji of Malpura in Amber Jhaliji Chandra Kanwarji of Bari Sadri in Mewar
- Issue: List: Sangram Singh Raj Singh I Ari Singh Ajai Singh Jai Singh Dhan Kanwarji m.to Maharao Bhao Singh of Bundi Deep Kanwarji m.to Maharaja Anup Singh of Bikaner Sisodiniji (name unknown) m.to Raja Rai Singh of Nagaur
- House: Ranawat Sisodia
- Dynasty: Sisodias of Mewar
- Father: Karan Singh II
- Mother: Rathorji (Mahechiji) Jeevant Kanwarji d.of Rao Jaswant Singh of Jasol in Marwar

Maharana Jagat Singh I (1607 – 10 April 1652), was the Rana (ruler) of the Kingdom of Mewar belonging to the Sisodia Dynasty. He reigned from 1628 to 1652 CE.

== Accession ==
Jagat Singh succeeded his father, Karan Singh II, as the ruler of Mewar. By the time he ascended the throne, the state had recovered enough from previous conflicts that he sought to expand Mewar’s influence over neighboring territories. During decades of warfare, Mewar had lost significant areas, and regions such as Mandalgarh, Banera, Shahpura, Dungarpur, and Banswara had become effectively autonomous, governed by local chiefs holding these lands as jagirs from the Mughal emperor.

== Military campaigns ==
In an effort to reclaim lost territories, Jagat Singh launched military campaigns against neighboring states including Pratapgarh-Deoliya, Dungarpur, Sirohi, and Banswara. During these conflicts, the ruler of Deoli, Jaswant Singh, was killed, leading his successor, Hari Singh, to appeal for Mughal intervention against Mewar. Jagat Singh was not discontented with this arrangement and sent an army under the command of Ram Singh to plunder the city of Deoliya (Pratapgarh) in 1628. Then the Rana sent his commander Akhai Raj to invade the town of Dungarpur and Sirohi. As a result, the town of Sirohi was exterminated and its neighboring areas were annexed to the Kingdom of Mewar. Next the chief of Banswara, Samar Singh, apologised to the Maharana and recognized his suzerainty.

Although the Mughal emperor Shah Jahan initially overlooked the situations due to his long-standing association with the family—dating back to Shah Jahan's youth as Prince Khurram, he eventually responded in 1643 when he was present in Ajmer. Through negotiations, Jagat Singh's son, Raj Singh I, was able to deal with the emperor there.

== Cultural patronage ==
Jagat Singh is also remembered for his patronage of learning, arts and culture. He constructed Udaipur’s famous Jagdish temple and also completed the construction of Jagmandir palace. An important inscription from 1652, composed by Lakshmi Nath and displayed at the Udaipur temple, provides insight into the contemporary rituals and significant events of the period. The later years of his reign were marked by economic prosperity, as evidenced by the regular ‘tula-daan’ ceremonies in which he was weighed in silver and later in gold, with the corresponding weight given away in charity to Brahmins and the needy.
