= Raj Singh I =

Maharana of Mewar from 1652 to 1680

- Maharana of Mewar
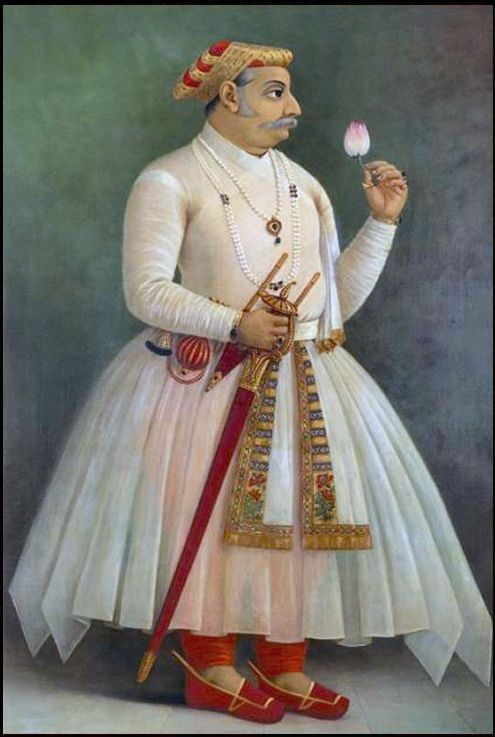
- Raj Singh I

Maharana of Mewar
- Reign: 10 April 1652 – 22 October 1680
- Predecessor: Jagat Singh I
- Successor: Jai Singh
- Born: 24 September 1629
- Died: 22 October 1680 (aged 51)
- Spouse: Hadiji Khuman Kanwarji of Bundi; Rathorji Anand Kanwarji of Idar; Parmarji Ramras Kanwarji of Bijolia in Mewar; Chauhanji Jag Kanwarji of Bedla in Mewar; Rathorji Har Kanwarji of Chavand in Mewar; Jhaliji Roop Kanwarji of Lakhtar in Gujarat; Solankiniji Aas Kanwarji of Veerpur Lunawada in Gujarat; Chauhanji Kirat Kanwarji of Kotharia in Mewar; Rathorji Charumat Kanwarji of Kishangarh; Bhatiyaniji Chandra Kanwarji of Jaisalmer
- Issue: Jai Singh; Bhim Singh (Banera); Bahadur Singh (Bhunas); Gaj Singh; Sardar Singh; Indra Singh; Surat Singh; Surtan Singh; Ajab Kanwarji m.to Maharaja Bhao Singh Ju Devji of Rewa
Regnal name
- Raj Singh I
- House: Sisodiya
- Father: Jagat Singh I
- Mother: Mertaniji Karam Kanwarji d.of Rao Raj Singhji from Merta
- Religion: Hinduism

Maharana Raj Singh I (24 September 1629 – 22 October 1680) was the Maharana of Mewar Kingdom (r. 1652–1680) and eldest son of Maharana Jagat Singh I. He fought against the Mughal Empire and annexed many Mughal territories. He participated in Rajput-Mughal War (1679–1707) and defeated the Mughals.

== Early campaigns ==
During the Mughal war of succession, all the Mughal princes including Aurangzeb requested him to send contingents in their support but Maharana remained aloof. Raj Singh ignored repeated demands for assistance from Aurangzeb. Instead he embarked on his own expeditions using pretence of a ceremonial "Tikadaur", traditionally taken in enemy land.

The Maharana swooped down on various Mughal posts in May 1658. Levies were imposed on outposts and tracts like Mandal, Banera, Shahpura, Sawar, Jahazpur, Phulia etc. which were then under Mughal control, and some areas were annexed. He next attacked pargana of Malpura, Tonk, Chaksu, Lalsot and Sambhar. He plundered these areas and triumphantly returned with spoils to Udaipur.

Raj Singh in 1659 attacked Dungarpur, Banswara and Devaliya who were originally under Mewar rule but later became independent states under Mughal suzerainty. These rulers accepted the suzerainty of Mewar. Raj Singh also conducted raids of Malwa and Gujarat territories of Mughals. Prince Bhim Singh captured Idar and plundered the Mughal post's in Vadnagar, Vishalnagar and Ahmadabad.

== Protest against Jizya ==
Raj Singh protested against the Jizya tax levied by Aurangzeb. Raj Singh opposed Aurangzeb multiple times, once to save the Kishangarh princess Charumati from the Mughals and once by denouncing the Jizya tax levied by Aurangzeb. Chatrapati Shivaji had once taunted Aurangzeb through a letter by challenging him to ask the Rana of Mewar, who is the head of the Hindus, for Jizya instead of terrorising unarmed citizens.

== Rajput War (1679–1707) ==
The Rana gave aid to Durgadas Rathore during the Rajput War (1679–1707) and fought many battles against Aurangzeb as he was a relative of Ajit Singh of Marwar, The conflict was started after the death of Jaswant Singh of Marwar due to Aurangzeb's attempt to interfere in the succession of Marwar. The resistance to Mughal interference was mainly started by the Rajput nobles under Durgadas Rathore and erupted into an all-out war between the Mughal Empire and Rajputs of Marwar supported by Rana Raj Singh. It lasted for almost thirty years. The rebellion reached a climax after the death of Aurangzeb on 3 March 1707 and the capture of Jodhpur by the Rathores on 12 March 1707.

== Cultural activities ==
Rana Raj Singh is also known for giving protection to the Hindu priests and the Shrinathji idol of Mathura from Mughals; he placed it in Nathdwara. The Maharana became a great administrator, able military commander and a patron of art, music and architecture during his lifetime.

=== Rajsamand Lake ===
He also built the famous Rajsamand Lake in 1676 at Kankroli where sea planes use to land prior to India's Independence. He commissioned the text of the Raj Prashasti, which was later inscribed on the pillars around the lake. The lake built by Raj Singh is also known as Rajsamudra.

The lake provided sufficient water to farmers thus increasing productivity and giving relief to famine-stricken areas.

== Death and succession ==
Rana was eventually poisoned by his own men who were bribed by the Mughal emperor Aurangzeb. He died on 22 October 1680 at Oda village in Rajsamand. He was poisoned by certain nobles influenced by the Mughal court. Along with him, his loyal confidant and warrior-poet Charan Askaran Dadhivadia(son of Khemraj), who was the Jagirdar of Oda, also consumed the poisoned food and died alongside the Maharana. Their memorial cenotaphs (chhatris) are still located at Oda village. He was succeeded by his son Jai Singh.

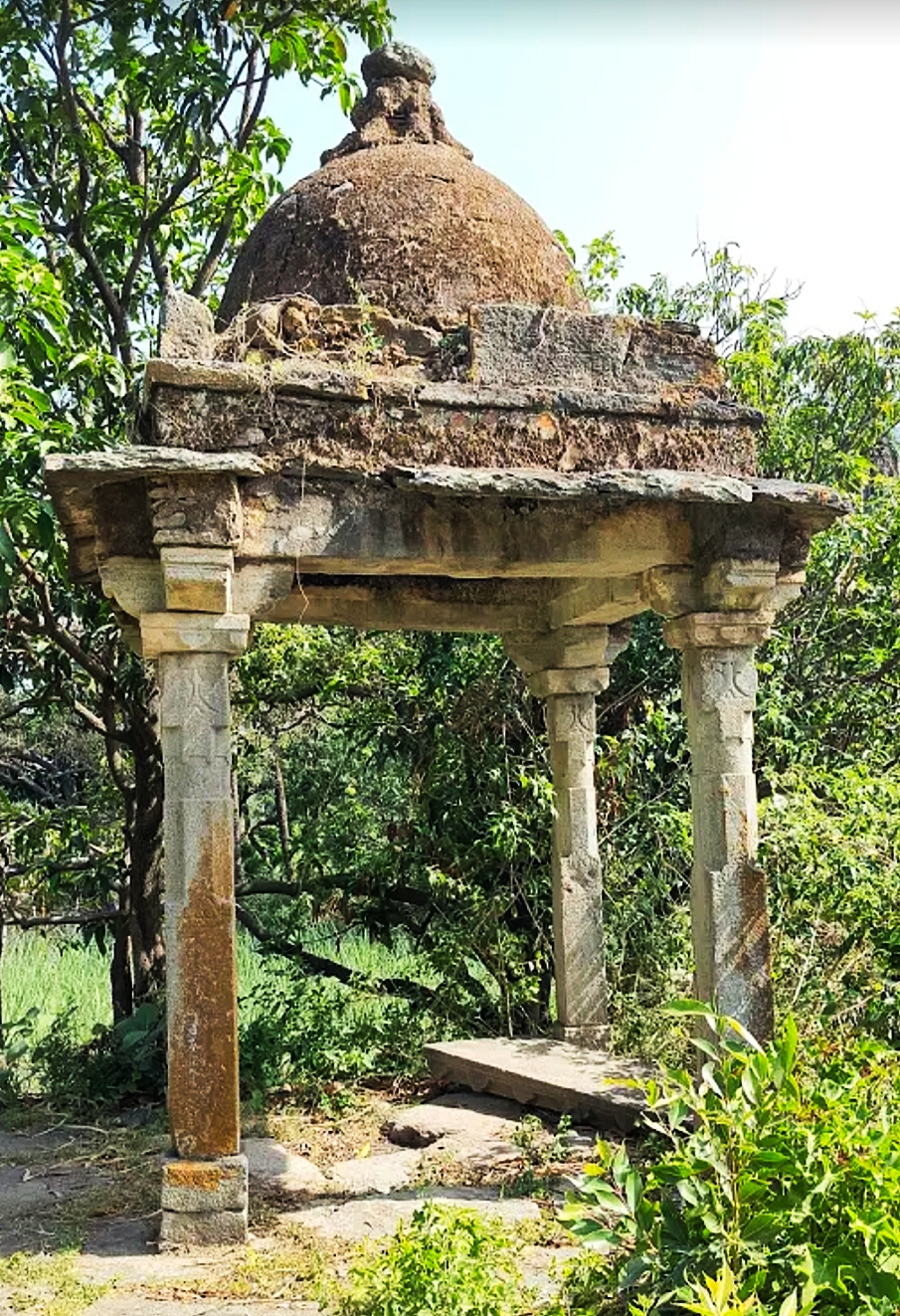
Memorial cenotaph of Charan Askaran Dadhivadia at Oda village

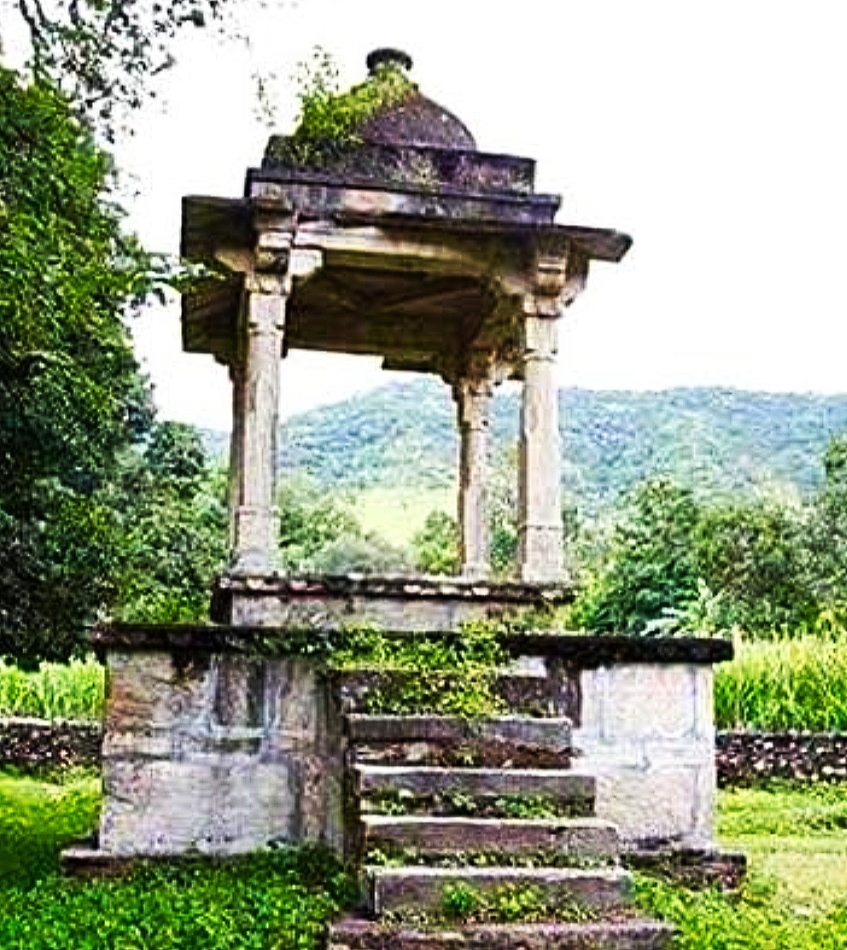
Cenotaph_of_Maharana_Raj_Singh_I_at_Oda_village
