= Dadhivadia =

Charana clan

Dadhivadia is a clan of Charanas of Rajasthan. It is also used as a surname.

== History ==
Dadhivadia is a sub-clan of Deval-Charanas who held the sasan estate of Dadhwada, which was located in Merta tehsil, Nagaur. Initially, the Deval-Charanas were positioned as proḷapāta to the Sankhla (Rajput) rulers of Roon. But in the 15th century, Rao Jodha defeated the Sankhla and took control of Roon. Henceforth, due to the political turmoil, the families of Deval-Charanas started migrating to other regions and kingdoms, such as Marwar, Mewar, Bikaner and Jaipur, where they became known as Dadhivadia, signifying their origin from Dadhwada. They contributed to the polity of these kingdoms as litterateurs, historians, administrators and warriors. Lineages of the clan include the Madhodasot, Mukandasot, Dvarkadasot, Prayagdasot, Harbhanot, Venidasot, and Mokamdasot Dadhivadia.

=== Mewar ===
One such Dadhivadia family moved along with the Sankhlas to Mewar, where the reigning king Maharana Kumbha was a maternal-nephew of the Sankhlas. Dadhivadia Jaitsinh, poet and scholar in Kumbha's court, was granted the jagir of Dharta and Gotipa (Naharmagra pargana). His son Mahipal (Mehpa), was a renowned poet in Rana Sanga's court, who then awarded him the estate of Dhokaliya in 1496 (VS 1553).

Mandan, younger brother of Mehpa, was a bhakta-poet and composed poetry devoted to Rama and Krishna. He received Shavar in sasan from Rana Sanga. He died in 1527, fighting against the Mughal army in the Battle of Khanwa.

In the 17th century, Khemraj Dadhivadia, a poet-scholar-warrior, saved the life of prince Jagat Singh I of Mewar. Jagat Singh, after his coronation, awarded the estate of Thikariya to Khemraj, now known as Khempur. Due to his literary skills, character and diplomacy, Khemraj received honors and grants from other kingdoms as well. He received the estates of Rajakiyawas (1637 CE) from Gaj Singh I of Marwar, Kasandra from Akheraj II of Sirohi, among others.

Askaran, son of Khemraj, held the jagir of Oda in Rajsamand. It was here that Askaran and Maharana Raj Singh I had their final meal together in 1680. However, it was poisoned, leading to their deaths.

=== Marwar ===
Chundaji (grandson of Mandan Dadhivadia) was a saint-poet and authored several texts (no longer extant) - Rāmalīlā, Chāṇakya-Vel, and Nimandhabandha. He is also known for building the Charbhuja Temple of Merta. Contemporary rulers like Rao Viramdeo of Merta and Achaldas Raimalot Mertiya honored him. Rao Chanda of Balunda granted Balunda-ka-Vas to Chunda. Chundaji died in battle in 1585, fighting alongside Rao Chanda against Hasan Ali of Nagaur. Mohkamdas, son of Mandan, was granted Gadhsuriya in sasan by Mertiya Balbhadra Surtanot.

Madhavdas, the forefather of Madhodasot-Dadhivadia, was taught by his father Chunda. He was renowned as a saint-poet-scholar-warrior and was honored by Sur Singh of Marwar for his literary skills. Sur Singh granted him the estates of Napawas (Pali pargana) and Jalora (Merta pargana). Madhavdas was one of the four Charanas who offered their opinions on Veli Krisan Rukmani ri of Prithviraj Rathore, his opinion being favourable. He authored several texts including Rama Raso, Nisani Gajamokha, and Bhasha Dasham Skandha. He died in 1633, fighting in a battle protecting the cattle against the muslims.

Sundardas, son of Madhavdas, was among the eight Charanas who were honored by Jaswant Singh of Marwar in Lahore. Mukandas, the forefather of Mukandasot-Dadhivadia, died in 1730, fighting valiantly in the Battle of Ahemdabad (Siege of Ahmedabad) against Sarbuland Khan. He was a close friend of Abhai Singh of Marwar who composed marsiya in his memory and granted the estate of Kooprawas (Bilara pargana) to his descendants.

Dwarikadas, ancestor of Dvarkadasot-Dadhivadia, also a veteran of Battle of Ahemdabad, was a respected poet-scholar and was honored by Abhai Singh of Marwar with the sasan of Basni-Dadhivadian (in Pali pargana). Dwarikadas represented Marwar in the debate of superiority among Marwar, Mewar and Jaipur. One of his notable work is Davavait Ajitsingh ri (Dwarikadas Dadhivadia ri Davavait).

=== Bikaner ===
In Churu region of Bikaner kingdom, Puraji and Dasaji Dadhivadia, were granted the sasan of Surawas by Sura Mohil, one of the last Mohil chieftains of Chhapar-Dronpur. Here, Prayagdas (ancestor of Prayagdasot-Dadhivadia), Harbhan (ancestor of Harbhanot-Dadhivadia), Gangadan were notable poet-scholars of their time. Sihaji Dadhivadia was granted the jagir of Ranasar in sasan. Aside from these, Dadhivadias held Mangasar, Raghunathpura, Redi-Bhurawas and Karnisar in sasan.

== Notable people ==
- Kaviraja Shyamaldas
- C D Deval
