= Amar Singh II =

Maharana of Mewar from 1698 to 1710

Maharana Amar Singh II
- Rana of Mewar
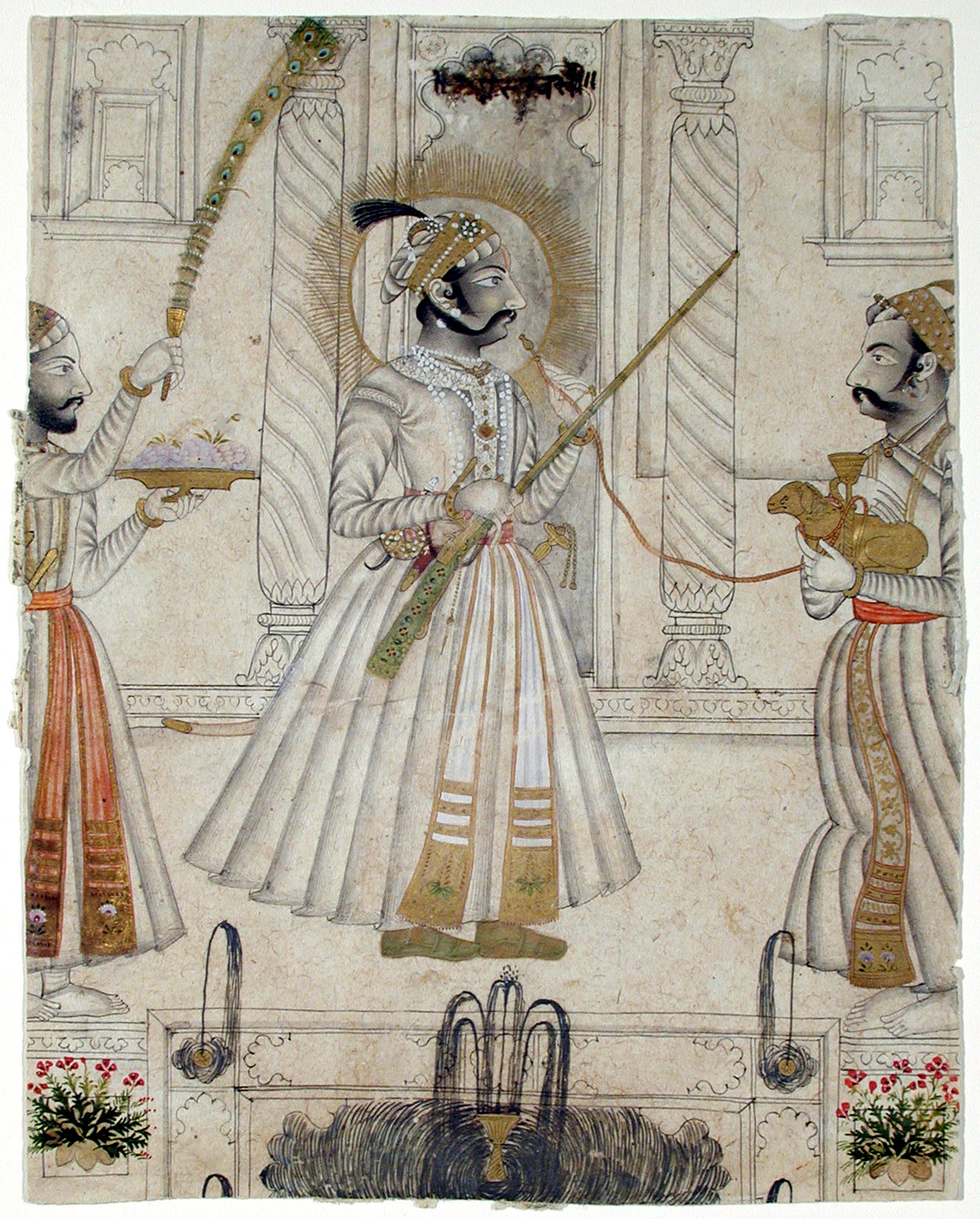
- Amar Singh II

Rana of Mewar
- Reign: 23 September 1698 – 10 December 1710
- Predecessor: Jai Singh
- Successor: Sangram Singh II
- Born: 3 October 1672
- Died: 10 December 1710 (aged 38)
- Spouse: Chauhanji Dev Kanwarji of Bedla in Mewar Rathorji Kesar Kanwarji of Idar Chauhanji Suraj Kanwarji of Kotharia in Mewar Jhaliji Sundar Kanwarji of Lakhtar in Gujarat Bhatiyaniji Chatra Kanwarji of Mohi in Mewar Solankiniji Saras Kanwarji of Veerpur Lunawada in Gujarat Jhaliji Nawal Kanwarji of Gogunda Rathorji (Mahechiji) Bishan Kanwarji of Jasol in Marwar
- Issue: Sangram Singh II Chandra Kanwarji m.to Maharaja Sawai Jai Singh of Jaipur
- House: Ranawat Sisodia
- Dynasty: Sisodias of Mewar
- Father: Jai Singh
- Mother: Hadiji Ganga Kanwarji d.of Rao Raja Chattar Sal of Bundi

Maharana Amar Singh II (3 October 1672 – 10 December 1710) was the Maharana of Mewar Kingdom ruling from 1698 to 1710. He was the eldest son of his father and predecessor Maharana Jai Singh of Mewar.

== Reign ==
Maharana Amar Singh II succeeded his father Maharana Jai Singh, at a juncture when the whole of Rajputana was scattered with divided kingdoms and nobles. Maharana Amar Singh II made various reforms for the prosperity of his people and Mewar but his major contribution was his alliance with rebel kingdoms of Amber and Marwar. During his reign, the Mughal power was on a decline with multiple revolts and uprisings. Amar Singh II took advantage of this time and entered into a private treaty with the Mughals. At the same time he entered into matrimonial alliance with Amber, sealing his friendship by giving his daughter to Sawai Jai Singh of Jaipur in matrimony. The kingdoms of Udaipur, Amber and Marwar, united now formed a triple league against the Mughal.

Special rules were set for Rajput states, so as to strengthen the Rajputana and denying assistance to the Mughal. Amar Singh II nevertheless fought with stronger efforts for the freedom of Mewar and other Rajput states. He also fought against the Jaziya; a religious tax imposed on the Hindus for their pilgrimage.

But with the death of Amar Singh II, the legacy and efforts of an independent brave king also died, who tried to unite the Rajputana against the Mughal for the freedom of his people and prosperity of his motherland.
