= Devigarh =

Former royal residence in Udaipur, India

Devi Garh Palace

General information
- Location: Delwara, Udaipur, Rajasthan
- Coordinates: 24.7725°N 73.7493°E
- Opening: 2000
- Owner: Walled City Hotels Private Limited
- Operator: Walled City Hotels Private Limited

Other information
- Number of suites: 39
- Number of restaurants: 1
- Parking: Yes

Website
- raasdevigarh.com//

Devi Garh Palace is a heritage hotel and resort, housed in the 18th-century Devi Garh palace in the village of Delwara. It was the royal residence of the rulers of Delwara principality, from the mid-18th century till the mid-20th century. Situated in the Aravalli hills, 28 km northeast of Udaipur, Rajasthan, Devigarh forms one of the three main passes into the valley of Udaipur.

In 2006, The New York Times named it as one of India's leading luxury hotels, and Frommer's Review, while calling it "the best hotel on the subcontinent", stated that "Devi Garh is more than beautiful, it is inspiring." In 2008, it was featured in Lifestyle Channel Discovery Travel and Living series, 'Dream Hotels' spread over five continents, other two Indian hotels that made it to the list of 55, were Taj Lake Palace, Udaipur, and Rambagh Palace, Jaipur

== History ==
Delwara, nestled in the Aravali hills, is about 28 km away from Udaipur and close to Eklingji Temple on way to temple town of Nathdwara. Delwara was originally known as ‘Devkul Patan Nagri’ which means the town of god, boasted of over 1500 temples at one time, out of which there were about 400 Jain temples. The ancient Jain temples of Delwara, now in total ruins, were built during the reign of Emperor Samprati (224-215 BC). He was the grandson of Emperor Ashok and son of Ashoka’s blind son Kunal. Samprati became the Emperor of the entire western and southern part of India (Maurya Empire) and ruled from Ujjain. It is said that Samprati, also known as ‘Jain Ashoka’, built thousands of Jain temples in India. It may be noted that all the ancient Jain monuments of Rajasthan and Gujarat, including the Jain temples at Delwara (Mewar), are also attributed to Emperor Samprati.

During the 12th century, Rao Samant Singh of Jalore had four sons – Rao Kanhadeo, Maldeo, Raningdeo, and Sagar. Rao Kanhadeo and his son Kunwar Viramdeo were killed in a battle against Allauddin Khilji in 1311, while Rao Maldeo and Rao Raningdeo ruled smaller Jagirs in Jalore. It is believed that Rao Sagar was given the Jagir of Delwara, as the adjoining areas of Girva (Udaipur) were ruled by Deora Chauhans until 14-15th century.

Around the middle of the 13th century, Raja Sagar, a Deora Chauhan and a descendant of Rao Kirtipal of Jalore was a very brave king of Delwara. He was the progenitor of Bothra Bachhawat Mehtas. Raja Sagar had three sons - Bohitya, Gangadas and Jaisingh. Whenever there was an invasion from Muslims, Rana Jaitra Singh (1213–53) and later his son Rana Tej Singh (1262–73) called Raja Sagar for help in the battle. Raja Sagar always came along with army and fought valiantly against the invading Muslims.

Later, the Kingdom of Mewar was divided into 16 first grade thikanas or districts. Delwara was one of the 16 Rajwadas, along with Badi Sadri and Gogunda. Delwara was ruled by Jhala Rajputs from the 15th century onwards. The ancestor of the family was Raja Raj Singh of Halvad (Dhrangadhara), son of Harpal Singh Makwana. Jhalas performed meritorious service in Mewar along with Maharana Kumbha (1433–68). During the reign of Maharana Udai Singh I (1468–73) sons of Raja Raj Singh, Ajja and Sajja, came to Mewar. The Maharana granted the Jagir of Delwara to Kunwar Sajja and that of Bari Sadri to Kunwar Ajja Singh. Ajja fought alongside Maharana Sangram Singh I (1509-1527) and against Babur in 1527 at the Battle of Khanwa. When Maharana Sangram Singh (Rana Sanga) was wounded on the battlefield, Ajja donned the Maharana's tunic, which kept the Mewar army together but proved fatal for Raj Rana Ajja, who died in the battle. As many as 7 generations of the Jhala family had been sacrificing their lives for Maharanas of Mewar. Later, the second wife of Maharana Udai Singh II (1537–72) was a daughter of Raj Rana Jait Singh of Delwara.

The principality of Delwara was given out to Raja Sajja Singh, one of the lieutenants of Maharana Pratap, after the 'Battle of Haldighati' in 1576. First a rudimentary palace was built by Raghudev Singh II, which was later revamped a few years later in the 1760s for a royal visit of the Maharani of Udaipur. The seven-storeyed hilltop fort palace in Rajasthani architecture was built in the 1760s.

== Restoration ==
Two centuries later, it was in ruins and empty for 20 years, when it was acquired by Poddars, an industrial family from Shekhawati region living in Bangalore in 1984. The restoration took over 15 years and a team of 750 people, led by architect [GAUTAM BHATIA] and architect Navin Gupta. The interior spaces were redesigned in minimalistic style by Mumbai-based interior designer Rajiv Saini, to turn this palace into an all-suite luxury hotel, complete with a spa and Ayurvedic retreat, today it is considered one of India's best-designed hotels.

== Visitors and events ==
In 2004, it came into limelight with British model-actress Liz Hurley and her NRI boyfriend Arun Nayar's visit to the Devigarh Palace to celebrate the latter's birthday. Since then it has also been visited by Amitabh Bachchan, Saif Ali Khan and Fardeen Khan, and the Ambani brothers.

The 2007 Hindi film, Eklavya: The Royal Guard was set and extensively shot at Devigarh.

== Transport ==
Located 28 km northeast of Udaipur, on the road between Udaipur and the religious township of Nathdwara, Devi Garh is a 45-minute drive from the city.
