= Baansi =

Baansi Bansi
- Village
- Location in Rajasthan, India Baansi (India)
- Coordinates: 24.3167°N 74.4000°E
- Country: India
- State: Rajasthan
- District: Chittorgarh

Government
  - Body: Gram Panchayat
- Elevation: 300 m (980 ft)

Population (2001)
  - Total: 1,500

Languages
  - Official: Hindi
- Time zone: UTC+5:30 (IST)
- PIN: 312401
- Vehicle registration: RJ09
- Nearest city: Badi Sadri
- Literacy: 70%
- Lok Sabha constituency: Chittorgarh
- Vidhan Sabha constituency: Badi Sadri
- Civic agency: Gram Panchayat

Baansi is a village in Bari Sadri Tehsil of District Chittorgarh in Rajasthan, India. It was ruled by Rajputs of the Shaktawat clan before independence. Its name derives from the abundance of bamboo (called bans in Hindi). It is 94 km from Udaipur City and 78 km South west of Chittorgarh.

Bansi was one of the sixteen umrao thikanas of the house of Mewar.

== Geographic features ==
=== Hills and Nearby Villages ===
Bansi is surrounded by many hills, the most famous being that of Dhunimataji situated south of the bansi town. It is a religious place with temples dedicated to Shiv-Parvati. Further away are the hills called Ardaji, Pagaliyaji, Chela, Chadiwali, Banjari and Arni Ghaata. Towards west of Bansi village are Dhalawad, Mahuda, Amarapura, Lunda and Kanore. Towards the east are Sarvanya, Tanbada, Dantli, Shikarvaadi and Chudiya hills and Karadi Ghaata. Towards the north are Boheda village and Badisadri ka ghata. In thein south Sita Mata wildlife sanctuary and Dhriyawad.

=== Rivers ===
The river outlets include:

- Naleshwar river
- Chara river
- Karmoi river
- Chittri river

=== Tourist Places ===
- Dhuni Mata Temple
- Naleshwar Mahadev Temple
- Aavri Mata Temple
- Sita Mata Wildlife Sanctuary
- Shree Raam Temple

=== Lakes ===
- Mansarovar: Situated towards west of Bansi, it is a man made lake with mud-dam. It was built by Rawat Man Singhji of Bansi in 1859, it was completed in 1899 by Rawat Takhat Singhji and named after his father Rawat Man Singhji Shaktawat.
- Amritkund: Towards south west of the village, it was built by Rawat Man Singhji. In 1935, it was repaired by sister of Rawat Man singhji, the Thakuranisa of Kushalgarh and she donated Rs 600 in those days for the work.
- Kalera : it is situated near Navanya Village, it is largest dam and was built by Rawat Takhat Singhji Shaktawat in 1899 (1956 V.S.)
- Takhat Sagar: situated 5 km from village Baansi.
- Bhogera : 1.5 km east of Bansi village.
- Others: Hindolina, Banjasya, Kachela, Rawela, Govindsagar, Sahji ki talai, Kunwarji ki badi (by Kunwar Gangadas in 1668)
