= Delwara =

Sub-Tehsil in Rajsamand district of Rajasthan, India

- Sub-Tehsil
- Nickname: "Devkul Patan Nagri"
- Location in Rajasthan, India Delwara (Rajasthan)
- Coordinates: 24.7752°N 73.7463°E
- Country: India
- State: Rajasthan
- District: Rajsamand
- Established: 224-215 BC
- Elevation: 586 m (1,923 ft)

Population (2011)
  - Total: 4,429

Languages
  - Official: Hindi
  - Additional Official: English
  - Regional: Mewari
- Time zone: UTC+5:30 (IST)
- PIN: 313202
- Telephone code: +91- 2952
- Vehicle registration: RJ-30
- Nearest Places: Udaipur, Nathdwara, Rajsamand, Haldighati, Kumbhalgarh, Chittorgarh
- Climate: BSh

Delwara, nestled in the Aravalli Range hills, is a small town about 28 km away from Udaipur, Mewar (a former state in present-day Rajasthan), and close to Eklingji Temple, on the way to the temple town of Nathdwara, in the state of Rajasthan, India. Delwara was originally known as ‘Devkul Patan Nagri’, which means the town of god. It boasted over 1500 temples at one time, including over 400 Jain temples. Delwara was the center of learning and culture before the 15th century AD.

== Historical & Spiritual Background of Temple Town ==
The ancient Jain temples of Delwara, now in total ruins, are believed to have been built during the reign of Samrat Samprati (224-215 BC). He was the grandson of Samrat Ashoka and the son of Ashoka's blind son Kunal. Samprati became the Emperor of the entire western and southern parts of India (Maurya Empire) and ruled from Ujjain. It is said that Samprati, also known as ‘Jain Ashoka’, built thousands of Jain temples in India. It may be noted that all the ancient Jain monuments of Rajasthan and Gujarat, including the Jain temples at Delwara (Mewar), are also attributed to Samrat Samprati.

=== City of Learning and Education ===
Delwara, Nagda and Aahar (Ayad) were the centers of learning and culture before the 15th century AD. Most princes of Mewar and adjoining kingdoms were groomed in the art of warfare and formal education at Delwara. Hence it was also known as Kunwarpada – center of learning. Delwara was a large town that spread from Gandharva Sagar Lake to Nagda. Today, only 25% of the original town remains.

=== Grandeur of Jain temples ===
As of 2017, three main Jain temples remain in Delwara, for which restoration work has been undertaken. Two of the temples are of Rishabhdev (ऋषभदेव भगवान) and one of Parshvnath (पार्श्वनाथ भगवान). The Jain temples at Delwara were built with white marble stones and despite being plain and austere on the outside, the interiors of all these temples are covered with delicate carvings. Each temple has a walled courtyard called Rang Mandap. In the center of the courtyard is the shrine with the image of the deity, Rishabhdev and Parshvnath, respectively. Around the large courtyard, there are numerous small shrines, each housing a beautiful sculpture of the 24 Tirthankara (तीर्थंकर) with a series of elegantly carved pillars from the entrance to the courtyard. The special feature of these temples are their ceilings, which are circular in eleven richly carved concentric rings. The central ceiling of each temple is adorned with magnificent carvings, and it culminates into an ornamented central pendant. The pendant of the domes tapers down, forming a drop or point, like a lotus flower. This is an astonishing piece of work. It symbolizes the divine grace coming down to fulfill human aspirations. The figures of sixteen goddesses of knowledge, (विध्या देवी) are carved on the ceilings.

This site marks the very location where Muni Sundar, a Jain monk from the 15th century, crafted Shantikarma: a ritual aimed at safeguarding against diseases.

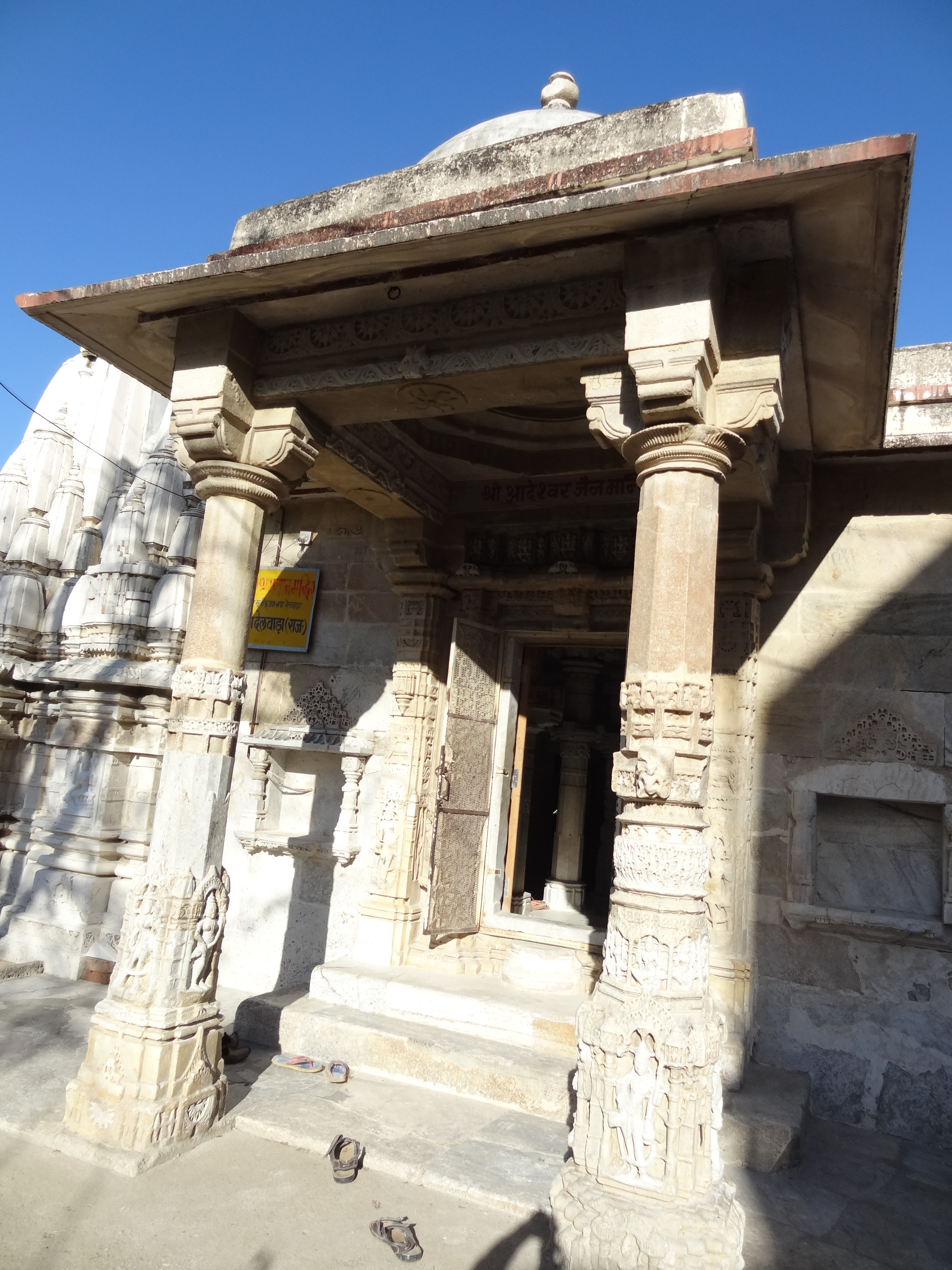
Adeshwar (Rishabhdev) Jain Temple at Delwara - entrance (2015)

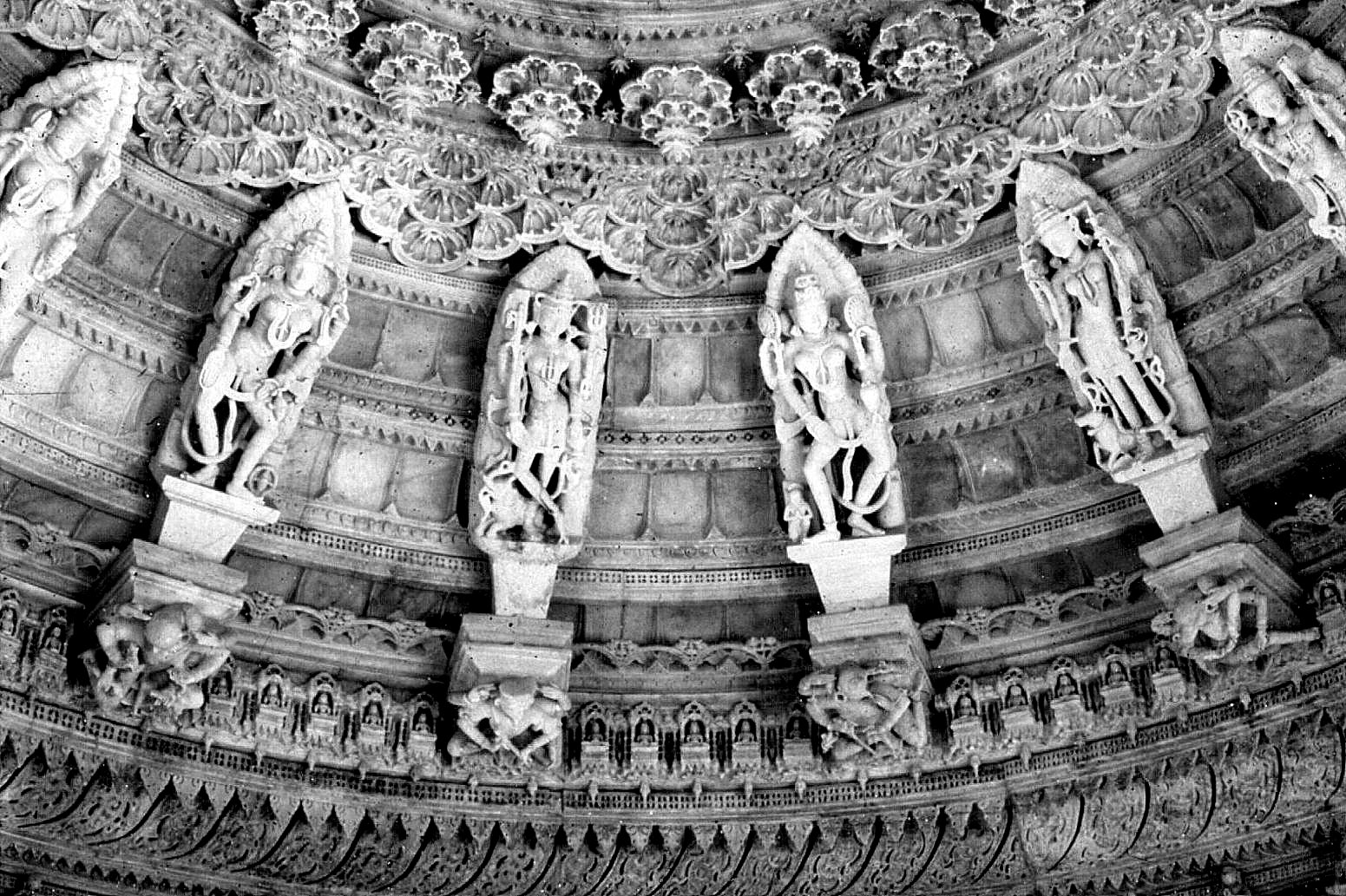
Central dome with Vidhya Devies

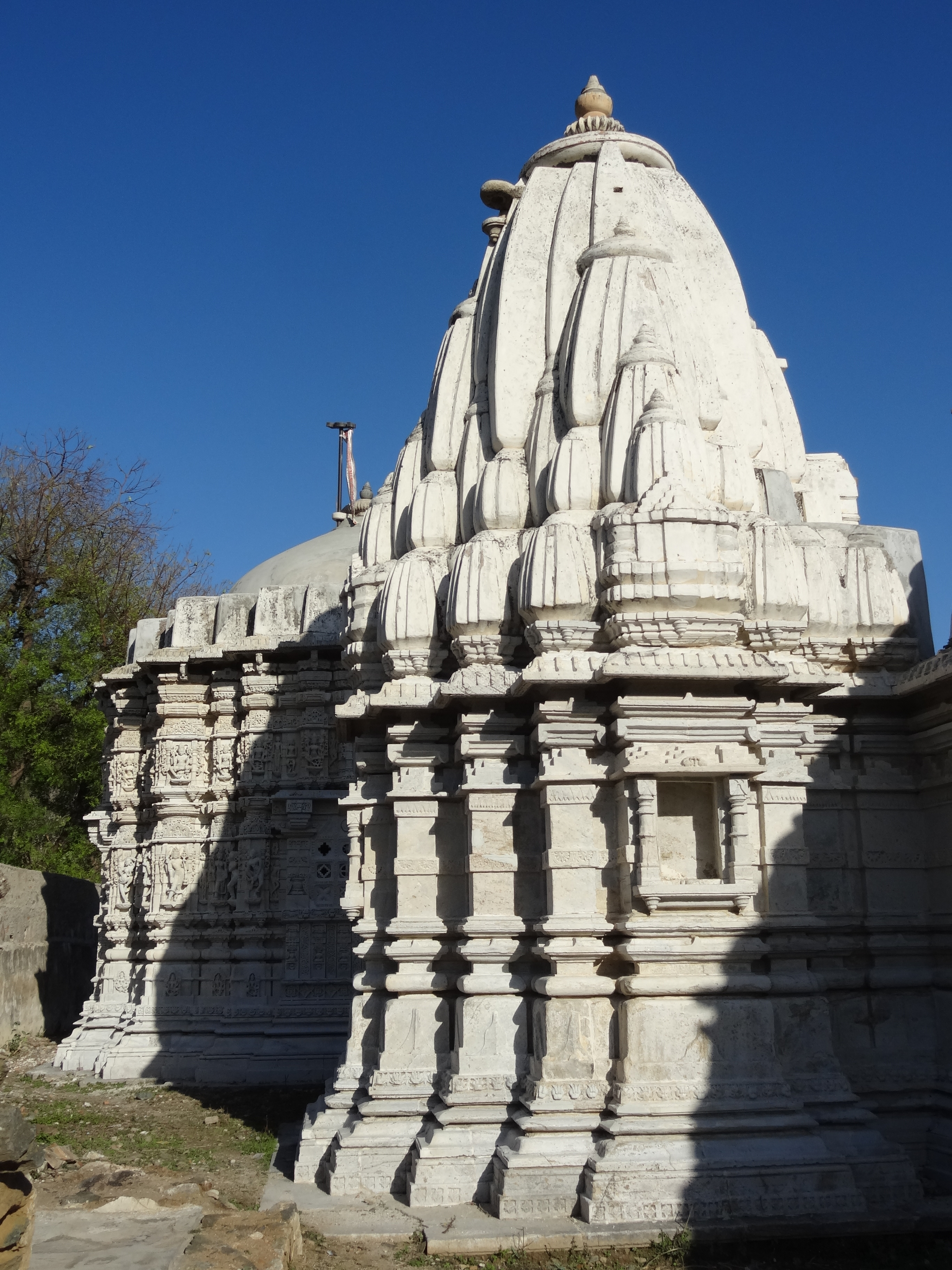
Adeshwar (Rishabhdev) Jain Temple at Delwara

There is a story that the ministers of the Solanki rulers of Gujarat visited these temples during the 11th and 13th centuries AD, and were very impressed with the architecture and carving of the temples. At the request of these visiting ministers, the then rulers of Delwara (Mewar), provided the design and drawings of the Jain temples. When Vimal Shah, minister, governor of Chandravati and commander-in-chief of Bhimadev I (1022–64), the Solanki ruler of Gujarat, came to Delwara, he was inspired by Jain Acharya to wash out his sins perpetrated in the battle fields. He hence constructed a temple near Mount Abu which was the replication of Delwara (Mewar) Jain temple.

The temple is known as Vimal Vasahi (Shri Adinath temple). He was remorseful and spent the rest of his life in religious discourse at Chandravati (near Abu road). Later, in 1230 AD, the two Porwad brothers – Vastupal and Tejpal, both ministers of the Vaghela ruler of Gujarat, came to Delwara. They also built the Jain temples designed after Vimal Vasahi temples near Abu. Since these five temples, built between the 11th and 13th centuries at Abu, are similar in design and architecture to the ones at Delwara (Mewar), they came to be known as Dilwara Temples (देलवाडा जैन मंदिर). These temples are a composite cluster of five temples, with their own unique identities. Each is named after the small village in which it is located. The grandeur of sculptured marble, exquisite carvings of ceilings, domes, pillars and arches of the temple, which is beyond anyone's expectations, is far superior to the originals at Delwara (Mewar).

== History ==
=== Under Chauhans ===
Raja Sagar, fourth son of Rao Samant Singh of Jalore and a descendant of Rao Kirtipal, was bestowed the Jagir of Delwara during the mid-13th century. It is believed that later Maharana Udai Singh II (1540–1572), annexed these Jagirs from the Deora Chauhans to move his capital from Chittor to Udaipur when he lost Chittor to Akbar in 1568.

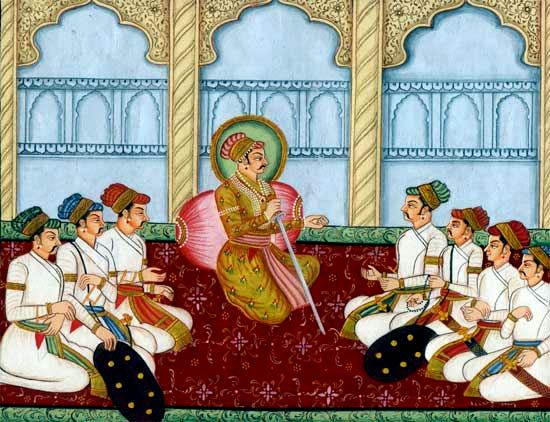
Representative painting of Raja Sagar with his ministers at Delwara. Photo Rajput dynasties Google

There is another bard's tale that during the 12th century, Delwara was being ruled by a Rajput ruler Rao Bhim Singh. His only daughter was married to Rao Samant Singh of Jalore, who had two queens. Sagar was born to Delwara Baiji. Due to differences with the other queen over succession to the throne of Jalore, she returned to her father's place, Delwara. Since Rao Bhim Singh, did not have any male child, his grandson Sagar, a Deora Chauhan, ascended the throne of Delwara.

=== Battle of Bhutalghati ===
One of the fiercest battles Raja Sagar fought alongside Rana Jaitra Singh (1213–53) was against Sultan Shams-ud-din Iltutmish (1211–36) at Bhutalghati, near Nagda. He ensured full protection for Jaitra Singh, as Delwada's army fought fearlessly alongside Mewar army. Sultan Iltutmish destroyed many in and around Nagda and Delwara. Villages were also burnt.
Dr Shri Krishan Jugnu, writes in his book, Nandeshma Abhilekh (Hindi) – Rajasthan Ke Prachin Abhilekh

This fierce battle was fought in the valley near Nagda towards Gogunda. Besides Gohils, there were brave soldiers from Chauhans, Chandanas, Solankis, Parmars, Chaarans and Tribals who fought for Mewar. They gave a tough fight to Sultan's army. However, when Jaitra Singh was cornered, he was secretly sheltered in one of the houses in Nagda. Iltutmish was furious and encircled Nagda. Every house was searched, burnt and destroyed. In the 14th century, according to a mythological tradition of offering water tribute to the martyrs of Bhutalghati, a lake was built at Nagda and christened as BaaghelaTaalab.” There is another bard that says that Maharana Mokal built this lake in memory of his brother Baagh Singh.

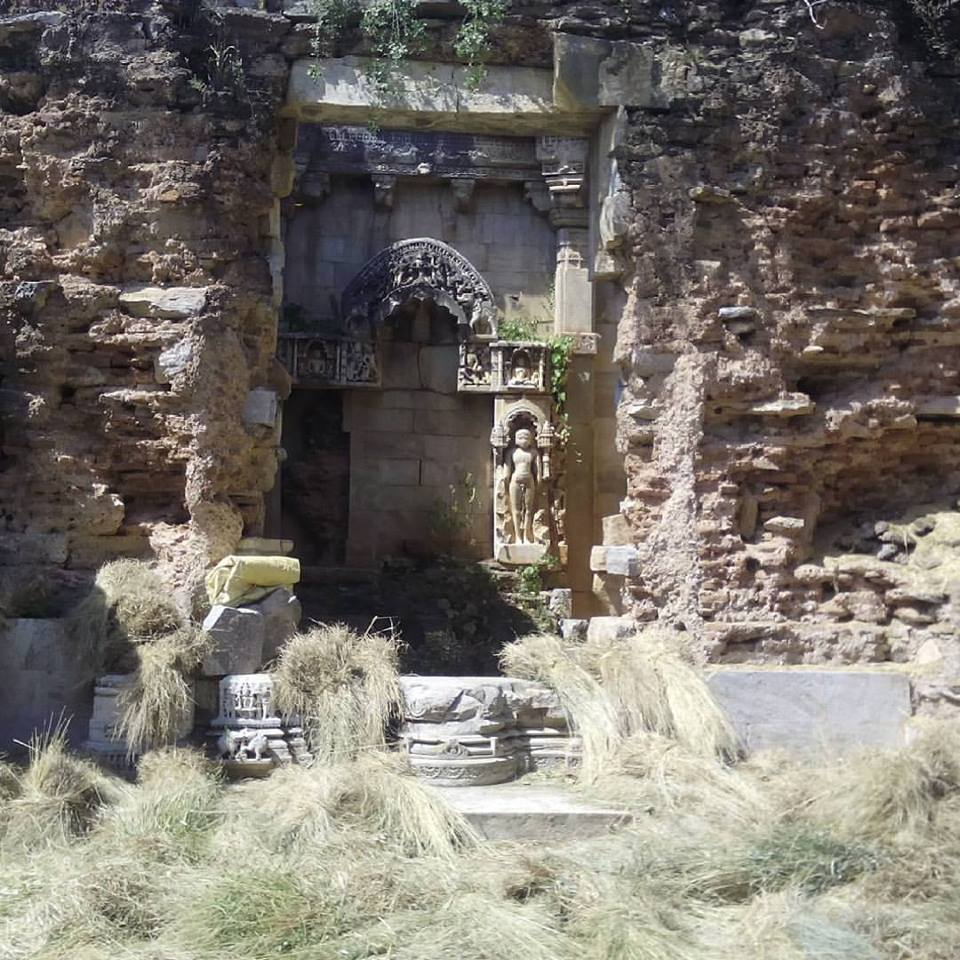
Machind Jain temple (2015). Photo: Mahesh Sharma

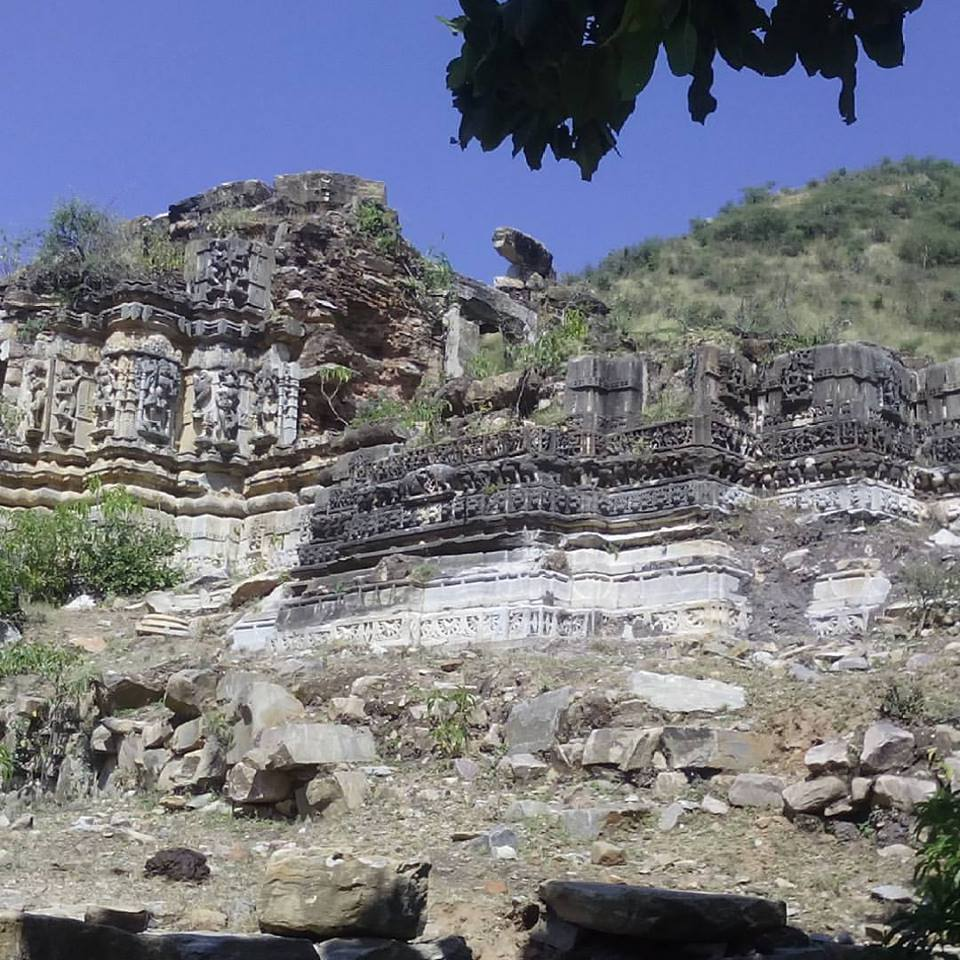
Jain Temple at Machind (2015). Photo: Mahesh Sharma

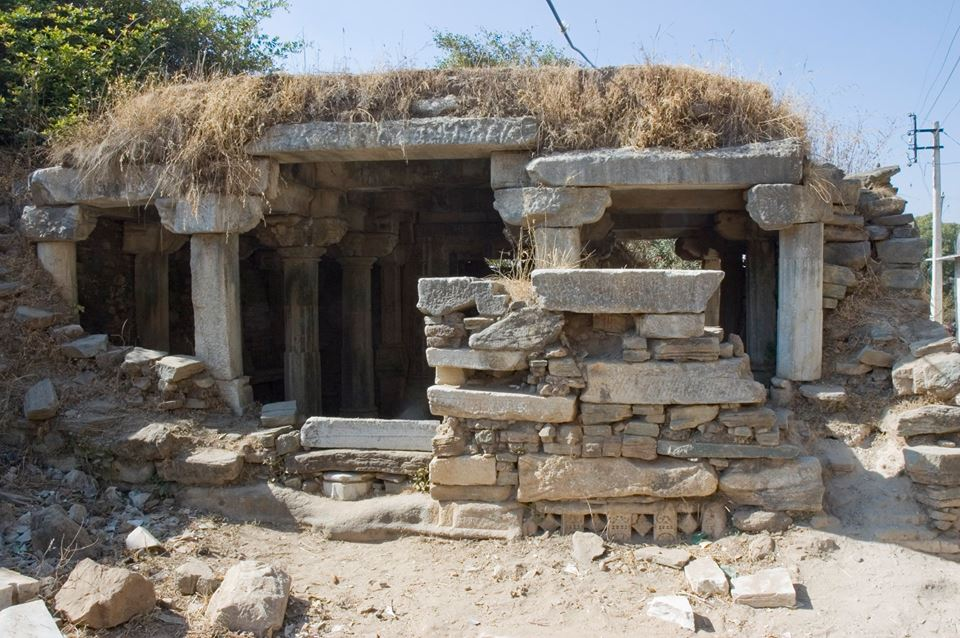
Surya Temple at Nandeshma destroyed by Muslim invader Sultan Shams-ud-din-Iltutmish in the 13th century. Photo: Mahesh Sharma

=== Under Jhala Rajputs ===
Later, in the 15th century, the Kingdom of Mewar was divided into 16 first grade thikanas or districts. Delwara was one of the 16 Rajwadas, along with Badi Sadri and Gogunda. Delwara has been ruled by Jhala Rajputs from the 15th century onwards. The ancestor of the Jhala family was Raj Sahib Raidharji Vogohoji of Dhrangadhara (Halvad), descendant of Harpaldeva. During the reign of Maharana Raimal (1473–1509), Ajoji (Ajay Singh Jhala) the deposed son of Raj Sahib Raidharji, along with his brother Sajoji (Sajay Singh Jhala) came to Mewar. Jhalas performed meritorious service in Mewar. Later the Maharana granted the Jagir of Delwara to Kunwar Sajja and that of Bari Sadri to Kunwar Ajay Singh and were granted the title of Raj Rana.

Ajja fought alongside Maharana Sangram Singh I (1509–1527) against Babur in 1527 at the Battle of Khanwa. When Maharana Sangram Singh (Rana Sanga) was wounded on the battlefield, Ajja donned the Maharana's tunic, which kept the Mewar army together but proved fatal for Raj Rana Ajja, who died in the battle. As many as 7 generations of the Jhala family had been sacrificing their lives for the Maharanas of Mewar.

== Notable places ==
Devi Garh Palace - Located in the Aravali hills of Rajasthan, this 18th-century palace in the village of Delwara has undergone years of restoration and rebuilding since 1760. Its all-suite luxury hotel with 39 suites utilizes landscaped gardens and spa services using local marble and semi-precious stones. Additionally, it features a restaurant that offers customers both Asian and Continential dishes.

Rishabhdev Jain Temple - This white marble temple, more than 700 years old, has 149 pillars and 52 individual shrines. Its inner chambers and columns are decorated with marble carvings and stonework.

Parshwanath Jain Temple - This 900+ year-old temple's architecture and sculptures reveal the work of great artisans and craftsmen. A unique feature of the temple is a chamber about 5 meters underground, which houses 13 beautiful idols. Over the past few years, the Jain community has initiated a large scale project to restore this temple to its former state.

Sadhna Workshop - About 20 years ago, a patchwork program was initiated in Delwara by a local NGO, Seva Mandir, as an income generation activity to promote women's empowerment. Today, this initiative has transformed into a self-owned enterprise involving more than 600 women from various villages. Of these, around 250 are from Delwara, which is where their main workshop is found. Open to the public, fair trade and high quality women's clothing can be purchased here.

Hunting Tower - According to a book published by the Adeshvar Jain Temple, this hunting tower located on Kantya hill, locally known as Audhi, was built by King Jasvantsinh. It was used by the king for hunting during his rule.

Palera Talab - A large lake standing at the entrance to Delwara, which was built around 1875 AD. Two small domed pavilions ornamented the lake, adding to its charm. The name Palera Talab is derived from Sanskrit 'palankarta', which means ‘protector’ – an appropriate name given to the lake that is the town's main water source.

Indra Kund - A scenic step well that is considered a masterfully example of stone carvings and is about 15 meters deep.
