= Karan Singh II =

Maharana of Mewar from 1620 to 1628

Maharana Karan Singh
- Ruler of Mewar
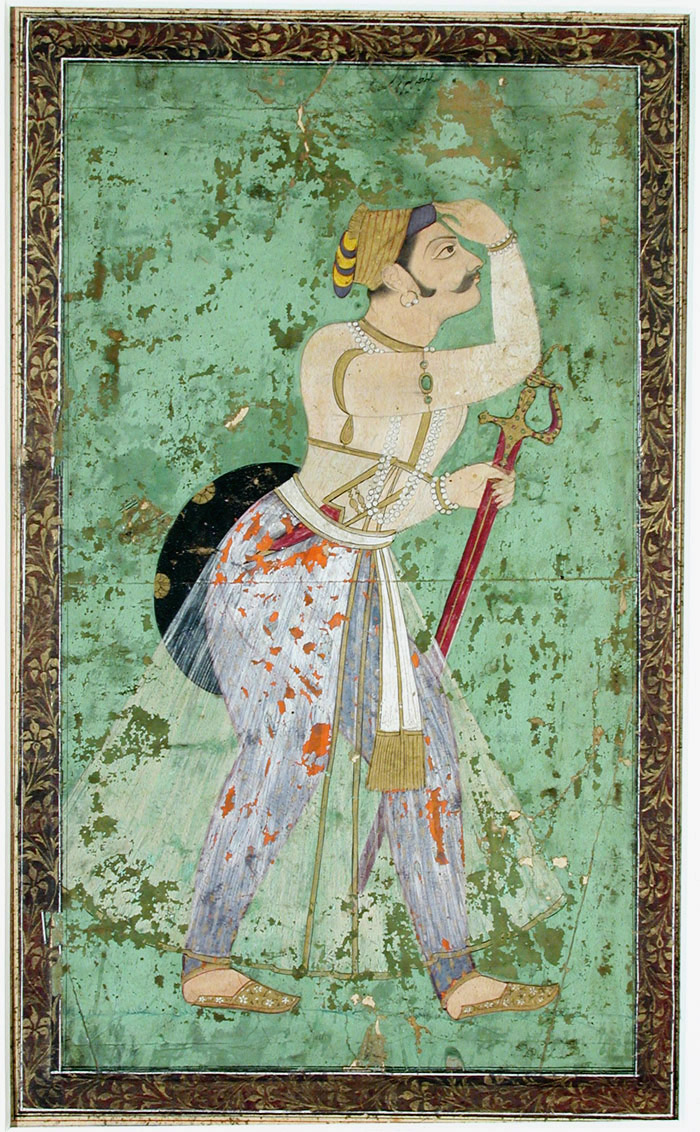
- Maharana Karan Singh

Maharana of Mewar
- Reign: 26 January 1620 – March 1628
- Predecessor: Amar Singh I
- Successor: Jagat Singh I
- Born: 7 January 1584
- Died: March 1628 (aged 44)
- Spouse: Rathorji Jeevant Kanwarji of Jasol in Marwar; Chauhanji (Devadiji) Kamal Kanwarji of Sirohi; Parmarji Sujan Kanwarji of Malpura in Ajmer; Rathorji Shringar Kanwarji of Marwar; Solankiniji Prem Kanwarji of Virpur/ Lunawada in Gujarat; Chawdiji Kesar Kanwarji of Mansa in Gujarat; Rathorji Pran Deiji of Marwar; Hadiji Ratan Kanwarji of Bundi
- Issue: Jagat Singh I Garib Das; Anoop Kanwarji m.to Amar Singh Rathore of Marwar; Sisodiniji m.to Raja Karan Singh of Bikaner
- Dynasty: Sisodias of Mewar
- Father: Amar Singh I
- Mother: Tomarji Shyam Deiji d.of Yuvraj Shalivahan Singh of Gwalior
- Religion: Hinduism

Maharana Karan Singh II(7 January 1584 – March 1628) was a Sisodia Rajput Rana (ruler) of the Kingdom of Mewar (r. 1620 – 1628). He was the eldest son of Maharana Amar Singh I and the grandson of Maharana Pratap. He was succeeded by his son Jagat Singh I.

== Reign ==
Karan Singh made several administrative and economic reforms after ascending the throne. He divided his kingdom into Parganas and appointed Patels, Patwari, Chawkidars for village administration. He arranged charity, especially for the homeless people to re-establish them in Mewar after decades of conflicts. The Rana also have emphasised on the agricultural and commercial prosperity in the kingdom.

Also, the palaces were upgraded and defenses strengthened by the Rana. He presided in relatively peaceful times and Mewar prospered under his rule. He also renovated the Ranakpur Jain temple in 1621. A lot of construction activities are known to have taken place during Karan Singh's reign. He constructed water ditches that ran all along the walls of the Lake Pichola .These ditches received stormwater and overflow from lake Pichola and conveyed it to lake Udai Sagar from where the stored water was used for irrigation. In Udaipur city, he built the Gol Mahal and dome at Jagmandir Island Palace, along with a tank in Krishna Niwas.

== Relations with the Mughals ==
The relations between the Mughal Empire and the Kingdom of Mewar have been peaceful during the reign of Karan Singh II. He had close ties with Prince Khurram (later, Shah Jahan) which grew due to Khurram's rebellion against his father, Mughal emperor Jahangir. The emperor ordered Khurram to defend the frontier at Kandahar in 1620, when the Mughal garrison was defeated by the Safavids. But the prince disinclined the order and raised a banner of revolt against his father due to some succession disputes of the Mughal throne. First he invaded and plundered the town of Agra in this rebellion, but was defeated by the imperial forces at Bilochpur in 1623. As a result, Khurram retreated to Mandu and subsequently pleaded to the Rana of Mewar to seek shelter. Rana Karan Singh provided him shelter at Delwara house and then Jagmandir Palace.

Karan Singh II Sisodia Rajput Clan Born: 7 January 1584 Died: March 1628
Preceded by Amar Singh I	Sisodia Rajput Ruler; 1620–1628	Succeeded by Jagat Singh II
