= Banera =

- Town
- Location in Rajasthan state of India. Inset shows the Rajasthan within India.
- Coordinates: 25.506677°N 74.675016°E
- Country: India

Languages
- Time zone: UTC+5:30 (IST)

Banera is a town and tehsil located in the Bhilwara district in the state of Rajasthan in India. It is one of the 12 tehsils of the Bhilwara district.

As recorded in Census of India 2011, Bhilwara district came into existence in 1949, which constituted with Banera & Badnor chief ship of Mewar State and merger of Mandalgarh & Shahpura Thikana.

It was built in 1750. There is also different temples e.g. Krishna, Charbujha, Jhalra mahadev, Kavarbavaji, Hanuman, Veer Tejaji etc. The landline code is 01487.

The town has a Government Sr. Secondary School named Akshya Smarak Sr. Secondary School and a Community Health Center.

Banera was also a constituency in the Legislative Assembly of Rajasthan until 2008. Since 2008, it was merged with the Shahpura, Bhilwara constituency by the Delimitation Commission of India.
