= Kaviraj Shyamaldas =

Indian historian (1836–1893)

Kaviraj Mahamahopadhyaya Kaisar-i-Hind Shyamaldas
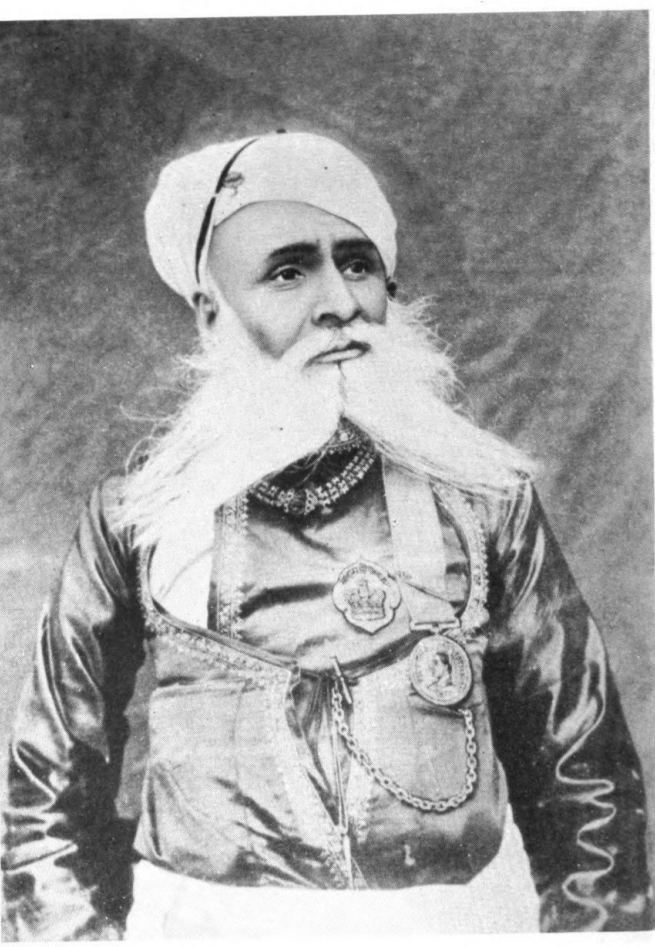
- Kaviraja Shyamaldas portrait at Government of Rajasthan Museum, Udaipur
- Born: 1836; Udaipur, Mewar
- Died: 1893 (aged 56–57); Udaipur
- Occupations: Historian, Prime Minister of Mewar
- Notable work: Vir Vinod
- Title: Mahamahopadhyaya
- Spouse: 2
- Children: 4
- Parents: Kamji Dadhwadiya (father); Aijan Kanwar (mother)
- Honours: Kesar-e-Hind (Lion of India)

Mahamahopadhayaya Kaviraja Shyamaldas Dadhivadia (1836–1893), popularly referred to as Kaviraja (Hindi: king of poets) was one of the early writers involved in documenting the history and culture of what is now Rajasthan region of India.

== Authorship ==
Shyamaldas co-wrote ( with his father Kayamadana Dadhivadia ) the Dipanga Kul Prakash, an extended narrative poem on the Dodia Rajputs of Mewar. Maharana Sajjan Singh, ruler of Udaipur (princely state), assigned Shyamaldas the task of compiling an authentic history of Mewar. Titled Vir Vinod ( Hindi: Heroes' Delight ), this is the earliest known comprehensive history written in Mewar. It reached the public only in 1930 as Maharana Fateh Singh ( Maharana Sajjan Singh's successor) was averse to its publication.

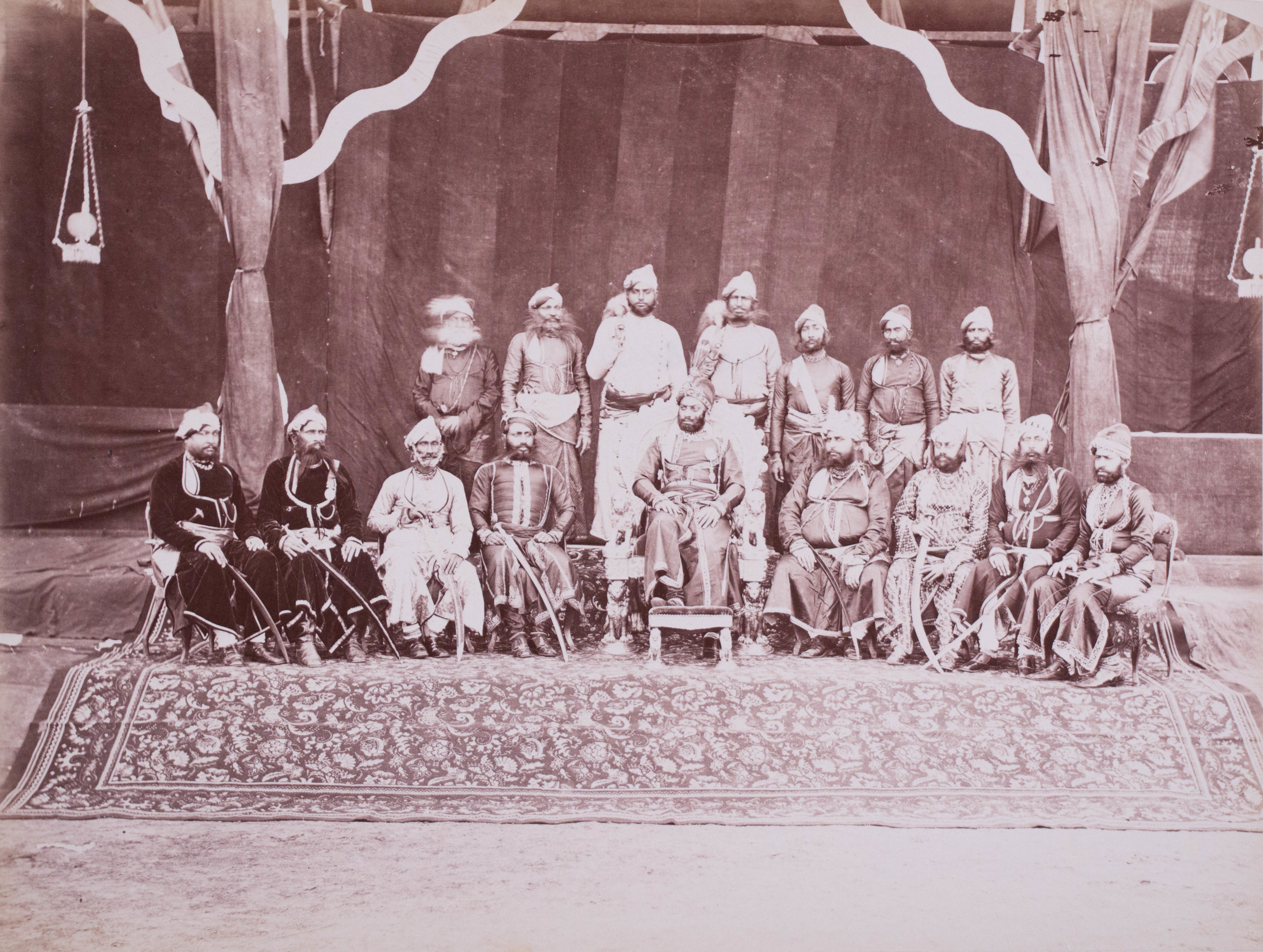
Maharana Sajjan Singh of Udaipur with Sirdars. Kaviraja Shyamaldas: sitting, second from the left c. 1882.

== Negotiator and mentor ==
Shyamaldas was also a confidant of Maharana Sajjan Singh and was entrusted with the delicate negotiations which resulted in a quick end to the Bhil rebellion of 1881. Later, Shyamaldas' pupil, Gaurishankar Hirachand Ojha also became a famed historian and writer.

== Honors and awards ==
Shyamaldas was honored with the degree of Mahamahopadhayaya and conferred with the Kesar-e-Hind ( Lion of India) by the British Government.
