= Bari Sadri =

- Nickname: BSR
- Location in Rajasthan, India Bari Sadri (India)
- Coordinates: 24.42°N 74.47°E
- Country: India
- State: Rajasthan
- District: Chittaurgarh
- Elevation: 489 m (1,604 ft)

Population (2011)
  - Total: 15,713

Languages
  - Official: Hindi, Mewari
- Time zone: UTC+5:30 (IST)

Bari Sadri is a town and a municipality in Chittaurgarh district in the state of Rajasthan, India. It was a feudal state ruled by Rajputs of Jhala clan till 1949.

== History ==
During 15th century, the kingdom of Mewar was divided into 16 Rajwadas, and Bari Sadri was one of those. It was given to Ajja Jhala (deposed king of dhrangadhra) by Rana Raimal in the 1500s. From then until 1949, Bari Sadri was a feudal state, ruled by Jhalas, with the title of "Raj Rana".

== Geography ==
Bari Sadri is located at 24.42°N 74.47°E. It has an average elevation of 279 m (915 ft).

== Demographics ==
As of the 2011 India census, Bari Sadri had a population of 15,713. Males constitute 51% of the population. Bari Sadri has an average literacy rate of 71% with 79% of males and 62% of females are literate. 12% of the population is under 6 years of age.

== Climate ==
The climate of Bari Sadri is generally warm and temperate. It is classified as Cwa (Monsoon-influenced humid subtropical climate) by the Köppen-Geiger system. In Bari Sadri, the average annual temperature is 24.9 °C. The rainfall in Bari Sadri averages 817 mm annually.
