= Bedla =

- neighbourhood
- Location in Rajasthan, India Bedla (India)
- Coordinates: 24°38′41.9382″N 73°40′52.122″E
- Country: India
- State: Rajasthan
- District: Udaipur

Population (2011)
  - Total: 5,766

Languages
  - Official: Hindi, Rajasthani
- Time zone: UTC+5:30 (IST)
- Telephone code: 0294
- Vehicle registration: RJ 27

Bedla is a census town in the Bargaon tehsil of Udaipur district, Rajasthan, India. It is situated near Sukher area, on the Udaipur-Nathdwara highway, around 8 km (5.0 mi) from the city center and around 387 km (240 mi) from the state capital Jaipur. Near Bedla, there is Udaipur Tehsil towards south, Gogunda Tehsil towards west, Khamnor Tehsil towards north and Mavli Tehsil towards east.

== Demographics ==
According to the 2011 Indian census data, Bedla had a population of 5,766 of which 2,991 were males while 2,775 were females. According to same data, female sex ratio was of 928, child sex ratio was around 949 and literacy rate was 88.75%.
