= Kotharia, Rajasthan =

Town in Rajsamand, Rajasthan, India

Kotharia
- town
- Location in Rajasthan, India Kotharia (India)
- Coordinates: 24.58°N 73.52°E
- Country: India
- State: Rajasthan
- District: Rajsamand
- Elevation: 547 m (1,795 ft)

Languages
  - Official: Hindi
- Time zone: UTC+5:30 (IST)
- ISO 3166 code: RJ-IN
- Vehicle registration: RJ-

Kotharia is a town in Rajsamand district of Rajasthan, which was the headquarters of the former 1st class jagir (estate) of the House of Kotharia, part of the Udaipur (Mewar) state, which was in Mewar Residency in Rajputana Agency.

It is situated on the right bank of the Banas River about 50 km northeast of Udaipur, and 5 km from Nathdwara.

== History ==
The first rulers of Kotharia were the descendants of the last Chauhan king of Ranthambhor, Raja Hamir Singh, about 1302. Their descendants settled in Mainpuri in Uttar Pradesh state of present-day India.

During the Battle of Khanwa, when Mughal Emperor Babur fought Maharana Sangram Singh (Rana Sanga) on 17 March 1527, one of them was Manik Chand Chauhan, a chieftain from the village Rajor in present Mainpuri district, Uttar Pradesh, who joined Rana Sanga with his 4,000 men and fought to the death. After the war, he was posthumously rewarded with the jagir of Kotharia and the title of ‘Rawat’. Manik Chand's sons opted to remain in Kotharia and serve Mewar, and were among the first rank of Mewar's nobles (the First 16 Umraos).

In 1802, Rawat Vijay Singh Chauhan fought against Jaswant Rao Holkar's invading army near Nathdwara, when Holkar was on his way to attack ShrinathJi Temple at Nathdwara. Vijay Singh and his men fell in the battle.

Rawat Jodh Singh Chauhan was known to anti-British and he provided refuge to many rebels during rebellion of 1857, including Kushal Singh of Auwa. Peshwa Pandu Rang had also requested him to help mutineers.

In 1901, the town had a population of 1,586 and the estate had 81 villages under it.

== Genealogy ==
1. Rawat Manik Chand Chauhan
2. Rawat Jaipal Chauhan
3. Rawat Sarangdeo Chauhan
4. Rawat Tatar Khan Chauhan
5. Rawat Dharmangad Chauhan
6. Rawat Sahib Khan Chauhan
7. Rawat Prithviraj Chauhan
8. Rawat Rukmangad Chauhan
9. Rawat Udaibhan Chauhan
10. Rawat Devbhan Chauhan
11. Rawat Budh Singh Chauhan
12. Rawat Fateh Singh Chauhan
13. Rawat Vijai Singh Chauhan
14. Rawat Mokham Singh Chauhan
15. Rawat Jodh Singh Chauhan
16. Rawat Sangram Singh Chauhan
17. Rawat Keshri Singh Chauhan
18. Rawat Javan Singh Chauhan
19. Rawat Arjun Singh Chauhan
20. Rawat Man Singh Chauhan
21. Rawat Shivpratap Singh Chauhan
22. Rawat Mahesh Pratap Singh Chauhan.
  1. Kunwar Mrigraj Singh Chauhan
