= Jawasiya-Arni =

- Interactive map of Jawasiya-Arni
- 25°11′29″N 74°31′22″E
- Location: Mewar Plains, South Rajasthan, India
- Region: Rajsamand, Arni, and Chittorgarh districts

Site notes
- Excavation dates: 2014

Jawasiya-Arni is an archaeological site located in the Mewar Plains, in South Rajasthan, India. It is located within the Rajsamand, Arni, and Chittorgarh districts.

== Archaeology ==
The Jawasiya-Arnia site is located in the Mewar Plains. The site was excavated in 2014. Evidence of copper artifacts, places the site within the Chalcolithic period. Other major findings include Black-and-Red ware, distinct of Chalcolithic era South Asia.
