= Devgarh =

Devgarh may refer to:

- Deogarh, Rajasthan, also spelt as Devgarh, a city in Rajsamand District of India's Rajasthan state
- Devgarh, Madhya Pradesh, an historic fortress-city in Chhindwara District of India's Madhya Pradesh state
- Devgarh, Maharashtra, also known as Devgad, a coastal town in Sindhudurg District of India's Maharashtra state
- Deogarh, Uttar Pradesh, a town in Lalitpur district, Uttar Pradesh state of India

== See also ==
- Deogarh (disambiguation)
