= Doduo, India =

Doduo
- Town
- Location in Rajasthan, India Doduo (India)
- Coordinates: 28°19′10″N 74°41′56″E
- Country: India
- State: Rajasthan

Languages
  - Official: Hindi
- Time zone: UTC+5:30 (IST)
- ISO 3166 code: RJ-IN
- Vehicle registration: RJ-

Doduo is a populated place in Churu district, Bikaner Division, Rajasthan, India.
