= Jaitawat =

Subgroup of Rathore dynasty

The Jaitawats are a subgroup of the Rathore Rajputs of India. They are descendants of Rao Jaita Rathore, who fought the historic Battle of Sammel.
