= Thaltej-Jodhpur Tekra =

Historically significant hills in India

The Jodhpur Tekra are a small group of hills located in the south-western part of Ahmedabad in India. These hills are named after the Jodhpur state in Rajasthan.

During Maharaja Abhay Singhji's time, the Jodhpur army attacked the city of Ahmedabad and captured it from its Muslim rulers. All the major thikana's of the Marwar state participated in this war, including the Thakur of Nimaj, the Thakur of Ras, Thakur Abhay Singh of Balunda, and Thakur Kusal Singh of Auwa. Thakur Abhay Singh of Balunda looted Nangara & Nishan from the sultan of Ahmedabad, which was still kept in Balunda Garh, during Holi. Thikana's Damami poured opium water on Nangara in remembrance of the victory; Thakur Aabay Singhji built a gate in the fort called the Fateh pole after this victory.

The area has Sundarvan Mini Zoo.
