= Goram Ghat =

Ghat in Rajasthan, India

Goram Ghatis a scenic mountain pass and an offbeat hill station nestled in the Aravalli Range, located on the border of the Rajsamand and Pali districts in Rajasthan, India.Affectionately dubbed the "Kashmir of Rajasthan" or "Kashmir of Mewar".

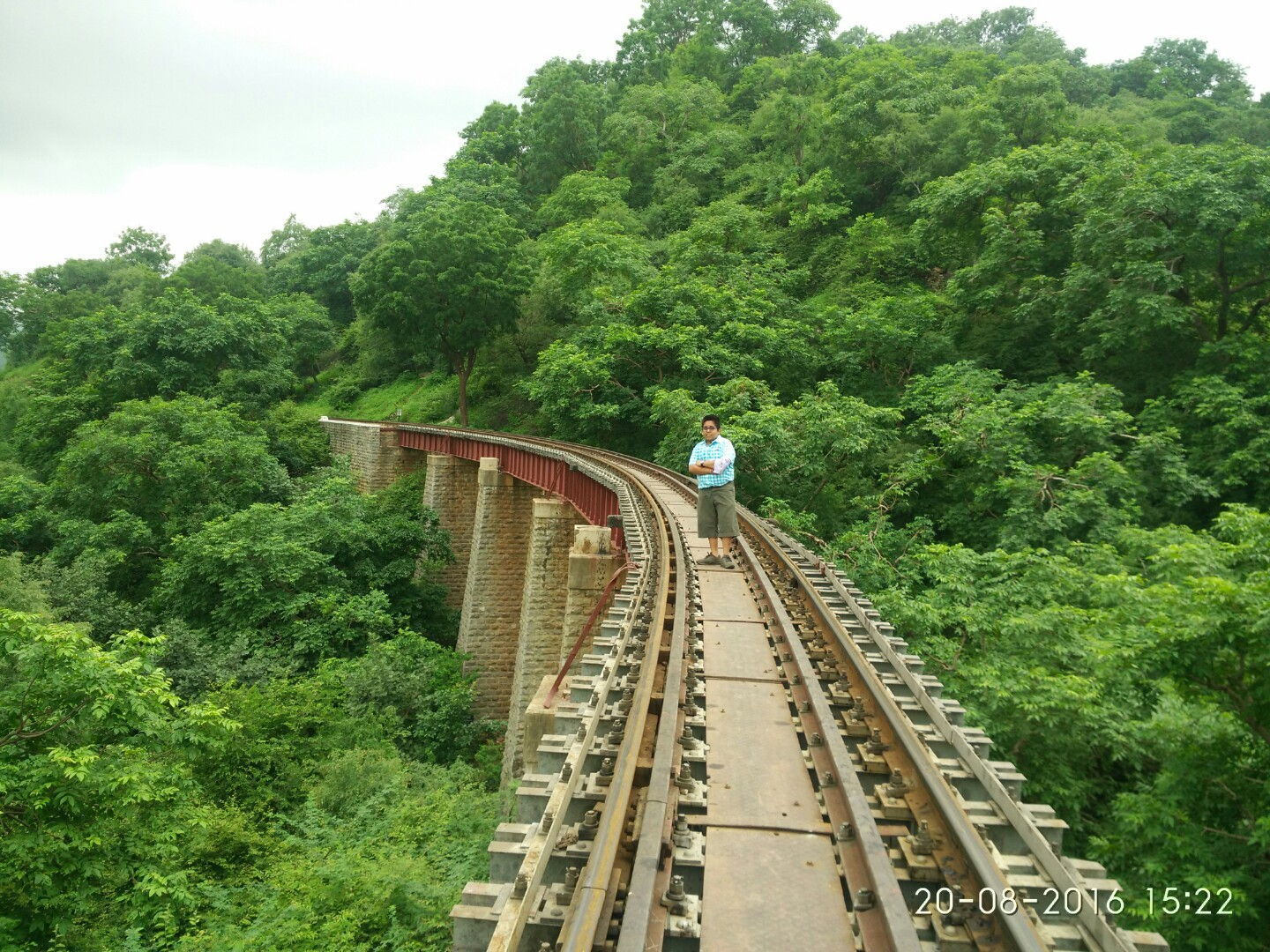
Railway tracks at goram ghat.

== Nature and Wildlife ==
Part of a protected forest area with green trees, hills,lush forests, and vibrant biodiversity and wild animals.

== Train Ride ==
Famous it's historic narrow-gauge train route that passes through various terrain.

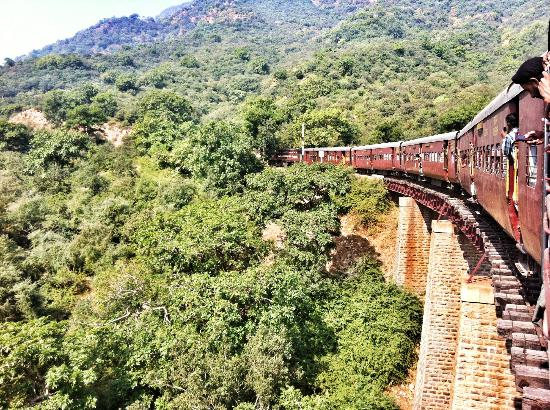
Goram Ghat rail bridge

== Waterfalls ==
Popular spots to see flowing water and natural pools after it rains.It has a beautiful 50-foot-wide waterfall called the Jogmandi Waterfall
