= Todgarh-Raoli Wildlife Sanctuary =

Todgarh-Raoli Sanctuary
- IUCN category IV (habitat/species management area)
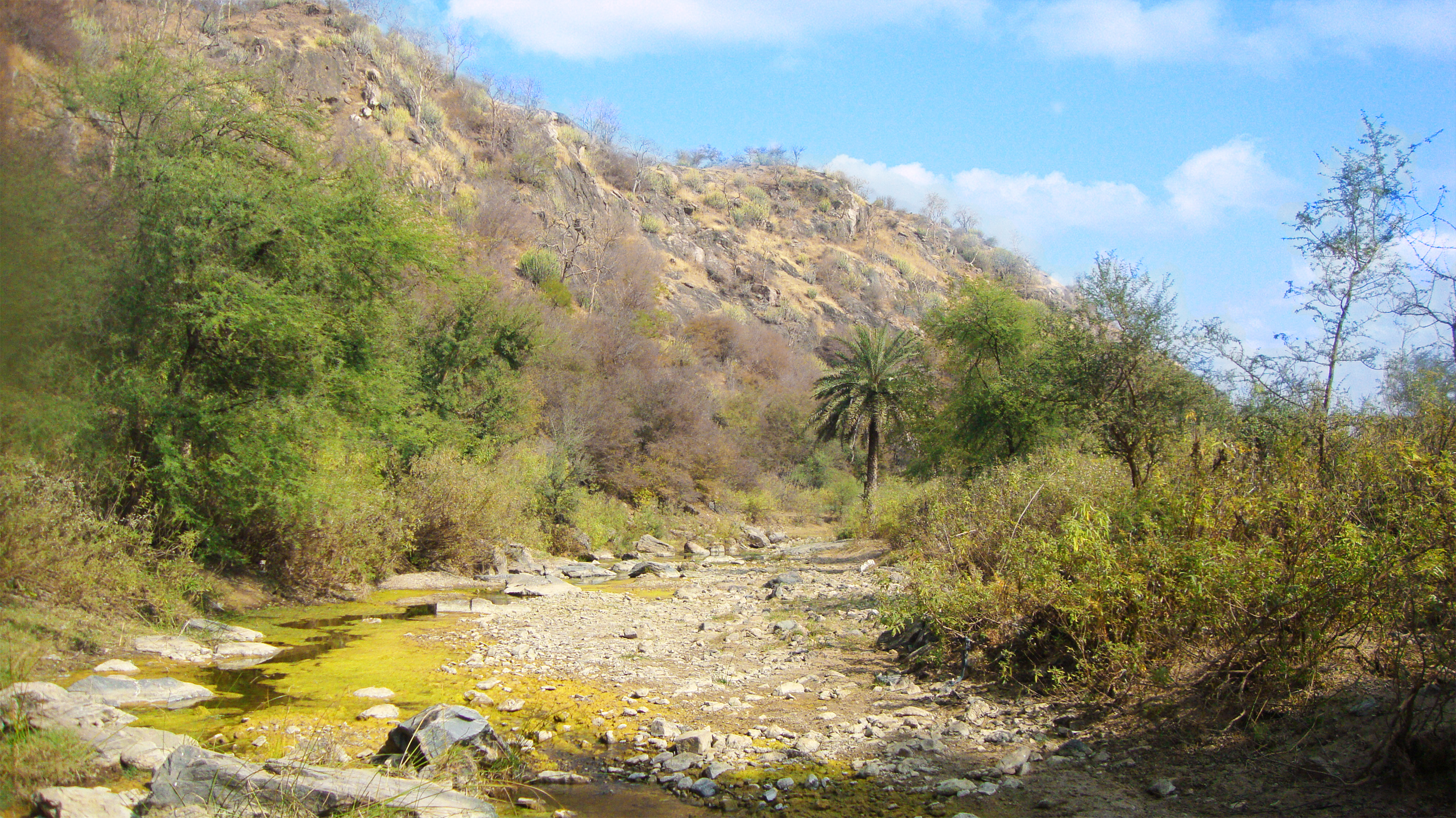
- An inside view of Todgarh-Raoli Sanctuary.

- Location within Rajasthan
- Interactive map of Todgarh-Raoli Sanctuary
- Location: Rajsamand
- Nearest city: Beawar
- Coordinates: 25°39′30″N 73°52′25″E
- Area: 495 sq km
- Established: 1983

Todgarh Raoli Wildlife Sanctuary is a wildlife sanctuary in Rajasthan, India. Spread over the Ajmer, Pali and Rajsamand districts of the state, it was established in 1983. It occupies about 495 km^{2} of tropical deciduous forests and grassland. Major wildlife includes leopard, wild boar, chinkara, common langur, sloth bears and Indian wolf. Also, about 143 bird species were recorded here in the 2013 survey. Nearest major town is Ajmer, which is 105 km away. Ajmer Junction Railway Station and Beawar Railway Station are the nearest railheads.

== Location ==
The sanctuary is situated roughly at the center of the Aravalli hill ranges, being based on the village of Todgarh, 25 km from Jassa Khera on NH-8 Delhi-Udaipur Highway.

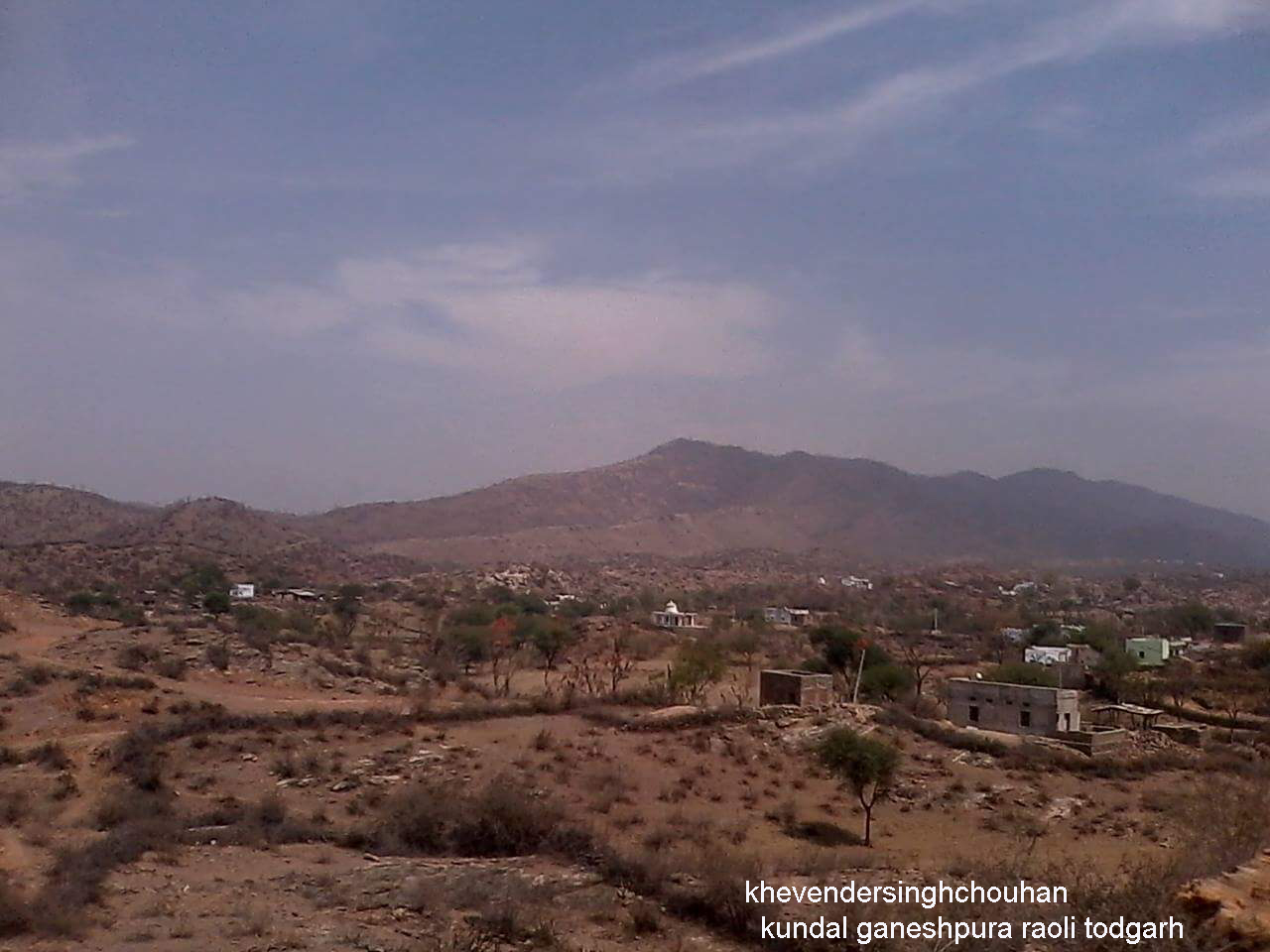
Raoli village in Todgarh-Raoli Wildlife Sanctuary

== Places of Interest ==
=== Dudhaleshwar Temple ===
An ancient temple dedicated to Shiva, surrounded by tall trees of Karanj, Tamarind, and Banyan, attracts tourists. There is a perennial source of spring water in the temple. There is an ancient shivling and the water stream flows from this shivling. That can be seen every season.

=== Kajalwas Dhuni ===
Kajalwas Dhuni is a place of ancient religious importance where nine yogis of the 'Nath' sect have done intense tapasya. It is situated in the lap of Aravalli Range about four kilometers east of Siriyari, Rajasthan, India. This place has the samadhis of nine naths and many devotees visit this place daily to offer their respects at the samadhi.

=== Dewair ===
Dewair is a historical place inside the sanctuary associated with Maharana Pratap. It is the site where he defeated the Mughal army of Akbar. James Tod called it the "Marathon of Mewar" in his book Annals and Antiquities of Rajasthan.

=== Bheelberi falls ===
Inside the sanctuary in Bhagora forest block there is 55-metre high waterfall. Falling of water can be seen in the rainy season. Roosting long-billed vultures and numerous rock beehives on the cliffs just near to it can also be watched. Bheelberi can be approached by a jeep 4 km nature trail.
