= Battle of Sammel =

1544 battle in North India

Date	5 January 1544
Location	Jaitaran, Rajputana, India
Result	Sur victory
Territorial changes	Bikaner and Merta freed from Maldeo and restored to Kalyanmal and Biramdev by Sher Shah.; Ajmer, Jodhpur, Bhangasar, Pali, Phalodi, Sojat, Jalore, Nagaur and territories up to Abu annexed by the Sur Empire.

Belligerents
Sur Empire	Kingdom of Marwar

Commanders and leaders
Sher Shah Suri; Jalal Khan Suri; Khawas Khan Marwat; Isa Khan Niazi	Jaita Rathore †; Kumpa Rathore †

Strength
80,000 horsemen Unknown number of infantry artillery war-elephants and Camel corps	4,000–12,000 Rathore horsemen and archers

Casualties and losses
Thousands	4,000–12,000

The Battle of Sammel, also known as the Battle of Giri-Sumel, took place in 1544. It was fought near the villages of Giri and Sumel, between the Sur Empire under Sher Shah Suri and the Rathore army led by the commanders Jaita and Kumpa of Rao Maldeo Rathore.

== Background ==
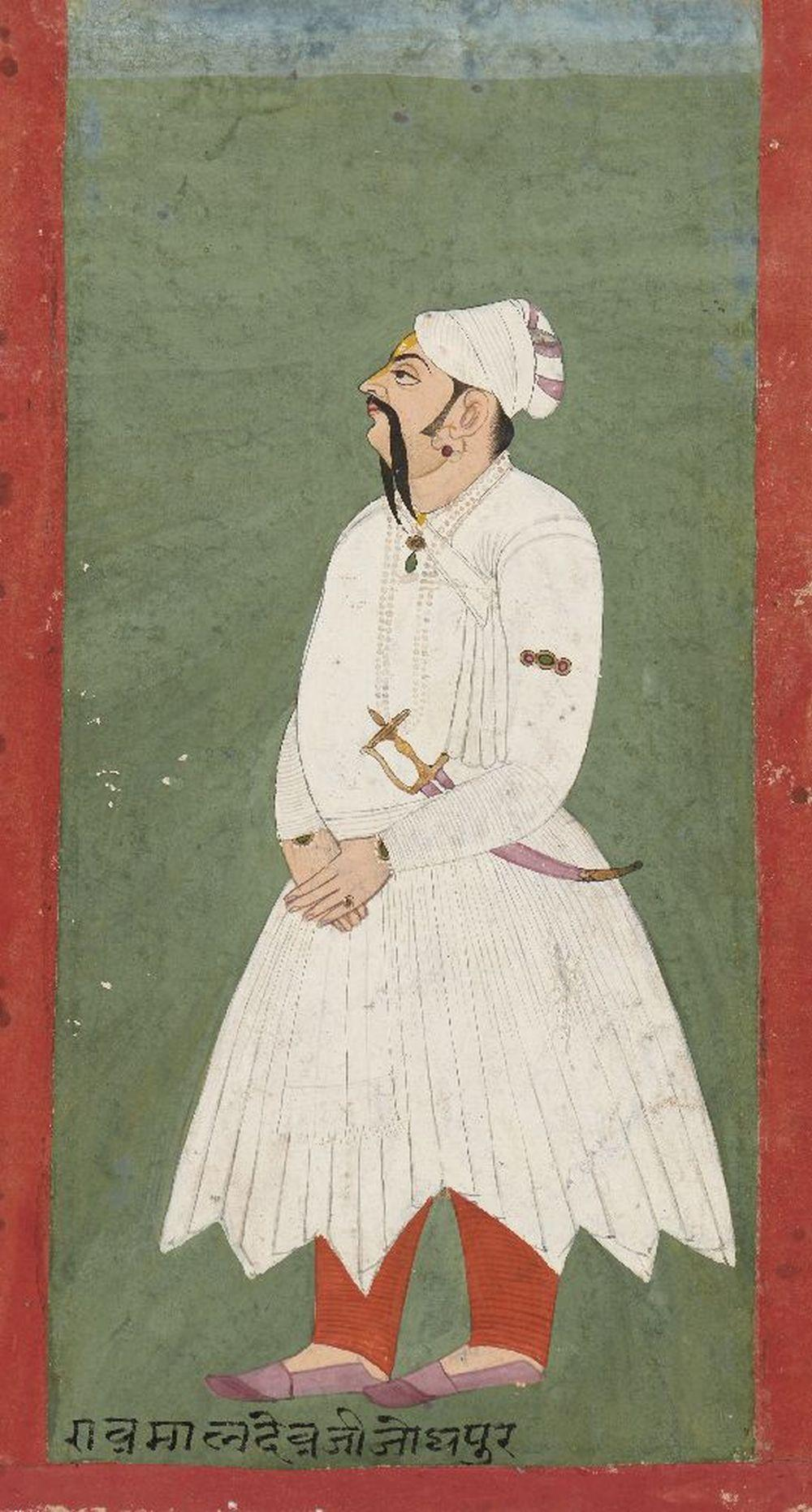
Portrait of Rao Maldeo Rathore. His credential as a ruler were praised by several Persian chronicles of the time like Tabaaq-i-Akbari and Tarik-i-Ferishta composed by Nizammuddin and Ferishta who both acknowledged him as the most powerful monarch in Hindustan.

The Kingdom of Marwar at its greatest extent c. 1539, under Maldeo Rathore

Sher Shah had been secretly preparing for war with Marwar for four months. In 1543, Sher Shah set out against Marwar with a force of 80,000 cavalry. With an army of 50,000, Maldeo advanced to face Sher Shah's army. Sher Shah took the irregular path via Didwana (instead of Bayana). Kumpa had resisted Sher Shah's advance in Shekhawati, after which Sher Shah made sure to entrench at every stop and halted in the village of Sammel in the pargana of Jaitaran, ninety kilometers east of Jodhpur. He entrenched his army with the river Sammel in front of him as a line of defense. Maldeo was surprised by the sudden arrival of his foe and led his army to Girri, which was 12 miles away from Sher Shah's camp. The scrub forest there gave protection to the Marwar army, and thus both armies were well-entrenched. During this time, the dispossessed rulers of Bikaner and Merta came to the aid of Sher Shah. Maldeo remained in a defensive stance during this time as he was suspicious of his barons. Maldeo had recently subjugated them and was therefore cautious about attacking recklessly. Sher Shah also knew that he was in a hostile desert with limited food and water. The digging of trenches had already taken a toll on his Afghan soldiers, who were not used to the terrain. After one month of skirmishing, Sher Shah's position became critical owing to the difficulties of supplying food for his huge army. According to contemporary chroniclers writing in Persian, to resolve this situation, Sher Shah resorted to a shrewd ploy. One evening, he dropped forged letters near Maldeo's camp in such a way that they were sure to be intercepted. These letters indicated, falsely, that some of Maldeo's army commanders were promising assistance to Sher Shah. This caused great consternation to Maldeo, who immediately (and wrongly) suspected his commanders of disloyalty. Maldeo left for Jodhpur on 4 January 1544 with his own men, abandoning his commanders to their fate.

== Battle ==
When Maldeo's loyal generals Jaita and Kumpa found out what had happened, they were worried about how they would prove their loyalty. When the king ordered a withdrawal, the chieftains decided that they would not leave the field even though they had only a few thousand men against an enemy force of 80,000 men, cannons and war elephants. Jaita said that the land they were leaving had been won and protected by their ancestors and they must not flee. In the ensuing battle of Sammel, Jaita, Kumpa and other chieftains attacked Sher Shah's centre wreaking havoc in his ranks. Sher Shah reacted to the charge by sending war elephants and reinforcements under Jalal Khan. The Afghans soon used their superior numbers and guns to overpower the attack. The battle continued until the Rathores were slain to the last man. The Afghan victory was hard-won and gave birth to the famous Persian recorded quote about Sher Shah exclaiming that "for a handful of millet, I almost lost the Empire of Hindustan."

According to Satish Chandra -

Sher Shah's oft quoted remark "I had given away the country of Delhi for a handful of millets" is a tribute to the gallantry of Jaita and Kumpa and the willingness of the Rajputs to face death even in the face of impossible odds.

== Aftermath ==
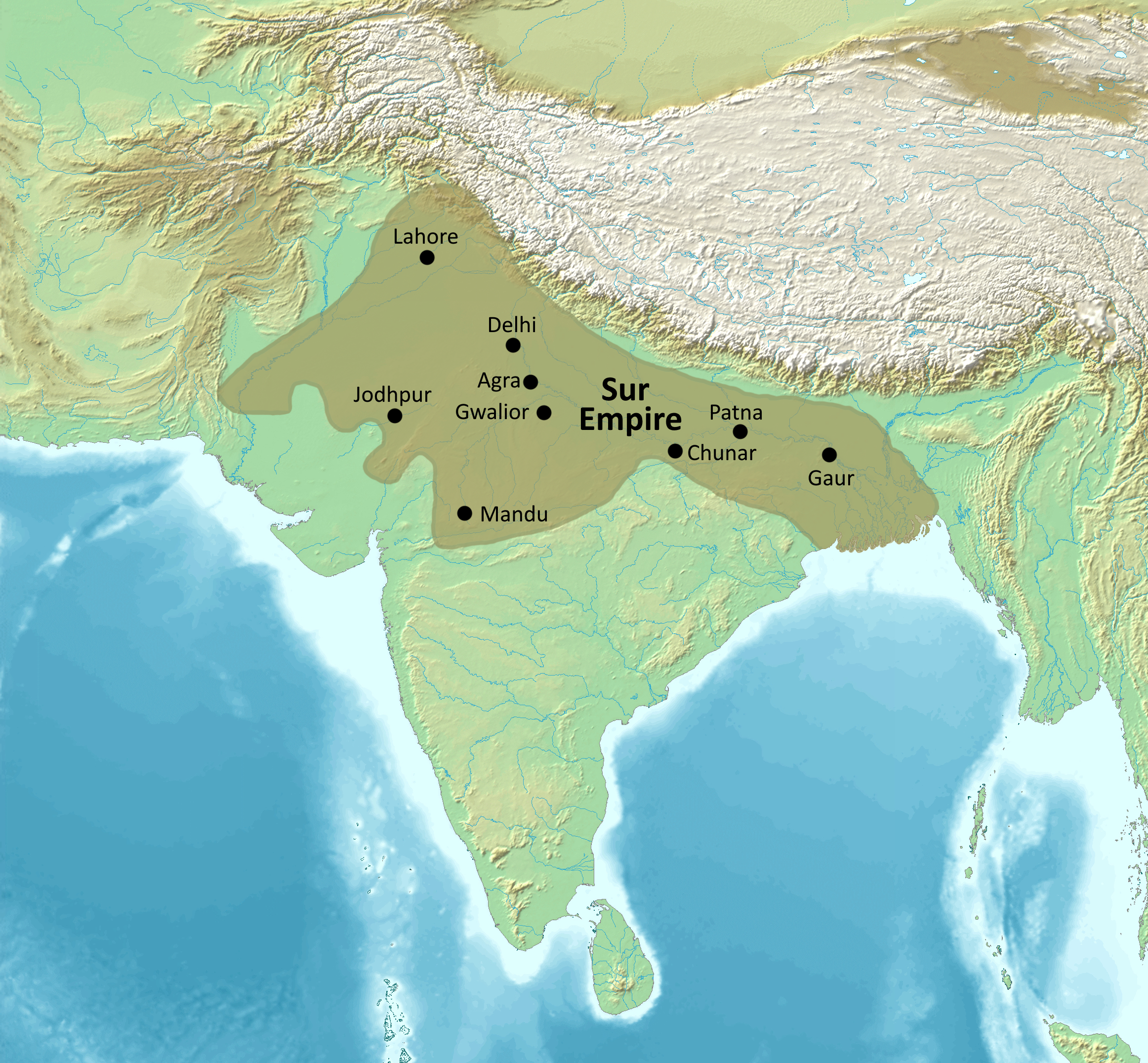
Map of the Sur Empire at its greatest height

After this victory, Sher Shah's general Khawas Khan Marwat took possession of Jodhpur and occupied the territory of Marwar from Ajmer to Mount Abu in 1544. Maldeo was initially forced to retreat to Siwana, however after the death of Sher Shah he was able to recapture Jodhpur by July 1545 and the rest of his territories by 1546. In doing so he had to defeat the chain of garrisons that had been posted by Sher Shah before his death.

== See also ==
- Rao Maldeo Rathore
- Nimaj
- Battles of Rajasthan

== Sources ==
- Chandra, Satish (2005). Medieval India: From Sultanat to the Mughals. Vol. II. Har-Anand Publications.
- Kalika Ranjan Qanungo (1965). Sher Shah and his times. Orient Longmans
- Mahajan, V. D. (2007). History of Medieval India. New Delhi: S. Chand
- Rottermund, H. K. (1998). A History of India. London: Routledge.
