= Kankroli =

City in Rajasthan, India

Kankroli (Rajsamand)
- town
- Location in Rajasthan, India Kankroli (Rajsamand) (India)
- Coordinates: 25.0667°N 73.8833°E
- Country: India
- State: Rajasthan
- District: Rajsamand
- Elevation: 546 m (1,791 ft)

Population
  - Total: 67,798

Languages
  - Official: Mewari, Hindi
- Time zone: UTC+5:30 (IST)
- Postal code: 313324
- Lok Sabha constituency: Rajsamand (Lok Sabha constituency)

Kankroli is a town located in the Rajsamand district of Rajasthan, India. It forms a twin town with Rajnagar. Together, these two towns constitute the Rajsamand Nagar Parishad (municipal council), which serves as the district headquarters. The municipality and district take their name from the historic Rajsamand Lake—an artificial lake built by Maharana Raj Singh I, rather than a pre-existing town.

Located about 42 miles (68 km) north of Udaipur, Kankroli sits along the southern edge of the lake. It is widely known for its beautiful Dwarkadhish Temple devoted to Lord Krishna.

== History ==
Kankroli was an Jagir in the erstwhile Mewar state, consisting of 21 villages, granted to Gosain of the Dwarkadhish ji Temple as free grant. Dwarkadhish ji temple is 3rd peeth of Shuddhadvaita pushtimarg found by Jagadguru Vallabhcharyaji. Dwarkadhish ji was brought to Mewar in 1669 AD by descendants of Vallabhcharya and in 1671 AD village of Asotiya was granted to construct temple for Dwarkadhish ji. After construction of Rajsamand was completed in 1676 AD, Dwarkadhish ji Temple was shifted to its current location. Dwarkadheesh ji Temple is Third Peeth of Vallabh Sampraday.

== Demographics ==
As per Census India 2011, the Rajsamand Nagar Parishad has a population of 67798 in 2011.

Population Growth of Rajsamand Nagar Parishad (1951–2011)
Year	Population
1951	5,432
1961	11,272
1971	14,242
1981	27,492
1991	38,831
2001	55,687
2011	67,798

== Civic administration ==
Rajsamand municipal board was created in 1956, which was promoted to Rajsamand Nagar Parishad in 2012.

== Transportation ==
The town lies on NH-48 (old NH-8) Udaipur-Ajmer. Kankroli is a railway station on the meter gauge route between Mavali-Marwar Junction.

== Economy ==
Kankroli is famous for the JK Tyre plant, which is one of the leading Tyre Manufacturers in India. A whole village is named after it known as JayKay Gram. The city is emerging as an administrative co-industrial center, with increasing businesses related to building materials and marble.
