= Deogarh =

Deogarh may refer to:

Location

- Debagarh, Odisha, also known as Deogarh, a city in Debagarh District, India
  - Deogarh (Lok Sabha constituency), abolished in 2008
  - Deogarh (Vidhan Sabha constituency)
- Deoghar, Jharkhand, also known as Deogharh, a city in India, home to the Vaidyanath temple
- Deogarh, Madhya Pradesh, also known as Devgarh, a historic fortress-city in Chhindwara District of India's Madhya Pradesh state
- Devgarh, Maharashtra, also known as Deogarh or Devgad, a coastal city in Sindhudurg District of India's Maharashtra state
- Deogarh, Rajasthan, also known as Devgarh, a city and fortress in Rajsamand District of India's Rajasthan state
- Deogarh, Uttar Pradesh, a temple city in Lalitpur District of India's Uttar Pradesh state

Monument

- Deogarh temple, a historically important Indian temple dated to about 500 CE

== See also ==
- Devgarh (disambiguation)
