= Dwarkadhish Kankroli =

Hindu temple in Kankroli

Dwarkadhish Temple, Kankroli
- Dwarkadhish Temple Gate, Kankroli

Religion
- Affiliation: Hinduism
- District: Rajsamand
- Deity: Dwarkadhish (form of Krishna)
- Festivals: Janmashtami, Holi, Diwali etc.

Location
- Location: Kankroli
- State: Rajasthan
- Country: India

Architecture
- Type: Mewar architecture
- Creator: Maharana Raj Singh of Mewar
- Completed: 1676

Website
- https://www.shrinathjihelpline.com/dwarkadhish-temple-rajsamand-nathdwara.html

Dwarkadhish Ji is a Hindu Temple, situated on the southern bank of the Rajsamand lake in Kankroli. The temple commands a very fine view of the lake. This temple is built by Maharana Raj Singh of Mewar temple is dedicated to Dwarkadhish Ji, one of the seven swaroops of Pushtimarg of Vallabhacharya.

== History ==
In 1956, the Śrī Dvārakādhīśa kī prākaṭya vārtā was published by Vidyā Vibhāg in Kankaroli. This Braj Bhasha text was written by Brajabhūṣaṇa Gosvāmī. The introduction states that the original version of the text was composed in the 1700s. The text details the legends that the Dvārakādhīśa image was worshipped by a series of sages and Hindu mythological figures before being worshipped by the family of Vallabha.

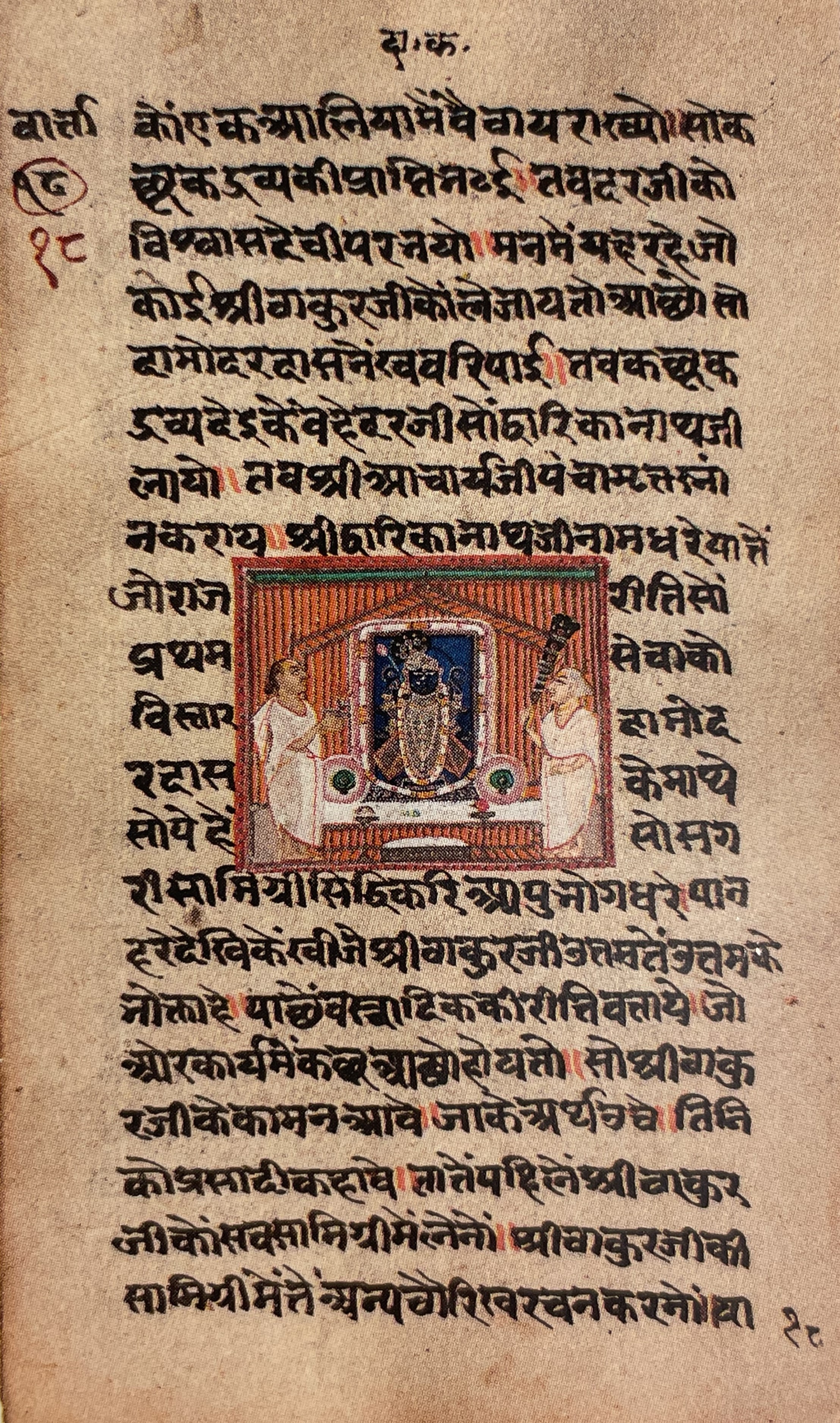
Dāmodaradāsa Kṣatriya performing sevā to Dvārakādhīśa from an illustrated Caurāsī Vaiṣṇavana kī Vārtā manuscript.

According to the vārtā literature, Vallabha acquired Dvārakādhīśa/Dvārakānātha from Nārāyaṇadāsa Darjī of Kannauja. Vallabha then entrusted Dvārakādhīśa to his servant Dāmodaradāsa Kṣatriya, upon whose death the image was returned to Vallabha's house in Aṛaila. Later, Vallabha's son Viṭṭhalanātha took Dvārakādhīśa to Gokula. After Viṭṭhalanātha raised his family, he partitioned various Kr̥ṣṇa idols in his possession among his sons, of which his third son Bālakr̥ṣṇa (1549–1588) was entrusted the worship of Dvārakādhīśa.

Viṭṭhalanātha's sixth son Yadunātha received the worship of the image Bālakr̥ṣṇa. However, Yadunātha was disappointed at Bālakr̥ṣṇa's small size, thus his elder brother Bālakr̥ṣṇa suggested to Viṭṭhalanātha that the two deities should be worshipped jointly by the two brothers. Viṭṭhalanātha agreed on the condition that Yadunātha's descendants at anytime could worship Bālakr̥ṣṇa independently if they so desired.

Bālakr̥ṣṇa's eldest son Dvārakeśa (1572–1613) and Yadunātha's son Madhusūdana both initially lived and worshipped their deities together after their respective father's deaths. However, Madhusūdana soon desired to worship Bālakr̥ṣṇa independently to which Dvārakeśa disagreed. The matter was brought to their uncle, Gokulanātha, who reiterated Viṭṭhalanātha's order that the descendants of Yadunātha had the right to worship Bālakr̥ṣṇa independently if and when they desired. After a year of serving Bālakr̥ṣṇa by himself, Madhusūdana returned Bālakr̥ṣṇa back to Dvārakeśa. According to Shastri, Bālakr̥ṣṇa himself desired to be reunited with Dvārakādhīśa; according to Entwistle and Peabody, Madhusūdana desired to return the deity with Peabody stating Balakr̥ṣṇa was "spurned". Dvārakeśa accepted Bālakr̥ṣṇa on the condition that Madhusūdana would not ask for it back, to which Gokulanātha drafted a written contract which was signed by the parties. Madhusūdana was instead given the deity Kalyāṇarāya, who was not only larger than Bālakr̥ṣṇa, but considered by some to have been worshipped by Vallabha despite not being an original navnidhi.

After Dvārakeśa, his eldest surviving son Giridhara (1605–1661) acquired the service of Dvārakādhīśa and Bālakr̥ṣṇa. Giridhara had a son, Dvārakānātha (1625–1658), and a daughter, Gaṁgā Beṭī. Dvārakānātha's wife's name was Jānakī Bahū. Dvārakānātha, seeking to increase his knowledge, left Gokul for Kashi. There during a solar eclipse, he stood in the Ganges river and inscribed the Sarasvatī mantra on his tongue. After studying in the city for several years, Dvārakānātha returned to Gokul and had a dream in which Kr̥ṣṇa informed him he had committed the fault of anyāśraya by seeking the refuge of Sarasvatī and was thus now longer fit for his service. Dvārakānātha decided to immediately retire to the wilderness from which he was not heard from again. Some sources also state Giridhara himself was considered unworthy for service.

During the time of Giridhara in 1644, the mahārāṇā of Udaipur (Udayapura), Jagatasiṁha I, came to the Braj region for pilgrimage. After touring various temples, he was impressed by the service rendered to Dvarakādhīśa and became a disciple of Giridhara and granted him the village of Āsoṭiyā in Mewar.

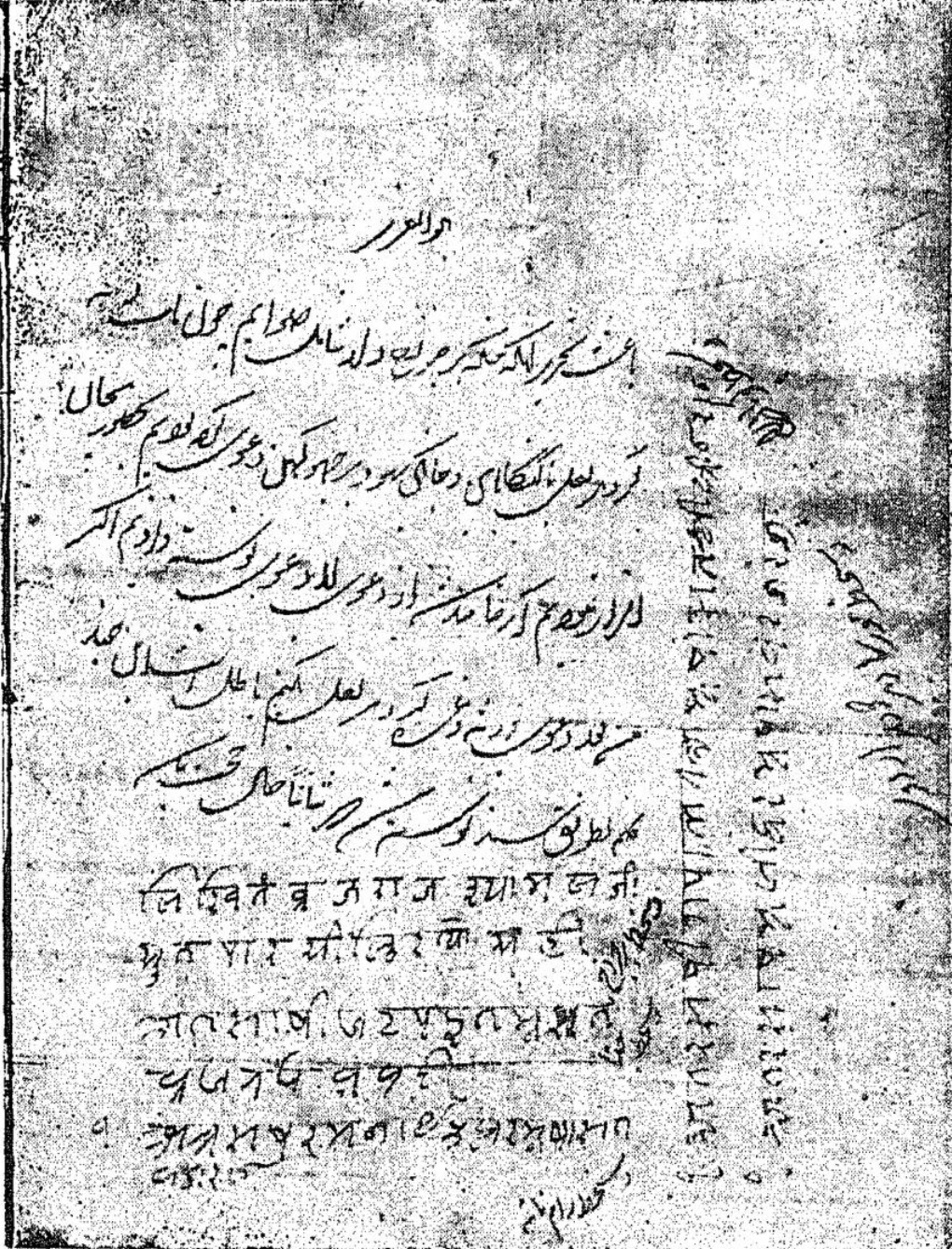
Quittance signed by Brajarāya from his first failed legal battle against Brajabhūṣaṇa

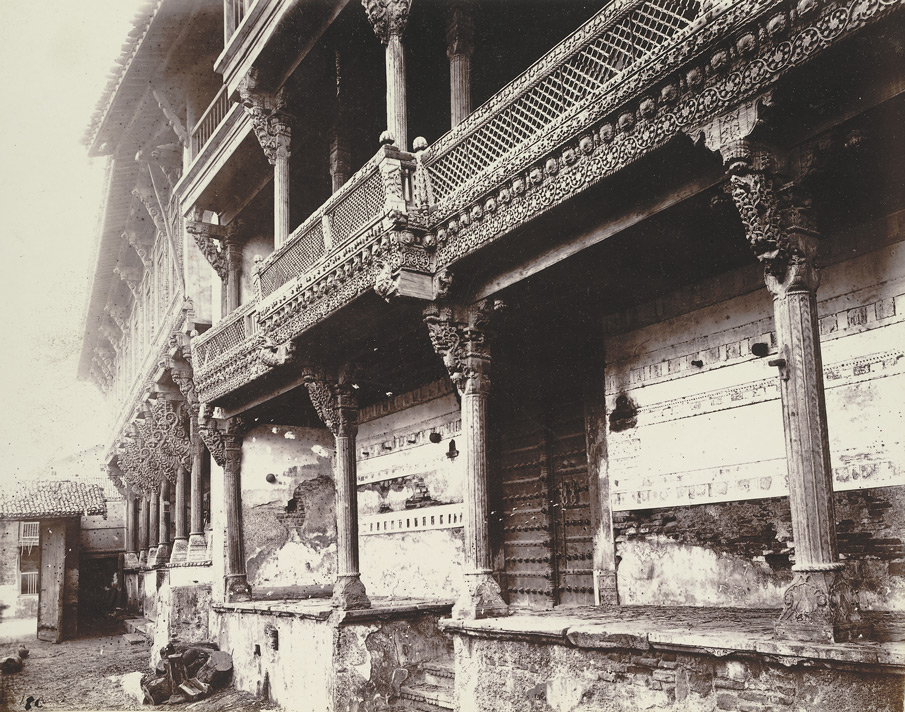
1880s photograph of the house in Ahmedabad where Dvārakādhīśa and Bālakr̥ṣṇa were worshipped, currently used as a haveli-temple.

Due to the incident with Dvārakānātha, Giridhara or his daughter-in-law Jānakī adopted a distant nephew named Brajabhūṣaṇa (born Prāṇavallabha) in 1660. Brajabhūṣaṇa (1643–1701) was the son of Śrīvallabha and the great-grandson of Brajabhūṣaṇa, who was the third son of Bālakr̥ṣṇa, the founder of the Third House (there being no other surviving descendants of Bālakr̥ṣṇa's first and second sons). Giridhara soon died, and with Brajabhūṣaṇa being a minor, the service of Dvārakādhīśa and Bālakr̥ṣṇa and ancestral property was managed by Gaṁgā Beṭī and Jānakī Bahū. The adoption was challenged by their uncle Brajarāya of Kāśī, the son of Śyāmalāla and the grandson of Pītāmbara (the fourth son of Bālakr̥ṣṇa), who considered himself higher in succession to Brajabhūṣaṇa and demanded the seat of the house. He took the matter to Mughal court in Agra (Āgarā), where he lost and had to sign a deed-of-release acknowledging Brajabhūṣaṇa as the rightful heir. Upon returning to Gokul, Brajarāya hired a band of thieves to steal Dvārakādhīśa, Bālakr̥ṣṇa, and a pair of sandals that had belonged to Vallabha in the middle of the night and took them all to Agra. Gaṁgā Betī and the rest went to Agra, where with the help of Mughal authorities, the idols were returned. The date in 1663 on which the deities were returned is celebrated in the Third House as the Pāṭotsava of Dvārakādhīśa. Feeling insecure in Gokul, Gaṁgā and her party decided to quit Gokul for Ahmedabad (Ahmadabāda) aka Rājanagara where they could worship in peace. In the meantime, Brajarāya began to consistently attend the court of the emperor Aurangzeb. It was also during this time that Brajabhūṣaṇa finally received a formal copper plate grant for the village of Āsoṭiyā from Mahārāṇā Rājasiṁha I, son and successor of Jagatasiṁha. Eventually Brajarāya was able to get a moment alone with Aurangzeb during a hunt in a jungle c. 1668. After pleasing the thirsty emperor with a glass of water, he was able to get a written order from Aurangzeb that he should be granted ownership of Bālakr̥ṣṇa. Brajarāya arrived in Ahmedabad in 1669 and spend months searching for where Dvārakādhīśa and Bālakrṣṇa were secretly being worshipped. Eventually locating the house (in Raipur/Rāyapura), with the aid of imperial troops, he forcefully entered the basement where the idols were being worshipped and seized Bālakr̥ṣṇa who was being rocked in a cradle by Gaṁgā Beṭī, Jānakī, and Brajabhūṣaṇa. Brajarāya then took Bālakr̥ṣṇa to Surat (Sūrata), where his descendants would make a rival claim to the title of the Sixth House, based on the fact they held the deity first bestowed upon Yadunātha. There exists a Gujarati treaty between all parties and the famous Harirāya that ended the conflict status quo post bellum, which may have been forged by Brajarāya himself. Brajabhūṣaṇa decided to leave Mughal provinces, and settled in the kingdom of Mewar.

Originally, Dwarkadhish Ji temple was in Gokul. During Mughal rule, temples were threatened with frequent invasions, vandalism and arson. Dwarkadhish ji, was also exposed to this danger. Apprehending danger to Dwarkadhish Ji, Goswami Girdharji took the deity with him to Ahmedabad. Due to apprehension there as well, he was invited to Mewar in 1671 AD.

Maharana Raj Singh granted village of Asotiya for Dwarkadhish Ji. Temple was constructed in Asotiya. After Rajsamand Lake was built, due to heavy rainfall, the Aasotia temple was flooded and the temple became islet. MaharajKumar AmarSingh allocated Darikhana and Haveli's high ground for construction of new temple of DwarkadhishJi.

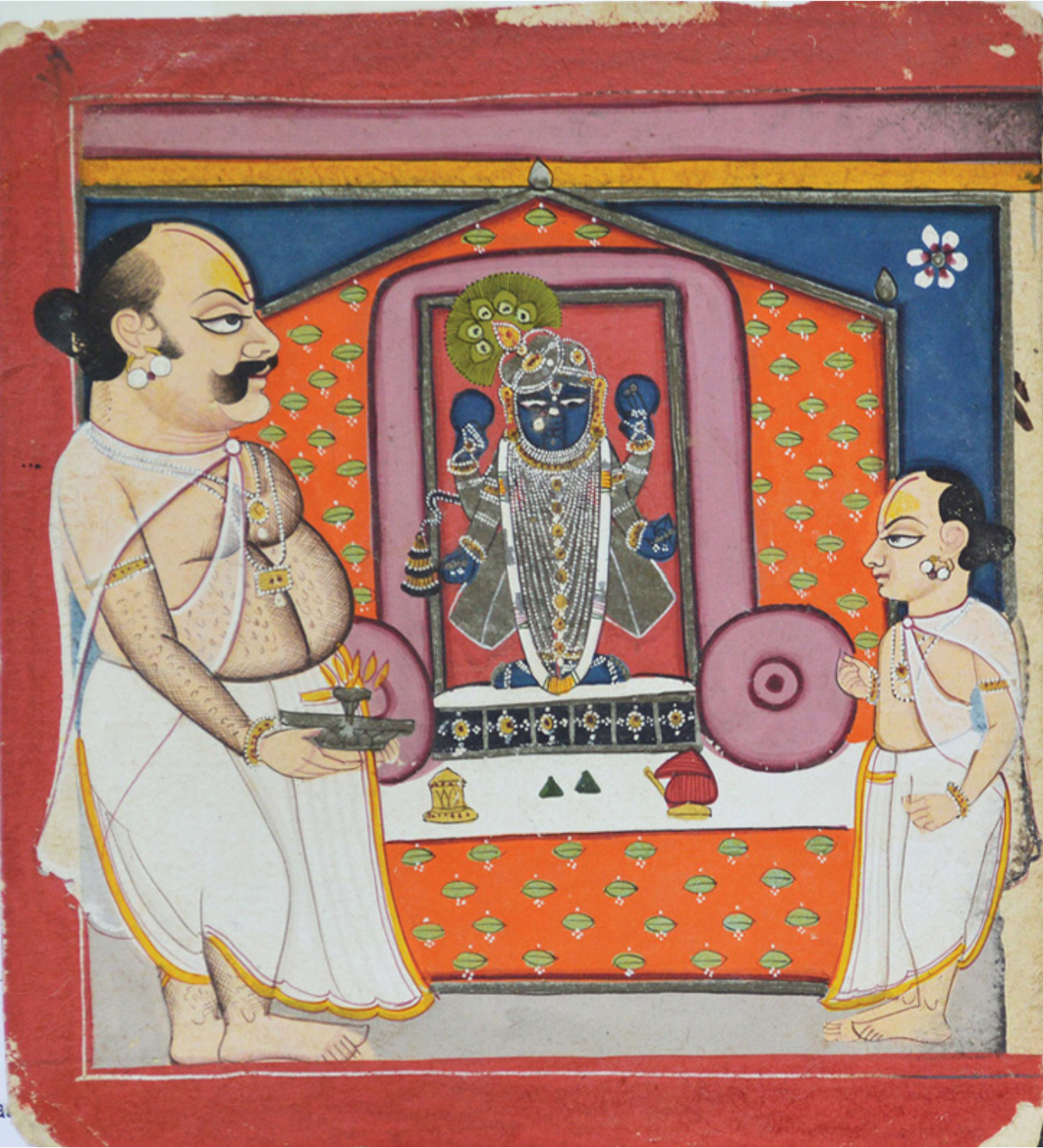
Dvārakādhīśa of Kāṁkarolī worshipped by Viṭṭhalanātha Mahārāja and an attendant, c. 1750

Temple is built in haveli form and beauty of the temple tends to be enhanced because of the lush greenery of the surroundings. More and more additions were done to the temple complex over the time. The temple sits on the high bank of Rajsamand Lake. The shikhar is generally a noticeable characteristic decorated with various sculptures. The priest and attendants of the temples are Gosains, whose ancestors were Brijwasis. (inhabitants of Brij).

Darshan of the deity is available in following aartis:

- Morning Mangla
- Shringar
- Gwal
- Raj Bhog
- Utthapan
- Bhog
- Arti
- Sahyan.

People from every corner of the country come here for Darshan.

== Festivals ==
Festivals are held in the tradition of Pushtimarg.

- Janamashtami
- Nanda Mahotsava
- Deepawali
- Annkuta
- Patotsava
- Phag in Phalgun month
- Holi
- Dolotsava
- Ramnavmi
- Akshai Tritiya
- Various Ratha Yatras
