= Beawar District =

District of Rajasthan, India

- District
- Location of Beawar district in Rajasthan
- Coordinates (Ajmer): 26°27′N 74°38′E
- Country: India
- State: Rajasthan
- Division: Ajmer
- Headquarters: Beawar

Beawar is a district in the state of Rajasthan in northern India, whose district headquarters is Beawar city. Beawar district was established on 7 August 2023. It's belongs to Ajmer Division.

== Sub Division ==
Beawar District is Divided into 6 Tehsils:

- Beawar - This is the main tehsil and also the district headquarters.
- Jaitaran
- Raipur
- Vijainagar
- Badnor
- Masuda
- Todgarh

Neighbour Districts: Ajmer, Bhilwara, Rajsamand, Pali, Jodhpur, Nagaur
