= Railmagra tehsil =

Town in Rajasthan, India

Railmagra is a town in Railmagra Tehsil in Rajsamand District in Rajasthan state in India.

Railmagra is 24.6 km from its district headquarter Rajsamand. It is 271 km from its state's capital Jaipur.

Nearby villages include Kuraj (6 km), Sakarawas (6.3 km), Sadri (6.3 km), Sindesar Kalan (6.5 km), and Jeetawas (7.1 km). Nearest towns are Railmagra (0 km), Rajsamand (28.1 km), Amet (36.9 km), Khamnor (41.5 km). Rajpura-Dariba, Chokri, Dhaneriya, Charana, Gilund, Gogathala and Jawasiya are some of other villages.

== Villages in Railmagra tahsil ==
Amarpura,
Anjana,                       
Ardakiya,
Bakhantpura,
Bakhatpura,
Bamniya Kalan,
Banediya,
Bethumbi,
Bhama Khera,
Bharai,
Bhoorwara,
Chanpa Kheri,
Charana,
Chawandiya,
Chhapri,
Chhdanga Ka Khera,
Chhdanga Kheri,
Chhtri Khera,
Chokdi,
Damodarpura,
Dariba, (CT)
Dhaneriya,
Dheeli,
Dolatpura,
Gamerpura,
Ganeshpura,
Ganeshpura,
Gangas,
GAWARDI,
Gilund,
Gogathala,
Jagatsingh Ji Ka Khera,
Jagpura,
Jawasya,
Jeetawas,
Jeewa Khera,
Joonda,
Joonda Ki Kheri,
Kabra,
Karma Kheri,
Karoliya,
Katiya Khera,
Khandel,
Khar Bamaniya,
Khatookra,
Kolpura,
Kotrii,
Kundiya,
Kuraj,
Ladpacha,
Lakhmipura,
Lapasiya Khera,
Lathiya Kheri,
Laxmipura,
Madara,
Mahenduriya,
Makhanpuriya,
Mali Khera,
Mali Khera,
Mataji Ka Khera,
Mau,
Mega Khera,
Meniya,
Morra,
Nataji Ka Khera,
Ora,
Pachhmata,
Panotiya,
Peepali Aheeran,
Peepali Dodiyan,
Peepawas,
Pema Khera,
Phoonkiya,
Prempura,
Railmagra,
Rajpura,
Rampuriya,
Sadri,
Sakarawas,
Sansera,
Sanwaliya Khera,
Sanwalpura,
Sarwariya Kheri,
Shivpura,
Shoupura,
Sindesar Kalan,
Sindesarkhurd,
Soniyana,
Sunariya Khera,
Tara Khera,
Turkya Kheri,
Udalpura
