= Rajsamand district =

- District of Rajasthan
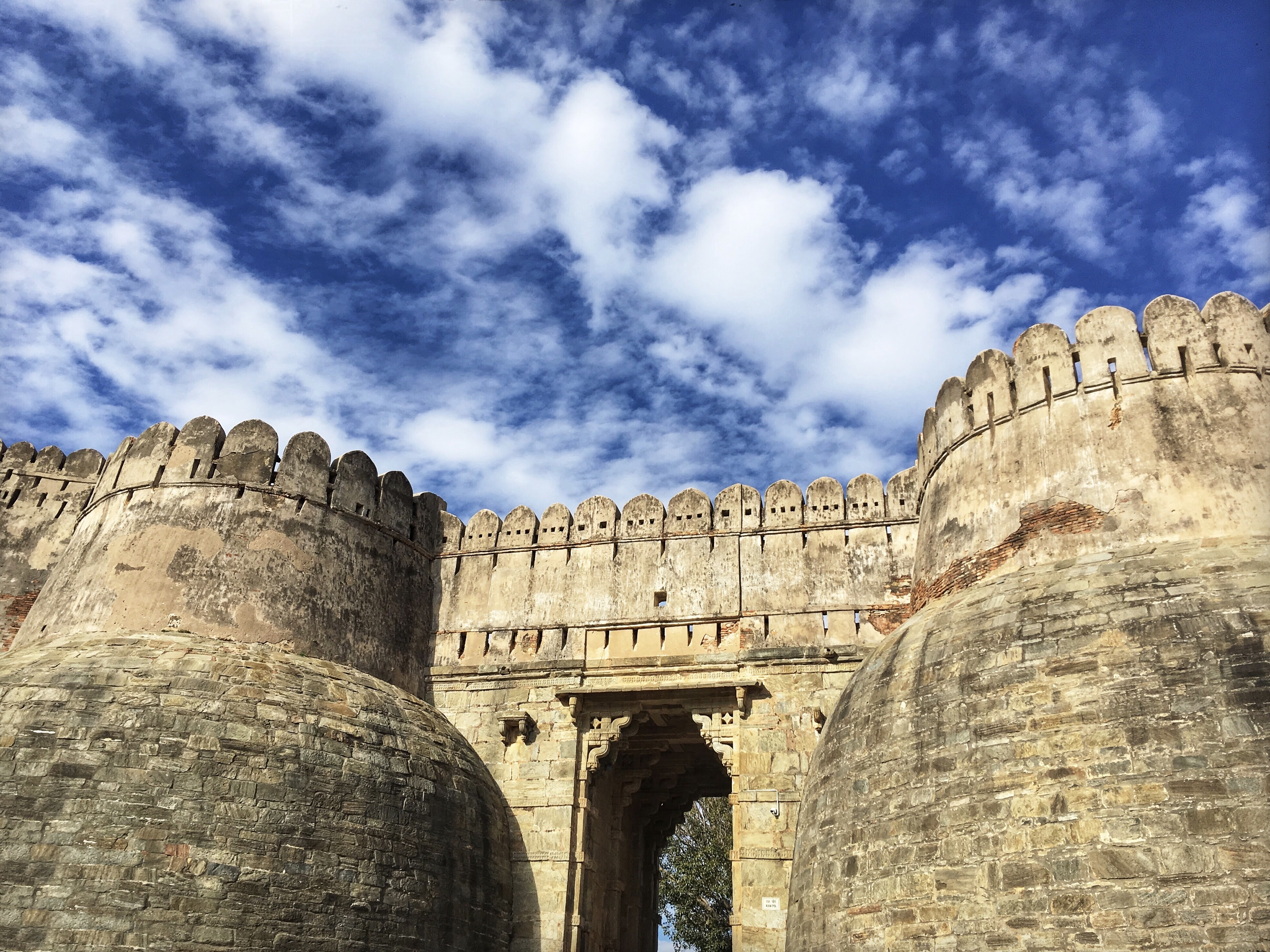
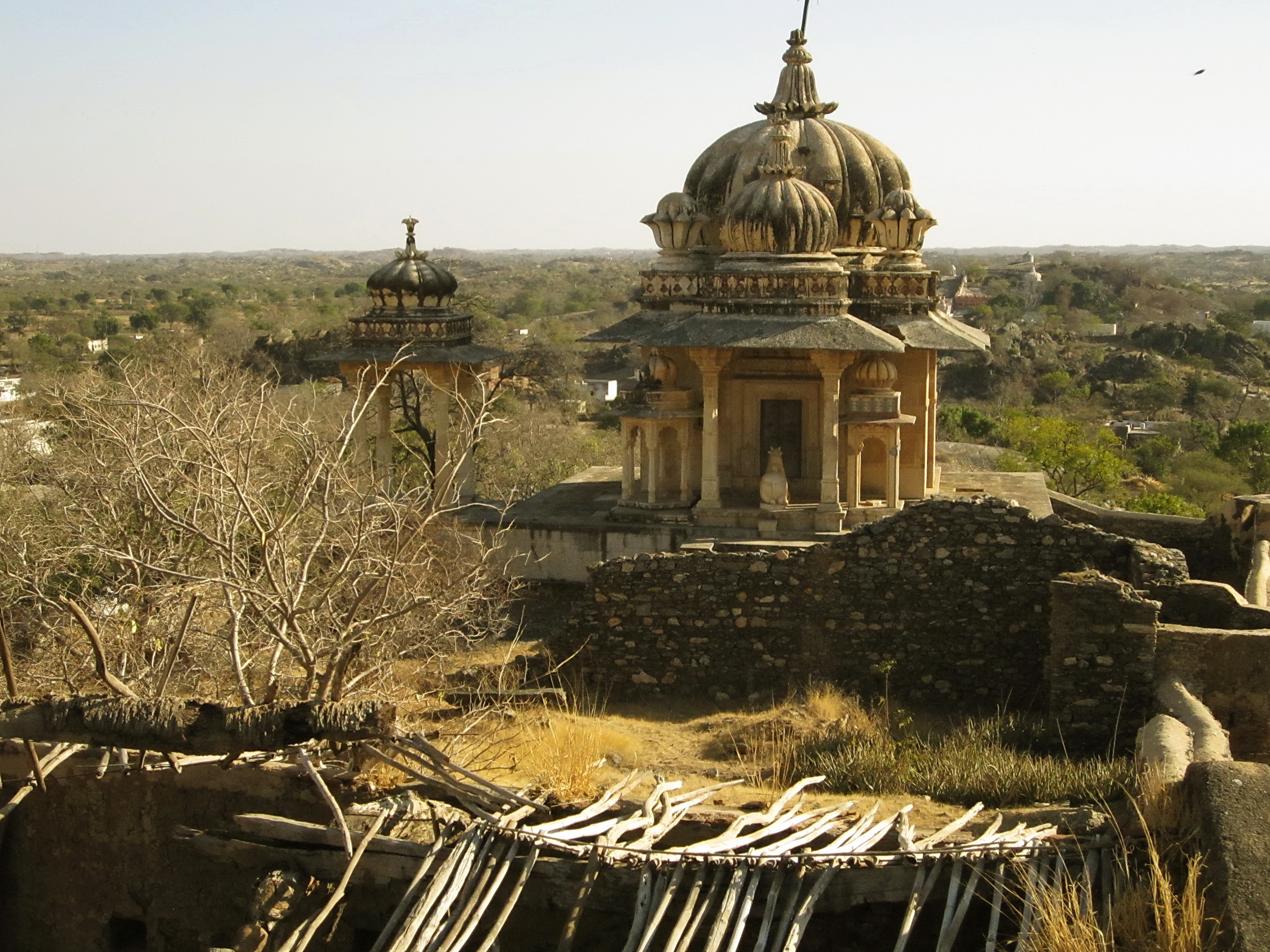
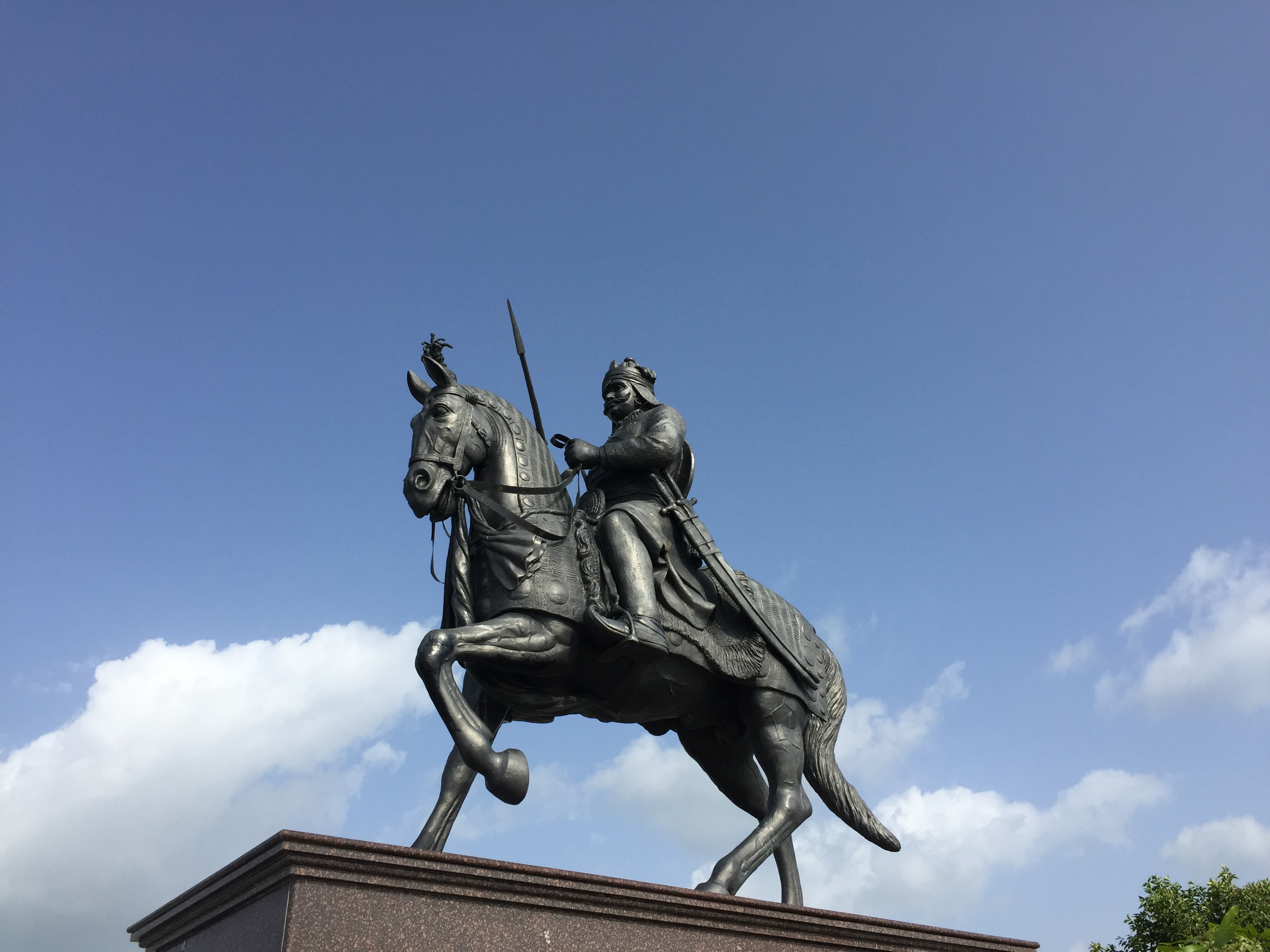
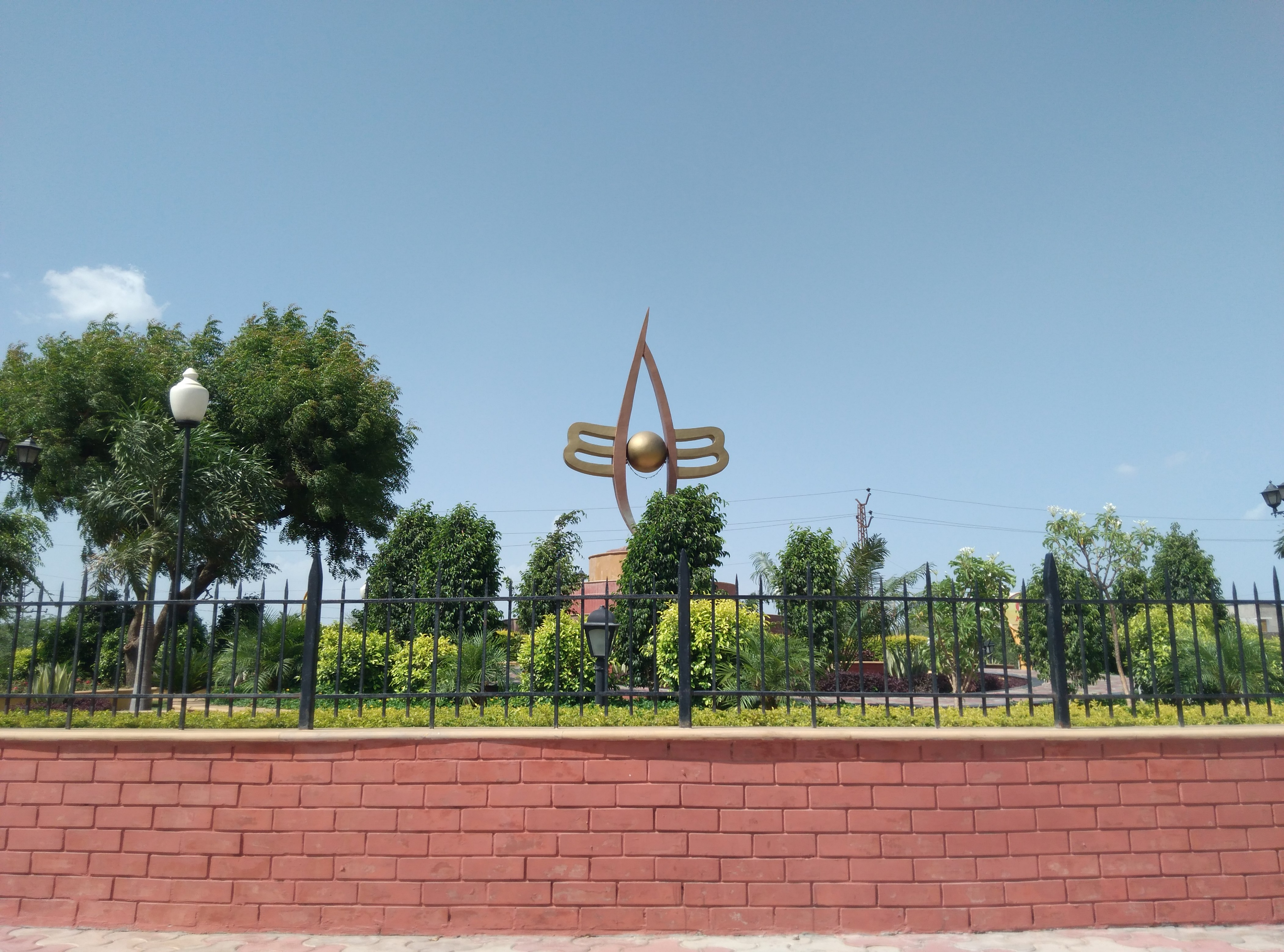
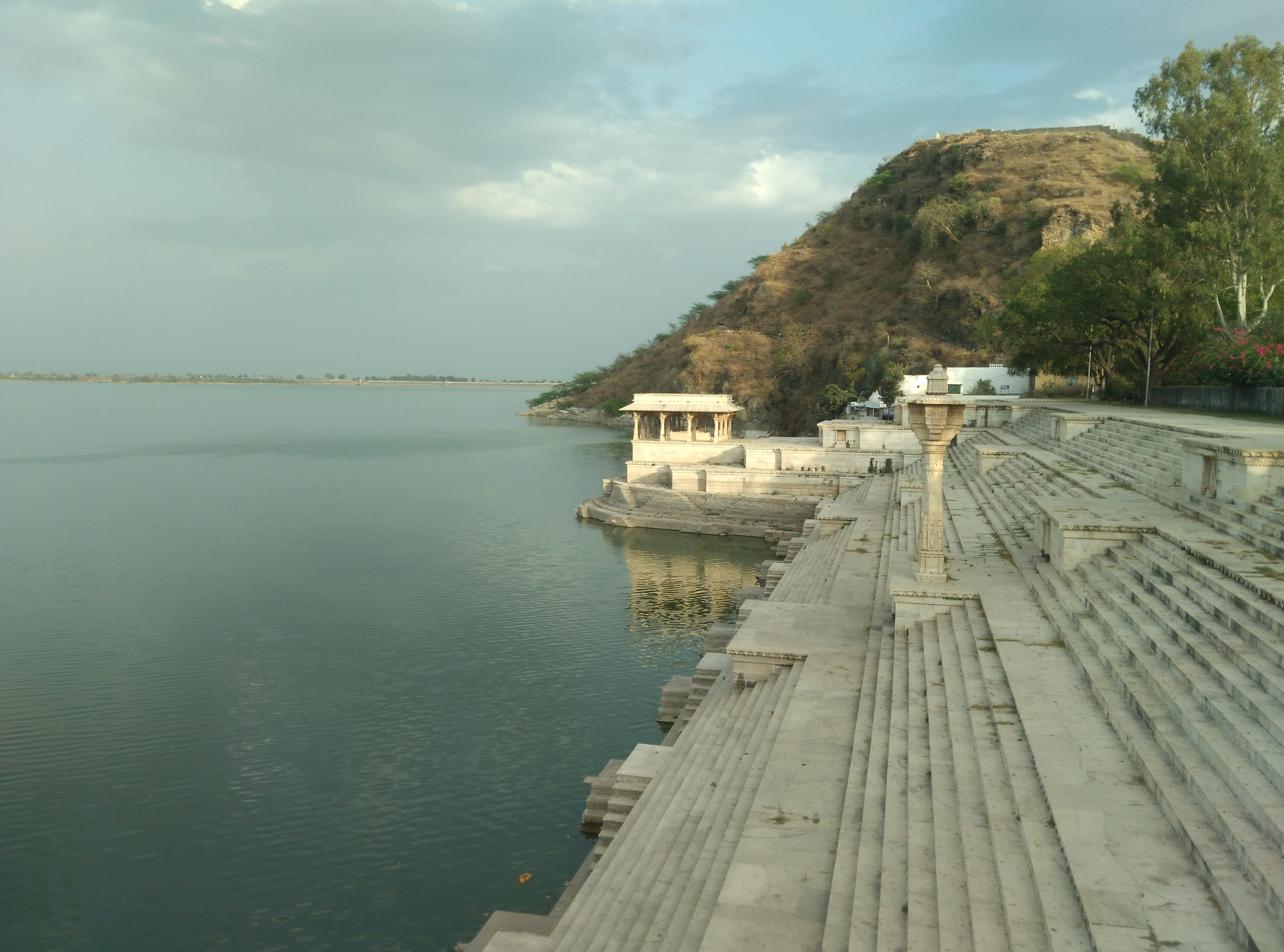
- Clockwise from top-left: Kumbalgarh Fort, Anjana Fort, Third Eye Circle in Nathdwara, Rajsamand Lake, Statue of Maharana Pratap at Haldighati

- Coordinates: 25°04′N 73°52′E
- Country: India
- State: Rajasthan
- Division: Udaipur
- Headquarter: Rajsamand
- Established: 10 April 1991
- Named for: Rajsamand lake

Area
  - Total: 4,550.93 km^{2} (1,757.12 sq mi)
  - Rank: 19

Population (2011)
  - Total: 1,156,597
  - Density: 217/km^{2} (560/sq mi)

Languages
  - Official: Hindi, Rajasthani
  - Regional: Mewari
- Time zone: UTC+5:30 (IST)
- PIN: 313324/26
- Telephone code: 02952
- Vehicle registration: RJ-30
- Lok Sabha constituency: Rajsamand (Lok Sabha constituency)
- Nearest city: Udaipur, Chittorgarh, Bhilwara, Ajmer
- Avg. annual temperature: 22.5 °C (72.5 °F)
- Avg. summer temperature: 45 °C (113 °F)
- Avg. winter temperature: 00 °C (32 °F)
- Website: rajsamand.rajasthan.gov.in

Rajsamand district is a district of the state of Rajasthan in western India. The city of Rajsamand is the district headquarters. The district was constituted on 10 April 1991 from Udaipur district by carving out 7 tehsils - Bhim, Deogarh, Amet, Kumbhalgarh, Rajsamand, Nathdwara, and Railmagra.

== Geography ==
The district has an area of 4,768 km^{2}. The Aravalli Range forms the northwestern boundary of the district, across which lies Pali District. Beawar District lies to the north, Bhilwara District to the northeast and east, Chittorgarh District to the southeast, and Udaipur District to the south. The district lies in the watershed of the Banas River and its tributaries. Some other rivers are: Ari, Gomati, Chandrabhaga

== Demographics ==
Historical population
Year	Pop.	±% p.a.
1901	187,692	—
1911	232,110	+2.15%
1921	246,483	+0.60%
1931	282,066	+1.36%
1941	336,384	+1.78%
1951	395,465	+1.63%
1961	470,115	+1.74%
1971	553,189	+1.64%
1981	693,358	+2.28%
1991	819,014	+1.68%
2001	982,523	+1.84%
2011	1,156,597	+1.64%

Religions in Rajsamand district (2011)
Religion	Percent
Hinduism	95.60%
Islam	2.91%
Jainism	1.29%
Other or not stated	0.20%

According to the 2011 census Rajsamand district has a population of 1,156,597, roughly equal to the nation of Timor-Leste or the US state of Rhode Island. This gives it a ranking of 405th in India (out of a total of 640). The district has a population density of 302 inhabitants per square kilometre (780/sq mi) . Its population growth rate over the decade 2001-2011 was 17.35%. Rajsamand has a sex ratio of 988 females for every 1000 males, and a literacy rate of 63.93%. 15.89% of the population lives in urban areas. Scheduled Castes and Scheduled Tribes make up 12.81% and 13.90% of the population respectively.

Languages of Rajsamand district (2011)
1. Mewari (75.4%)
2. Rajasthani (17.2%)
3. Hindi (4.30%)
4. Marwari (0.97%)
5. Bhili (2.18%)

At the time of the 2011 Census of India, 75.36% of the population in the district spoke Mewari, 17.19% Rajasthani, 4.30% Hindi and 0.97% Marwari as their first language.

== Places to interest ==
Rajsamand district had lot of natural and historical places to visit.

- Kumbhalgarh
- Rajsamand Lake
- Charbhuja Temple, Garhbor
- Shrinathji Temple, Nathdwara
- Kumbhalgarh Wildlife Sanctuary
- Haldighati
- Dwarkadheesh Temple
- Deogarh
- Victory memorial at Dewair
- Todgarh Raoli Sanctuary
- Ghoram Ghat, Kachabali

== See also ==
- Bhim Assembly constituency
