= Todgarh =

Town in Rajasthan, India

Tatgarh Todgarh
- Town
- Todgarh
- Location in Rajasthan, India Tatgarh (India)
- Coordinates: 25.6906°N 73.9717°E
- Country: India
- State: Rajasthan
- District: Beawar
- Founder: Bhim Singh
- Named for: James Tod
- Elevation: 510 m (1,670 ft)

Population (2011)
  - Total: 21,626

Languages
  - Official: Hindi
- Time zone: UTC+5:30 (IST)

Todgarh or Tatgarh is a town located in Beawar district in Rajasthan, India. It is situated 13 km away from the district headquarters Beawar and 130 km away from Ajmer. Tatgarh town is also a tehsil headquarters. It served as a tehsil of Ajmer Merwada during British rule in India.

== Geography ==
The total geographical area of the town is 571 hectares.

== Demographics ==
Tatgarh has a total population of 2,272 people, out of which the male population is 1,141 while the female population is 1,131. The literacy rate of tatgarh town is 66.90% out of which 80.11% males and 53.58% females are literate. There are about 475 houses in tatgarh village. Pincode of tatgarh town locality is 305924.

== Location ==
It is located in a small patch of land belonging to Ajmer district but embedded between Pali and Rajsamand districts. Beawar is the nearest town to tatgarh for all major economic activities, which is approximately 13 km away.

== History ==
=== British influence and naming ===
In 1821, Colonel James Tod, a British officer and Oriental scholar, was appointed as the Political Agent in Udaipur under the East India Company. He played a significant role in documenting the history and geography of Rajputana (present-day Rajasthan) and authored the seminal work *Annals and Antiquities of Rajasthan*. During his tenure, Maharana Bhim Singh of Mewar honoured him by naming a village "Todgarh," combining Tod's name with "garh," meaning fort. This area was previously known as Madla.

=== Missionary activities and church construction ===
In the mid-19th century, William Robb, a missionary of the Scottish United Presbyterian Church, was drawn to Todgarh's natural beauty. Between 1850 and 1860, he constructed a church on one of the hillocks, along with a post office and a jail. This church is recognized as one of the earliest in Rajasthan and still stands today, albeit in a dilapidated condition.

=== World War I contributions ===
During World War I, approximately 2,600 soldiers from the Todgarh region enlisted to fight. Of these, 124 were martyred. In their memory, a building known as the Victory Memorial Dharamshala was constructed by the British government, funded in part by the pensions of veterans. This structure serves as a tribute to their sacrifice.

=== Cultural and historical significance ===
Todgarh is situated between the regions of Mewar and Marwar, areas rich in Rajput history and culture. The region has been associated with notable figures such as Baba Meshnath and Bhaunath, and revolutionary freedom fighter Rawat Raju Singh Chauhan. The area's historical significance is further underscored by its connections to the artistic and devotional traditions of Mewar, including the legacies of Rana Kumbha and Meera Bai.

== Climate ==
Due to being a hilly area, the weather here remains cool; the heat is less during the summer days. The average winter temperature here ranges from 16 to 18 degree C and in summer the average temperature ranges from 35 to 40 degree C. The average annual rainfall here is 500 mm. Here the winter season is from October to January, the summer season from February to May and the rainy season from June to September; sometimes it rains from the winter monsoon which is called Maavat.

== Wildlife ==
Todgarh is part of the Todgarh-Raoli Wildlife Sanctuary, which spans the districts of Ajmer, Pali, and Rajsamand. The sanctuary harbours dry deciduous forests, rocky hills, and grasslands, home to a variety of flora and fauna. Notable species include leopards, sloth bears, chinkara, nilgai, and several bird species.

== Places of interest ==
Isar Baori
The central point of Todgarh is the Isar Baori, a stepwell which once served as the water source for the cantonment. Adjacent to it are colonial-era buildings including a rest house and an old church. Though abandoned, these structures reflect the military and administrative presence established by the British in the early 19th century.

Pragya Shikhar (Mahashila Abhilekh)
Pragya Shikhar, also known as Mahashila Abhilekh, is a commemorative black-granite monument in Todgarh dedicated to Acharya Tulsi, the ninth Acharya of the Śvetāmbara Terapanth Jain tradition. It was built by Sahitya Sansthan and inaugurated by former President of India A. P. J. Abdul Kalam. The site includes an old bungalow whose corridors have been converted into a small museum displaying historical household objects, military memorabilia and other artefacts. A room dedicated to Colonel James Tod displays his diaries and photographs.

Dudhaleshwar Mahadev Temple
Located in the midst of the Todgarh forest, the Dudhaleshwar Mahadev Temple is an ancient Shiva shrine known for its serene surroundings. Legend has it that a sage once resided here, and milk flowed from the shivlinga during his prayers—hence the name "Dudhaleshwar." A perennial spring still flows near the temple, and the site is now managed by a local trust.

Kajalwas Dhuni
This spiritual site, deep within the Todgarh forests, is associated with a revered siddha purusha who is believed to have meditated here and attained enlightenment. Known as Kajal Baba, he was said to appear covered in black ash (kajal). The site includes a sacred fireplace (dhuni) that is still worshipped by devotees. A small ashram and temple have been built here.

Bheelberi Falls and Vulture Habitat
Located within the sanctuary, Bheelberi is a seasonal waterfall that comes alive during the monsoon. The cliffs here serve as nesting grounds for several species of vultures, including the critically endangered long-billed vulture. A jeep track leads to the top of the hill, offering panoramic views of the forested valley.

Dewair
About 14 kilometres from Todgarh lies Dewair, a historically significant site where Maharana Pratap is said to have defeated the Mughals around 1582 CE. The site is marked by a monument commemorating the battle, considered a turning point in Mewar's resistance against Mughal expansion. Dewair is often referred to as the "Second Haldighati" due to the scale and significance of the conflict.
