= Deogarh, Rajasthan =

Deogarh
- Town
- Deogarh Madaria
- Location in Rajasthan, India Deogarh (India)
- Coordinates: 25.53°N 73.9°E
- Country: India
- State: Rajasthan
- District: Rajsamand

Government
  - Body: Municipality
  - Nagarpalika Chairman: Shobha Lal Regar
- Elevation: 638 m (2,093 ft)

Population (2011)
  - Total: 17,604

Languages
  - Official: Hindi, Rajasthani

Language
  - Regional: Marwadi
- Time zone: UTC+5:30 (IST)
- ISO 3166 code: RJ-IN
- Vehicle registration: RJ-
- Nearest city: Udaipur, Rajsamand, Ajmer, Bhilwara, Beawar, Pali

Deogarh, also known as Devgarh, is a town and a municipality, nearby Rajsamand city in Rajsamand District in the Indian state of Rajasthan. Formerly the town was an estate of the Chundawat Rajputs.

== Geography ==
Deogarh is located at 25.53°N 73.9°E. It has an average elevation of 638 m (2,093 ft), and is situated on the eastern side of the Aravali Ranges on top of a small hill. A small pond rests at its base. The town is bordered by rocks in the east, Kali Ghati (Aravali Range) in the west, Nathdwara Ghats in the south and Ajmer in the north. It has spectacular animal and bird sanctuaries. There are many stone and granite mines and polish factories near the city.

== Demographics ==
As of the 2011 India census, Deogarh had a population of 17,604 - 8,899 Males and 8,705 females. Deogarh has an average literacy rate of 76.83%, higher than the state average of 66.11%: male literacy is 89.08% and female literacy is 64.38%.

== Transport ==
The town is located 4 km inside the NH-8 (Mumbai-Delhi Highway), the landmark is Kamlighat. As no broad gauge train is available, roads are often the quickest way of reaching the town. Nearby cities are Udaipur (140 km), Ajmer and Bhilwara. Udaipur also has an airport with regular flights from Delhi and Mumbai.

A train can be taken anywhere between Mavli Junction to Marwar Junction. The route between Marwar Junction and Deogarh is scenic.

== Places of interest ==
Deogarh is a popular tourist destination, boasting a complex of luxurious heritage resorts managed by the erstwhile royal family of the Deogarh thikana.

Apart from the palace there is also a meter gauge train from Deogarh to Marwar Junction which goes through the sanctuary and hills of Kali Ghati, where there are many bridges and tunnels constructed by the British. There are many wild animals in the region, and the plains of Marwar are visible from atop the mountains.

In the heart of the town, is the Kunjbihari Mandir, which is famous for the many bats that live inside the roof of the building. There is one clock tower in the main central chowk (market) of the town at the top of Charbhuja Temple.

Anjaneshwar Mahadev temple is also nearby (around 4–5 km), which is famous for its Sivalinga which formed naturally as a result of rain water dissolving calcium in the rocks. It was formed similarly to the ice sivalinga of Amarnath Temple. The temple is in a mountain cave with a small water body on top of it. The area is a common destination for picnics, and has a view of Deogarh because of its elevation. Situated on the Deogarh–Bhilwara route, it is easily accessible throughout the year.

Other places like Nathdwara, famous for the Shrinath Ji Temple, is just 90 km from Deogarh on the road to Udaipur. Ajmer is also just 150 km away on Jaipur–Delhi Route.

== Notable persons ==
- Lakshmi Kumari Chundawat, author, scholar and former member of the Rajya Sabha
