= Dariyavji =

Dariyavji was a Rajasthani Language poet of the medieval era in Rajputana. He was a Sadhak and saint poet and founder of the Rama Sanehi sect of the Ren branch. He is called as Dariya Sahab also.

He was born in about 1676 to Manasaji and Gigabai in Jaitaran of Pali district. He was brought up by his maternal grandfather as his parents died in his childhood. Saint Premdas ji maharaj was his guru. He selected the village Khejda (near Merta City) in Nagaur district for his Sadhana. Later he went to many villages. He died in 1758 in village Ren. The place in the village is made as memorial with marble covering.

His poem collection is called Vani. It has been said that his Vani was in quantity of about 10,000,0, but he himself only blown the collection in the river water. He used normal words in his poems. He emphasised on the Rama sumiran.

== Exiernal links ==
- Dariyavji (in Hindi)
- Ren
