= Charbhuja =

- Location within Rajasthan Location within India

Religion
- Affiliation: Hinduism
- District: Rajsamand
- Deity: Charbhuja Nath (Vishnu)
- Festival: Jal Julni Fagotsav Janmastmi Annakut mahotsav

Location
- Location: Garhbor, Kumbhalgarh
- State: Rajasthan
- Country: India
- Coordinates: 25.2667°N 73.6833°E

Architecture
- Creator: Bharat Pandiya
- Completed: 1444 AD
- Elevation: 849 m (2,785 ft)

Charbhuja is a temple of the Hindu god Krishna in the Garhbor village in the Kumbhalgarh tehsil of Rajsamand district in the state of Rajasthan, India, 112 km from Udaipur and 32 km from Kumbhalgarh.

== About the temple ==
The temple features a high shikhar, with the highest shikhar on the sanctum sanctorum, Charbhuja Nath Ji's shrine. The shikhar features an octagonal spherical tomb-like shape in the centre. Almost all of the other two shrines. On either side of the entrance is a stone elephant.

The idol of Shri Charbhuja Ji is 85 cm high. The four arms of the idol hold conch, discus, mace and a lotus flowers.
