= Rajsamand Lake =

Lake in Rajasthan

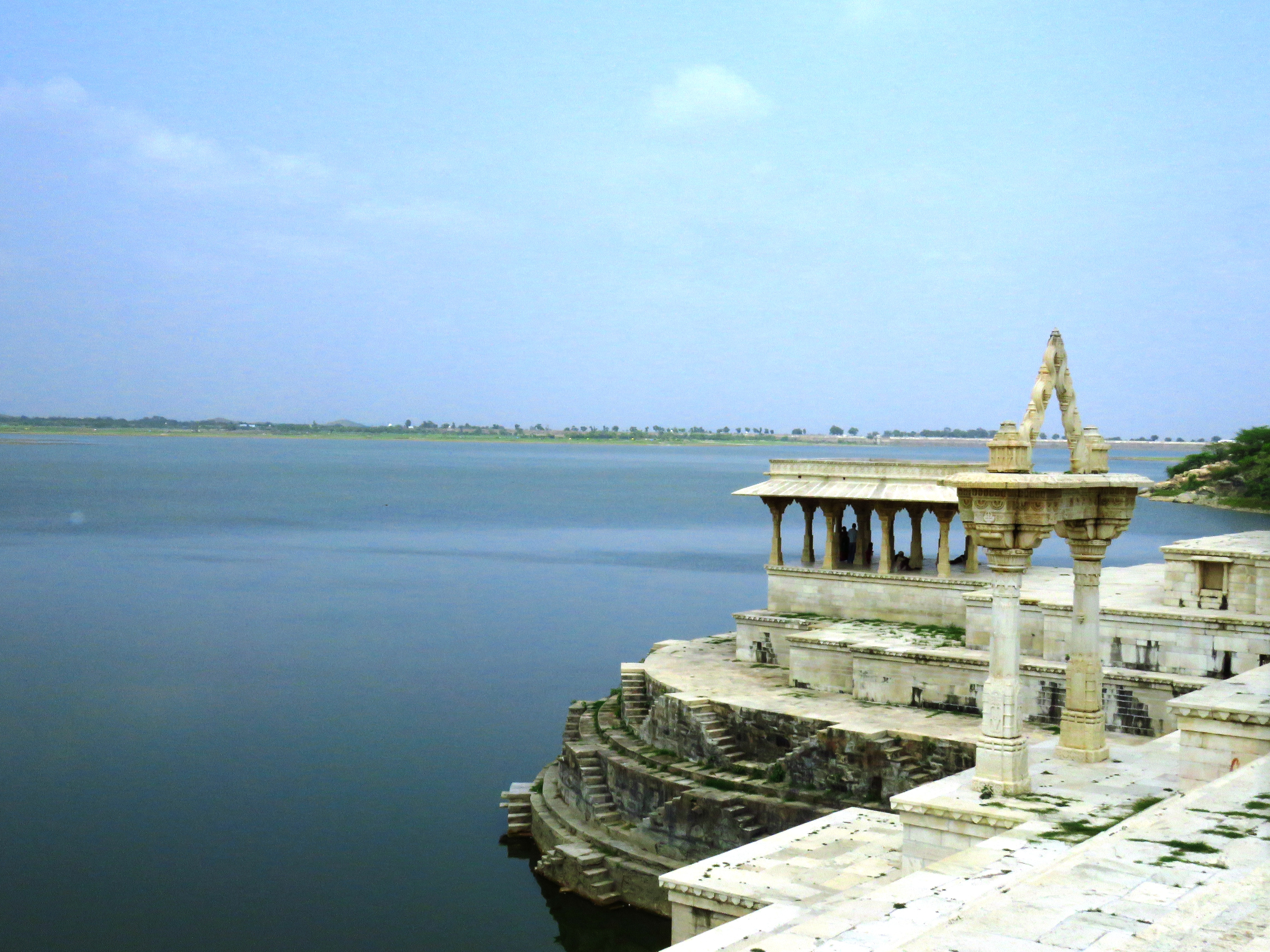
- Ghat of Rajsamand lake, (RJ) with pavilions and toranas

- Location within Rajasthan
- Interactive map of Rajsamand Lake
- Location: Rajsamand city, Rajasthan, India
- Coordinates: 25.07°N 73.88°E
- Lake type: Freshwater lake
- Primary inflows: Gomati, Kelwa and Tali rivers
- Catchment area: 196 sq mi (510 km^{2})
- Basin countries: India
- Built: 20 January 1676; 350 years ago
- Max. length: 6.4 km (4.0 mi)
- Max. width: 2.82 km (1.75 mi)
- Average depth: 18 m (59 ft)
- Settlements: Rajnagar, Kankroli

Rajsamand Lake, also known as Rajsamudra Lake, is a lake in the city of Rajsamand in the Rajsamand district of Indian state of Rajasthan, 67 km away from Udaipur. Built by Rana Raj Singh, it is approximately 1.75 miles (2.82 km) wide, 4 miles (6.4 km) long and 60 feet (18 m) deep. It was built across the Gomti river which originates from Sewantri, Kelwa and Tali rivers, with a catchment area of approximately 196 sq mi (510 km^{2}).

== Inspiration ==
There may be several reasons Raj Singh undertook construction of a lake of such large scale. It is mentioned that while travelling to Jaisalmer, Raj Singh had to stop for 3 days due to large volume of water in the river, so he thought of stopping the river and building a pond around it.

Raj Singh was known to be quick tempered and in his lifetime, he had executed one of his sons, wife, a Brahmin and a Charan.

One of his queens, mother of prince Sardar Singh wanted her son to succeed the throne instead of elder prince Sultan Singh, for which she created suspicion in the mind of Maharana. Thus, Raj Singh executed his son, Sultan Singh. Thereafter, the same queen now conspired to kill Raj Singh in order for her son to ascend the throne, but the Brahmin cook who was supposed to poison Raj Singh was caught and the whole conspiracy was revealed. Thus, the conspiring queen and the Brahmin cook were both executed on the orders of Raj Singh. Sardar Singh, who was unaware of the conspiracy, committed suicide by eating poison.

In another incident, Udaibhan, a Charan who was a tazimi sardar, arrived in the royal court to find that Raj Singh did not rose up to greet him as was the custom. Construing it as a sign of disrespect, Udaibhan loudly derided the Maharana in the court while a meeting with a Mughal noble was going on, finalizing a treaty between the Mughal Empire and Mewar. Raged at the insult, Raj Singh lost his temper and attacked Udaibhan, killing him in the court.

Later, Raj Singh consulted his purohits to find a way to redress these killings and it was suggested that he build a large pond or lake.

== Construction ==
Construction of the lake started in 1662 and completed in 1676, this is the oldest known famine relief work in Rajasthan, which provided relief to starving population. The total cost of the construction is mentioned as 15,078,784 rupees.

Its Muhurat was performed on 1 January 1662, which started with herculean task of drying the river bed. Over 60,000 skilled workers were employed in this task. All kinds of water extraction techniques which were available at that time, were employed. After three years of effort, the foundation was laid on 17 April 1665. The main dam was completed on 26 June 1670. Construction took longer for other dams on different sides of the lake. Ship builders from Lahore, Surat and Gujarat were employed to construct a big boat.

== Consecretion ceremony ==
The consecration ceremony was held in January 1676. Invitations were sent to the rulers, thakurs, cāraṇas, scholars and other religious leaders. Twenty-six Brahmin priests were appointed for the performance of the ceremonies, as laid down in the Matsya Purana. Libations were poured into the sacred fire devoted to the chief deity, Varuna. The Rana prayed to his kuldevi and various other deities.

On 15 Jan, 1676 Maharana Raj Singh started parikrama of the lake, which was completed after 6 days of walk. Charities were also given while performing the parikrama.

=== Tula Dana (Charities) ===
On 20 January 1676, the naming ceremony was held and various charities were donated. The ruler, Rana Raj Singh, had himself weighed against gold and gave away the amount in charity. Five other persons performed charity in this fashion. The chief queen Rani Sadakumari, Purohit Gharib Das, Barhatt Kesari Singh, Rao Kesari Singh of Solambar, and the Rani of Toda had themselves weighed against silver and donated the amount in charity.

A large number of land-grants conferred on the Cāraṇas were confirmed and honoured. Gifts were distributed among the 46,000 Brahmins who were present at the spot.

== Places of interest ==
- Nau Chauki - It is built over dam towards Kankroli. It has three intricately carved marble pavilions, with images of various Hindu gods, dancers, birds and animals. There were five Tula-daan toran of which only three survive now on Nau Chauki, where various charities and Tula-Daan was performed by Maharana Raj Singh, his wife, his son, purohit and others.
- Raj-Prashasti - the lake view point built over the dam has world's longest and largest stone inscription in Sanskrit, called Raj-Prashasti. It is inscribed on 25 black marble slabs, describing history of Mewar. It was written by Ranchor Bhatt.
- Rajsamand Panorama - It is built by Rajasthan government, it has brief history of Rajsamand and reign of Maharana Raj Singh, with statues of Rana Raj Singh and others.
- Adventure and Water sports - Various water sports activities like Jet-ski, speed boat, aqua cycle are now launched at Rajsamand Lake. Parasailing was also launched to give a thrilling aerial view of the lake.

== Seaplane base ==
The lake was used as a seaplane base for Imperial Airways for its route of London to Sydney. During World War II, it was taken over by IAF which used it as auxiliary base.

== See also ==
- Raj Prashasti
- List of lakes in India
