= Nimaj =

- town
- Location in Rajasthan, India Nimaj (India)
- Coordinates: 26°09′00″N 74°00′05″E
- Country: India
- State: Rajasthan
- District: Beawar
- Named for: Nimbaj
- Talukas: Jaitaran

Government
  - Body: Gram Panchayat
- Elevation: 315 m (1,033 ft)

Population (2001)
  - Total: 5,309

Languages
  - Official: Marwari, Hindi
- Time zone: UTC+5:30 (IST)
- ISO 3166 code: RJ-IN
- Vehicle registration: RJ-22
- Sex ratio: 966 ♂/♀
- Lok Sabha constituency: Pali (Lok Sabha constituency)
- Vidhan Sabha constituency: Pali
- Civic agency: Gram Panchayat
- Avg. annual temperature: 30 °C (86 °F)
- Avg. summer temperature: 44 °C (111 °F)
- Avg. winter temperature: 05 °C (41 °F)

Nimaj is a census town in the Jaitaran tehsil of the Beawar District of Rajasthan, India. It was a statutory town from 1901 to 1951.

== Demographics ==
The population of Nimaj is 5309 according to the 2001 census. The male population is 2703, while the female population is 2606.
