= Jaitaran =

- Town
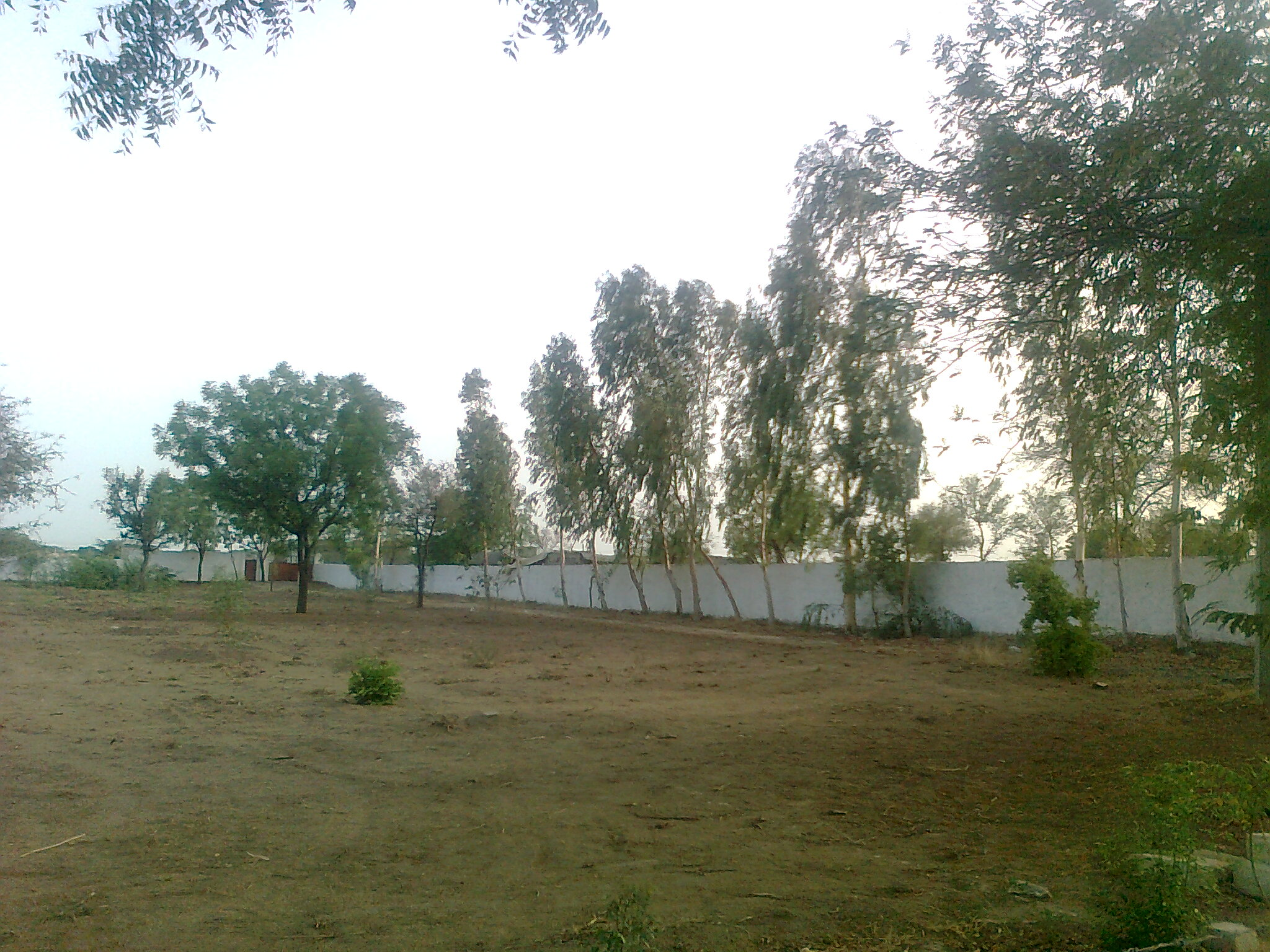
- Jaitaran town in Rajasthan, India

- Location in Rajasthan, India Jaitaran (India)
- Coordinates: 26.2°N 73.94°E
- Country: India
- State: Rajasthan
- District: Beawar

Government
  - Type: Local Self Government
  - Body: Municipal Corporation
- Elevation: 307 m (1,007 ft)

Population (2011)
  - Total: 22,639

Languages
  - Official: Marwari
- Time zone: UTC+5:30 (IST)
- PIN: 306302
- Telephone code: 02939
- Vehicle registration: RJ-22
- Sex ratio: 958 ♂/♀

Jaitaran is a town and a municipality in Beawar district in the Indian state of Rajasthan.

== History ==
Jaitaran was one of the districts under Jodhpur State. Rao Suja's son, Rao Uda, did not receive Jaitaran as a grant; he conquered it from the Sindal Rajputs with his friend Khetsinh Kaviya of Birai. Khetsinh Kaviya's successors were later granted the jageer of Gehwasni (later divided into two villages Nokh and Basni Kaviyan) situated near Jaitaran for his bravery. Uda's descendants are known as Udawats and till 1947, Udawats held major thikanas around Jaitaran, like Raipur, Nimaj, Ras, Lambia. During Maratha raids in Marwar, Holkar found it very difficult to extort money from people around Jaitaran, Sojat and Raipur as they preferred to quit their huts, set fire to them rather than being forced to make any kind of payment.

== Geography ==
Jaitaran is located at 26.2°N 73.94°E. It has an average elevation of 307metres (1007feet).

== Demographics ==
As of 2011 India census, Jaitaran had a population of 22,639. Males constitute 51% (11,564) of the population and females 49% (11,074). Jaitaran has an average literacy rate of 65.15%, lower than the national average of 74.04%: male literacy is 75.2%, and female literacy is 54.7%. In Jaitaran, 14% of the population is under 6 years of age.

== Notable people ==
- Dariyavji (1676–1758), Rajasthani poet
