= Beawar =

- city
- Beawar
- Location in Rajasthan, India Beawar (India)
- Coordinates: 26.1°N 74.32°E
- Country: India
- State: Rajasthan
- District: Beawar
- Founded: 1 Feb. 1836
- Founder: Charles George Dixon

Government
  - Type: Municipal Council
  - Municipality Chairman: Naresh kanojiya

Area
  - city: 55 km^{2} (21 sq mi)
- Elevation: 439 m (1,440 ft)

Population (2011)
  - city: 151,152
  - Density: 8,544/km^{2} (22,130/sq mi)
  - Urban: 151,152 (44.1%)
  - Rural: 191,783 (55.9%)
  - Literacy: 64.2%
  - Sex ratio: 970 female per 1,000 male

Languages
  - Spoken: Hindi, Marwadi
  - Official: Hindi, English
- Time zone: UTC+5:30 (IST)
- PIN: 305901
- Area code: 01462
- Vehicle registration: RJ-36
- Website: www.beawar.com

Beawar (pronounced [bəˈjaːʋər]) is a city in Beawar District of Rajasthan, India. Beawar was the financial capital of Ajmer-Merwara state of Rajputana. As of 2011, the population of Beawar city is 151152 (1 lakh fifty one thousand one hundred fifty two). It is located 70 kilometres (43 mi) from Ajmer and 184 kilometres (114 mi) southwest of the state capital Jaipur, amidst the Aravali hills. The city used to be a major center for trade, especially in raw cotton, and used to have cotton presses and the Krishna cotton mills. Currently, major industries include mineral-based units, machine-based units, machine tools and accessories, pre-stressed concrete pipes, plastic products, textiles, wooden furniture and asbestos cement pipes. Beawar is the largest producer of cement in northern India and home to Shree Cement.Beawar is located central region of Rajasthan.

It is situated in a mineral-rich region having reserves of feldspar, quartz, asbestos, soapstone, magnesite, calcite, limestone, mica, emerald, granite, and masonry stone. Reserves of barytes, fluorite, wollastonite and vermiculite have also been found. Beawar is a newly established district in Rajasthan, India, officially formed on August 7, 2023.

== History ==
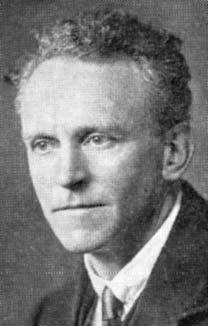
Duncan Sommerville

In the early 19th century, Beawar was a village. By 1825, the British acquired control of the Ajmer-Merwara region, and established a cantonment around 4 miles from the existing village. In 1836, they attracted merchants and constructed a bazaar (market), which became the core of a site called "Naya Shahar" or "Naya Nagar" ("New Town"). Colonel George Dickson (1795–1857) established this new town on the waste land adjacent to the cantonment and the original Beawar village. The area eventually evolved into the present-day town of Beawar.

The population of the town rose substantially over the next decade, as it became the centre of cotton trade. In 1871, the battalion was moved from the local cantonment to Ajmer, but the town continued remained an important trading centre.

A municipality was established at Beawar in 1866. In 1880, railway reached the town, and in 1881, Krishna Cotton Mill was established there. By 1901, the town had a population of 21,928, with 48.6 of the work force employed in the manufacturing sector (38% in cotton textiles industry). Metalwork, calico printing, and grain trade were the other important industries of the town.

Beawar is the birthplace of classical mathematician Duncan Sommerville.

== Culture ==
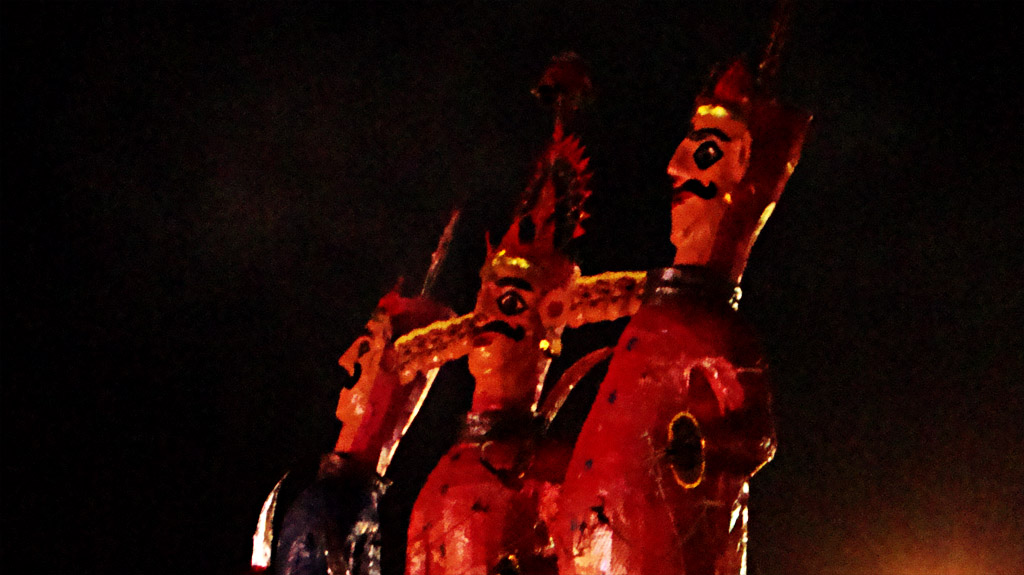
Effigy used for Ravan dahan in 2012

Veer Tejaji maharaj Beawar Fair is one of the major fairs of the town. Locals of Beawar gather to celebrate Baadshah, which means "King". The Baadshah travels across the town to reach the Mayor's office, spraying colour all over the town in celebration of Holi, the festival of colours. It is celebrated in memory of the one-day king "Agarwal".

"Baadshah" is decorated in traditional style and travels up to the magistrate office, where it plays and gives its resolutions for the public. In front of it, another person, Birbal, dances in his special style. On the day of "Baadshah", there are performances by local people in "Teliwara" as well as near the Suraj Pol gate.

Annually, the city also celebrates Dushera by burning an effigy of Ravana on the eve of Dushera.

== Demographic ==
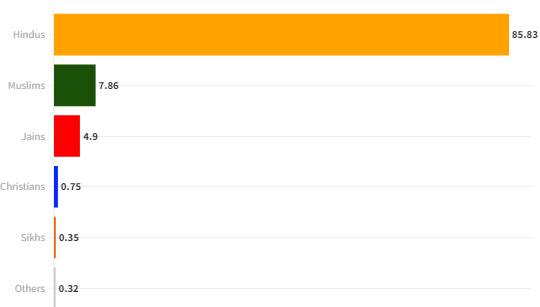
Religions in Beawar City (2011 census)

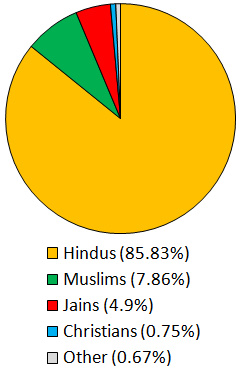
Religions in Beawar City (Based on 2011 Census)

As of the 2011 India census, Beawar had a population of 342,935. Males constitute 51% of the population and females 49%. Beawar has an average literacy rate of 64%, higher than the national average of 59.5%, with 60% of the males and 40% of females literate. Around 15% of the population was under 6 years of age.

== Geography and climate ==
Beawar is located at 26.1°N 74.32°E. It has an average elevation of 439 metres (1,440 ft).

Map of Beawar's old urban area

Climate data for Beawar
Month	Jan	Feb	Mar	Apr	May	Jun	Jul	Aug	Sep	Oct	Nov	Dec	Year
Mean daily maximum °C (°F)	25 (77)	28 (82)	34 (93)	38 (100)	41 (106)	40 (104)	36 (97)	34 (93)	36 (97)	36 (97)	31 (88)	27 (81)	34 (93)
Mean daily minimum °C (°F)	8 (46)	12 (54)	18 (64)	23 (73)	27 (81)	29 (84)	27 (81)	26 (79)	25 (77)	20 (68)	15 (59)	9 (48)	20 (68)
Average precipitation cm (inches)	0.35 (0.14)	0.27 (0.11)	0.32 (0.13)	0.35 (0.14)	0.6 (0.2)	3.26 (1.28)	8.89 (3.50)	6.44 (2.54)	3.42 (1.35)	0.45 (0.18)	0.07 (0.03)	0.06 (0.02)	24.48 (9.62)
Source: Foreca
