= List of districts of Rajasthan =

Districts of Rajasthan
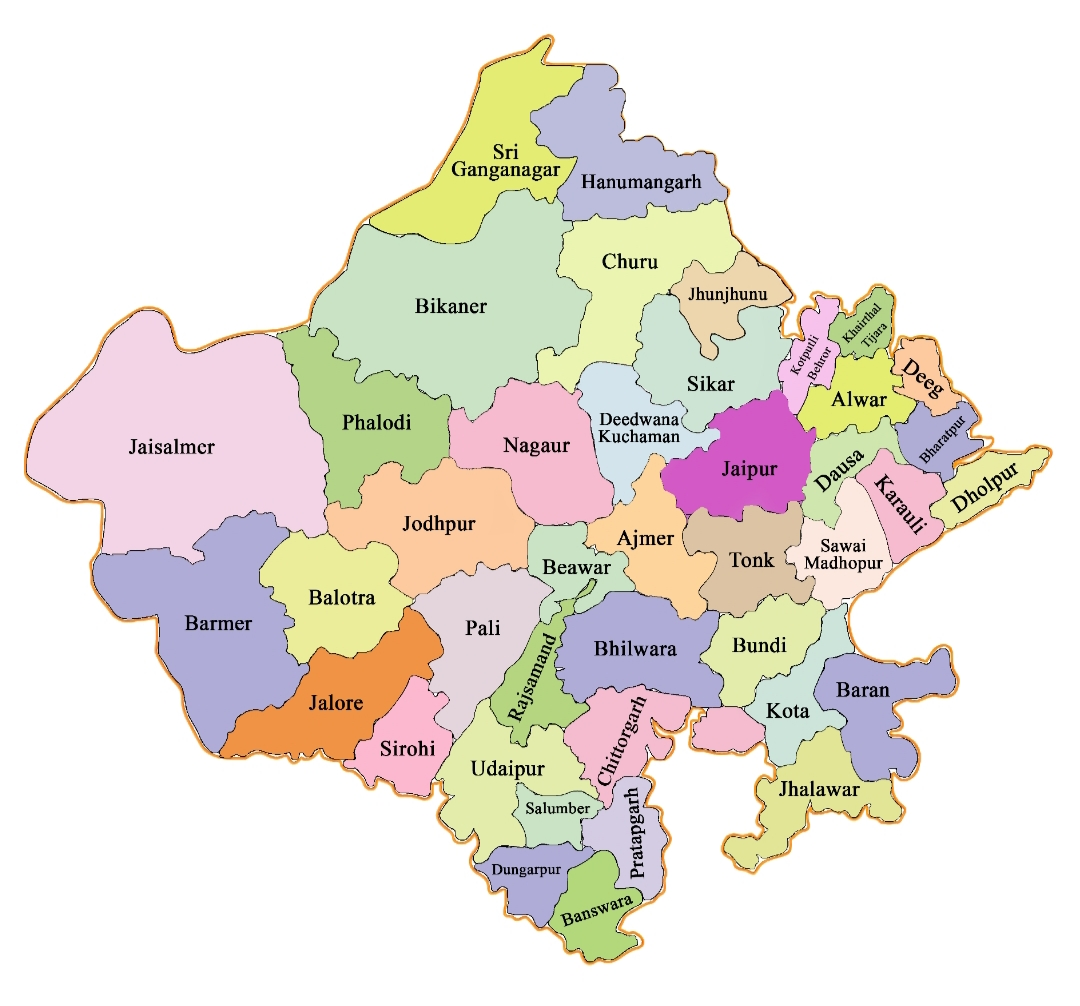
- Districts of Rajasthan in 2025
- Category: Districts
- Location: Rajasthan
- Created: 30 March 1949
- Number: 41 (as of 30 December 2024)
- Populations: Jaisalmer – 669,919 (lowest); Jaipur – 6,626,178 (highest)
- Areas: Dholpur– 3,084 km^{2} (1,191 sq mi) (smallest); Jaisalmer– 38,401 km^{2} (14,827 sq mi) (largest)
- Government: Government of Rajasthan
- Subdivisions: Tehsil (Sub district)

The Indian state of Rajasthan is located in the northwestern part of the country. For the administrative purposes the state is divided into 41 districts and 7 divisions. After the state of Uttar Pradesh with 75 districts and Madhya Pradesh with 57 districts, Rajasthan ranks third in India by number of districts. Rajasthan covers 342,239 square kilometers (132,139 square miles) making it the largest state in India by area.

The responsibilities of district management in the state are carried out by All-India officials and state-appointed officials. The All-India officials in each district are a Deputy Commissioner or district Magistrate (from the Indian Administrative Service), a Superintendent of Police (from the Indian Police Service) and a Deputy Conservator of Forests (from the Indian Forest Service), each of which is assisted by officers of various Rajasthan state services. The state-appointed officials are responsible for matters such as health, education, and other primary facilities.

== List ==
Districts of Rajasthan (Overpass-turbo)

S.No.	District	District's Website	Area (km^{2})	Population	Division
01	Ajmer	Ajmer	8,481	1,531,974	Ajmer
02	Alwar	Alwar	8,380	2,015,275	Jaipur
03	Balotra	Balotra	10,551	1,115,751	Jodhpur
04	Banswara	Banswara	5,037	1,798,194	Udaipur
05	Baran	Baran	6,992	1,223,921	Kota
06	Barmer	Barmer	28,387	1,488,000	Jodhpur
07	Beawar	Beawar	8,481	1,094,918	Ajmer
08	Bharatpur	Bharatpur	5,066	1,475,707	Bharatpur
09	Bhilwara	Bhilwara	10,455	1,589,543	Ajmer
10	Bikaner	Bikaner	30,247	2,367,745	Bikaner
11	Bundi	Bundi	5,550	1,113,725	Kota
12	Chittorgarh	Chittorgarh	7,822	1,544,392	Udaipur
13	Churu	Churu	13,858	2,041,172	Bikaner
14	Dausa	Dausa	3,432	1,637,226	Jaipur
15	Deeg	Deeg	2,169	10,72,755	Bharatpur
16	Didwana-Kuchaman	Didwana-Kuchaman	6,796	1,625,837	Ajmer
17	Dholpur	Dholpur	3,084	1,207,293	Bharatpur
18	Dungarpur	Dungarpur	3,770	1,388,906	Udaipur
19	Hanumangarh	Hanumangarh	9,656	1,774,692	Bikaner
20	Jaipur	Jaipur	11,152	6,046,835	Jaipur
21	Jaisalmer	Jaisalmer	38,401	669,919	Jodhpur
22	Jalore	Jalore	10,640	1,828,730	Jodhpur
23	Jhalawar	Jhalawar	6,928	1,411,129	Kota
24	Jhunjhunu	Jhunjhunu	5,928	2,137,045	Jaipur
25	Jodhpur	Jodhpur	22,850	2,955,582	Jodhpur
26	Karauli	Karauli	5,043	1,458,248	Bharatpur
27	Khairthal-Tijara	Khairthal-Tijara	2,007	966,821	Jaipur
28	Kota	Kota	5,217	1,951,014	Kota
29	Kotputli-Behror	Kotputli-Behror	2,920	1,271,426	Jaipur
30	Nagaur	Nagaur	17,718	1,605,543	Ajmer
31	Pali	Pali	12,387	1,605,543	Jodhpur
32	Phalodi	Phalodi	9,408	731,583	Jodhpur
33	Pratapgarh	Pratapgarh	4,117	867,848	Udaipur
34	Rajsamand	Rajsamand	4,550	1,156,597	Udaipur
35	Salumbar	Salumbar	2,480	570,775	Udaipur
36	Sawai Madhopur	Sawai Madhopur	10,527	1,335,551	Bharatpur
37	Sikar	Sikar	7,742	2,677,333	Jaipur
38	Sirohi	Sirohi	5,136	1,036,346	Jodhpur
39	Sri Ganganagar	Sri Ganganagar	11,154	1,969,168	Bikaner
40	Tonk	Tonk	7,194	1,421,326	Ajmer
41	Udaipur	Udaipur	11,724	2,497,645	Udaipur

== Division ==
The 41 districts have been divided into 7 divisions: Ajmer, Bharatpur, Bikaner, Jaipur, Jodhpur, Kota and Udaipur divisions. Each division consists of some districts (mainly 4-8 districts)

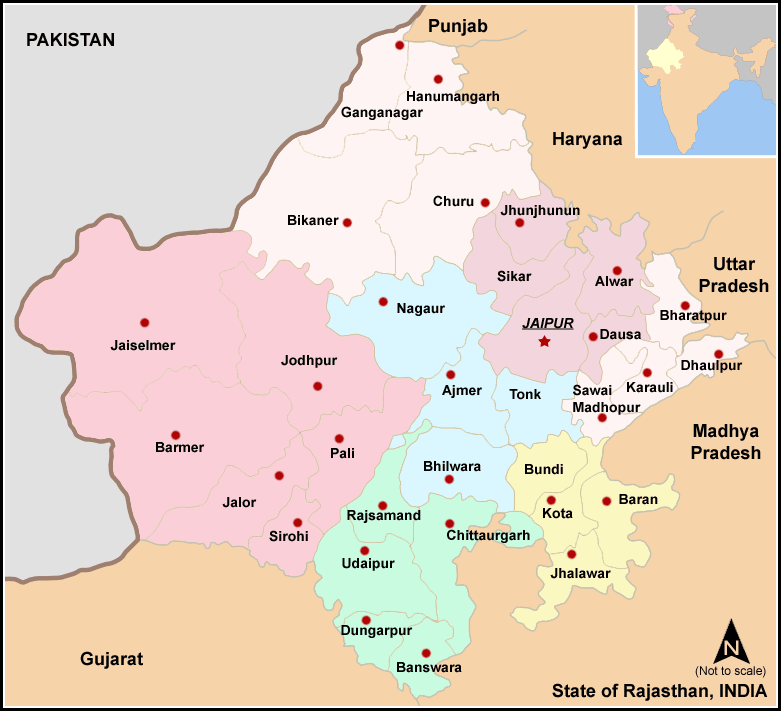
Divisions of Rajasthan

Ajmer Division	Bharatpur division	Bikaner division	Jaipur division	Jodhpur division	Kota division	Udaipur division
1. Ajmer; 2. Beawar; 3. Bhilwara; 4. Didwana-Kuchaman; 5. Nagaur; 6. Tonk	1. Bharatpur; 2. Deeg; 3. Dholpur; 4. Karauli; 5. Sawai Madhopur	1. Bikaner; 2. Churu; 3. Hanumangarh; 4. Sri Ganganagar	1. Alwar; 2. Dausa; 3. Jaipur; 4. Jhunjhunu; 5. Khairthal-Tijara; 6. Kotputli-Behror; 7. Sikar	1. Balotra; 2. Barmer; 3. Jaisalmer; 4. Jalore; 5. Jodhpur; 6. Pali; 7. Phalodi; 8. Sirohi	1. Baran; 2. Bundi; 3. Jhalawar; 4. Kota	1. Banswara; 2. Chittorgarh; 3. Dungarpur; 4. Pratapgarh; 5. Rajsamand; 6. Salumbar; 7. Udaipur

== Proposed districts ==
There are demands for more than 50 districts. The most notable new district-forming demands are given below.

Legends: 9 districts highlighted in bold were notified in 2025 as "nine newly created districts have been dissolved", and 3 districts highlighted in bold italics were earlier notified as revoked.

Current district	Demanded district
Jodhpur	**Jodhpur Rural**
Jalore	Bhinmal
Jalore	**Sanchore**
Khairthal-Tijara	Bhiwari
Khairthal-Tijara	Khairthal
Kotpulti-Behror	Behror
Kotpulti-Behror	Neemrana
Kotpulti-Behror	Kotputli
Didwana-Kuchaman	Makrana
Didwana-Kuchaman	**Kuchaman City**
Didwana-Kuchaman	Sujla
Nagaur	Merta City
Jaipur	Shahpura
Jaipur	Phulera
Jaipur	**Dudu**
Jaipur	**Jaipur Rural**
Jaipur	Sambhar Lake
Sikar	Fatehpur Shekhawati
Sikar	**Neem ka thana**
Sikar	Shrimadhopur
Jaisalmer	Pokhran
Ajmer	**Kekri**
Ajmer	Madanganj-Kishangarh
Churu	Ratangarh
Churu	**Sujangarh**
Shriganganagar	**Anupgarh**
Shriganganagar	Gharsana
Shriganganagar	Shri Vijaynagar
Hanumangarh	Nohar
Hanumangarh	Bhadra
Bikaner	Nokha
Kota	None district is demanded
Baran	Chhabra
Jhalawar	Bhawani Mandi
Bharatpur	Bhayana
Deeg	Kaman
Sawai Madhopur	**Gangapur City**
Karauli	Hindaun City
Bhilwara	**Shahpura**
Chittorgarh	Rawatbhata
Udaipur	Kherwara
Udaipur	Sarada
Pali	Falna
Pali	Sumerpur
Pali	Bali
Tonk	**Malpura**

== See also ==
- Outline of Rajasthan
- Government of Rajasthan
- List of tehsils of Rajasthan
- Urban Improvement Trust
- List of cities and towns in Rajasthan
- List of urban local bodies in Rajasthan
- Rajasthan Administrative Service
- List of constituencies of the Rajasthan Legislative Assembly
- List of institutions of higher education in Rajasthan
