= Rajsamand =

Municipal council in Rajasthan, India

Rajsamand Rajnagar–Kankroli
- Municipal Council (Nagar Parishad)
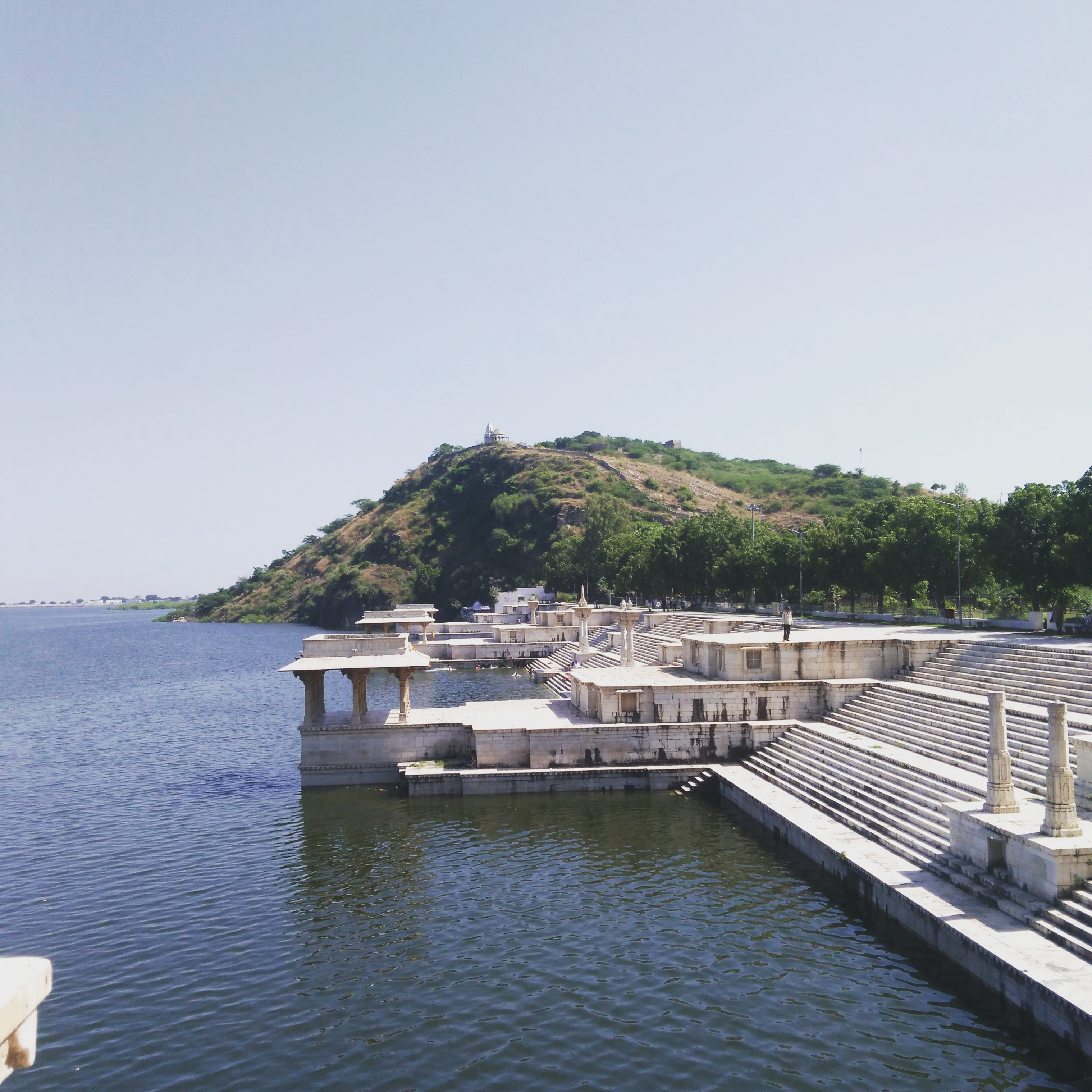
- View of Rajsamand Lake

- Location in Rajasthan, India Rajsamand (India)
- Coordinates: 25.07°N 73.88°E
- Country: India
- State: Rajasthan
- District: Rajsamand
- Municipality established: 19 January 1956
- Upgraded to Nagar Parishad: 30 April 2012
- Named for: Rajsamand Lake
- Constituent twin towns: Rajnagar, Kankroli

Government
  - Type: Municipal Council
  - Body: Nagar Parishad Rajsamand

Area
  - Total: 55 km^{2} (21 sq mi)
- Elevation: 547 m (1,795 ft)

Population (2011)
  - Total: 67,798
  - Density: 1,200/km^{2} (3,200/sq mi)
- Time zone: UTC+5:30 (IST)
- PIN: 313324 (Kankroli), 313333 (Rajnagar)
- Vehicle registration: RJ-30
- Website: rajsamand.rajasthan.gov.in

Rajsamand is a municipal council (Nagar Parishad) and the administrative headquarters of Rajsamand district in the Indian state of Rajasthan. Rather than a single historical town, the municipality was formed by combining the twin towns of Rajnagar and Kankroli, which sit on opposite ends of Rajsamand Lake. Both the municipality and the district take their name from the 17th-century artificial lake built by Maharana Raj Singh I of Mewar.

== History ==
=== Origin of the twin towns ===
The urban area administered as Rajsamand consists of two distinct historical towns situated on opposite sides of Rajsamand Lake: Rajnagar on the northern bank and Kankroli on the southern bank.

Between 1662 and 1676, Maharana Raj Singh I dammed the Gomti River as a famine relief project to create Rajsamand Lake, establishing the royal settlement of Rajnagar alongside it with a hill palace known as Rajmandir. Kankroli developed as a major Pushtimarg pilgrimage centre. In 1670 (Samvat 1727), during the reign of Maharana Maharana Raj Singh, the sacred deity of Lord Dwarkadhish was brought from Mathura to Asotiya village, before being formally installed at the present Dwarkadhish Temple on the southern embankment of Rajsamand Lake in 1776.

=== Administrative evolution ===
During the princely era of Mewar State, Rajnagar served as an administrative headquarters and was later designated a sub-district (Nizamat) following the 1940–41 reorganisation. After Indian independence and the formation of Rajasthan in 1948, it became a subdivision under Udaipur district.

The local civic body was formally established as a municipality on 19 January 1956. When Rajsamand district was carved out of Udaipur district on 10 April 1991, the merged Rajnagar–Kankroli urban area became the district headquarters. On 30 April 2012, the Government of Rajasthan upgraded the civic body to a Municipal Council (Nagar Parishad).

== Geography and climate ==
Rajsamand is located at 25.07°N 73.88°E in the Aravalli Range region of southern Rajasthan, approximately 62 km (39 mi) north of Udaipur. It has an average elevation of 547 metres (1794 ft).

According to the Urban Development & Housing Department, the municipal jurisdiction spans 55 km^{2} (21 sq mi) across 30 wards and incorporates 29 revenue villages, including Rajnagar, Kankroli, Asotiya, Dhoinda, Mohi, Pasund, Sanwad, and Kishornagar.

The region experiences a semi-arid climate. Summer temperatures reach an average daily maximum of 42 °C (108 °F), while winter temperatures drop to an average minimum of 7 °C (45 °F). The average annual rainfall is 571.9 mm (22.52 in).

== Demographics ==
Historical population
| Year | Pop. | ±% |
|---|---|---|
| 1951 | 5,432 | — |
| 1961 | 11,272 | +107.5% |
| 1971 | 14,242 | +26.3% |
| 1981 | 27,492 | +93.0% |
| 1991 | 38,831 | +41.2% |
| 2001 | 55,687 | +43.4% |
| 2011 | 67,798 | +21.7% |
Source: Census of India / UDH Rajasthan

Religions in Rajsamand
| Religion | Percent |
| Hindus | 84.17% |
| Muslims | 9.54% |

As of the 2011 Census of India, the Rajsamand municipal area had a population of 67,798 (up from 5,432 in 1951). The broader Rajsamand district had a population of 987,024 (493,459 male and 493,565 female), with an average literacy rate of 67% (77% male and 57% female), and 15% of the population under 6 years of age.

== Economy ==
Although much of Rajasthan's economy relies on agriculture, this region is rich in mineral resources and is one of India's primary suppliers of marble, granite, limestone, and other varieties of stone. Nearby mining belts—including Rajpura Dariba and Sindesar Khurd—are principal Indian sources of zinc, lead, and silver ores. Alongside mining and stone processing, the local economy is supported by manufacturing, including the JK Tyre plant located in Kankroli.

== Transport ==
- Road: Rajsamand sits on National Highway 8 (NH-8 / NH-48), linking it directly to Udaipur, Ajmer, Jaipur, Delhi, Ahmedabad, and Mumbai. It also lies at the junction of Rajasthan State Highway 12 (Kankroli–Deoli road), connecting toward Bhilwara.
- Rail: The urban area is served by Kankroli railway station on the Mavli–Marwar Junction line.

== Places of interest ==
Located about 62 km (39 mi) north of Udaipur, Rajsamand is surrounded by the Aravalli hills.

- Rajsamand Lake & Nau Chauki: A 17th-century artificial lake measuring approximately 6.5 km (4.0 mi) in length and 3 km (1.9 mi) in width. Its white-marble embankment in Rajnagar, known as Nau Chauki, features ornate pavilions and the Raj Prashasti stone inscriptions.
- Dwarkadhish Temple, Kankroli: Situated on the southern embankment in Kankroli, this historic temple is one of the seven primary shrines (Peethas) of the Pushtimarg tradition.
- Dayalshah Fort (Jain Temple): A hilltop Jain temple and fortification built by Dayalshah, a minister of Maharana Raj Singh I.
