= Natural resources of India =

Natural resources in India

The total cultivable area in India was reported as 155,369,076 hectares (52.3% of its total land area) as of 2020, and is shrinking due to over-farming, increased livestock grazing, deforestation, urban growth, and severe weather events. India has a total water surface area of 314,070 km^{2}.

India's major mineral resources include coal (Fourth largest reserves in the world), iron ore, manganese ore (Seventh largest reserve in the world as in 2013), lithium ore (sixth largest reserve in the world as in 2023), mica, bauxite (fifth largest reserve in the world as in 2013), chromite, natural gas, diamonds, limestone and thorium. India's oil reserves, found in Bombay High off the coast of Maharashtra, Gujarat, Rajasthan and in eastern Assam meet 25% of the country's demand.

A national level agency National Natural Resources Management System (NNRMS) was established in 1983 for integrated natural resources management in the country. It is supported by the Planning Commission (India) and the Department of Space.

== Coal ==
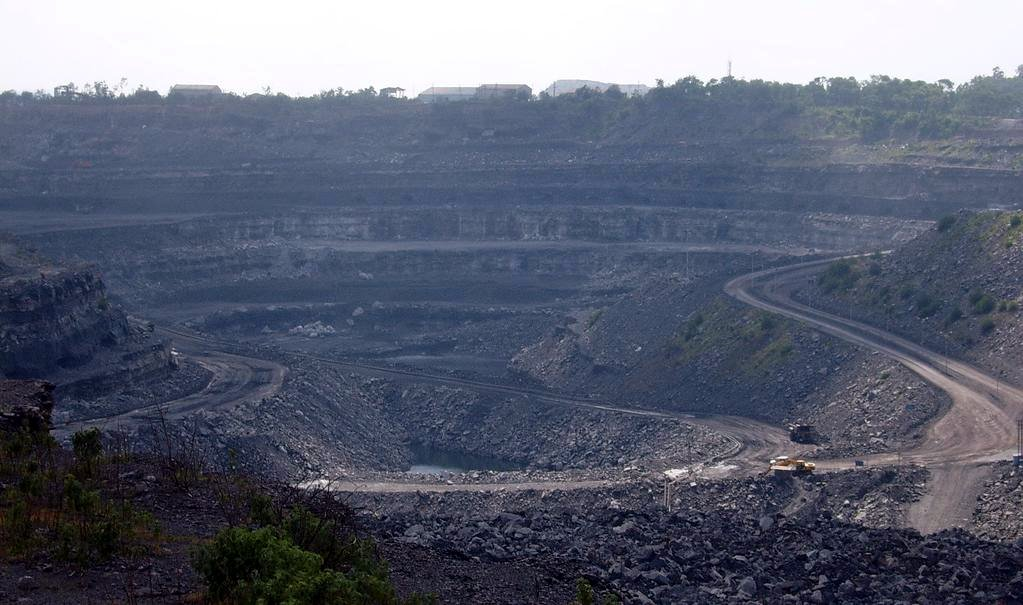
Coal mine in Dhanbad district of Jharkhand state

Coal mining in India started in 1774 through the East India Company in the Raniganj Coalfield, which is along the western bank of the Damodar River in the Indian state of West Bengal. Growth of Indian coal mining started when steam locomotives were introduced in 1853. Production increased to million tonnes. Production reached 30 million tonnes in 1946. After Independence, the National Coal Development Corporation was set up and colleries were owned by the railways. India consumes coal mainly for the power sector. Other industries like cement, fertilizer, chemical and paper rely on coal for energy.

== Oil ==
India had about 100 million tonnes of proven oil reserves as of April 1978, or 1 billion barrels as per EIA estimate for 2020, which is the second-largest amount in the Asia-Pacific region behind China. Most of India's crude oil reserves are located on the western coast (Mumbai High) and in the southeastern parts of the country, although considerable undeveloped reserves are also located in the offshore Bay of Bengal and in the state of Rajasthan. The combination of rising oil consumption and fairly unwavering production levels leaves India highly dependent on imports to meet its consumption needs. In 2010, India produced an average of about 33.69 million tonnes of crude oil as of April 2010 or 877 thousand barrels per day as per EIA estimate of 2009. During 2006, India consumed an estimated 2.63 Mbbl/d (418,000 m^{3}/d) of oil. The EIA estimates that India registered oil demand growth of 100,000 bbl/d (16,000 m^{3}/d) during 2006. As of 2013 India Produces 30% of India's resources mostly in Rajasthan.

India's state-owned Oil and Natural Gas Corporation (ONGC) is the largest oil company in India. ONGC is the leading sport in India's downstream sector, accounting for roughly three-fourths of the country's oil output during 2006, as per Indian government estimates. As a net importer of all oil, the Indian Government has introduced policies aimed at growing domestic oil production and oil exploration activities. As part of the effort, the Ministry of Petroleum and Natural Gas crafted the New Exploration License Policy (NELP) in 2000, which permits foreign companies to hold 100% equity possession in oil and natural gas projects. However, to date, only a handful of oil fields are controlled by foreign firms. India's downstream sector is also dominated by state-owned entities, though private companies have enlarged their market share in past recent years.

== Natural gas ==
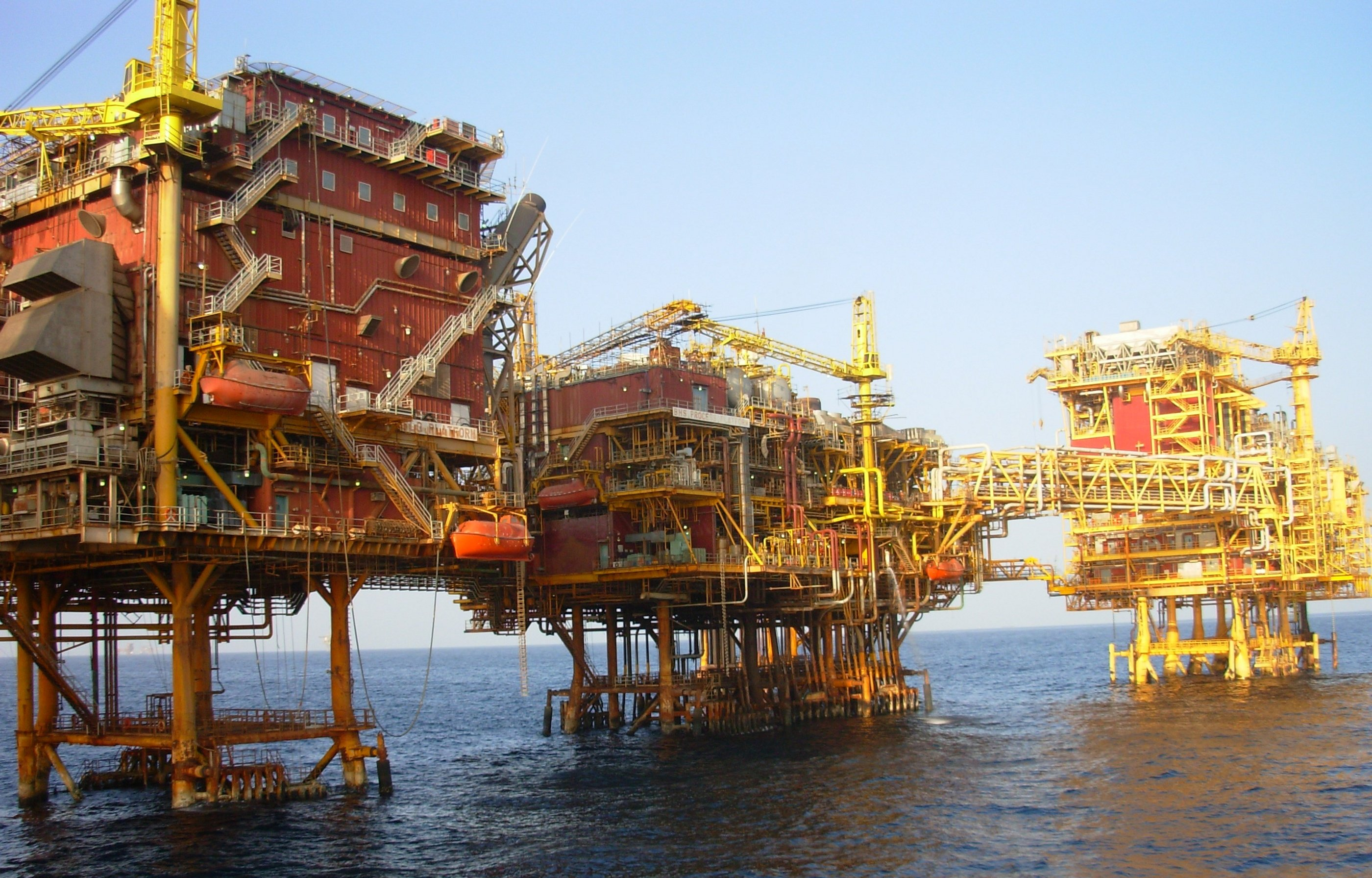
Oil and gas processing platform at Bombay High

As per the Ministry of Petroleum, Government of India, India has 1,437 billion cubic metres (50.7×10^{12} cu ft) of confirmed natural gas reserves as of April 2010. A huge mass of India's natural gas production comes from the western offshore regions, particularly the Mumbai High complex. The onshore fields in Assam, Tripura, Andhra Pradesh, Telangana and Gujarat states are also major producers of natural gas. As per EIA data, India produced 996 billion cubic feet (2.82×10^{10} m^{3}) of natural gas in 2004. India imports small amounts of natural gas. In 2004, India consumed about 1,089×10^{9} cu ft (3.08×10^{10} m^{3}) of natural gas, the first year in which the country showed net natural gas imports. During 2004, India imported 93×10^{9} cu ft (2.6×10^{9} m^{3}) of liquefied natural gas (LNG) from Qatar.

As in the oil sector, India's state-owned companies account for the bulk of natural gas production. ONGC and Oil India Limited. are the leading companies with respect to production volume, while some foreign companies take part in upstream developments in joint-ventures and production sharing contracts. Reliance Industries, a privately owned Indian company, also has a role in the natural gas sector as a result of a large natural gas find in 2002 in the Krishna Godavari basin.

The Gas Authority of India Ltd. (GAIL) holds an effective control on natural gas transmission and allocation activities. In December 2006, the Minister of Petroleum and Natural Gas issued a new policy that allows foreign investors, private domestic companies, and Government oil companies to hold up to 100% equity stakes in pipeline projects. While GAIL's domination in natural gas transmission and allocation is not ensured by statute, it will continue to be the leading player in the sector because of its existing natural gas infrastructure.

== Nuclear ==
India's proven nuclear reserves include uranium and thorium.

=== Uranium ===
AMD has established 433 thousand tonnes in-situ of uranium oxide resource across 47 uranium deposits.

In 2003, following a directive from the Central Ministry of Environment and Forests, a uranium mining project in the Rajiv Gandhi Tiger Reserve (in Nalgonda District, Telangana) sparked public outcry, as 3,000 sq. kilometres were to be allocated for the project.

In 2007, India was able to extract 229 tonnes of U_{3}O_{8} from its soil. On 19 July 2011, Indian officials announced that the Tumalapalli mine in the Andhra Pradesh state of India could provide more than 170,000 tonnes of uranium, making it the world's largest uranium mine. Production of the ore is slated to begin in 2012.

The Department of Atomic Energy (DAE) recently discovered that the upcoming mine in Tumalapalli has close to 49,000 tonnes of uranium reserves. This could help India's nuclear power aspirations as it is three times the original estimate of the area's deposits.

=== Thorium ===
The IAEA's 2005 report estimates India's reasonably assured reserves of thorium at 319,000 tonnes, but mentions recent reports of India's reserves at 650,000 tonnes. A government of India estimate, shared in the country's Parliament in August 2011, puts the recoverable reserve at 846,477 tonnes. The Indian Minister of State V. Narayanasamy stated that as of May 2013, the country's thorium reserves were 11.93 million tonnes (monazite, having 9-10% ThO_{2}), with a significant majority (8.59 Mt; 72%) found in the three eastern coastal states of Andhra Pradesh (3.72 Mt; 31%), Tamil Nadu (2.46 Mt; 21%) and Odisha (2.41 Mt; 20%). Both the IAEA and OECD appear to conclude that India may possess the largest share of world's thorium deposits.

== Biotic resources ==
Biotic resources are obtained from living and organic material. These include forest products, wildlife, crops and other living organisms. Most of these resources are renewable because they can be regenerated by themselves. Fossil fuels are considered as biotic because they are formed from decayed organic matter. Fossil fuels are non-renewable.

=== Population ===
India is the world's most populated country, having surpassed China in 2023. Although population growth in India has slowed, the country's population is expected to grow and hit a peak of 1.7 billion people by 2064. India's replacement level fertility rate is 2, as of 2023. Replacement levels in the country's larger states range from 1.6 for Punjab and West Bengal, and 3 for Bihar. India's replacement level fertility rate is 2, as of 2023. As of 2023, the average age of India's population is 28.2 years.

India being the world's most populated country has been stated to be an asset for the country. Being the most populated country in the world could further reinforce India's claim for a permanent seat in the United Nations Security Council. India's young and large population also has advantages for the country's economy. The country's working-age population is projected to reach 1 billion people by 2031. India's working-age population growth is accounting for 23% of the world's working-age population growth between 2020 and 2025. India's large labour force is young, lower paid, English speaking, digitally learned and entrepreneurial, making the country an especially appealing destination for Western corporations that are looking to diversify their manufacturing centres from China.

=== Forestry ===
As of 2020, India had the 10th largest forest cover in the world. From 2010 to 2020, India was the country with the 3rd largest maximum average annual net gains in forest area and accounted for 2% of the world's total forest area. In 2021, India's total forest cover was 80.9 million hectares, which is 24.62% of the country's land area. According to the India State of Forest Report of 2021, India's forest cover increased by 2,261 square kilometres from 2019 to 2021. According to the same report, in 17 states and union territories, more than 33% of land was covered in forests. Madhya Pradesh is the state with the largest area of forest cover and Mizoram has the highest forest cover as a percentage of the total area of the state. The Indian Forest Service is responsible for conservation and biodiversity protection in India's forests. The country's forests are governed by the National Forest Policy,1988.

India has moist and dry tropical, temperate and subtropical montane, alpine and scrub forests. India has a large forest economy. The forests support the livelihood of approximately 275 million people, who depend on India's forests for food, fuelwood, fodder and other products. Non-timber forest products, are the largest unorganized economic sector in the country, with a sector having revenue that exceeds $788 million. Raw materials from India's forests are used in many industries, which include processed foods and confectionery, pharmaceuticals, alternative medicine, cosmetics and perfumery, and paper and pulp.

=== Fish ===
As of 2020, India ranks second in aquaculture and third in fisheries production. Fisheries contributes 1.07% to India's gross domestic product (GDP) and employs 145 million people, as of 2020. According to the Ministry of Fisheries, Animal Husbandry and Dairying, fish production increased from 7.52 lakh tonnes in the year 1950–51 to 125.90 lakh tonnes in the year 2018–19, an increase of seventeen times. During the 2021 fiscal year, India's fish production was 14.73 million tonnes. From 2021 to 2022, $7.76 billion worth of marine products were exported from India. India has a long history in fishing and aquaculture. Aquaculture is carried out in fresh water bodies and brackish water bodies. In Indian rivers more than 400 species of fish are found, many of which are economically important. Shrimp, sardines, mackerels, carangid, croakers and other varieties are available. Major fish species available are carp, catfish, murrel and weed fish.

== Abiotic resources ==
Abiotic resources are obtained from the non-living and non-organic material. Some of the resources, like water and air, are renewable. Other resources like minerals are non-renewable and exhaustible because they cannot be regenerated. Minerals have many categories like metallic, non-metallic and minor minerals.

=== Metallic minerals ===
Metallic minerals are the minerals which contain one or more metallic elements. They occur in rare, naturally formed concentrations known as mineral deposits. Metallic minerals available in India are gold, cobalt, zinc, iron ore, manganese ore, bauxite, silver, lead, tin, copper and chromite.

==== Chromite ====
Chromite is an oxide of chromium and iron. It is the only commercial source of chromium. As of 2022, India accounts for 20% of the world's production of chromite. As of 2022, India is also the world's 4th largest chromium producer and the country's chromium production was 4.2 million MT in the same year. As of 2010, India had 200 million tonnes of resource. Odisha accounts for 98% of India's chromite deposits. Minor amount of resources are available from Manipur, Nagaland, Karnataka, Jharkhand, Maharashtra, Tamil Nadu and Andhra Pradesh. It is mostly mined by opencast method. Chromium provides additional strength to the alloys and it is resistant to corrosion, so it is mainly used in metallurgical applications. It can withstand sudden temperature changes, so it is used in refractories. It is also used in chemical applications. In 2020, Tata Steel Mining, a subsidiary of Tata Steel, started chromite mining operations in Odisha.

==== Copper ====
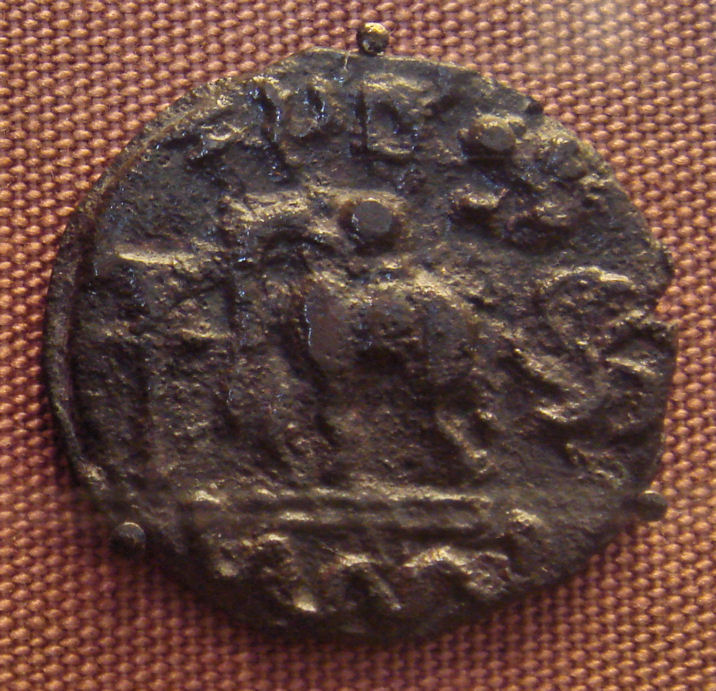
1st-century B.C. copper coin signifies the usage of copper in India since ancient times.

Copper has been used in India since ancient times. In 2022, the Archaeological Survey of India found copper anthropomorphic figures and weapons that could potentially date back to 1600 to 2000 BC. Details of copper mining and metallurgy are available in ancient works like the Arthashastra. In India, consumers of copper include the real estate, home appliance manufacturing and renewable energy sectors, such as electric vehicles, solar power and wind turbines. As of 2019, India has approximately 2% of the world copper reserves and the country accounts for 0.2% of the world's copper production. India does not have a large number of copper mines and the mines in the country are primarily concentrated in Rajasthan, Madhya Pradesh, Bihar and Jharkhand. Sterlite Copper, Hindalco Industries and Hindustan Copper are the three companies that dominate India's copper industry.

==== Gold ====
As of 2020, India's gold production was 1.6 tonnes. In 2022, the Reserve Bank of India had total gold reserves of 787.4 tonnes. India had the world's 9th largest gold reserves in 2022, and also became the world's 4th largest gold recycling country in the same year. The country has increased its organised gold refining capacity, with an increase from just 300 tons in 2013 to approximately 1,800 tons in 2021. India has only 0.75% of total world gold production. As of 2022, the Hutti Gold Mine, located in the Raichur district of Karnataka, is the only significant gold producer in the country.

==== Iron ore ====
As of 2023, India is the world's 4th largest exporter of iron ore. The country also accounts for 9.2% of the world's iron ore production as of 2023. In 2021, the value of India's iron ore exports were $4.2 billion. As of 2019, India has the world's 7th largest iron ore reserves, with reserves of 5.5 billion tonnes. Hematite and magnetite are the most prevalent iron ores found in the country. The major amount of hematite is found in Orissa, Jharkhand, Chhattisgarh, Karnataka and Goa. Minor amounts of hematite are found in Andhra Pradesh, Assam, Bihar, Maharashtra, Madhya Pradesh, Meghalaya, Rajasthan and Uttar Pradesh. Most magnetite is found in Karnataka, Andhra Pradesh, Rajasthan and Tamil Nadu. Minor amounts of magnetite are found in Assam, Bihar, Goa, Jharkhand, Kerala, Maharashtra, Meghalaya and Nagaland. Mining is done by the opencast method. Iron ore is mainly used for manufacturing of pig iron, sponge iron and steel. It is also used in coal washeries, cement and glass industries. As of 2021, NMDC is India's largest public sector iron ore producing company. As of 2023, Vedanta Limited is the country's largest private company in iron ore production and the second largest producer overall in India. Tata Steel is another prominent private company that mines iron ore.

==== Lithium ====
In February 2023, the Geological Survey of India (GSI) found 5.9 million metric tonnes of lithium in Reasi District of Jammu, making India the country with the world's 7th largest lithium resources. In April 2023, the process for auctioning mining rights for the lithium was started. Lithium reserves of 1600 tonnes were also found in Karnataka in 2021. Between 2023 and 2024, the GSI will also undertake lithium exploration in Himachal Pradesh and Uttarakhand due to the topographical and geological similarities to Jammu and Kashmir.

==== Manganese ====
As of 2021, India is the world's 7th largest producer of manganese. The country produced 600,000 tonnes of manganese in 2021. The majority of the manganese produced in India is used in steel production. It is found in Karnataka, Madhya Pradesh, Maharashtra. As of 2022, MOIL is India's largest producer of manganese ore and operates 11 mines.

==== Nickel ====
As of 2023, Vedanta Limited is India's sole producer of nickel. 93% of the country nickel resources are found in Odisha.

==== Silver ====
As of 2022, India is the 11th largest silver producer in the world. The country also accounts for 3% of the world's silver production. India's largest silver mine is the Sindesar Khurd Mine, in Rajasthan. Hindustan Zinc Limited (HZL) is India's largest silver producer. As of 2022, HZL is also the world's 5th largest silver producer.

==== Zinc ====
As of 2022, India has the world's 6th largest zinc reserves. There is evidence that zinc production took place in Rajasthan in the 6th century BC. References to medicinal uses of zinc are present in the Charaka Samhita, written between 300 and 500 AD. Mines in Zawar, Rajasthan, date back to the 9th century and are among the oldest evidence of zinc mines in India. Zinc is recovered from a number of different zinc ores. The types of zinc ores include sulfide, carbonate, silicate and oxide. Zinc is used in galvanisation, batteries, electrical goods and equipment, hardware, communication equipment, musical instruments and machinery. It is also used as white pigment in paints. HZL is the country's largest integrated producer of zinc and as of 2023, the company an 80% market share in primary zinc production in India. As of 2023, HZL is also the second largest integrated zinc producer in the world. Rampura Agucha, owned by HZL, is the world's largest underground zinc mine as of 2022. India's 5 largest zinc mines are located in Rajasthan. A minor amount of resources are available in Andhra Pradesh, Madhya Pradesh, Bihar and Maharashtra states.

=== Non-metallic minerals ===
Non-metallic minerals are those which do not yield new products on melting. They are generally associated with sedimentary rocks. Non-Metallic minerals available from India are phosphorite, dolomite, gypsum, garnet, wollastonite, vermiculite, ochre, perlite, bentonite, asbestos, cadmium, felspar, soapstone, kaolin, sillimanite, limestone, diatomite, pyrophyllite, fluorite, vanadium, dunite, ilmenite, gallium and zircon.

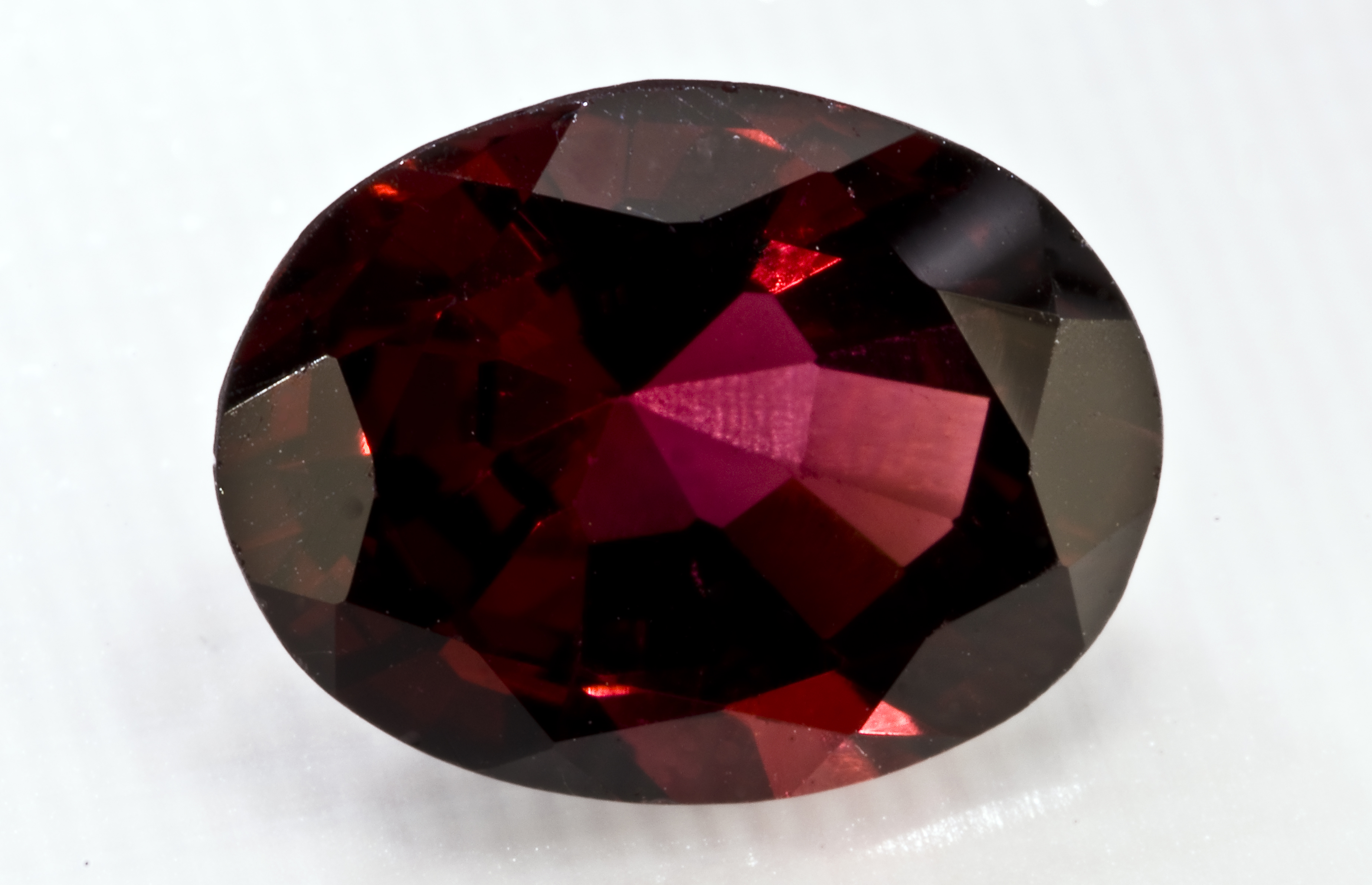
Almandine (garnet group) from Rajasthan

==== Garnet group ====
It is a group of complex silicate minerals and has similar chemical compositions. There are three groups of garnet - aluminum-garnet group, chromium-garnet group, and iron-garnet group. The minerals in aluminium-garnet group are almandine, grossularite, pyrope, and spessartine. The mineral in Iron-garnet group is andradite. The mineral in chromium-garnet group is uvarovite. Garnet group minerals occur in different rock types. It is a hard substance. It is resistant to chemical exposure. It is used as a semi-precious stone and also in abrasives, sand blasting, water filtration materials and water jet cutting. Garnets are available in Andhra Pradesh, Chhattisgarh, Jharkhand, Kerala, Orissa, Rajasthan and Tamil Nadu. It is also found in beach sands of Kerala, Orissa and Tamil Nadu states. In 2007–08, India produced 8,73,000 tonnes.

==== Wollastonite ====
It is a meta-silicate of calcium. It is mostly white in color and occurs as bladed or needle like crystals. In 2010, India had 16 million tonnes of resource. Most of the deposits are available in Rajasthan (Dungarpur, Pali, Sirohi and Udaipur districts). Minor amount of deposits are found in Gujarat and Tamil Nadu. It is mainly used in ceramic industries and metallurgical applications. It is also used as a filler in wall tiles, paint, rubber and plastic. India is one of the largest reserves. In 2011, India produced 150,000 tons. It is mined by opencast method. It is also used as a substitute for short-fibre asbestos in brake-linings. Central Building Research Institute has found that wollastonite can be used as substitute for chrysotile asbestos in cement products.

==== Sillimanite group ====
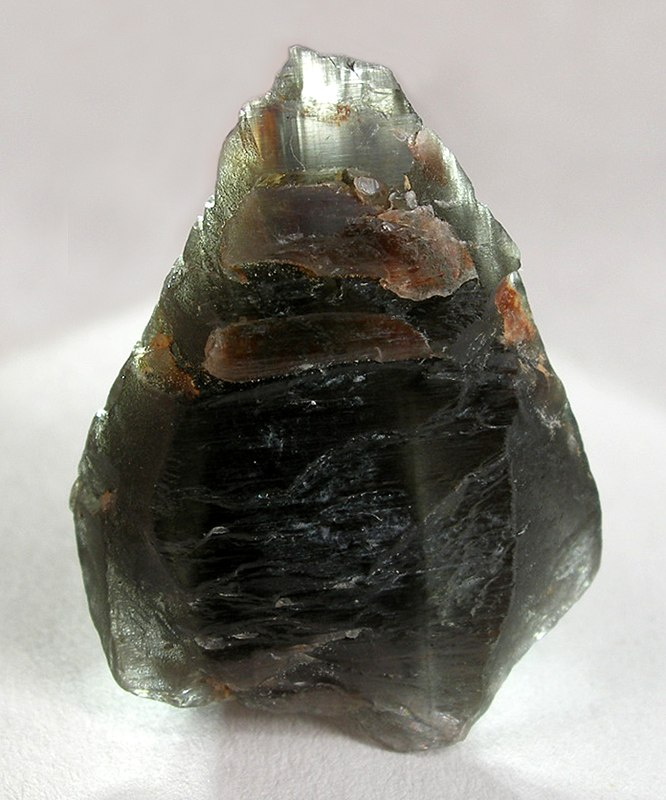
Sillimanite from Orissa

It is a group of metamorphic minerals - sillimanite, kyanite and andalusite. It looks like a crystal. These are polymorphs of alumino-silicate. These are formed under high-pressure and high-temperature conditions. The three minerals are calcined to form mullite. Mainly used as refractory materials. As of 2010, India had 66 million tonnes of sillimanite, 100 million tonnes of Kyanite and 18 million tonnes of Andalusite as a resource. Most of the resources are found in Tamil Nadu, Orissa, Uttar Pradesh, Andhra Pradesh, Kerala and Assam. A minor amount of resources are found in Jharkhand, Karnataka, Madhya Pradesh, Maharashtra, Meghalaya, Rajasthan and West Bengal. Granular sillimanite is available in beach sands of South India. Sillimanite refractory bricks are used in steel, glass and petrochemical industries. In 2004, India produced 14,500 tonnes of sillimanite and 6200 tonnes of kyanite.

==== Ilmenite ====
It is a compound of iron and titanium. It will be iron-black or steel-gray in color. It is a non-toxic material used in biomedical substances. Institute of Minerals and Materials Technology has developed an environmentally friendly technology for processing ilmenite. It is also used in production of titanium dioxide pigment. It is available in Kerala, Tamil Nadu and Orissa. Mining is done at Chavara, Chatrapur, Aluva and Manavalakurichi by Indian Rare Earths limited. As of 2013, India has 21% of the world's reserves and constitutes 6% of the world's production.

==== Pyrophyllite ====
It is a hydrous alumino-silicate. It is chemically inert, has high melting point and low electrical conductivity. It is used in refractories, foundry dressings, pesticides, ceramics and rubber. It is available as hydrothermal deposits. The physical and optical properties are pyrophyllite are similar to talc. It is also used in electrical insulators, sanitary-ware and in the glass industry. As of 2010, India had 56 million tonnes of this resource. Most of the resources are found in Madhya Pradesh (Chhatarpur, Tikamgarh and Shivpuri districts). The remaining resources are found in Orissa, Uttar Pradesh, Andhra Pradesh, Maharashtra and Rajasthan. In 2010, India produced 1.5 million tonnes.

=== Minor minerals ===
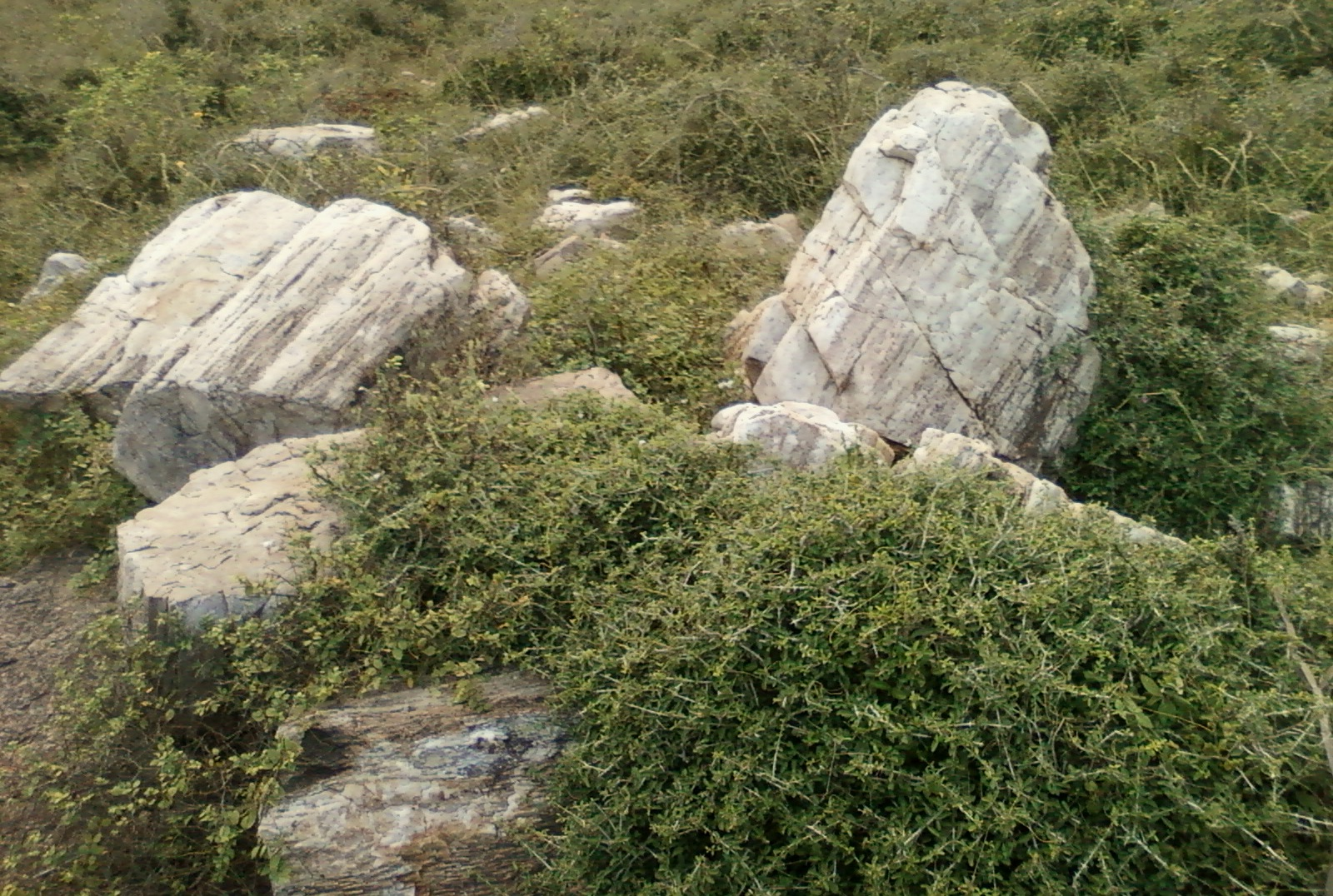
Quartzite rocks in North Coastal Andhra Pradesh

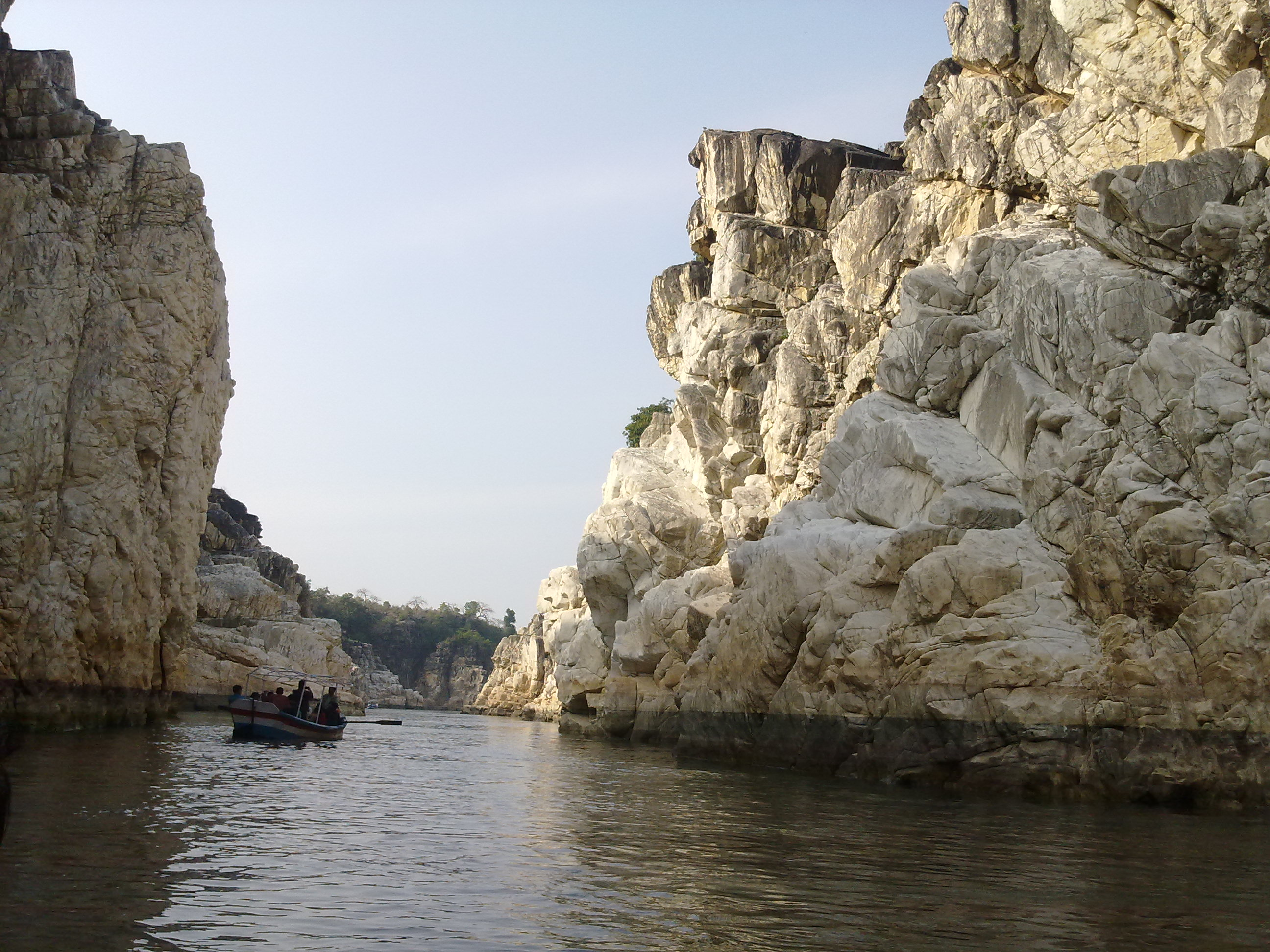
White marble rocks in Madhya Pradesh

Minor minerals available are building stone, brick earth, quartzite, marble, granite, gravel, clay and sand. These are mainly used in building constructions. Environmental impact of mining these minerals was significant over a period of time even the area was small. Impacts were increasing water scarcity, damage to river beds and adverse effects on biodiversity. So from 2012 onwards, mining of these minerals are to be done after clearance from the Ministry of Environment and Forests.

==== Marble ====
Marble is a metamorphosed limestone formed by re-crystallization. It is available in different colours and textures. Marble deposits are available in many states of India. It has been used in India for a long time. It was used in construction of Temples, Tombs and Palaces. Now it is also used for flooring in homes and offices. It is preferred for flooring because of its durability and water resistance. Marbles which are economically important are available in Rajasthan, Gujarat, Haryana, Andhra Pradesh and Madhya Pradesh. As of 2010, there was 1931 million tonnes of resource, including all grades of marble. Based on the chemical composition, types of Marble available are Calcite, Dolomitic, Siliceous Limestone, Serpentine and Travertine marbles. Other than construction, it is used in Paint and Agricultural lime.

== See also ==
- Mining in India
- Geological Survey of India
- MOIL Limited
- Geology of India
- Agriculture in India
- Advanced Materials and Processes Research Institute
- National Environmental Engineering Research Institute
