= Koshithal =

- Village
- Location in Rajasthan, India Koshithal (India)
- Coordinates: 25.3107983°N 74.1804083°E
- Country: India
- State: Rajasthan
- District: Bhilwara
- Tehsil: Sahara

Government
  - Type: Rajasthan Government
  - Body: Gram Panchayat
  - Sarpanch: Noratan Salavi INC

Area
  - Total: 32 km^{2} (12 sq mi)
- Elevation: 565 m (1,854 ft)

Population (2011)
  - Total: 7,153
  - Density: 220/km^{2} (580/sq mi)

Languages
  - Official: Hindi, Mewari
- Time zone: UTC+5:30 (IST)
- PIN: 311805
- Telephone code: 01481
- ISO 3166 code: RJ-IN
- Vehicle registration: RJ-06
- Sex ratio: 1000/1050 ♂/♀
- Literacy Rate: 51.34
- Nearest City: Gangapur, Udaipur, Bhilwara

Koshithal is a Gram Panchayat and Village Located in Sahara tehsil, nearby Gangapur town in Bhilwara District of Ajmer division in the Indian State of Rajasthan. It is located in Raipur Vidhan Sabha which governed by MLA Gayatri Kailash Trivedi Of Indian National Congress. Koshithal is largest and one of the most important Gram Panchayat in Bhilwara District. As of 2011, the population of Koshithal is 7153 having almost 1447 households. It is located 300 kms (186 miles) southwest of the state capital Jaipur and 60 kms (37 miles) away from District Headquarter Bhilwara. The village have historically rich history contemporary with Maharana Pratap. It is known for Koshithal Fort and for public cemetery where many War Martyr cremated. It is belief that Koshithal has large number of War Martyr Cremated in Local Cemetery after Chittaurgarh in Rajasthan.

Nearest airports are Udaipur 120 kms (74 miles) and Jaipur 300 kms (186 miles) and nearest Railway Station is Bhilwara (BHL) and Charbhuja Road (CBG) which controlled by Ajmer division of North Western Railway zone. It connected by Rajasthan State Road Transport Corporation and Other private travels agencies like Pasharvanath, ShreeNath, RK travels, Mundra travels etc operated buses to many parts of Rajasthan and Indian cities like Ahmedabad, Mumbai, Indore, Surat, Baroda etc.

== Geography of Koshithal ==
Koshithal is located at 25.3131°N 74.1842°E. It has an average elevation of 508 metres (1,667 ft). The village is situated in NorthEast of the plains of Mewar Region. Nearest cities are Gangapur, Amet, Bhilwara & Devgarh.

== History ==
Koshithal village was taken by Chundawat narharidas ji in the Year 1705 . Narharidas ji was grandson of Veer Shiromani Fatta Ji who was fifth generation of Mahrana Lakha's elder son Chunda ji Narharidas ji was awarded with ( padavi ) of "Umrao" by Maharana Raj Singh ji for his bravery. Present thakur saab of koshithal is manohar Singh ji and he has been active in politics from 1985, he became the first nirvirodh pradhan of sahara tehsil (gangapur) . .

== Demographics ==
According to the 2011 Census of India, Koshithal had a population of 7153. Males constituted 48.78% of the population and females 51.22%. Average Sex Ratio of Koshithal village is 1050 which is higher than state average of 928 Child Sex Ratio for the Koshithal as per census is 961, higher than state average of 888. Koshithal had an average literacy rate of 51.34%, lower than the state average of 66.11%. 63.54% of the males and 39.71% of females were literate. 15.66% of the population is under 6 years of age. The substantial population of Koshithal was Schedule Caste (SC) constitutes 27.54% while Schedule Tribe (ST) were 4.18% and rest 68.28% are from other Categories like General, OBC, MBC, SBC etc.

Castes in Koshithal
Schedule Caste	27.54%
Schedule Tribe	4.18%
others	68.28%
Distribution of Castes

Growth in population of Koshithal Village has been represented by population data of year 1991, 2001 and 2011.

Population growth through the years
Year	Population
1991	5,156
2001	6,138
2011	7,153
