= Gangapur =

Gangapur may refer to:

== India ==
- Gangapur, Maharashtra
- Gangapur, Odisha, Surada, Ganjam district
- Gangapur, Odisha, Gram Panchayat in Odisha, India
- Gangapur, Varanasi, City in Uttar Pradesh, India
- Gangapur, Rajasthan (disambiguation)
  - Gangapur City
    - Gangapur City railway station
  - Gangapur City District, district of Rajasthan state of India
  - Gangapur, Bhilwara, city in Bhilwara district, Rajasthan
- Gangapur, Varanasi, Uttar Pradesh
- Gangapur, North 24 Parganas, West Bengal

== Elsewhere ==
- Gangapur, Nepal
- Ghangha Pur, Punjab, Pakistan

== Other uses ==
- Gangapur, Maharashtra Assembly constituency, Constituency of the Maharashtra legislative assembly in India
- Gangapur, Rajasthan Assembly constituency, Legislative Assembly constituency in Rajasthan State, India
- Gangapur Dam, Dam in Nashik
