= SPINFED =

SPINFED is a state undertaking in Rajasthan. It a federation of cooperative spinning mills of Rajasthan. It came into existence on 1 April 1993.

== Function ==
It is founded to plan and implement cotton programmes in co-operative sector of Rajasthan. It also aims at insuring quality cotton yarn.

== Mills under Spinfed ==
Under Spinfed total 4 mills are working, as follows:-

- 1 Rajasthan co-operative Spinning mills ltd. Gulabpura, District Bhilwara.
- 2 Gangapur co-operative Spinning mills ltd. Gangapur, District Bhilwara.311801
- 3 Gulabpura Ginning and Pressing Sahkari Samiti ltd. Gulabpura, District Bhilwara
- 4 Ganganagar Sahkari Spinning Samiti ltd. Hanumangarh, District Hunumangarh
