= List of archaeological sites in Rajasthan =

List of a Wikimedia project

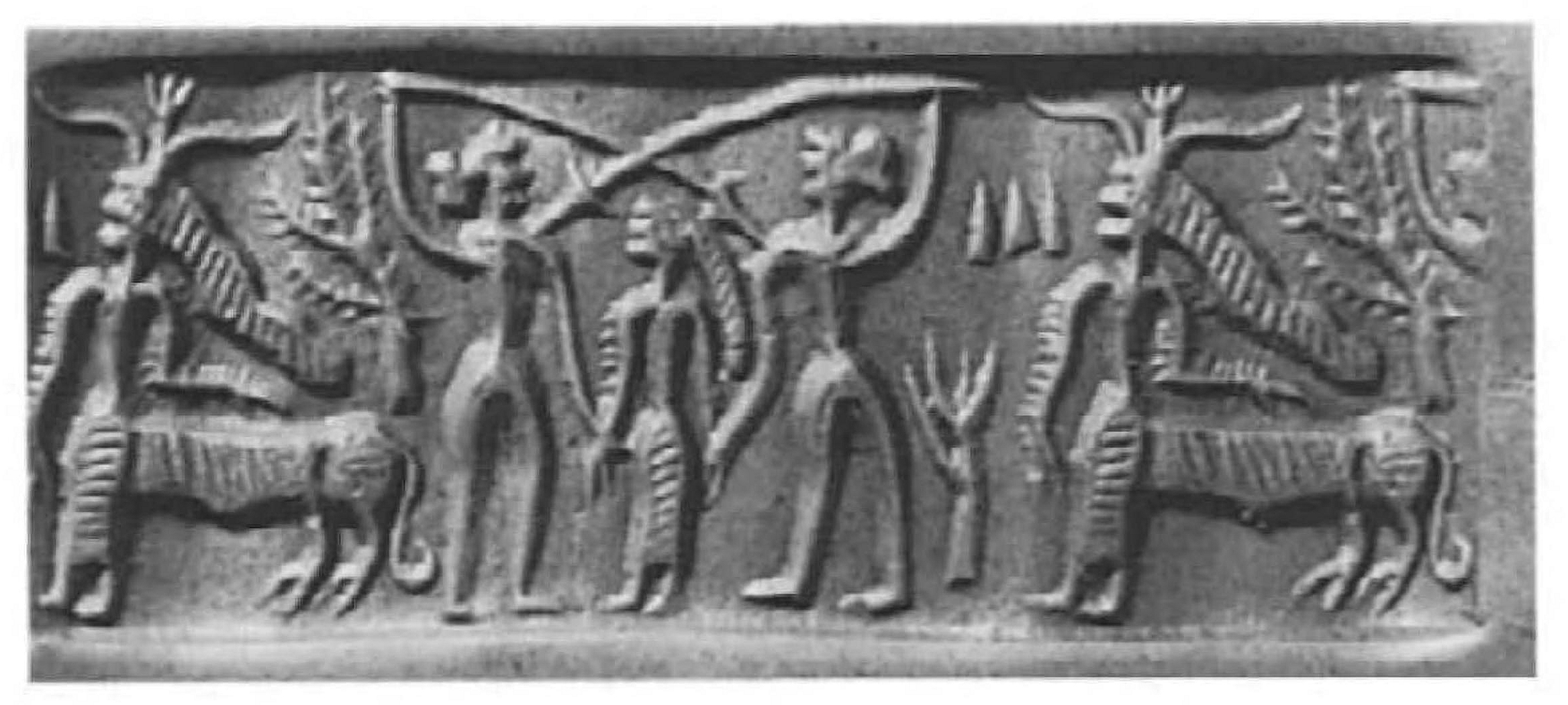
Kalibangan cylinder seal (impression)

- Archaeological sites in Rajasthan
  - Stone Age
    - Paleolithic
      - Jayal
      - Indragarh
      - Viratnagar
      - Gogakheda (Rajsamand)
    - Middle Paleolithic
      - Bagor
      - Tilwara
      - Sojat (Pali)
      - Nimbahera (Chittorgarh District)
      - Pachpadra (Barmer District)
    - Neolithic
      - Hamirgarh (Bhilwara)
      - Viratnagar (Jaipur District)
      - Bharani (Tonk)
      - Sohanpura (Sikar)
      - Harsoura (Alwar)
      - Samdari (Barmer)
      - Alaniya (Kota)
  - Chalcolithic
      - Kalibangan (Hanumangarh District)
  - Bronze Age
      - Ahar (Udaipur)
      - Ganeshwar (Sikar)
      - Giloond (Rajsamand)
      - Jhadol (Udaipur)
      - Pindpadliyan (Chittorgarh)
      - Kurara (Nagaur)
      - Sabaniya and Pugal (Bikaner)
      - Nandalalpura (Jaipur)
      - Kiradot (Jaipur)
      - Chithwadi (Jaipur)
      - Elana (Jalore)
      - Budha Pushkar (Ajmer)
      - Kol Maholi (Sri Madhopur)
      - Malah (Bharatpur)
      - Balathal (Udaipur)
      - Ojhiyana archaeological site(Bhilwara District)
  - Iron Age
      - Noh (Bharatpur)
      - Jodhpura (Jaipur)
      - Sunari (Jhunjhunu)
      - Raidh (Tonk)
      - Eesawal (Udaipur)
      - Bairath (Jaipur District)
      - Nagari (Chittorgarh)
      - Baror (Sri Ganganagar District)
      - Naliyasar (Jaipur)
      - Bhinmal (Jalore District)
      - Singod (Jaipur)
