= Moil =

Moil may refer to:

== Places ==
- Moil Castle, Argyll and Bute, Scotland
- Moil, Northern Territory, Australia

== Other ==
- MOIL, Indian ore mining company
- Moil or Ngan'gi language
