= Motras =

- Village
- Location in Rajasthan, India Motras (India)
- Coordinates: 25.73°N 74.33°E
- Country: India
- State: Rajasthan
- District: Bhilwara
- Founder: Mr. Mota ji, Mr. Jugul Kishor purohit

Government
  - Member of legislative assembly: Mr. Ram Lal Gurjar
- Elevation: 467 m (1,532 ft)

Population (2001)
  - Total: 3,700

Languages
  - Official: Hindi
  - Local: Mewari
- Time zone: UTC+5:30 (IST)
- Postal code: 311204
- STD code: 01480
- ISO 3166 code: RJ-IN

Motras is a village and gram panchayat in Bhilwara district in the state of Rajasthan, India. It is located in the Aravalli hills, on the banks of the Khari River in Bhilwara District, 70 km north-east of Bhilwara. This village is famous for its temple of Pabu ji Maharaj. The village has a post office, community building, sahakari bank, School and many administrative hub for major villages. Some of major villages are Gandhi Nagar, Hatundi, Akshygarh, Hamirgarh, Dedla, Modi mangri, sawigarh, jwanpura, Blhad ka padav, Dulha ji ka badhiya. Legislator of constituency has recently adopted the village under Saansad Adarsh Gram Yojana ( SAGY) to lift up the standard of physical and social life of people.

It has a population of about 3500 persons living in around 587 households according to 2001. It has many different cast people lives. It has Gurjars, Brahmans, Rajputs, Dholis, Jains, kumhars, Nayak, Dhobis, Bhils, Balais and some ragars, chamars, harijans.

== Geography ==
Motras is located at 25.73°N 74.33°E It has an average elevation of 467 metres (1532 feet). Motras is one of the villages in Asind Mandal in Bhilwara District in Rajasthan State. Motras is located 18.8 km from its Mandal Main Town Asind. Motras is 70 km from its District Main City Bhilwara and 39 km from Beawar. It is 181 km from its State Main City Jaipur. Nearby villages are Sangramgarh (2.6 km), Akarsada (4.3 km), Patan (4.5 km), Rampura (5.2 km), Ojiyana (6.1 km).

== Transport ==
Motras has poor road connectivity and still lacks public transport. However some of private buses and autos, etc. ply to connect the village and nearby towns like Asind, Ojiyana, Antali, and Ramgarh. Similarly one bus connects Beawar and Bhilwara regularly (one in the morning and one in the evening, arriving at 7 am and 7 pm respectively ) is the only fair and scheduled way of transport.
