= Gulabpura railway station =

Railway station in Rajasthan, India

Gulabpura

General information
- Location: Gulabpura, Bhilwara district, Rajasthan; India
- Coordinates: 25.902460°N 74.655504°E
- Elevation: 400 metres (1,300 ft)
- System: Indian Railways station
- Owner: Indian Railways
- Operator: North Western Railway
- Line: Ajmer–Ratlam line
- Platforms: 1
- Tracks: 1

Construction
- Structure type: Standard (on ground station)
- Parking: Yes

Other information
- Status: Functioning
- Station code: GBP
- Zone(s): North Western Railway
- Division(s): Ajmer
Location
- Location within India Location within Rajasthan

Gulabpura railway station is a railway station in Bhilwara district, Rajasthan. Its code is GBP. It serves Gulabpura town. The station consists of a single platform. Passenger, Superfast trains halt here.
