= Gadarmala =

- village
- Location in Rajasthan, India Gadarmala (India)
- Coordinates: 26°39′25″N 73°29′35″E
- Country: India
- State: Rajasthan
- District: Bhilwara

Languages
  - Official: Hindi
- Time zone: UTC+5:30 (IST)
- ISO 3166 code: RJ-IN

Gadarmala, also known as Bhopalgarh, is a taluk in Bhilwara district, Rajasthan, which is situated approximately 20 km away from Bhilwara. It is a small village with a population of about 5,000 people.

== History ==
The village is named after King Bhopal Singh, an adopted son of King Kesar Singh. The monument dedicated to the king has been purchased by a villager and is not accessible to tourists.

Gadarmala is a thikana (titled estate or jagir) held by the descendants of Puranmal, the eleventh son of Maharana Pratap Singh I (1572–1597), with the title of Baba. The ancestral seat, Mangrop (Magrop), bestowed upon Puranmal, has been the root of their lineage. Progressing two generations down the family line, Puranmal's grandson, Mohkam Singh, was granted the village of Gurla as a jagir by his father, Nath Singh of Mangrop. It was during this time that Mohkam Singh, in turn, allocated the jagir of Gadarmala to his son, Amar Singh, an offshoot with its roots tracing back to Gurla.

== Administration ==
Gadarmala has a gram panchayat consisting of small villages such as Chawanderi, Dholikhera, Nogawa.
