= Rampura Agucha =

Mine in India

- Location: Bhilwara district
- Products: Zinc, lead
- Type: Underground and open-pit mine
- Company: Hindustan Zinc Limited

Rampura Agucha is a zinc and lead mine located on a massive sulfide deposit in the Bhilwara district of Rajasthan, India. Rampura Agucha is located 220 km (140 mi) from Jaipur. It is north of Bhilwara, and northwest of Shahpura. Rampura Agucha is 10 km (6.2 mi) southeast of Gulabpura on NH 79. The mine is owned by Hindustan Zinc Limited (HZL), and has the world's largest deposits of zinc and lead.

== History ==
Rampura Agucha deposits were discovered in August 1977 by T. C. Rampuria, a geologist with the Government of India's Directorate of Mines and Geology. Hindustan Zinc Limited (HZL) started drilling in February 1980 and a report regarding the estimate of the deposit was submitted in 1981. The development of this mine started in 1988 and the first ore production was in March 1991. Rampura Agucha has a combination of open-pit mine and underground mine.

== Geology ==
Rampura Agucha is a zinc-lead sulfide deposit that is located in the Sikar belt which is part of the Aravalli-Delhi orogen. The Bhilwara belt is mostly metasedimentary, metamorphosed dolomite and a small amount of igneous rocks. The deposit was originally a sedimentary exhalative deposit before experiencing a metamorphic event. The high grade metamorphic event is theorized to have occurred approximately 1 billion years ago. There are a few sulphides and oxide minerals that form within the ore that are a particular interest, the major one being sphalerite. Galena, pyrite, pyrrhotite, and marcasite commonly occur with the sphalerite along with some minor arsenopyrite and chalcopyrite. Gahnite and rutile are the most common oxide minerals that form within the ore, with rutile being the most abundant. Graphite is also a mineral that is commonly found within the ore and surrounding rock.

== Processing ==
Extracted deposits through drilling, blasting, and underground mining methods are loaded and taken to be processed while leftovers of debris, rock, and other waste, are brought to specific areas for removal. The first step to processing is feeding the deposits through a ball mill to broken into smaller material. Further breakdown of the material is then completed through the use of a semi-autogenous grinding mill an additional three times before specifically targeting the extraction of the ore from the parent material. The processed material is separated to retrieve the lead and zinc concentrates through flotation methods. The different densities of the material allow for the retrieval of the two different metals separately. The lead and zinc concentrates are transported to the Chanderiya Smelter Complex to further refine the metals collected. The Rampura Agucha mine has an ore production capacity of 6.15 lakh tonnes per year and in 2017 it was reported that the mine produced 528,459 tonnes of lead and zinc.

=== Byproducts ===
The process of retrieving the ore from the parent material results in a heterogeneous slurry of materials, such as water, rock, and others, called tailings. Tailings have several different impacts on the environment due to the large amounts of sulfides contained in the waste. This waste is stored in an on-site dam structure after thickening to ensure no contamination to the surrounding environment occurs. The tailings are treated to neutralize the waste for reclamation purposes through the use of calcium hydroxide. This can allow for the potential use of using the water from tailings to be available for other uses in the mine. The Rampura Agucha mine produced 108,000 tonnes per month of tailings waste in the year 2008.

== Environmental effects ==
There are several different forms of air pollutants produced during the mining process, including suspended particulate matter and respirable suspended particulate matter. Preventive measures are taken to reduce these pollutants through practices such as using water to reduce dust accumulation during drilling and using several different forms of scrubbers along the mining and processing of the materials to prevent excess release of dust to surrounding areas.

The location of the mine has minimal surrounding water reserves for use in the mining process. All well water used is located at the Banas River bed 60 km (37 mi) away from the mine, which makes a pipeline required to obtain the necessary water for mining. Drains and a 50,000 cubic meter reservoir structure were implemented to collect any used run-off water during the mining process. Water is also retrieved from the tailings due to the extensive amount of water used during the processing of the extracted material. Retrieval of tailings water is achieved through flocculent additions in tailings thickeners to separate water from the waste material. The reclaimed water is then treated and used in all mining practices as a replacement for fresh water use when possible. Water conservation management of this extent resulted in a zero discharge status of contaminated water, which has reportedly resulted in no groundwater pollution in the surrounding mine site. The input of these practices has also shown a decrease in freshwater usage for the mine from 1.36 cubic meters per tonne of metal in 2003 to only 0.66 cubic meters per tonne in 2006.

== Recovery of metals ==
Efforts have also been made to retrieve low grade zinc and lead found in tailings through bioleaching. Minimal results have been shown through this method. Although, HZL research teams have been attempting to retrieve zinc from these tailings through microwave irradiation. It was concluded that this method showed a greater than 90% extraction of zinc found in tailings. This is a much higher recovery of zinc compared to more traditional methods such as bioleaching and conventional heating. This also provides a viable economic retrieval method to be used for the Rampura Agucha mines tailings for zinc.
