= Hamirgarh railway station =

Railway station in Rajasthan, India

Hamirgarh

General information
- Location: Hamirgarh, Bhilwara district, Rajasthan; India
- Coordinates: 25.187229°N 74.617475°E
- Elevation: 416 metres (1,365 ft)
- System: Indian Railways station
- Owner: Indian Railways
- Operator: North Western Railway
- Line: Ajmer–Ratlam line
- Platforms: 2
- Tracks: 2

Construction
- Structure type: Standard (on ground station)
- Parking: Yes

Other information
- Status: Functioning
- Station code: HMG
- Zone(s): North Western Railway
- Division(s): Ajmer
Location
- Location within India Location within Rajasthan

Hamirgarh railway station is a railway station in Bhilwara district, Rajasthan. Its code is HMG. It serves Hamirgarh town. The station consists of 2 platforms. Passenger, Express trains halt here.
