= Gosunda Dam =

Dam in India

- Location of the dam within the state of Rajasthan Gosunda Dam (India)
- Official name: Gosunda Dam
- Location: made on ayad/bedach river {appavas hamletChittorgarh, Rajasthan
- Coordinates: 24.8265081°N 74.5230639°E
- Operator: Hindustan Zinc Limited

Dam and spillways
- Height: 23
- Length: 639.5

Gosunda Dam is an artificial reservoir about 10 kilometres from Chittorgarh
