= Mod Ka Nimbahera =

Village in Bhilwara district, Rajasthan, India

Mod Ka Nimbahera is a village in Bhilwara district, Rajasthan, India.
