= Bhilwara EMU factory =

Bhilwara MEMU coach factory
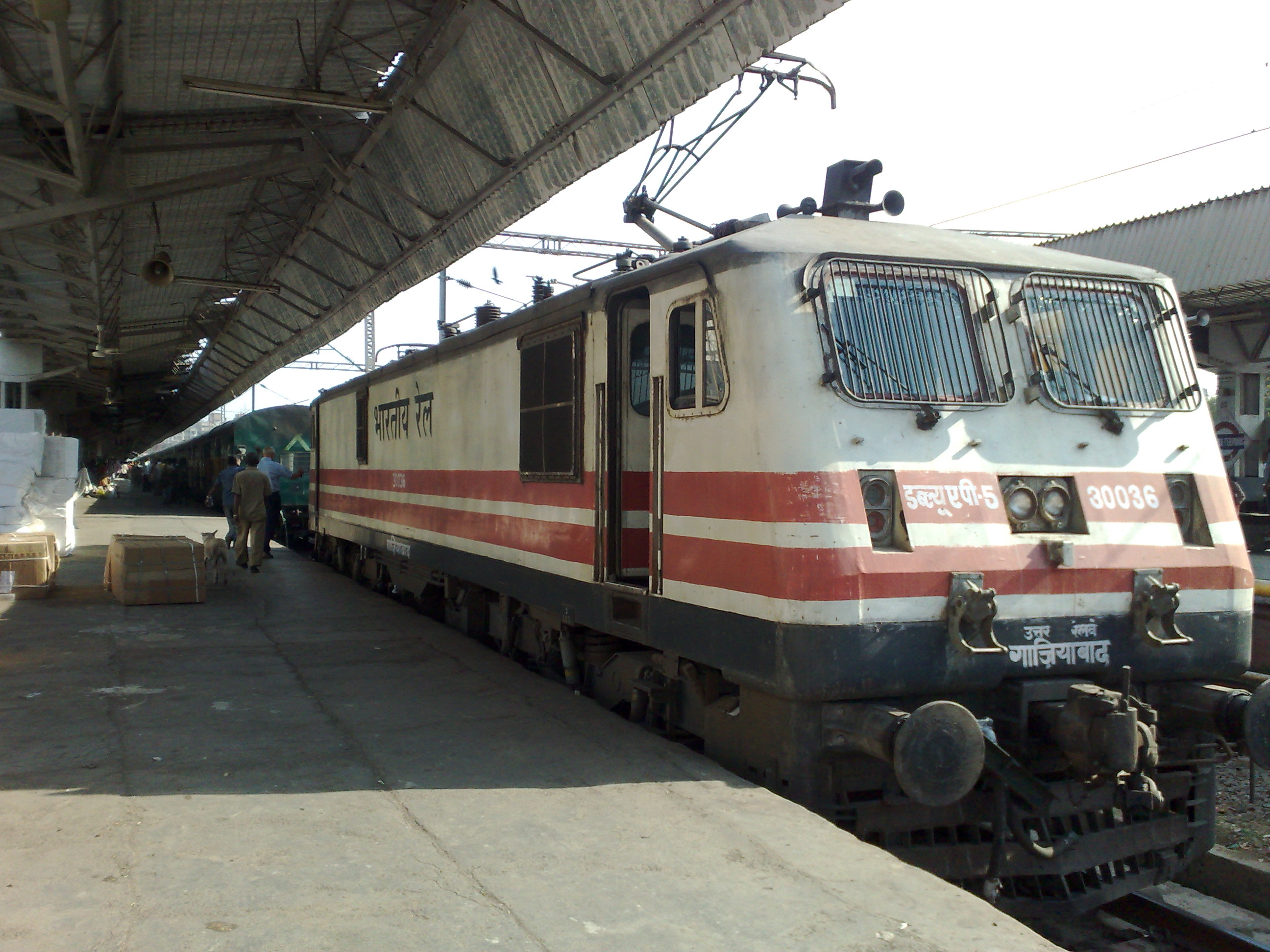
- Built: Scrapped
- Location: A
- Industry: Railways
- Products: Mainline Electric multiple unit coaches
- Style: M.M.H.I
- Area: 518 acres (210 ha)

Bhilwara MEMU coach factory was a planned factory in Bhilwara, Rajasthan, India. Construction of the factory has been scrapped as project not viable.
