= Amargarh Fort =

Fort in Rajasthan

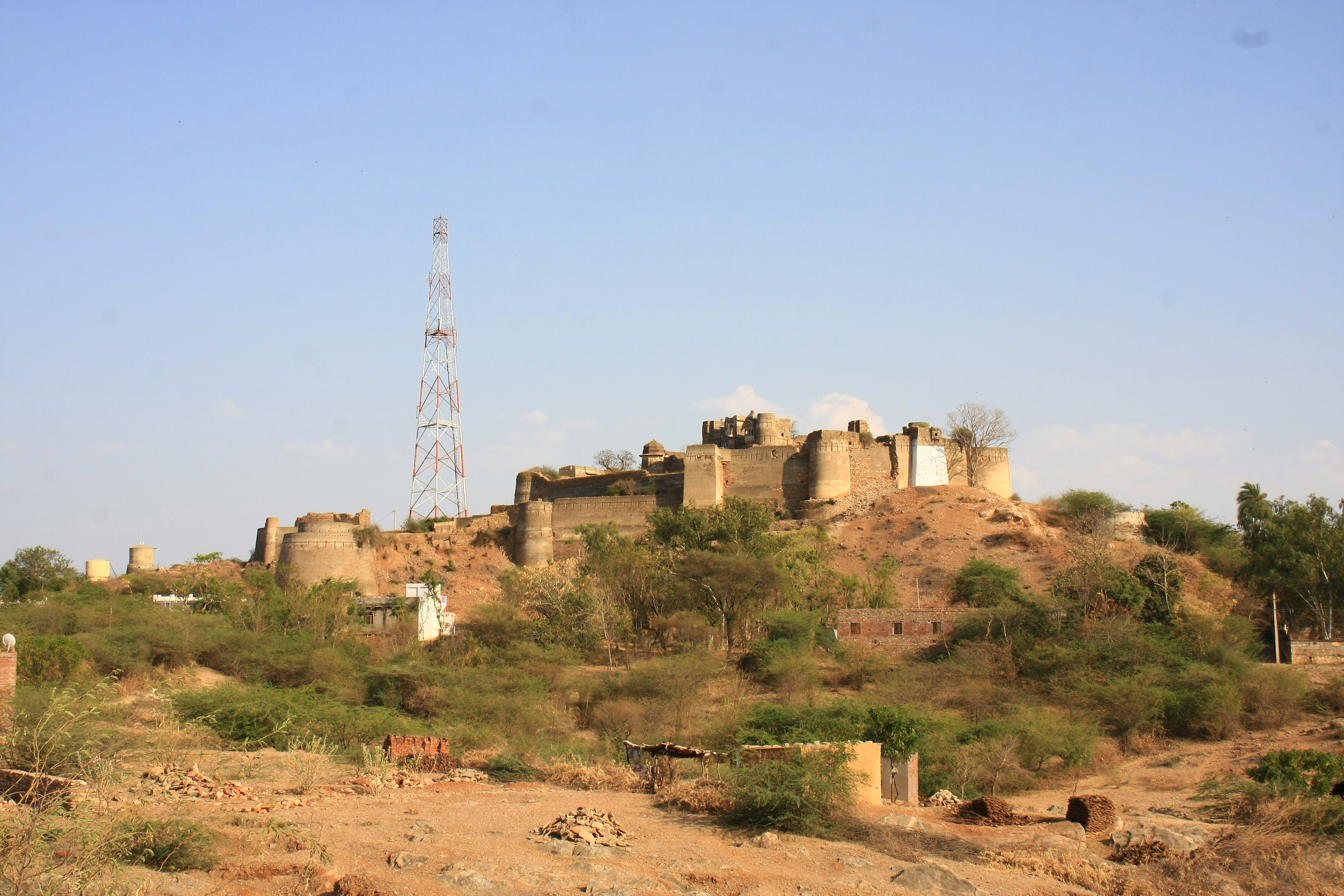
- Interactive map of Amargarh Fort
- Location: Amargarh, Rajasthan, India
- Coordinates: 25.4411769°N 75.1848152°E
- Type: Fort

The Amargarh Fort is a fort in Rajasthan, India. It is located in Amargarh village near Jahazpur, Bhilwara district. It is often overshadowded by other Rajasthani forts like Amber or Mehrangarh, but it holds cultural and historical significance, especially for the Meena community and Jadon Rajputs. The fort was probably built around 1745 AD by Raja Amar Mal ji, a key figure in the Jadon Rajput clan, who claimed descent from Lord Krishna as Chandravanshi (moon descendants). The fort was later converted into a heritage hotel.

== History ==
=== Early history ===
The Amargarh fort’s origins are debated. According to some sources, Raja Amar Mal ji constructed Amargarh Fort around 280 years ago, in 1740s, as a Thikana (feudal estate) for the Jadon Rajputs, who held high positions in the Karauli royal court. The Jadons, a Chandravanshi clan, trace their lineage to Lord Krishna, adding a mythological layer to the fort’s history. The fort was designed for relaxation in an eco-friendly setting, reflecting Rajput aesthetics. However, the Meena community, a Scheduled Tribe in Rajasthan, claims the fort was built by a Meena Sardar from the Nadla gotra (now Badgoti Meenas) before Rajput rule. Meena tradition holds that they ruled eastern Rajasthan, called “mind-esh” (country of the Meenas), until around 1100 AD when Rajput clans, like the Kachhwaha, took over.

=== 18th-Century Reconstruction ===
In the 18th century, Sawai Jai Singh, founder of Jaipur, reportedly gave the fort its current form. Sawai Jai Singh II, a Kachhwaha Rajput, was a warrior and astronomer who built Jantar Mantar observatories across India. Historians like Rima Hooja suggest there was earlier construction at the site, supporting Meena claims of pre-Rajput origins.

Sl No.	Time Period	Key Event
1	Pre-1100 AD	Meena rule in eastern Rajasthan; possible fort construction by Meena Sardar
2	~1740s	Raja Amar Mal ji builds or expands fort as Jadon Thikana
3	18th Century	Maharaja Sawai Jai Singh II reconstructs fort

== Significance ==
For centuries, Amargarh Fort has been a holy site for the Meena community, who worshiped deities like Amba Mata, Bhairu ji, and Shiv Parivar inside the fort. The Meenas, also known as Meos or Mewati, are a Scheduled Tribe with significant political influence in Rajasthan, holding most of the 25 reserved Assembly seats for STs. Their claim that the fort predates Rajput rule underscores its deep cultural roots.

In August 2024, the 600 years old priceless idol of Lord Jagmohan was stolen from Amargarh Fort. The thieves uprooted the three-foot idol of the Bhagwan which was made of sapphire.

== Architecture ==
The Architecture of fort is not well documented, but it’s described as reflecting Rajput aesthetics, with designs meant for relaxation in an eco-friendly setting. It stands atop a hill, surrounded by paddy fields, forests, and mountains. Unlike grand forts like Amber, Amargarh is likely smaller and more intimate, fitting its role as a Thikana.

Thakur Sahib Ashok Singh ji converted Amargarh Fort into a heritage hotel, preserving its Rajput architectural and cultural values.

== Controversy ==
In June 2021, Amargarh Fort in Jaipur became a centre of controversy when idols in its Amba Mata temple, sacred to the Meena community, were reportedly vandalized, and a saffron flag with “Jai Shri Ram” was hoisted in the premises. The Meenas, who claim the fort as a holy site built by a Meena Sardar before Rajput rule, accused Hindu groups, including the Vishva Hindu Parishad and Rashtriya Swayamsevak Sangh, of trying to destroy their culture by renaming Amba Mata as Ambika Bhawani, a deity they say is distinct. On 21 July 2021, the flag was taken down in the presence of Independent MLA Ramkesh Meena, but it tore during removal, sparking outrage after a video went viral, with Hindu groups alleging deliberate disrespect. The Meenas claimed the tear was accidental, saying Hindu groups agreed to remove the flag after talks. Both sides filed cases against each other for defiling a place of worship, escalating tensions with social media campaigns and calls to gather at the fort, which police restricted as it’s Forest Department land.
