= Titoda Mafi =

Village in Rajasthan, India

Titoda Mafi is a village situated in Bhilwara district near Sawar/Pander in Rajasthan.
