= Gangapur Rajasthan =

Gangapur may refer to two places in Rajasthan.

- Gangapur City
- Gangapur, Bhilwara
