= Manikya Lal Verma Textile and Engineering College =

Indian college

Coordinates: 25.338751°N 74.615707°E

Mankiya Lal Verma Govt.Textile and Engineering College
- Type: Public
- Established: 1988
- Principal: Dr. Dhirendra sharma
- Undergraduates: 1500
- Location: Bhilwara, Rajasthan, India
- Campus: Urban
- Website: www.mlvti.ac.in/index.php

Manikya Lal Verma Govt. Textile and Engineering College (previously known as Manikya Lal Verma Textile Institute or MLVTI) is an autonomous engineering institute of the government of Rajasthan managed by Manikya Lal Verma Textile Institute society in Bhilwara, Rajasthan, India.

== History ==
Originally, MLVTEC was a polytechnic college as the joint venture of the government of Rajasthan and the Bhilwara group of industries (now known as the LNJ Bhilwara group). It was upgraded to a full engineering institute in 1988. The goal of the institute was to produce textile technocrats to fulfill the industrial demand of Bhilwara. In 1994, the college added the Textile Chemistry discipline. Currently, the institute is producing 200 textile engineers per class year.

In 2001, the college added an engineering degree in Information Technology. It added an Electronics and Communication Engineering degree in 2003. The expansion in IT-related fields was due to added focus on these subject areas from the government. Additionally, expansion allowed the physical resources of the college to be better used.

Further continuing the expansion mode two new engineering degrees, Textile Engineering in 2006 and Mechanical Engineering in 2007, were added by the college.

The college has fully fledged Wi-Fi campus. Apart from that college provides industrial tours, seminars from dignitaries. The college has separate hostel for both boys and girls. The college celebrated its silver jubilee on 15 November 2014 in a gala manner.

== Industrial services ==
The institute provides services for the industry, including:

- Consultancy services to solve technical problems.
- Commercial testing of textile materials like fibers, yarns, fabrics, dyes and chemicals, etc.
- Project preparation and appraisal.
- Computer equipment services like computer aided designing (CAD), computer color matching (CCM), etc.
- Organizing short-term courses.
- Preparation of yarn and fabric samples, etc.
- Production on various machines.
- In plant training program for managerial staff supervisor and workers.
