= Badri Lal Chitrakar =

Indian painter

Badri Lal Chitrakar (February 1920 – 2018) was an Indian traditional painter and dealer in antiquities. He was presented with the National Award in 1987, and the Shilp Guru award on 9 September 2006. He lived and worked for most of his life in Bhilwara, a town in Rajasthan.

== Life and career ==
He was born in February 1920 and was an acclaimed master in Indian traditional paintings. He has guided a number of students nationally and internationally.

He was also a dealer in Indian antiquities, and was known for his mastery in restoration of paintings. One of his works includes a portrait of Maharana Bhupal Singh of Mewar, made on an ivory slab, for which he was honoured with the National Award by Ministry of Textiles, by the Government of India in 1987. Another includes the thousand drawings of Lord Ganesha, where each Ganesha conveys the meaning and mood of a thousand different Ganesha names, as mentioned in old Indian scriptures. His works are housed in a number of museums and private art collections across the world.

Chitrakar was credited with keeping traditional Indian art schools alive through his successors and students. He experimented with different materials, techniques of Indian art, and had an expertise in preparing pigments. He died in 2018.

== Awards ==
He has been conferred the following awards:

- Shilp Guru Award – nominated, 2004 / winner, 2006
- National Award of Master craftsperson – 1987
- Pune Festival Award
