= Chanderiya Smelter Complex =

Lead-zinc smelter complex in India

Chanderiya Smelter Complex is the world's largest lead-zinc smelter complex in the Chittorgarh district of Rajasthan state of India. It is metallurgical type plant. The original complex was built from 1989 and commissioned in 1991.

It refines lead-zinc ore from Rampura Agucha. It produces zinc, lead, cadmium and other precious metals.
