= Gulabpura =

- Town
- Location in Rajasthan, India Gulabpura (India)
- Coordinates: 25.90630°N 74.658000°E
- Country: India
- State: Rajasthan
- District: Bhilwara
- Named for: Gulab Baba

Government
  - Type: Municipality
  - Chairman: Sumit Kalya (INC)
  - Vice Chairman: Sanwar Nath Yogi (BJP)
- Elevation: 397 m (1,302 ft)

Population (2020)
  - Total: 3 7,315

Languages
  - Official: Hindi
- Time zone: UTC+5:30 (IST)
- PIN: 311021

Gulabpura is a town in Bhilwara district of Rajasthan. Mainly industrial town with good educational institutes.

The town gets its name from a religious preacher by the name Gulab Baba who practiced meditation in that area more than 100 years ago. A festival is held every year in the town to commemorate the saint. Very peaceful town with good educational institutions like vkv hurda (cbse), navodaya vidyalaya (cbse), zinc vidyalaya (cbse), saint paul (cbse), gandhi vidhyalaya (Rbse). Shri pragya public school.

A major market is situated in centre of town. Also hospital and medical facilities in Gulabpura are much better in nearby area.

== Geography ==
Gulabpura is located at 25.902879°N 74.660726°E.

== Demographics ==
As of 2011 India census, Gulabpura had a population of 37,215.

== Major companies ==
- DEV INDUSTRY (CHIRANJEEVI METAL ROFFING SHEET) LAMBA ROAD GULABPURA 9950220245
- Mayur suitings (Rswm)
- Cooperative mill (Spinfed)(CLOSED)
- Wearit global( CLOSED )
- Saras Dairy Plant ( On the place of Wearit Global )
- Hzl (Hindustan zinc)
- Isuzu Garments ( CLOSED )
- Krishna Minerals
- Memu coach factory (proposed).
- Textile park ( on memu coach land)

== Main attractions ==
- DEV INDUSTRY (CHIRANJEEVI METAL ROFFING SHEET) LAMBA ROAD GULABPURA
- Ram Mandir
- Gulab Baba temple
- Mayur mill
- HZL
- Khari Nadi
- Dussehra Celebrations
- Pragya Mirgi Rog Niwarak Hospital
- Swadyay Sangh Gulabpura

== Getting there ==
By air

The nearest airport is Kishangarh International Airport, Kishangarh, Ajmer which is about 80 km. away from Gulabpura. Others include Dabok (Udaipur) and Sanganer (Jaipur) which are about 200 and 190 km. respectively (Both the airports are an International airport).

By road

Direct buses from: RSRTC Delhi, Jaipur, Udaipur, Bhilwara, Mumbai, Chittorgarh, Haridwar, Ajmer etc. (Nearest National Highway is NH No.79. which is about 2 km. away from Gulabpura)

Auto stand is present on highway crossing from where you can hire auto to go anywhere in Gulabpura, Hurda, zinc etc.

By train

Nearest railway station is Bhilwara, Ajmer, Bijainagar, Gulabpura, Jaipur
