= Hindustan Zinc =

Indian mining and resources company pvt ltd

Hindustan Zinc Limited
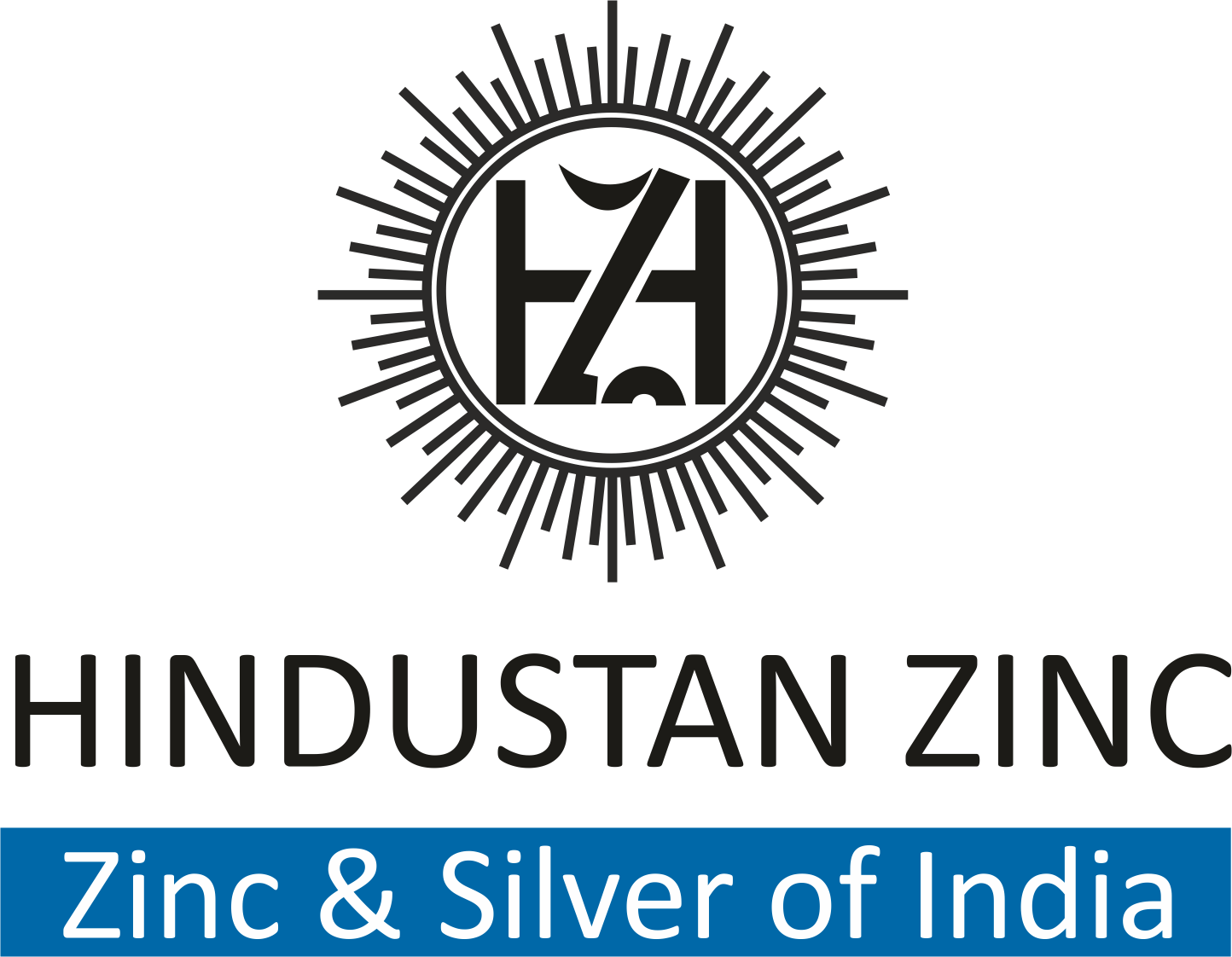
- Type: Public
- Traded as: NSE: HINDZINC; BSE: 500188
- Industry: Mining; Milling; Smelting
- Founded: 1966; 60 years ago
- Headquarters: Udaipur, Rajasthan, India
- Area served: India
- Key people: Priya Agarwal (chairman); Amarendu Prakash (CEO)
- Products: Zinc; Lead; Silver; Cadmium
- Revenue: ▲₹34,083 crore (US$3.5 billion) (2025)
- Operating income: ▲₹17,465 crore (US$1.8 billion) (2025)
- Net income: ▲₹10,353 crore (US$1.1 billion) (2025)
- Total assets: ▲₹34,490 crore (US$3.6 billion) (2025)
- Total equity: ▼₹13,326 crore (US$1.4 billion) (2025)
- Number of employees: 25,531 (including Contractuals) (2025)
- Parent: Vedanta Limited (64.92%); Government of India (35.08%)
- Website: hzlindia.com

Hindustan Zinc Limited (HZL) is an Indian integrated mining and resources producer of zinc, lead, silver and cadmium. It is a subsidiary of Vedanta Limited. Earlier it was a Central Public Sector Undertaking, sold by Government of India to Vedanta Limited when Atal Bihari Vajpayee and Bharatiya Janta Party Government was in power in the year 2003. HZL is the world's second largest zinc producer.

== History ==
Hindustan Zinc Limited was incorporated from the erstwhile Metal Corporation of India on 10 January 1966 as a Public Sector Undertaking (PSU).

In 2001, as part of the Government of India's disinvestment program of loss-making PSUs, the company was put up for sale.

In April 2002, Sterlite Opportunities and Ventures Limited (SOVL) made an open offer for acquisition of shares of the company; consequent to the disinvestment of Government of India's (GOI) stake of 26% including management control to SOVL and acquired additional 20% of shares from public, pursuant to the SEBI Regulations 1997. In August 2003, SOVL acquired additional shares to the extent of 18.92% of the paid up capital from GOI in exercise of call option clause in the share holder's agreement between GOI and SOVL.

With the above additional acquisition, SOVL's stake in the company went up to 64.92%. Thus GOI's stake in the company now stands at 29.54%. SOVL was merged with Sterlite Industries India Ltd in April 2011.

Sterlite Industries merged with Sesa Goa Ltd to form Sesa Sterlite Limited in August 2013. Sesa Sterlite was renamed to Vedanta Limited in April 2015. Hindustan Zinc is a direct subsidiary of Vedanta Limited.

== Operations ==
=== Mining ===
HZL operates the world's third largest open-pit mine, and the world's largest zinc mine in Rampura Agucha, Rajasthan. Other mines owned by HZL are located in Rajpura and Dariba, Sindesar Khurd, Kayad and Zawar, all in Rajasthan.

=== Smelting ===
HZL operates Zinc and Lead smelters and refineries at Chanderiya (Chittorgarh), Debari (Udaipur) & Dariba (Rajsamand) in Rajasthan with total zinc and lead production capacity of 10 lakh tonnes. A smelting facility was established at Pantnagar in Uttarakhand. It was initially intended to serve as a smelting facility for Silver production, but later Zinc and Lead melting and casting plants were also established here. The total metal production was 8,80,000 tonnes for year 2014–2015. It also has zinc smelter in Visakhapatnam, Andhra Pradesh, where operations have been suspended since February 2012.

=== Sports ===
Zinc Football Academy is an Indian professional football academy club based in Zawar a mining town in Udaipur, Rajasthan. The club competes in R-League A Division, the top-tier league of the state. The club is owned by Hindustan Zinc Limited Group. Zinc FA is the current champions of R-League Season.
