= Ambamata Temple =

- Location in Udaipur

Religion
- Affiliation: Hinduism
- District: Udaipur district

Location
- Location: Udaipur
- State: Rajasthan
- Country: India
- Coordinates: 24°35′07″N 73°40′41″E

Architecture
- Completed: Samvat 1721

Ambamata Temple, a large Hindu temple in the middle of Udaipur in Rajasthan, is considered one of the major places of worship in Udaipur. This temple was constructed by Maharana Raj Singh of Udaipur. It is assumed that he built this temple on the instructions of the goddess Amba Mata in Gujarat.

== General ==
Ambamata Temple is constructed on a 20-foot (6.1 m) high platform enclosed within a tall compound wall. Inside the main compound wall, there is a courtyard and a Charan Paduka platform. There are around eight steps in front, leading to the temple. Above the main gate of the compound wall is "nakkar khana" with Gold Lion statues on either side. On the west side of the Nakkarkhana is the east-facing main temple. The temple is made of white stone.

== History ==
It is believed that Maharana Raj Singh (1652–1680) suffered from severe eye trouble, and even efforts made by Raj Vaidya could not cure him. He was then advised to visit the Ambika Mata temple in the Arbudancha hills of Gujarat. But before starting the journey, the Maharana saw the Goddess in his dream and was told that he need not make the journey as the Goddess herself was coming to Mewar. Based on the instructions provided in dreams, the Maharana and his courtiers started digging at a place where they found an idol of goddess Ambamata. Immediately on the extraction of the idol from the ground, Maharana was also fully cured from his ailment. Maharana started construction of a temple at the same location. The temple was completed in Vikram Samvat 1721(1664 AD).

== Access ==
The Ambamata Temple is located on the Ambamata Temple Road, near Fateh Sagar Lake, around 3 km from the city center and 5 km from Udaipur City railway station.
