= Moil Castle, Argyll and Bute =

Moil Castle
- near Campbeltown, Kintyre, Scotland

Location
- Coordinates: 55.4299°N 5.5973°W

Moil Castle was a castle near Campbeltown, Kintyre, Scotland. It was a stronghold of Clan Donald.
