= Ojhiyana archaeological site =

Archaeological site

Ojhiyana Archaeological Site
- 25.878651°N 74.357570°E
- Type: Chalcolithic archaeological site
- Location: Beawar district, Rajasthan, India

Site notes
- Excavation dates: 1999-2000, 2000-01

The Ojhiyana archaeological site in Bhilwara वर्तमान नए जिले के अनुसार ब्याबर district, previously excavated in 1999-2000, revealed remains of Chalcolithic cultures. The 2000-01 excavation yielded white painted black and red wares, terracotta bulls, cow figurines, copper tools, and various beads, dating from the 3rd to 2nd millennium B.C.

== Excavations ==
The Jaipur Circle of the Survey, led by B.R. Meena and Alok Tripathi, conducted excavations at Ojiyana, 30 km southwest of Beawar in the hilly region of District beawar. The site's unique hill slope location distinguishes it from other Ahar culture sites in Ahar river valleys.

=== Excavation details ===
The site revealed a single-culture deposit with a thickness of about 7.5 m, divided into three phases based on pottery and structural evidence. Initial settlers used sun-dried mud-bricks for houses on the natural rock. In Phase II, locally available stones were used for construction, marking a shift. Phase III showed a decline with evidence of a devastating fire.

=== Cultural continuity ===
Despite changes, the excavation displayed cultural continuity from the 3rd millennium B.C. to mid-2nd millennium B.C., indicating permanent settlement, growth, development, and decline, alongside the assimilation of new ideas.

=== Antiquities ===
Unique findings include terracotta bulls, white-painted and stylized, termed "Ojiyana bulls," possibly used in ceremonies. Terracotta cow figurines, a copper chopper, Harappan-type faïence, and various beads were discovered. Ornaments included copper and shell bangles, copper rings, and pendants. Agricultural tools like saddle-querns and hammer-stones were also unearthed.
