= Hurda, Rõuge Parish =

Village in Estonia

Hurda
- Location within Estonia
- Coordinates: 57°42′45″N 26°50′31″E
- Country: Estonia
- County: Võru County
- Time zone: UTC+2 (EET)

Hurda is a settlement in Rõuge Parish, Võru County in southeastern Estonia.
