= MOIL =

Indian mining company

Manganese Ore (India) Limited
- Company type: Public Sector Undertaking
- Traded as: BSE: 533286; NSE: MOIL
- Industry: Manganese ore
- Founded: 22 June 1962
- Headquarters: Nagpur, India
- Area served: India
- Key people: Ajit Kumar Saxena (Chairman & MD)
- Production output: 1,756,000 tonnes (1,935,659 tons)
- Total assets: ▲₹37,560 million (US$390 million) (2015-16)
- Website: moil.nic.in

MOIL (earlier known as Manganese Ore (India) Limited) is a miniratna government manganese ore mining company headquartered in Nagpur, India. With a market share of 50%, it is the largest producer of manganese ore in India. MOIL operates 11 mines in adjoining districts of Maharashtra and Madhya Pradesh. It has been ranked #486 among the 500 top companies in India and 9th in the mines and metals sector of the Fortune India 500 list for 2011.

In December 2010, the Government of India divested about 20% of its equity through an IPO. Of the 20%, the Indian Government divested 10%, and the Government of Maharashtra and the Government of Madhya Pradesh each divested 5% of the total equity. The central government holds 54% and the two state governments hold about 11% shares in MOIL. and the public holds about 35% shares.

== History ==
MOIL was originally set up as "Central Province Prospecting Syndicate" in the year 1896 in the region of Maharashtra and Madhya Pradesh. It was later renamed as "Central Provinces Manganese Ore Company Limited (CPMO)" in 1935. In 1962, the Government of India took over the mining activities from CPMO. Then, Manganese Ore (India) Limited was formed with 51% stake held between the Government of India and the Maharashtra and Madhya Pradesh State governments. The other 49% was retained with CPMO. In 1977, the balance of 49% was acquired from CPMO, and MOIL became a 100% state-owned enterprise.

== Mines ==
Eight of MOIL's eleven mines are underground mines (Kandri, Munsar, Beldongri, Gumgaon, Chikla, Balaghat, and Ukwa mines) and three are opencast mines (Dongri Buzurg, Sitapatore, and Tirodi). Its Balaghat mine is the largest of the 11 mines and the deepest at 383 metres.

== See also ==
- Fortune India 500
- List of companies of India
