= Hamirgarh =

- City
- Location in Rajasthan, India Hamirgarh (India)
- Coordinates: 25.188°N 74.627°E
- Country: India
- State: Rajasthan
- District: Bhilwara
- Elevation: 334 m (1,096 ft)

Population (2001)
  - Total: 18,816

Languages
  - Official: Hindi, English, Kheradi
- Time zone: UTC+5:30 (IST)

Hamirgarh is a town and tehsil headquarters in the Bhilwara district of Rajasthan. It is historical town and well known for textile industries. Legend has it that its old name was Bankrola and changed into current name after Rana Hamir singh of Mewar Kingdom. He built a fort in Hamirgarh. The town is 19 kilometers away from district headquarters Bhilwara.

It has one air strip situated in nearby Takhtpura village on Chittorgarh-Bhilwara district border, which was established by the former chief minister of Rajasthan, Shiv Charan Mathur. The town is situated at the base of outcrops of Aravali mountain chain. There is a temple of Hindu goddess Mahishasur Mardini Mata atop hill.

The town was a feudatory, containing 12 villages, of Mewar Kings before independence. The villages constituted the feudatory were Aujyada, Takhtpura, Kherabad, Bardod, Amli, Kabra, Shadiganj and some other small villages to name.

The population of the town has drastically increased in the last decade due to rapid textile industrialisation.

== Places to visit ==
- Hamirgarh Eco-Park: This Eco-park is situated at Hills of Hamirgarh far 20 km from Bhilwara. The park is famous for sun-set point. You can see Blue Bulls, Jackles, Foxes, Vultures and many other wild animals. The "Mansha Mahadev" famous Shiv Temple is situated here.
- Chamunda mata Temple: Chamunda mata Temple also known as Mahishasur Mardini Mata Temple is situated on a hill in Hamirgarh. this temple was built by Rana Sanga in 1527 before starting of battle of khanwa.
- Sadar bazar: also known as Juna bazaar and zinda bazaar' is the main and only market in hamirgarh and known for Hand block printing and bandhej.
