= Gangapur, Bhilwara =

Gangapur Lalpura
- Municipality
- Location in Bhilwara District, Rajasthan, India Gangapur (India)
- Coordinates: 25.22°N 74.27°E
- Country: India
- State: Rajasthan
- District: Bhilwara
- Named for: Ganga Bai Sahiba

Government
  - Type: NAGAR PALIKA GANGAPUR
- Elevation: 495 m (1,624 ft)

Population (2011)
  - Total: 18,777

Languages HINDI MEWARI & ENGLISH
  - Official: Mewari, Hindi
- Time zone: UTC+5:30 (IST)
- Postal code: 311801
- Vehicle registration: RJ-06Bhilwara

Gangapur is a city and a municipality in Bhilwara district in the state of Rajasthan, India.

== Geography ==
Gangapur is located at 25.22°N 74.27°E. It has an average elevation of 495 metres (1624 feet).

== History ==
According to historical evidence, an ancient name of Gangapur was Lalpura, Gangapur is named after the death of Maharani Ganga Bai Scindia. It is host to the "Temple of Maharani Ganga Bai Sahib."

== Demographics ==
According to India's 2001 census, Gangapur had a population of 18777. Males constitute 52% of the population and females 48%. Gangapur has an average literacy rate of 59%, lower than the national average of 59.5%: male literacy is 73%, and female literacy is 45%. In Gangapur, 16% of the population is under 6 years of age.

The most commonly spoken language of Gangapur is Mewari.
