= Bhilwara =

Bhilwara Textile city
- City
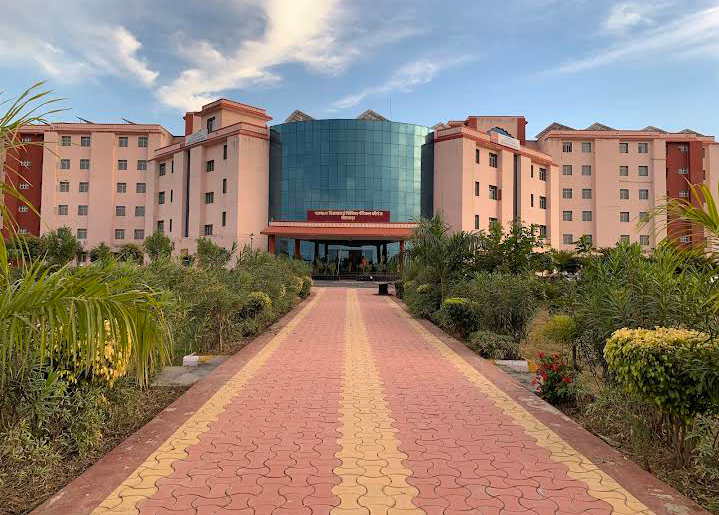
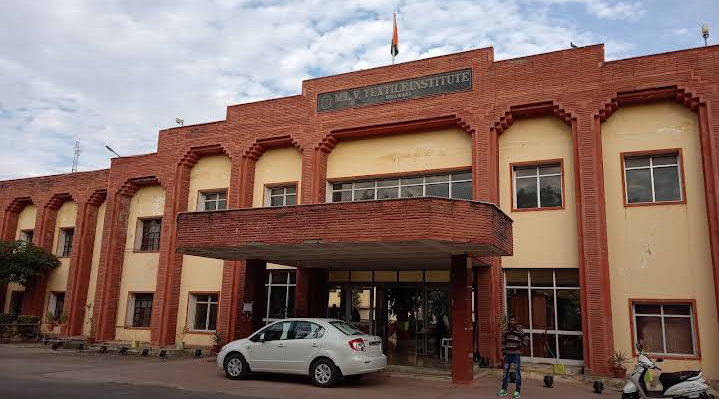
- Rajmata Vijaya Raje Scindia Medical College, Bhilwara MLV Textile and Engineering College, Bhilwara
- Nicknames: Textile City of Rajasthan, Manchester of Rajasthan
- Location in Rajasthan, India Bhilwara (India)
- Coordinates: 25.35°N 74.63°E
- Country: India
- State: Rajasthan
- District: Bhilwara
- Founder: King Bhalraaj Bhil

Government
  - Type: Mayor
  - Body: Bhilwara Municipal Corporation
  - Mayor: Jaswant Kanwar BJP

Area
  - Total: 73 km^{2} (28 sq mi)
- Elevation: 421 m (1,381 ft)

Population (2024)
  - Total: 709,483
  - Density: 9,700/km^{2} (25,000/sq mi)

Languages
  - Official: Hindi, Rajasthani
  - Regional: Mewari
- Time zone: UTC+5:30 (IST)
- PIN: 311001
- ISO 3166 code: RJ-IN
- Vehicle registration: RJ-06
- Sex ratio: 1000/973 ♂/♀
- Website: bhilwara.rajasthan.gov.in

Bhilwara (/biːlˈvɑːrə/) is a city Municipal Corporation and administrative headquarters in Bhilwara district of the Mewar region of Rajasthan, India. It has been termed as 'Textile city'.

== History ==
Stone Age tools dating from 5,012 to 200,000 years were found in Bundi and Bhilwara districts of the state.

According to substantiation, the present Bhilwara city had a mint where coins known as 'Bhiladi' were minted and from this denomination was derived the name of the district. And another tall story goes like this the original Adivasi tribe known as Bheel helped Maharana Pratap in the war against Mughal Empire king Akbar lived in Bhilwara region that's this area came to be known as Bheel+Bada (Bheel's area) Bhilwara. Over the years it has emerged as one of the major cities of Rajasthan. Nowadays, Bhilwara is better known as the textile city in the country.

The oldest part of this town dates back to the middle of the 11th century by building a Krishna Radha mandir (temple) that still exists and is known as the Bada Mandir. The area that is now known as old [purana] Bhilwara (Patwari Mohalla, Junawas, Manikya Nagar Malikhera). There is also a mythological reference to Arjuna having fought here during the Mahabharata period.

Historical records show that a town named Mandal close to Bhilwara served as the military camp for the Mughals when they conquered Chittaurgarh. The ruins of their campsite can still be seen today. A watch tower that was built on a small mound in Mandal is now a Devi temple.

== Geography ==
Bhilwara is located at 25.359854°N 74.652791°E. It has an average elevation of 421 metres (1381 feet). It falls between the districts of Ajmer (in the north) and Chittorgarh and Udaipur (in the south). Major rivers flowing through the district are Banas, Bedach, Kothari, Khari, Mansi, Menali, Chandrabhaga, and Nagdi.

There is no natural lake in the district but there are a number of ponds and dams, so the district is the most irrigated in the state of Rajasthan. It has a small man-made pond called Mansarovar Jheel (Pond) near Azad Nagar which is a famous attraction and gets crowded on weekends.

=== Climate ===
Climate data for Bhilwara (1991–2020, extremes 1962–present)
Month	Jan	Feb	Mar	Apr	May	Jun	Jul	Aug	Sep	Oct	Nov	Dec	Year
Record high °C (°F)	32.0 (89.6)	36.7 (98.1)	41.2 (106.2)	44.8 (112.6)	47.8 (118.0)	47.0 (116.6)	42.5 (108.5)	39.2 (102.6)	40.5 (104.9)	41.5 (106.7)	36.0 (96.8)	33.3 (91.9)	47.8 (118.0)
Mean daily maximum °C (°F)	23.8 (74.8)	27.5 (81.5)	33.2 (91.8)	38.2 (100.8)	41.5 (106.7)	40.3 (104.5)	34.0 (93.2)	31.2 (88.2)	32.4 (90.3)	34.3 (93.7)	30.4 (86.7)	25.4 (77.7)	32.7 (90.9)
Mean daily minimum °C (°F)	6.9 (44.4)	9.1 (48.4)	15.6 (60.1)	20.6 (69.1)	25.3 (77.5)	26.1 (79.0)	24.1 (75.4)	22.8 (73.0)	21.9 (71.4)	18.2 (64.8)	12.3 (54.1)	8.2 (46.8)	17.4 (63.3)
Record low °C (°F)	−0.3 (31.5)	1.7 (35.1)	6.3 (43.3)	11.8 (53.2)	16.9 (62.4)	16.5 (61.7)	15.0 (59.0)	16.0 (60.8)	15.5 (59.9)	10.0 (50.0)	5.0 (41.0)	−1.0 (30.2)	−1.0 (30.2)
Average rainfall mm (inches)	6.4 (0.25)	1.2 (0.05)	2.0 (0.08)	6.1 (0.24)	4.4 (0.17)	50.4 (1.98)	205.1 (8.07)	199.2 (7.84)	82.6 (3.25)	3.7 (0.15)	1.3 (0.05)	2.2 (0.09)	564.5 (22.22)
Average rainy days	0.5	0.1	0.2	0.5	0.6	3.1	7.2	8.1	4.4	0.2	0.2	0.2	25.4
Average relative humidity (%) (at 17:30 IST)	39	28	28	19	21	38	62	69	55	36	39	40	42
Source: India Meteorological Department all-time extreme temperature

== Demographics ==
Historical population
Year	Pop.	±%
1941	10,300	—
1951	29,700	+188.3%
1961	43,500	+46.5%
1971	82,100	+88.7%
1981	122,300	+49.0%
1991	184,000	+50.4%
2001	280,128	+52.2%
2011	359,483	+28.3%

Religion in Bhilwara City (2011)
Religion	Percent
Hinduism	79.50%
Islam	14.23%
Jainism	5.47%
Other or not stated	0.80%
Distribution of religions

As of the 2011 census official report, Bhilwara Municipal Corporation had 74,184 households and a population of 359,483, of which 46,812 (13.02%) were under the age of 7. Bhilwara had a sex ratio of 922 females per 1000 males and a literacy rate of 82.20% for those 7 years and above. Scheduled Castes and Scheduled Tribes made up 47,692 (13.27%) and 4,488 (1.25%) of the population respectively.

Languages of Bhilwara (2011)
1. Hindi (52.6%)
2. Mewari (21.4%)
3. Rajasthani (18.1%)
4. Marwari (2.99%)
5. Urdu (2.14%)
6. Sindhi (1.39%)
7. Others (1.40%)

According to the 2011 census, 52.58% of the population recorded their first language as Hindi, 21.37% spoke Mewari, 18.13% Rajasthani, 2.99% Marwari, 2.14% Urdu, and 1.39% spoke Sindhi as their first language.

== Economy ==
Bhilwara is renowned throughout the world for its textile industry with more than 850 manufacturing units in the town. The main textile product is the synthetic fabric used in trousers. It began with a spinning and knitting company named Mewar Textile Mills, owned by industrialist Shri Sampatmal Lodha, started in 1938. Thereafter Shri Laxmi Niwas Jhunjhunwala started his first unit for synthetic textiles in 1961 at Bhilwara. Today, the fabric manufactured in Bhilwara is exported to many countries worldwide.

Bhilwara is known as the textile city of India. The city has a strong presence in the textile industry, with several textile mills and factories located in and around the city. The city is known for its production of high-quality cotton, silk, and woolen fabrics, which are exported to various parts of the world. Apart from textiles, the city is also known for its mining and agriculture industries.

== Infrastructure ==
=== Road connectivity ===
National Highway 48, part of the Golden Quadrilateral series of highways between India's major cities, and another National Highway No. 76 part of the East-West Corridor (four lane) pass through the district. The total length is 120 km.

National Highway 758 (Kota-Ladpura-Bhilwara-Gangapur-Rajsamand-Udaipur) passes through the district. The length of this highway is 146 km and other NH 148D (Bhim-Gulabpura-Uniara).

The total road length in the district was 3,883 km on 31 March 2000.

With a government bus depot in the heart of the city, Bhilwara is connected to all the important cities of Rajasthan and other states. Many private service providers are also available. Bhilwara is well connected by road to the capital city Jaipur and the distance is 253 kilometres.

=== Rail transport ===
The city is served by Bhilwara railway station. A broad gauge railway line connecting Ajmer, Jodhpur, Jaipur, Kota, Indore Junction, Ujjain, Delhi, Bharatpur, Agra, Gwalior, Lucknow, Kanpur, Allahabad, Patna, Kolkata, Chittorgarh, Udaipur, Mavli Jn., Ratlam, Vadodara, Surat, Mumbai and Hyderabad passes through the district. Kota (160 km) is the convenient railway station to provide connectivity to the southern states of Karnataka, Andhra Pradesh, Tamil Nadu and Kerala.

Ajmer (130 km) is one of the major nearby railway stations/junctions for connectivity to other major cities like Delhi and Ahmedabad.

=== Air transport ===
The nearest airport is at Dabok - Udaipur (165 km) — approximately 2.5 hours, by road. The other nearest airport is at Jaipur (251 km) which takes about 4 hours by road.

Recently, a new Airport has started named Kishangarh Airport near Ajmer (130 km) which is around 2Hrs, by road.

== Culture ==
Great Indian miniature artist Badri Lal Chitrakar highlights the city on international maps for Indian miniature art. He was given several awards including the Shilp Guru/Master Craftsperson award by the vice-president of India on 9 September 2006. Bhilwara is famous for its 'Fad Paintings' which are depictions of traditional stories on cloth using naturally available colours. Bhilwara's Phad Artist Shree Lal Joshi contributed greatly to making and saving Phad Painting to whole of India.

Attractions in Bhilwara include the Badnore Fort, Harni Mahadev Temple, Smriti van, Mansarovar Lake, Joganiya Mata Temple, Kyara Ke Balaji, Sanganer Fort, Meja dam, and Pur Udan Chatri.

== Education ==
Bhilwara has an autonomous engineering college of the Government of Rajasthan known as MLV Textile and Engineering College, which offers courses in engineering, including textile engineering and one Private University named Sangam University.

There is also a medical college named, Rajmata Vijaya Raje Scindia Medical College. Bhilwara has several schools and colleges, including engineering and medical colleges. The city is also known for its coaching centers, which provide coaching for various competitive exams like IIT-JEE, NEET, CA/CS/CMA.
