= Sukhadia =

Sukhadia may refer to:

- Mohan Lal Sukhadia (1916–1982), Indian politician belonging to Udaipur
- Indubala Sukhadia (1921–1999), wife, social, and political leader of Rajasthan
- Sukhadia Circle, a popular recreational centre in Udaipur
- Mohanlal Sukhadia University, a public university situated in Udaipur
- Sukhadia Stadium
