= Asian Powerlifting Championships 2016 =

Asian Powerlifting Championships
- Current season, competition or edition: Asian Powerlifting Championships 2016
- Sport: Powerlifting
- Founded: 1984
- Continent: Asia
- Website: Asian Powerlifting championships 2016

The Asian Powerlifting Championships 2016 was held in Udaipur, India from 7 June 2016 to 12 June 2016. It was organized by Powerlifting India (formerly Indian Powerlifting Federation), and sanctioned by Asian Powerlifting Federation and International Powerlifting Federation.

== See also ==
- Indian Powerlifting Federation
- International Powerlifting Federation – 1975 World Congress and Championships
