= Ambrai Ghat =

- Type: Pier
- Coordinates: 24°34′39″N 73°40′40″E
- Official name: Manjhi Ghat
- Owner: Nagar Parishad of Udaipur

Ambrai Ghat or Manjhi Ghat and Hanuman Ghat is a main ghat situated near the waterfront of Lake Pichola in Udaipur. It is situated opposite to the Gangaur Ghat, near the Jagdish Chowk area. Ambrai Ghat is a gateway to a delighting experience that passes from the old streets of the area called the ‘Old City’ in Udaipur. Ambrai Ghat has been maintained well by the Nagar Parishad of Udaipur, marble boundaries are installed and wide seats for resting are available on the Ghat.

== Overview ==
Ambrai Ghat is a popular for its lake-side location surrounded by many popular hotels. It is also popular for the picturesque view of City Palace, Udaipur, and surrounding lakes.

== See also ==
- Udaipur
- Tourist Attractions in Udaipur
- Lake Pichola
- City Palace, Udaipur
- Gangaur Ghat
