= Indian Powerlifting Federation =

National governing body of powerlifting in India

Coordinates: 22.8086709°N 86.1702114°E

- Sport: Powerlifting
- Category: Sports Federation
- Jurisdiction: India
- Abbreviation: IPF
- Founded: 1975; 50 years ago
- Headquarters: Jamshedpur, India
- President: Shri Satya Prakash Masih

Official website
- www.indianpowerliftingfederation.in
- (India)

The Indian Powerlifting Federation is a national governing body for the sport of powerlifting as recognized by the Ministry of Youth Affairs and Sports, Government of India as well as The Indian Olympic Association. It currently has over 10,000 members throughout the country. It also has 37 affiliated State Association and 6 Central Govt. Office Board Units.

== Events ==
The Indian Powerlifting Federation is organizing the Asian Powerlifting Championships 2016, which is to be held from 7 June 2016 to 12 June 2016 in Udaipur.

== See also ==
- International Powerlifting Federation - 1975 World Congress and Championships
