= Pratap Park =

Coordinates: 24.5704228°N 73.6599°E

Pratap Park Vinay
- Garden and Open Gym
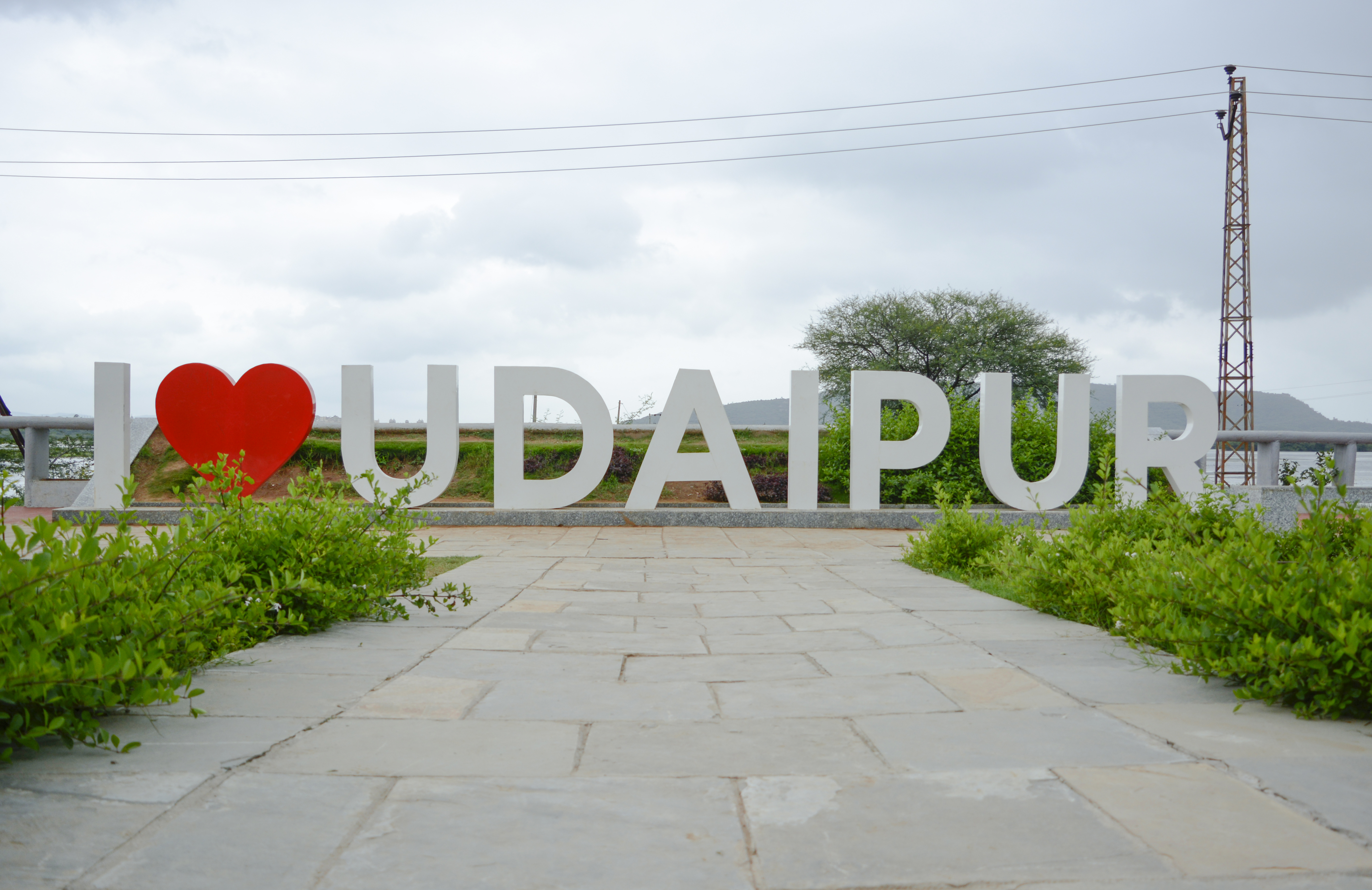
- A picture showing I LOVE UDAIPUR Structure placed in Pratap Park, taken from front angle.

- Location in Rajasthan, India Pratap Park (India)
- Country: India
- State: Rajasthan
- District: Udaipur
- Elevation: 328 m (1,076 ft)

Languages
  - Official: Hindi
- Time zone: UTC+5:30 (IST)
- Telephone code: 0294

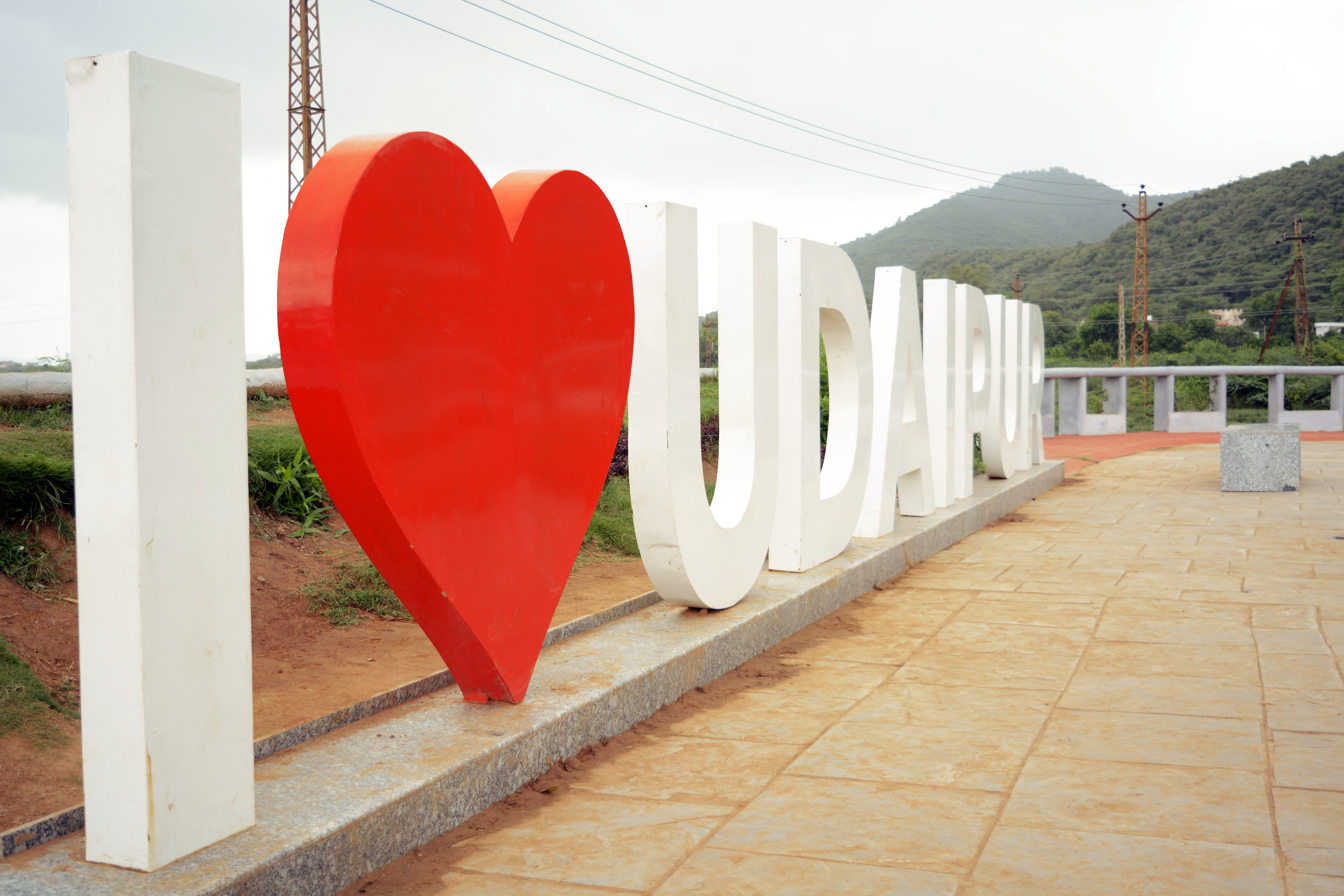
A picture showing I LOVE UDAIPUR Structure placed in Pratap Park, taken from side angle.

Pratap Park is a new garden and open gym in Udaipur, Rajasthan, India. It is situated near the bank of Pichola Lake.

== General ==
The park is situated on the southern bank of Lake Pichola, along with the Pichola Ring Road. It covers 1.377 acres of land and contains gardens with a variety of floral plantation, and parking space in and around the garden.

== Features ==
The park features a -sized letter sculpture reading "I LOVE UDAIPUR", with a view Lake Pichola and the City Palace in the background. The open gymnasium comprises mechanical structures and equipment that can be used by visitors free charge. There is also an acupressure walking track, around 250 m in length, that runs around the outlines the garden. The park is equipped with solar lights, Neem fertilizers, and recycled cement slurry tiles.

== Access ==
Pratap Park is situated in a rather remote area and has no direct public transport connection. Visitors can reach to this place only via private vehicle or hired taxi or rickshaw. It can be reached from two roads - via Mulla Talai, taking a diversion from the Eklavya colony; or via the Jungle Safari route which starts from Doodh Talai Lake, and leads to Pratap Park.
