= Sukhadia Circle =

Recreational centre in Udaipur, India

Coordinates: 24°36′4.4784″N 73°41′27.0594″E

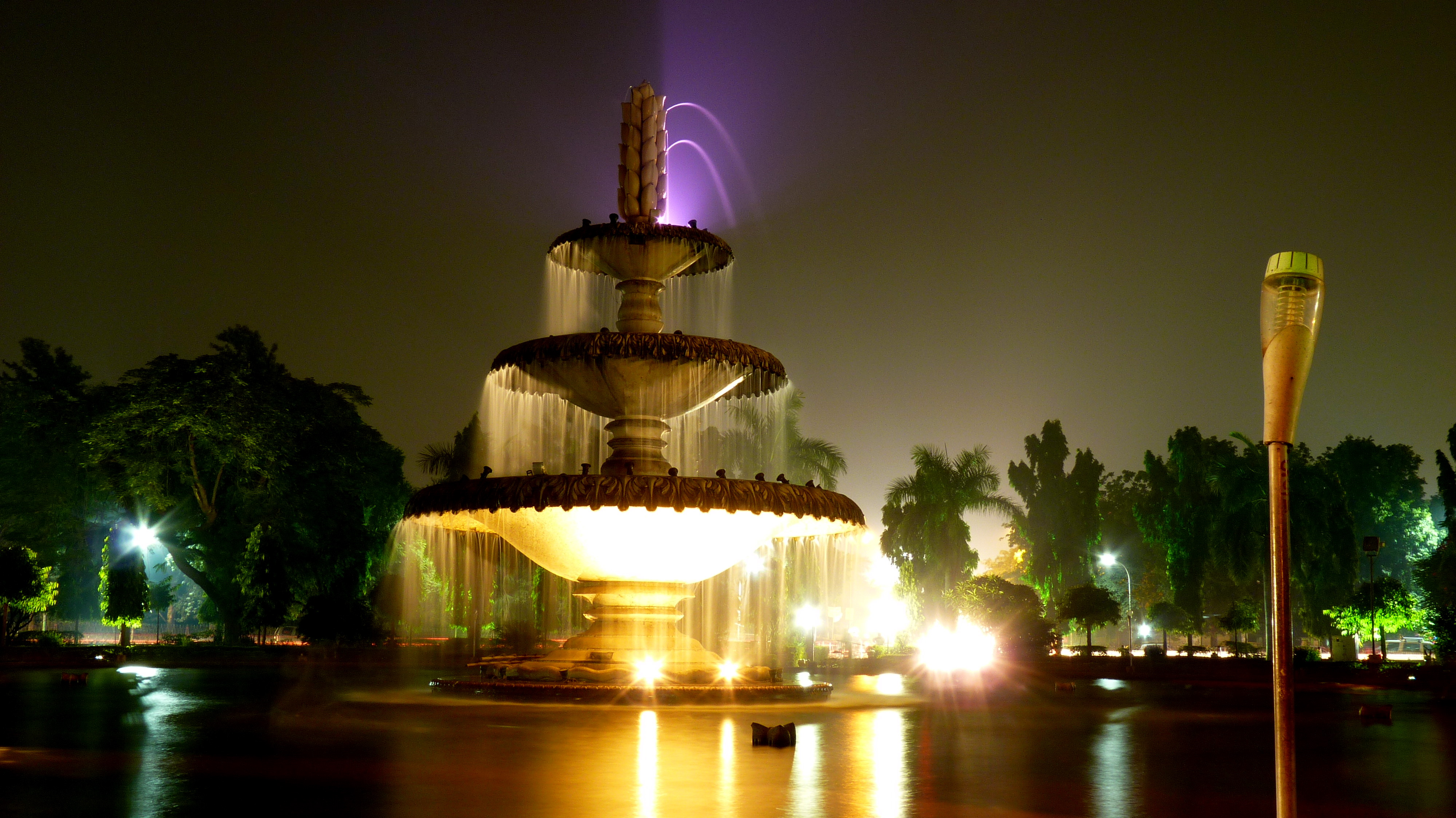
Sukhadia_circle

Sukhadia Circle (Square) is a popular recreational centre in Udaipur in Indian state of Rajasthan. It is a large roundabout in the city's northern suburb of Panchwati, on the road to Ranakpur and Mt. Abu. It providing options for fast food centers, camel and horse rides, boat ride and kids play zone areas.

== Overview ==
Sukhadia Circle is a small pond, at center of which lies a 21 ft high three-tiered fountain. The fountain is made of white marble, and is shaped like a wheat-ear motif, which stands as a symbol of prosperity. The pond offers boat ride, and options for camel and horse ride around the Sukhadia Circle are also available. It is also surrounded by many small gardens and food joints, and kids play-zone areas around it.

== History ==
Sukhadia Circle was built in 1968 and opened for public in 1970. It has been named after Late Mohan Lal Sukhadia, the ex-Chief Minister of Rajasthan and a native of Udaipur.

== Access and charges ==
It is situated at city's northern suburb of Panchwati, which is around 4.6 km from Udaipur City railway station. Visitors can take auto-rickshaws and taxis to reach Sukhadia Circle. There is no visiting fee for the fountain, while boat-ride and other rides has nominal charges.
