= Udaipur =

City in Rajasthan, India

- City
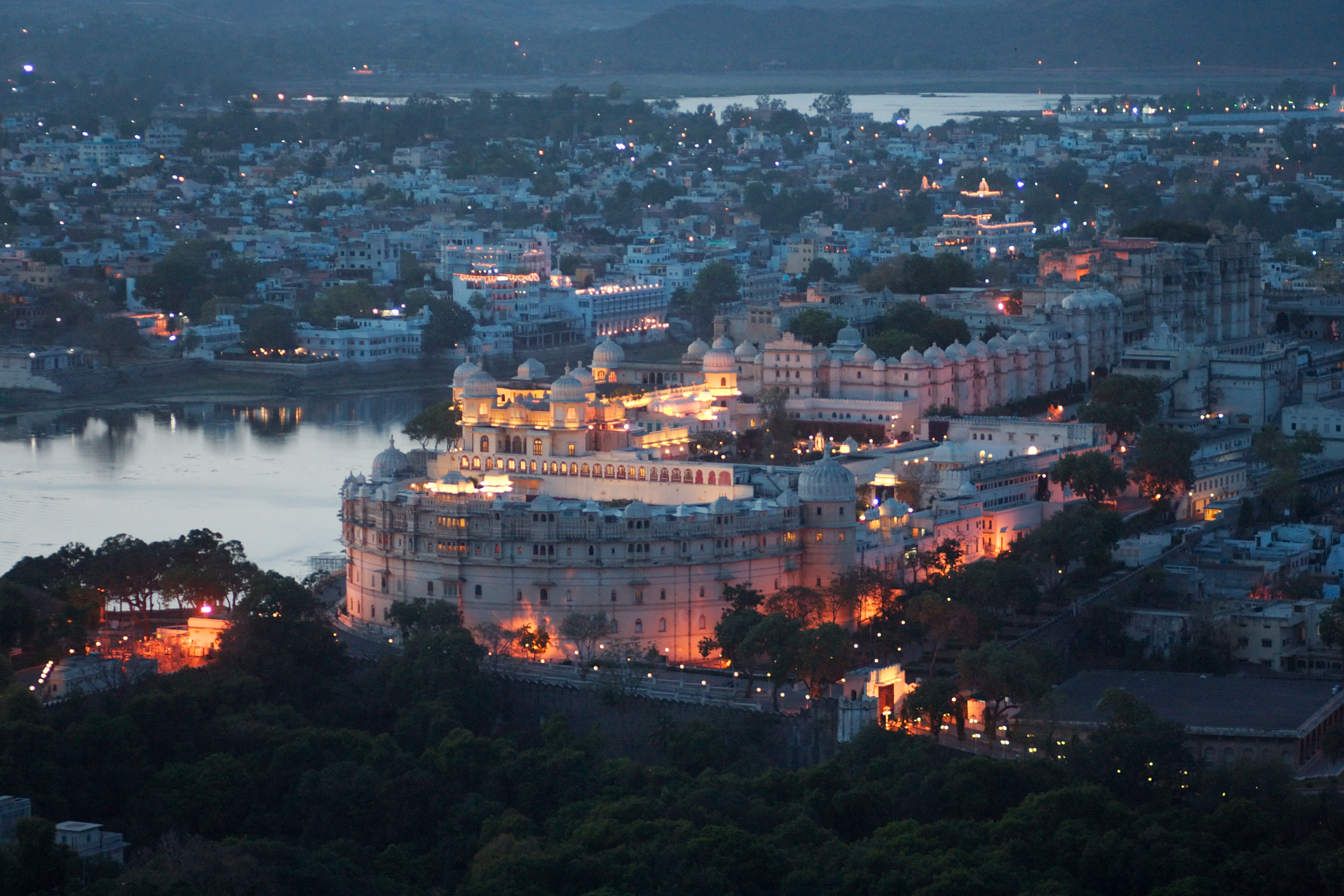
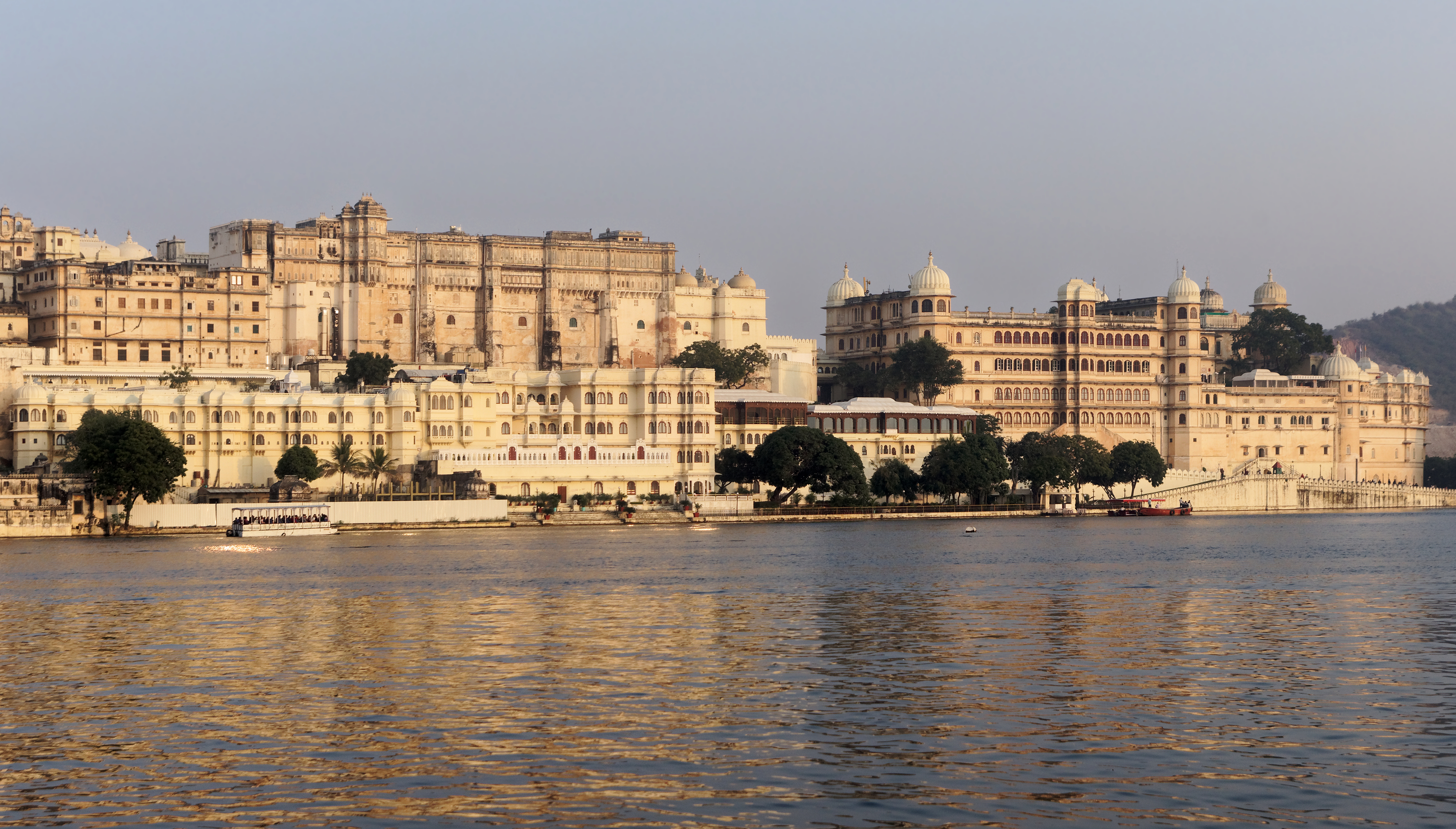
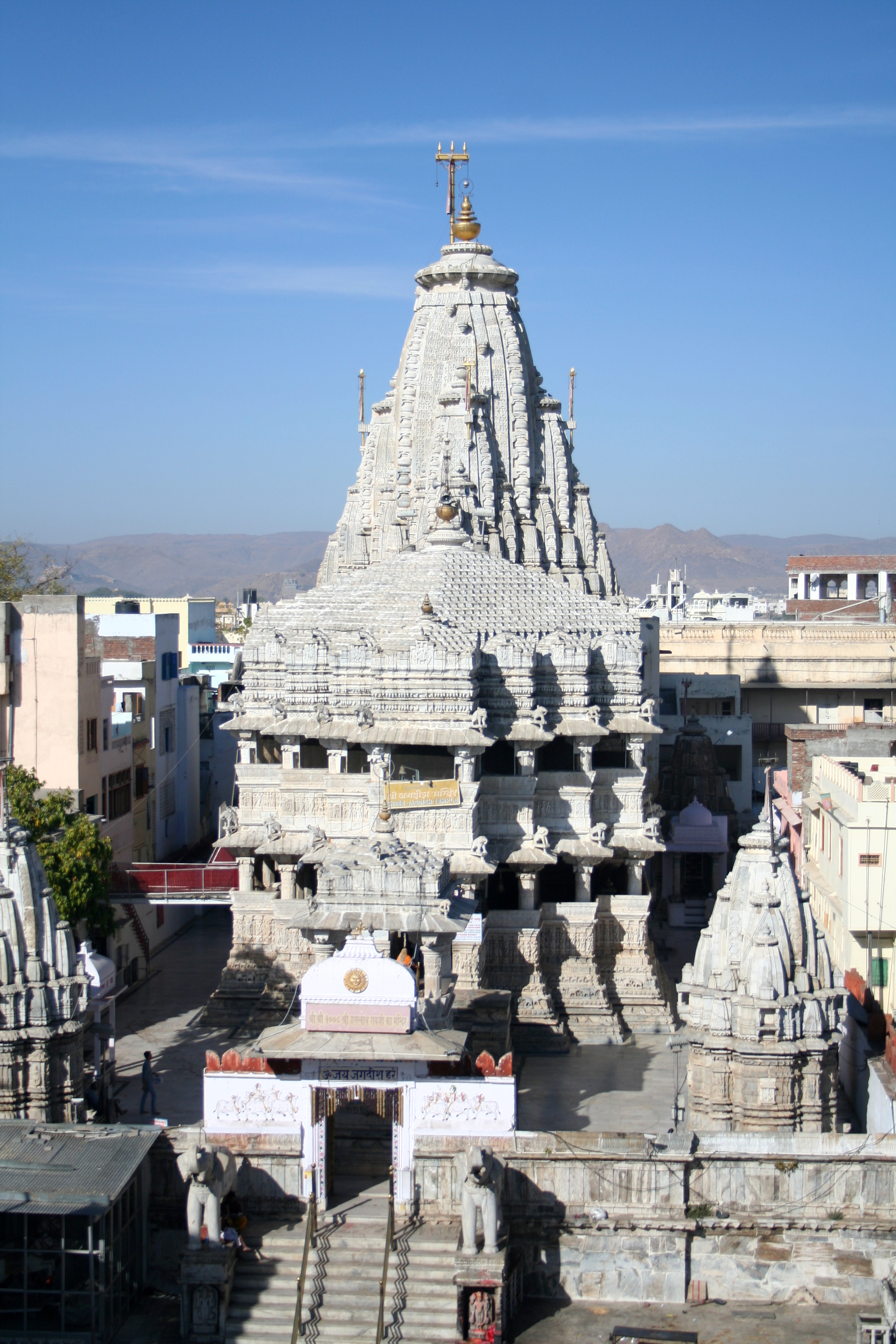
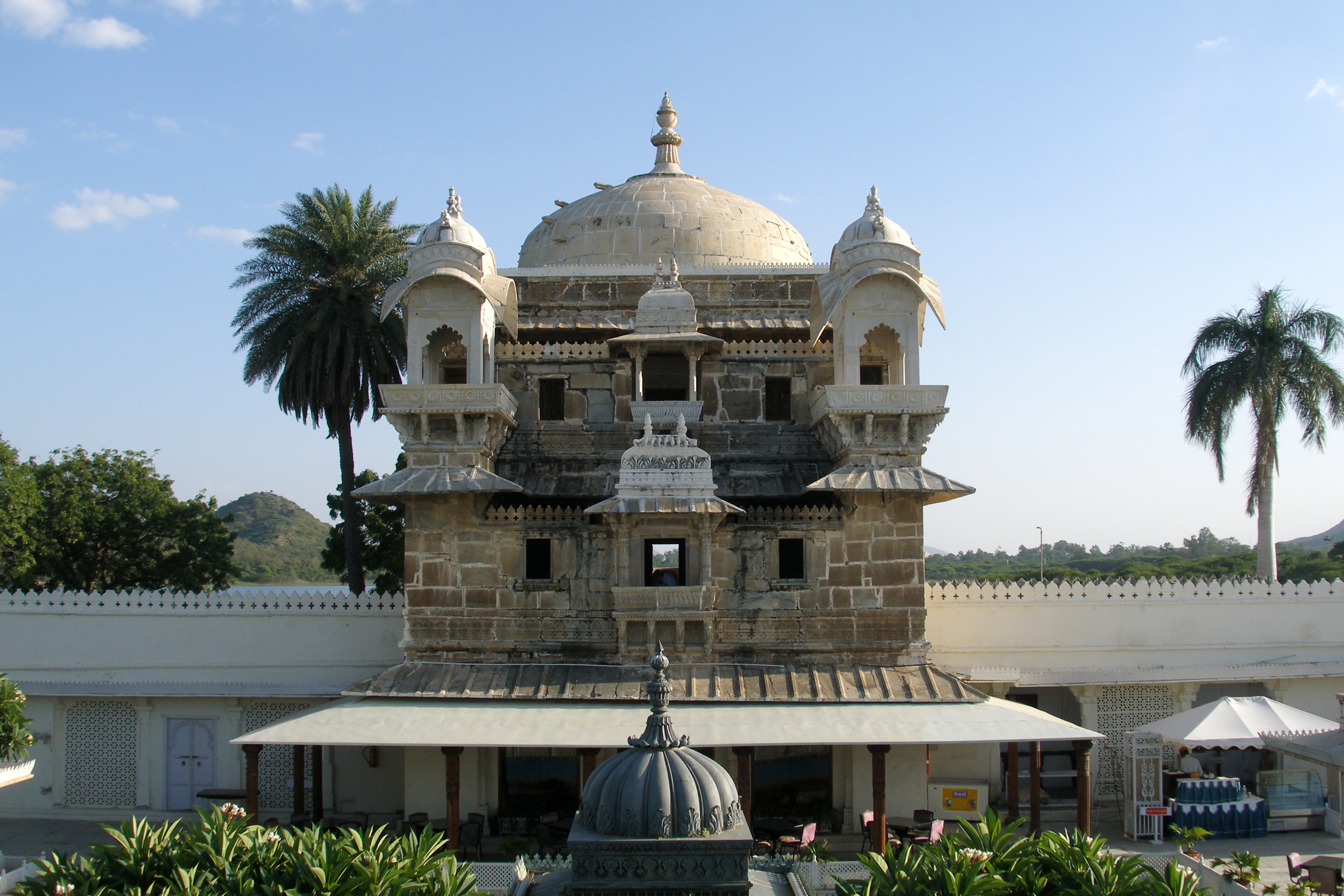
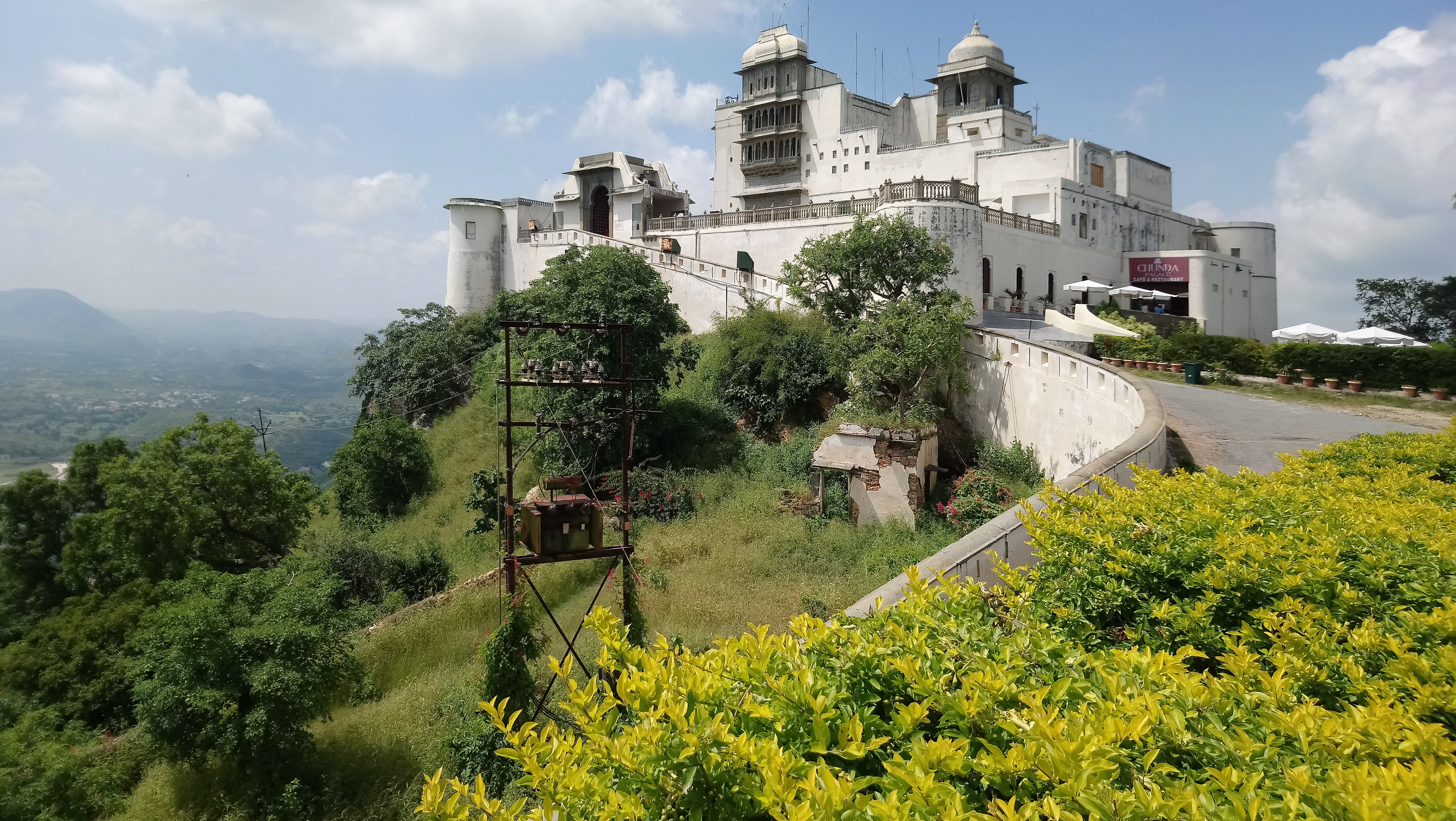
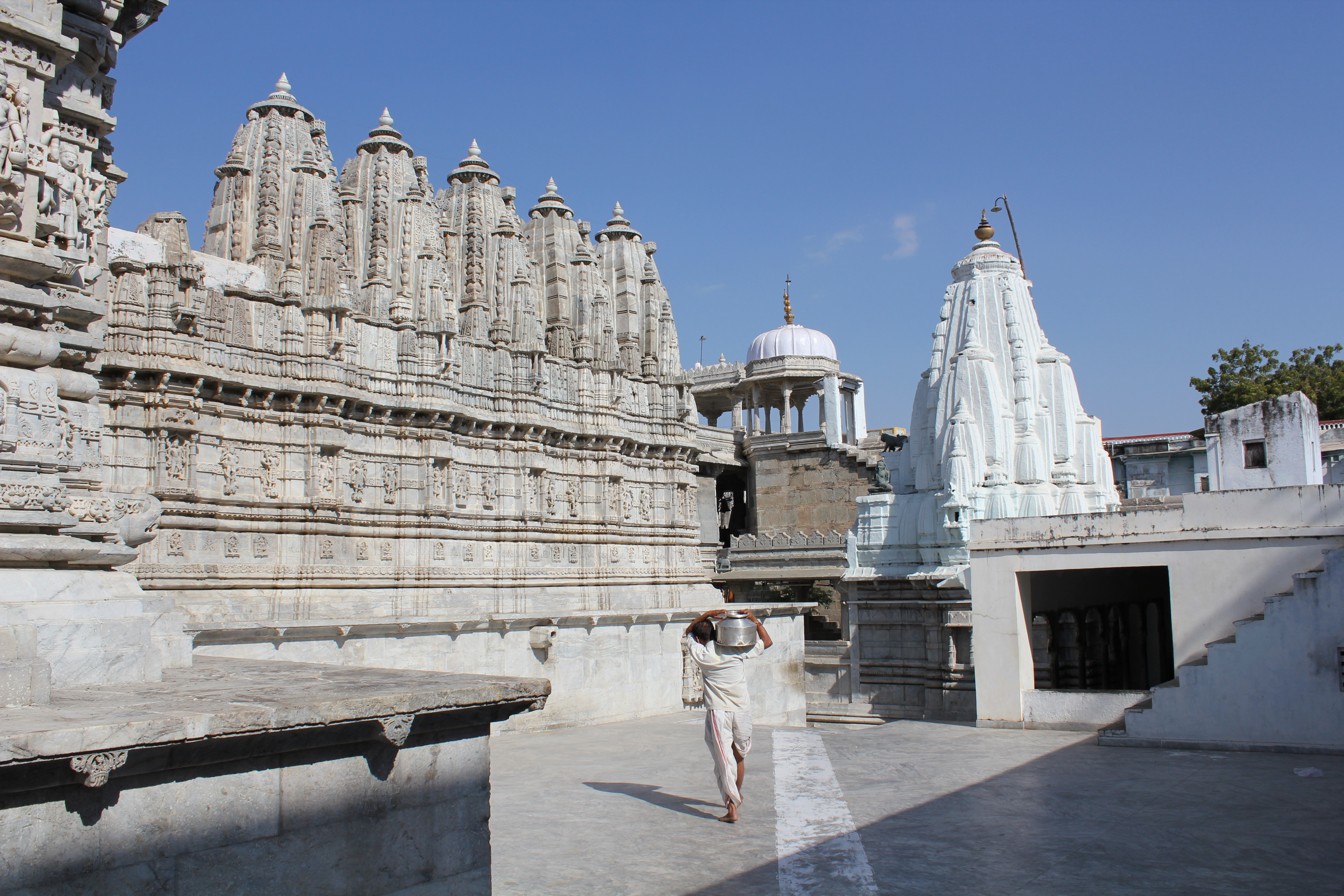
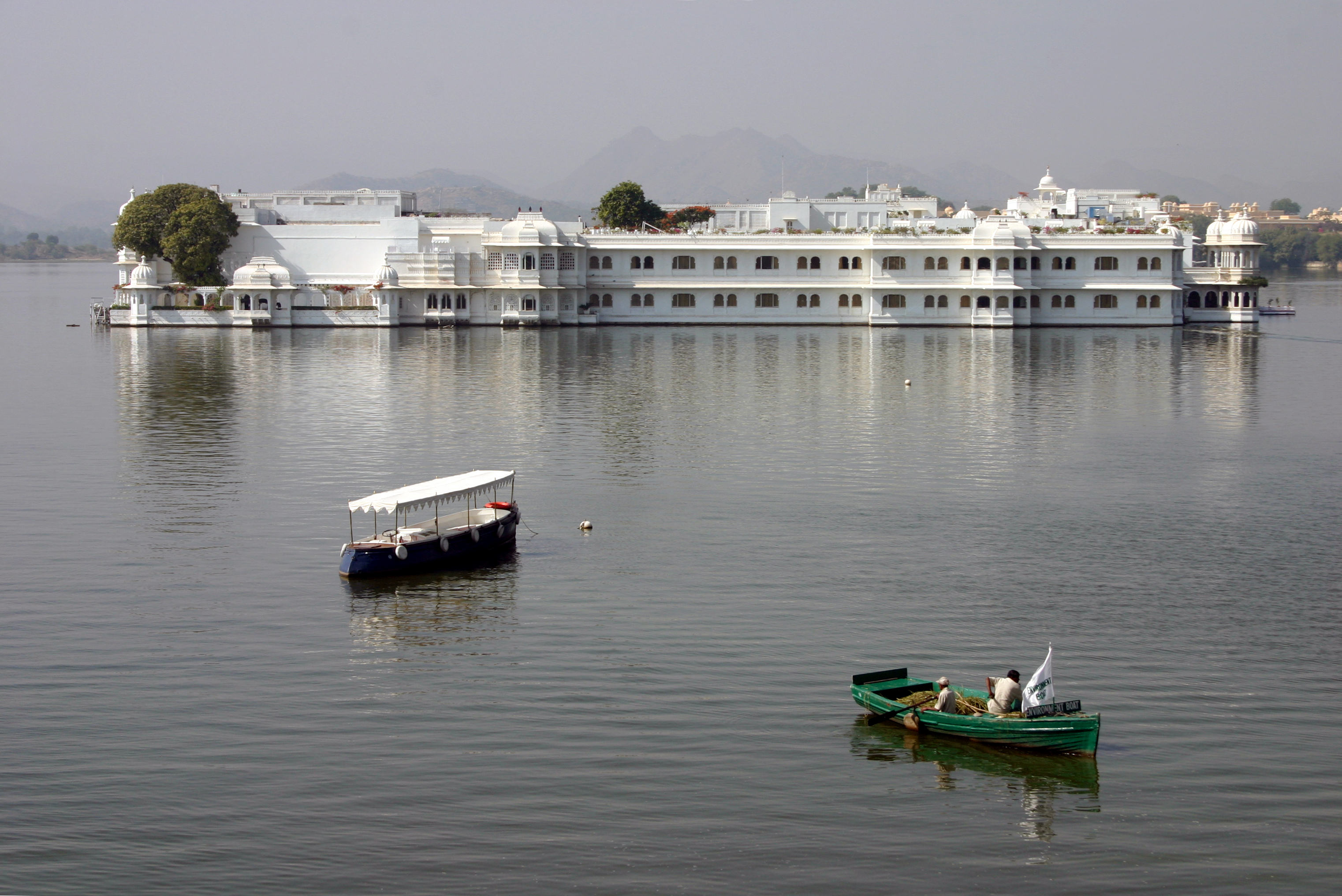
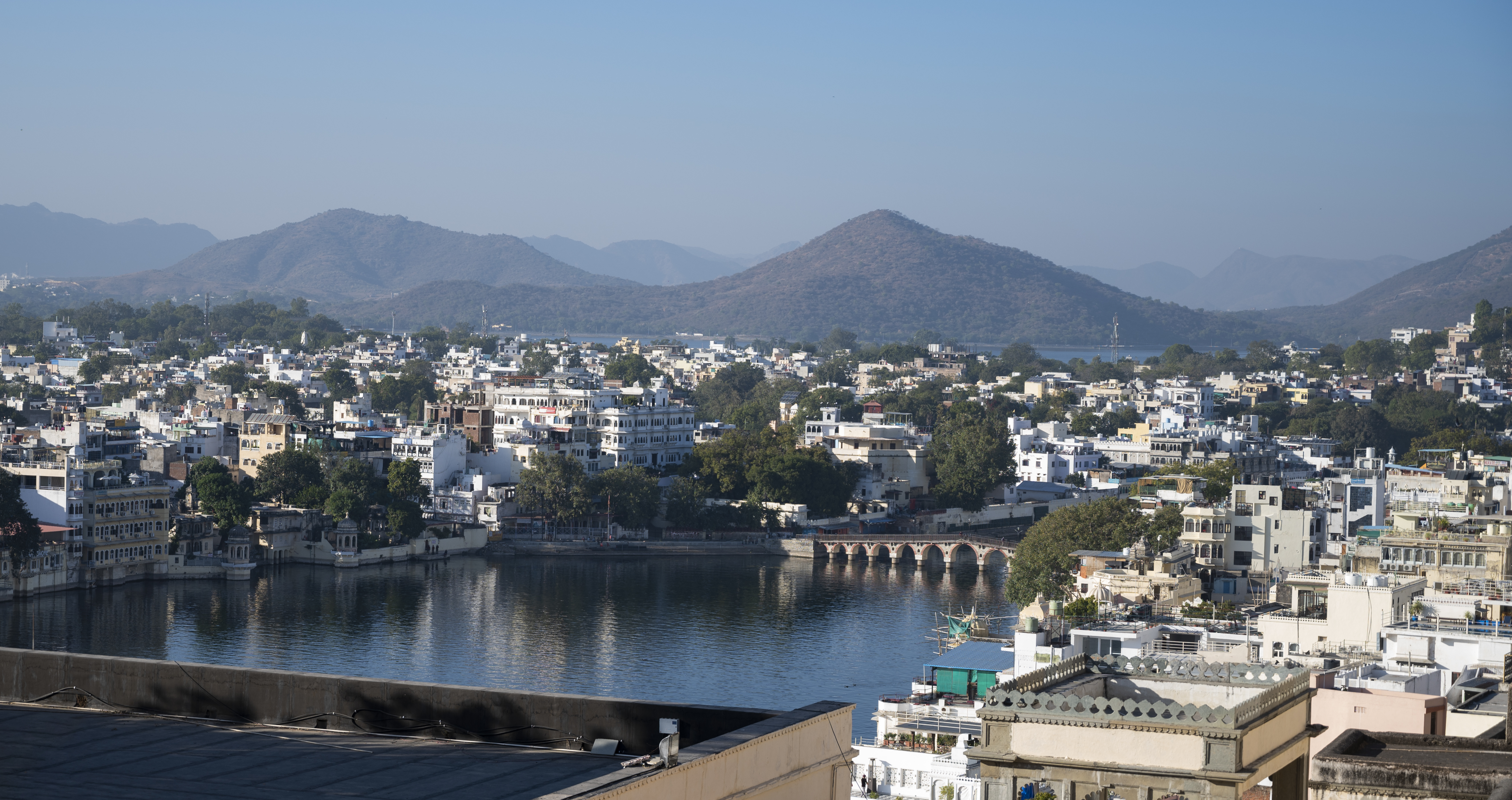
- Evening view of the city City Palace complex Jagdish Temple Jag Mandir Monsoon Palace Kesariyaji Temple Lake Palace in Pichola Lake Udaipur landscape
- Nicknames: The White City, City of Lakes
- Location in Rajasthan, India Udaipur (India)
- Coordinates: 24.58°N 73.68°E
- Country: India
- State: Rajasthan
- District: Udaipur
- Established: 1559; 467 years ago
- Founder: Udai Singh II
- Named for: Udai Singh II

Government
  - Type: Municipal Corporation
  - Body: Udaipur Municipal Corporation
  - Mayor: Paras singhvi (BJP)

Area
  - Total: 132 km^{2} (51 sq mi)
- Elevation: 423 m (1,388 ft)

Population (2011)
  - Total: 474,531
  - Density: 3,590/km^{2} (9,310/sq mi)

Languages
  - Official: Hindi
  - Additional: English
  - Regional: Rajasthani; Mewari
- Time zone: UTC+5:30 (IST)
- PIN: 313001- 313024
- Area code: +91294xxxxxx
- Vehicle registration: RJ-27, RJ-58
- Climate: BSh
- Website: www.udaipur.rajasthan.gov.in

Udaipur (Hindi: IPA: [ʊdəjpʊɾ],) (ISO 15919: Udayapura) is a city in the north-western Indian state of Rajasthan, about 415 km (258 mi) south of the state capital Jaipur. It serves as the administrative headquarters of Udaipur district. It is the historic capital of the kingdom of Mewar in the former Rajputana Agency. It was founded in 1559 by Udai Singh II of the Sisodia clan of Rajputs, when he shifted his capital from the city of Chittorgarh to Udaipur after Chittorgarh was besieged by Akbar. It remained as the capital city till 1818 when Mewar became a British princely state, and thereafter the Mewar province became a part of Rajasthan when India gained independence in 1947. It is also known as the City of Lakes, as it is surrounded by five major artificial lakes.

The city is located in the southernmost part of Rajasthan near the Gujarat border. To its west is the Aravalli Range, which separates it from the Thar Desert. It is placed close to the median point between two major Indian metro cities, around 660km from Delhi and 800km from Mumbai. Besides, connectivity with Gujarat ports gives Udaipur a strategic geographical advantage. Udaipur is well connected with nearby cities and states by means of road, rail and air transportation facilities. The city is served by the Maharana Pratap Airport. Common languages spoken include Mewari, Rajasthani, Hindi and English.

Dubbed "the most romantic spot on the continent of India" by British administrator James Tod, Udaipur is a tourist destination and is known for its history, culture, scenic locations and the Rajput-era palaces. It has seven lakes surrounding the city. Five of the major lakes, namely Fateh Sagar Lake, Lake Pichola, Swaroop Sagar Lake, Rangsagar, and Doodh Talai Lake, have been included under the restoration project of the National Lake Conservation Plan (NLCP) of the Government of India. Besides lakes, Udaipur is also known for its historic forts and palaces, museums, galleries, natural locations and gardens, architectural temples, as well as traditional fairs, festivals and structures. Due to the several lakes present here, it is one of several cities in Asia that are sometimes called the "Venice of the East". Udaipur's economy is primarily driven by tourism, though minerals, marble processing, chemical manufacturing and development, electronic manufacturing and the handicraft industry are also contributors. Udaipur hosts several state and regional public offices, including offices of Director of Mines and Geology, Commissioner of Excise, Commissioner of Tribal Area Development, and Rajasthan State Mines and Minerals Limited, as well as major private companies like Hindustan Zinc. Udaipur is rising as an educational hub as well, with 5 universities, 14 colleges and more than 160 high schools.

== History ==
Udaipur as it is today was founded by Maharana Udai Singh II in 1559, the father of Maharana Pratap. Udai Singh decided that the best spot for his new capital was around Lake Pichola and Udaipur turned into the city it now is.

=== Establishment as a city ===
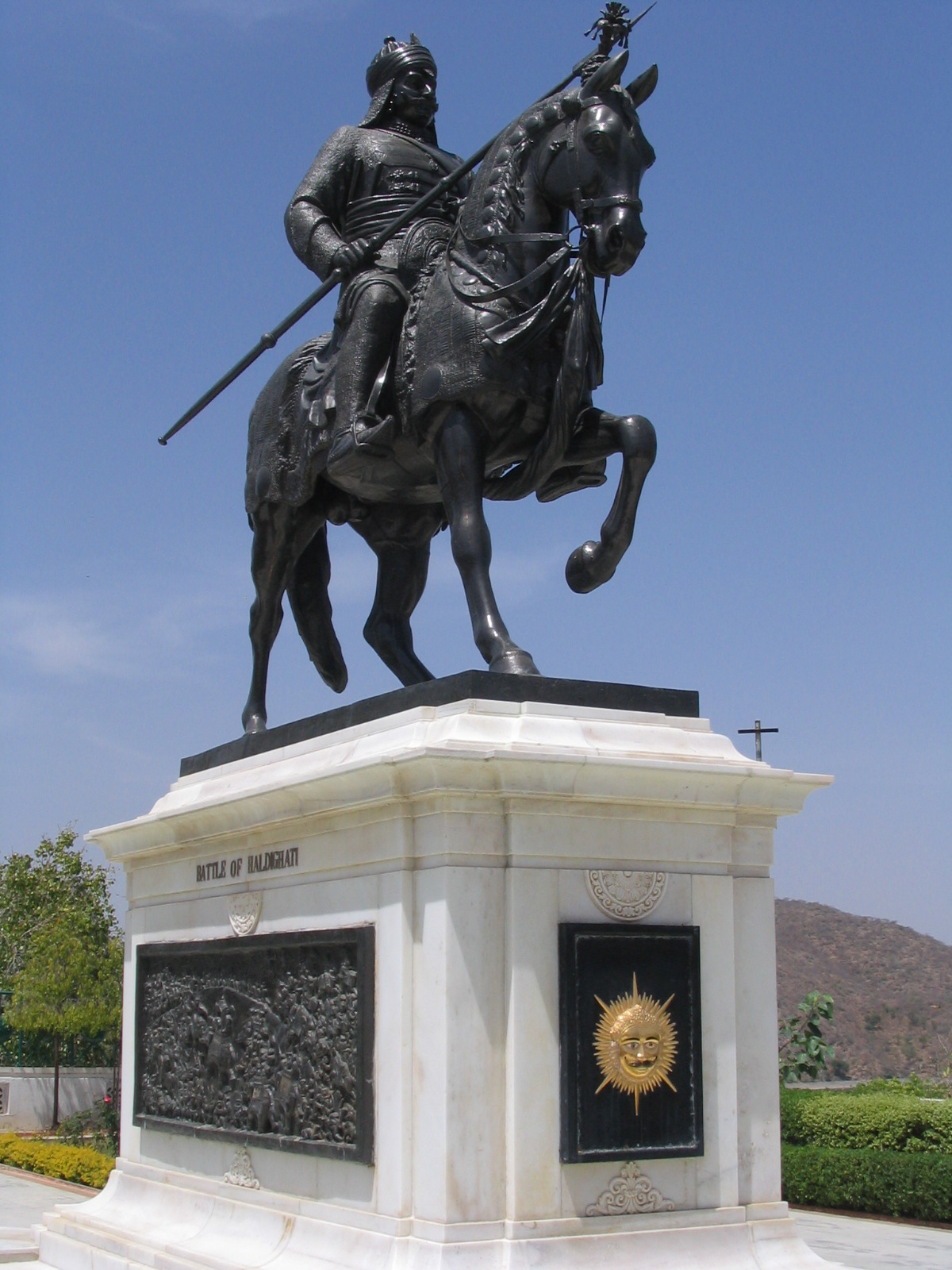
Statue of Maharana Pratap of Mewar, commemorating the Battle of Haldighati.

Udaipur was founded in 1559, by Maharana Udai Singh II in the fertile circular Girwa Valley to the southwest of Nagda, on the Banas River. The city was established as the new capital of the Mewar kingdom. This area already had a thriving trading town, Ayad, which had served as the capital of Mewar in the 10th through 12th centuries. The Girwa region was thus already well known to Chittorgarh rulers who moved to it whenever the vulnerable tableland Chittaurgarh was threatened with enemy attacks. Maharana Udai Singh II, in the wake of the 16th-century emergence of artillery warfare, decided during his exile at Kumbhalgarh Fort to move his capital to a more secure location. Ayad was flood-prone, hence he chose the ridge east of Pichola Lake to start his new capital city, where he came upon a hermit while hunting in the foothills of the Aravalli Range. In the myth, the hermit blessed the king and guided him to build a palace on the spot, assuring him it would be well protected. Udai Singh II consequently established a residence on the site. In November 1567, the Mughal Emperor Akbar conquered Chittor. To protect his territory from attack, Rana Udai Singh built a six-kilometre-long city wall, with seven gates, namely Surajpole, Chandpole, Udiapole, Hathipole, Ambapole, Brahmpole, Delhi Gate, and Kishanpole. The area within these walls and gates is still known as the old city or the walled city.

In September 1576, Akbar himself arrived at Udaipur and remained there for 6 months until May 1577. At that time, Akbar tried to conquer Udaipur in the Battle of Haldighati. However, Akbar was unable to capture Maharana Pratap, who resisted Mughal rule, and some sources even states that the battle was inconclusive. By the mid 18th century after the fall of the Mughal Empire it came under the influence of the Maratha Empire and became a tributary until late 18th Century, eventually becaming a princely state of British India in 1818. Being a mountainous region and unsuitable for heavily armoured Mughal horses, Udaipur remained safe from Mughal influence despite much pressure. At present, Maharana Mahendra Singh Mewar is the 76th custodian of the Mewar dynasty.

== Geography ==
Udaipur has been ranked 14th best "National Clean Air City" under (Category 2 3-10L Population cities) in India.

=== Topography ===
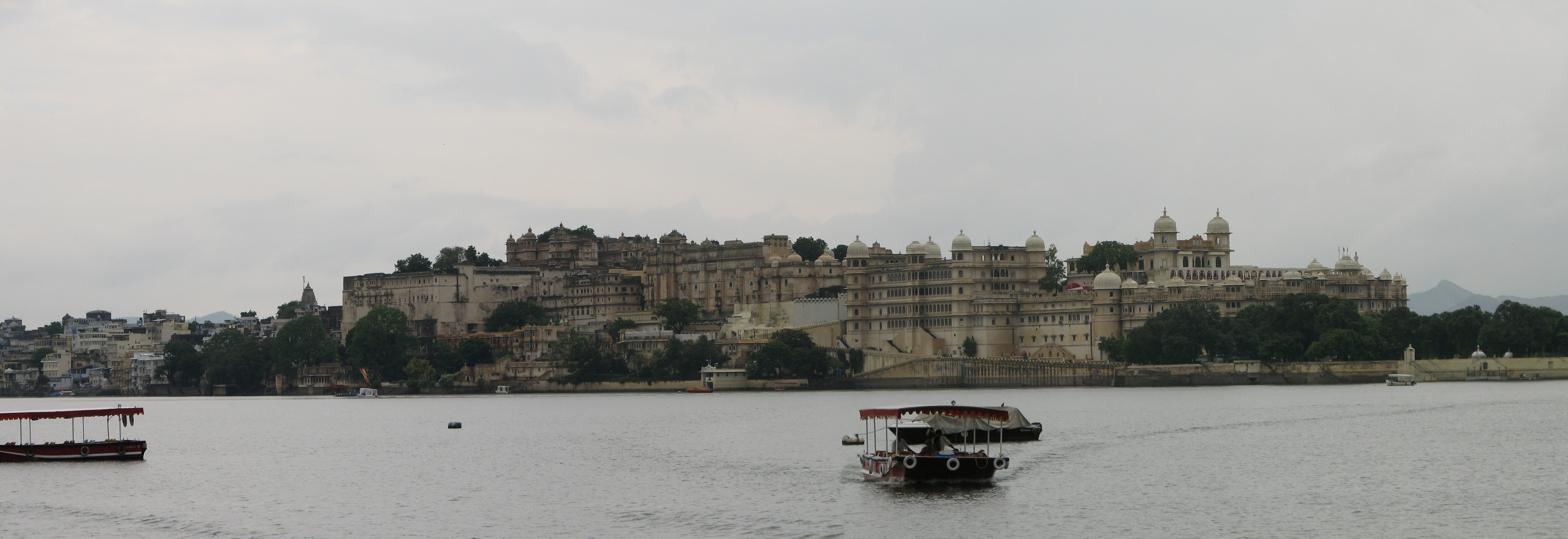
The City Palace alongside Lake Pichola.

Udaipur is located at 24.525049°N 73.677116°E. The city covers an area of 64 km^{2} (25 sq mi) and lies at an altitude of 598.00 m (1,962 ft) above sea level. It is located in the southern region of Rajasthan, near the Gujarat border. The city lies 403 km (250 mi) southwest of the state capital, Jaipur and 250 km (155 mi) northeast from Ahmedabad.

Udaipur with its lakes lies on the south slope of the Aravalli Range in Rajasthan. The northern part of the district consists generally of elevated plateaus, while the eastern part has vast stretches of fertile plains. The southern part is covered with rocks, hills and dense forest. There are two important passages in the Aravalli ranges viz. Desuri Nal and Saoke which serves as a link between Udaipur and Jodhpur District.

=== Udaipur Lake System ===
The lakes of the city being interconnected form a lake system which supports and sustains the groundwater recharge, water availability for drinking, agriculture, industries and is a source of employment through tourism. The lake system has three main lakes in its upper catchment area, six lakes within its municipal boundary and one lake in the downstream. The Udaipur lake system, arising out of the river Berach (Banas Basin) and its tributaries, is an integral component of the upper Berach basin. The upper Berach basin is a part of the Gangetic river system, wherein the river Berach meets river Ganga through the rivers Banas, Chambal and Yamuna.

The Udaipur Lake System can be divided into the following categories:

- Upper lakes: Lake Badi, Chhota Madar and Bada Madar
- City Lakes: Lake Pichola, Fateh Sagar Lake, Swaroop Sagar Lake, Rang Sagar, Kumharia Talab, Goverdhan Sagar.
- Downstream Lake: Udaisagar Lake
- River: Ahar River

Udaipur became one of India's first two cities to receive accreditation under the Ramsar Convention's Wetland City Accreditation Scheme. The process involved approximately two years of sustained multi-stakeholder collaboration among the district administration, WWF-India, the Rajasthan State Wetlands Authority, and the Ministry of Environment, Forest and Climate Change. Udaipur's accreditation was grounded in the city's rich network of interconnected lakes and its historically embedded culture of water conservation, dating to the royal Maharana dynasty whose rulers constructed extensive reservoirs to ensure permanent water security for the city's residents. The 'Venice of the East,' as Udaipur is historically known, hosts over 200 bird species including migratory visitors, and its lakes support local agriculture, urban ecology, and a thriving heritage tourism economy. The Pakshi Mitra network and Jheel Samvardhan Samiti are among the community platforms that have contributed to the city's conservation culture.

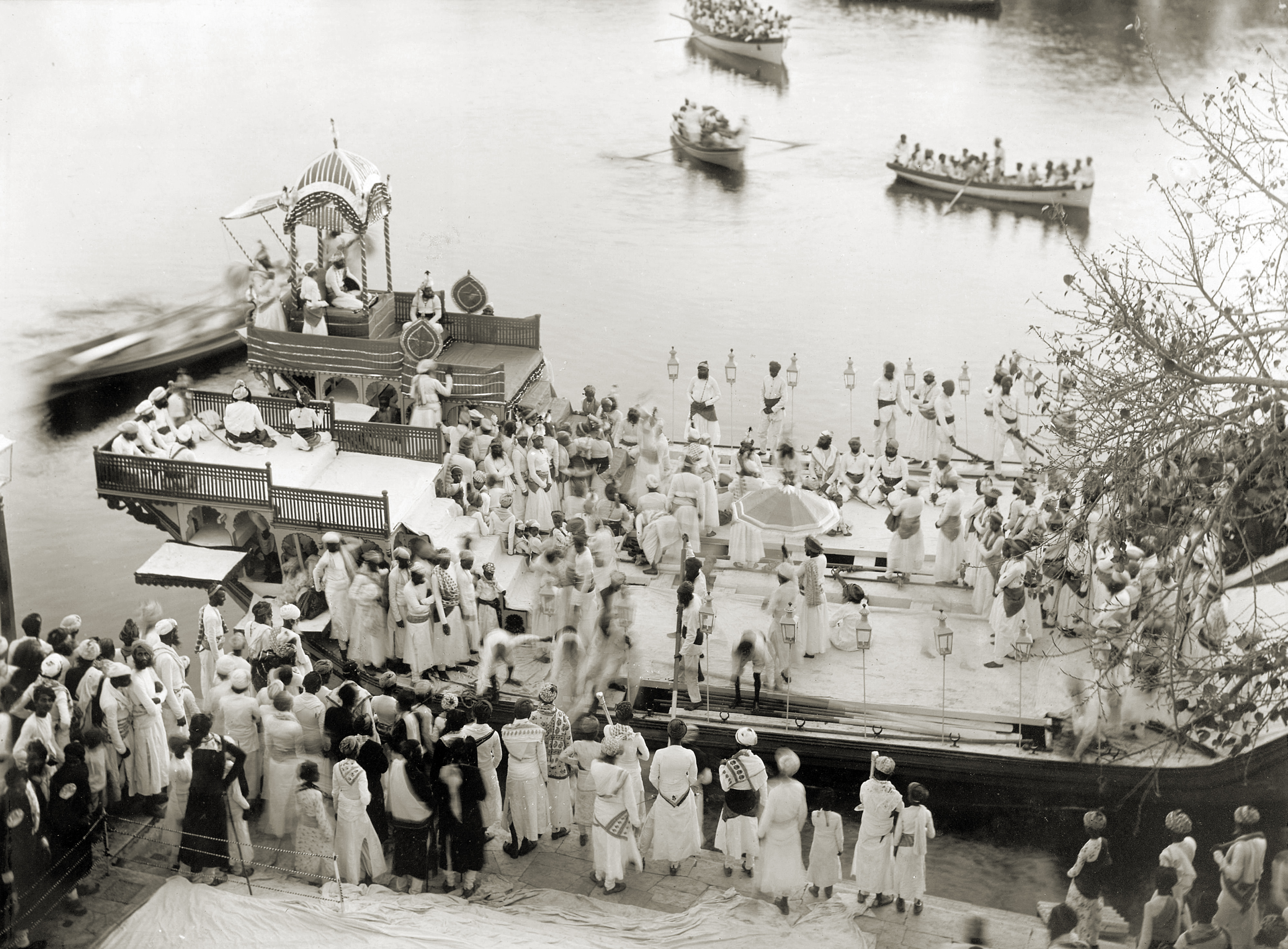
Maharana Fateh Singh (1884–1930) of Udaipur, on a royal barge, in Lake Pichola.

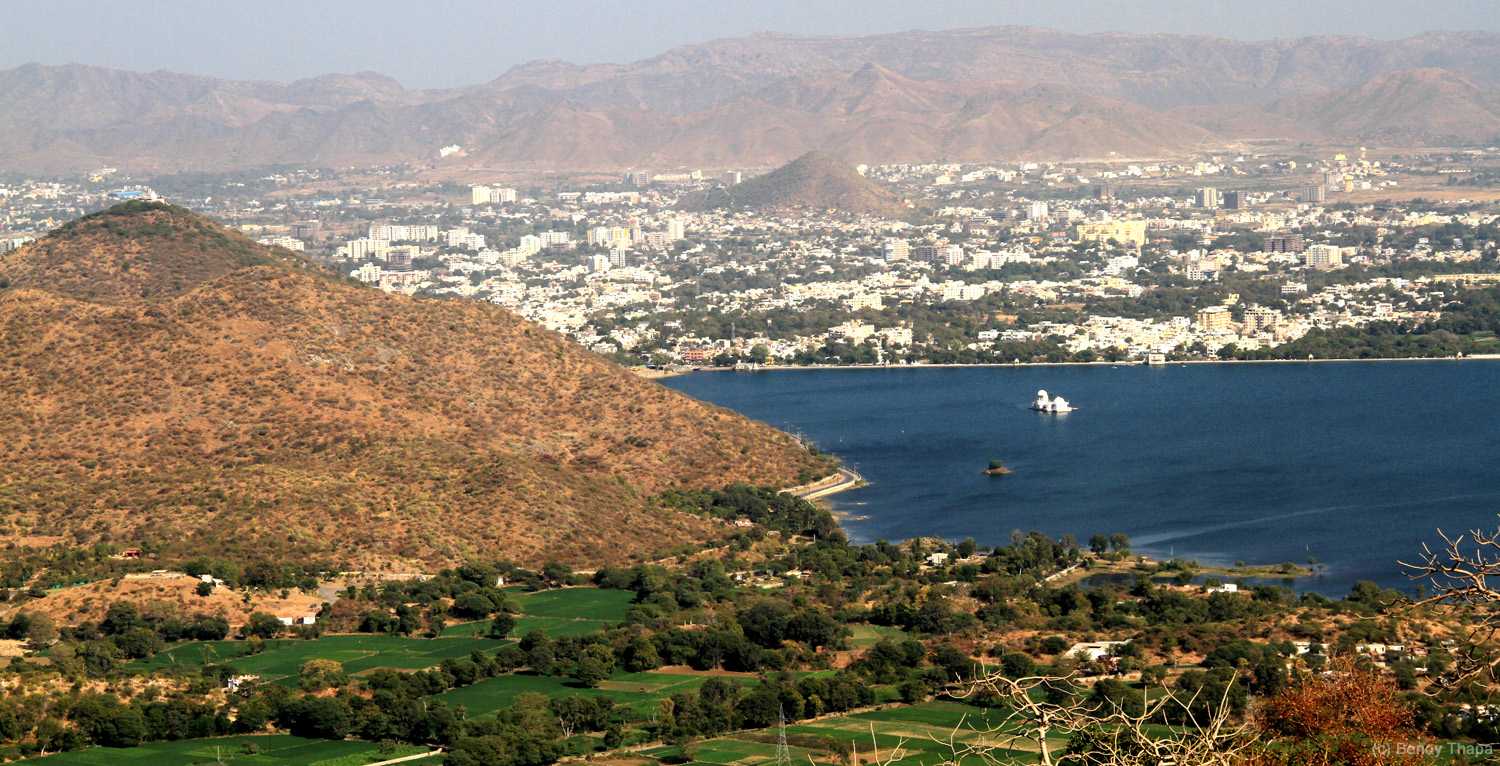
View of a Fateh Sagar Lake from a distance.

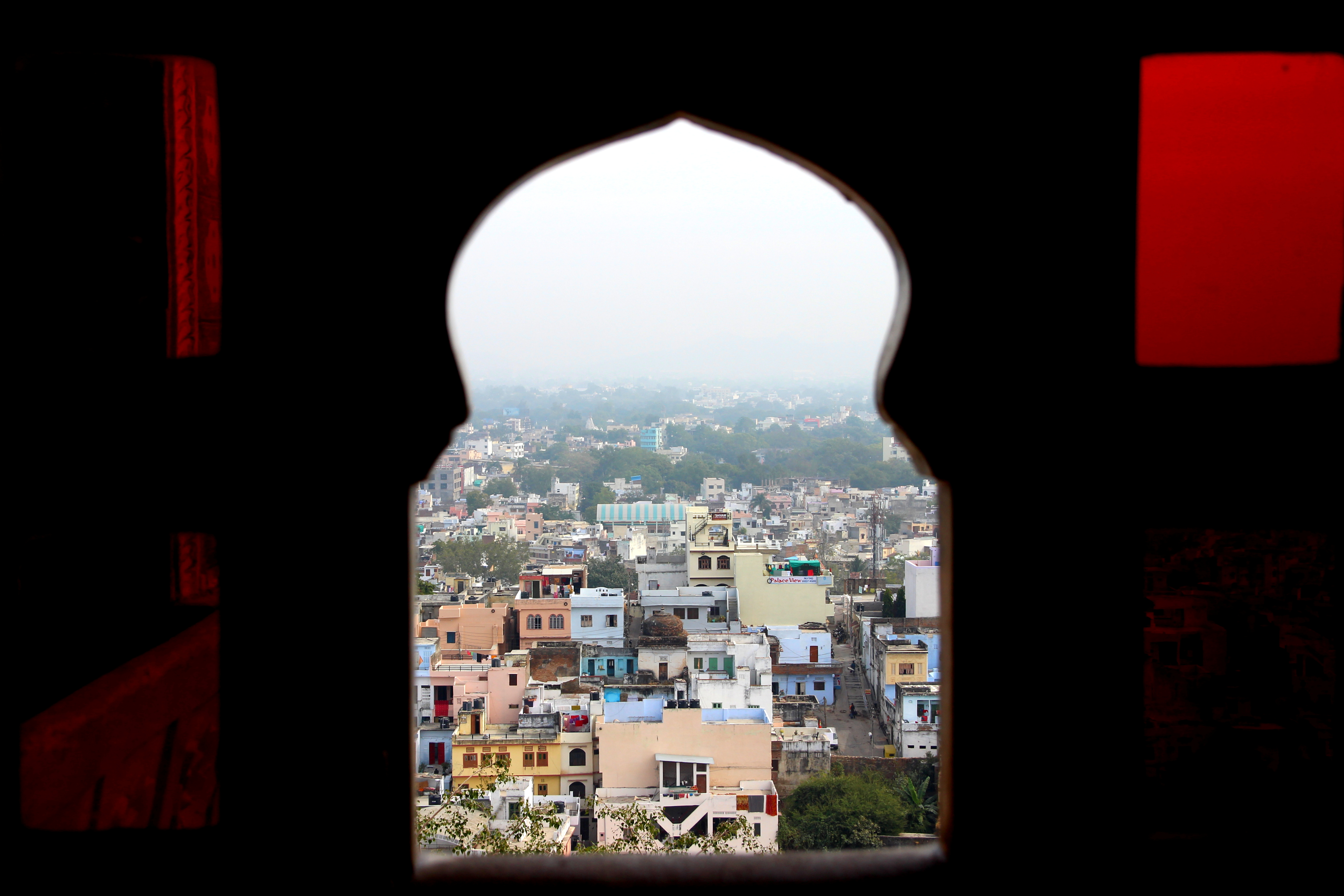
A view of Udaipur from City Palace, Udaipur.

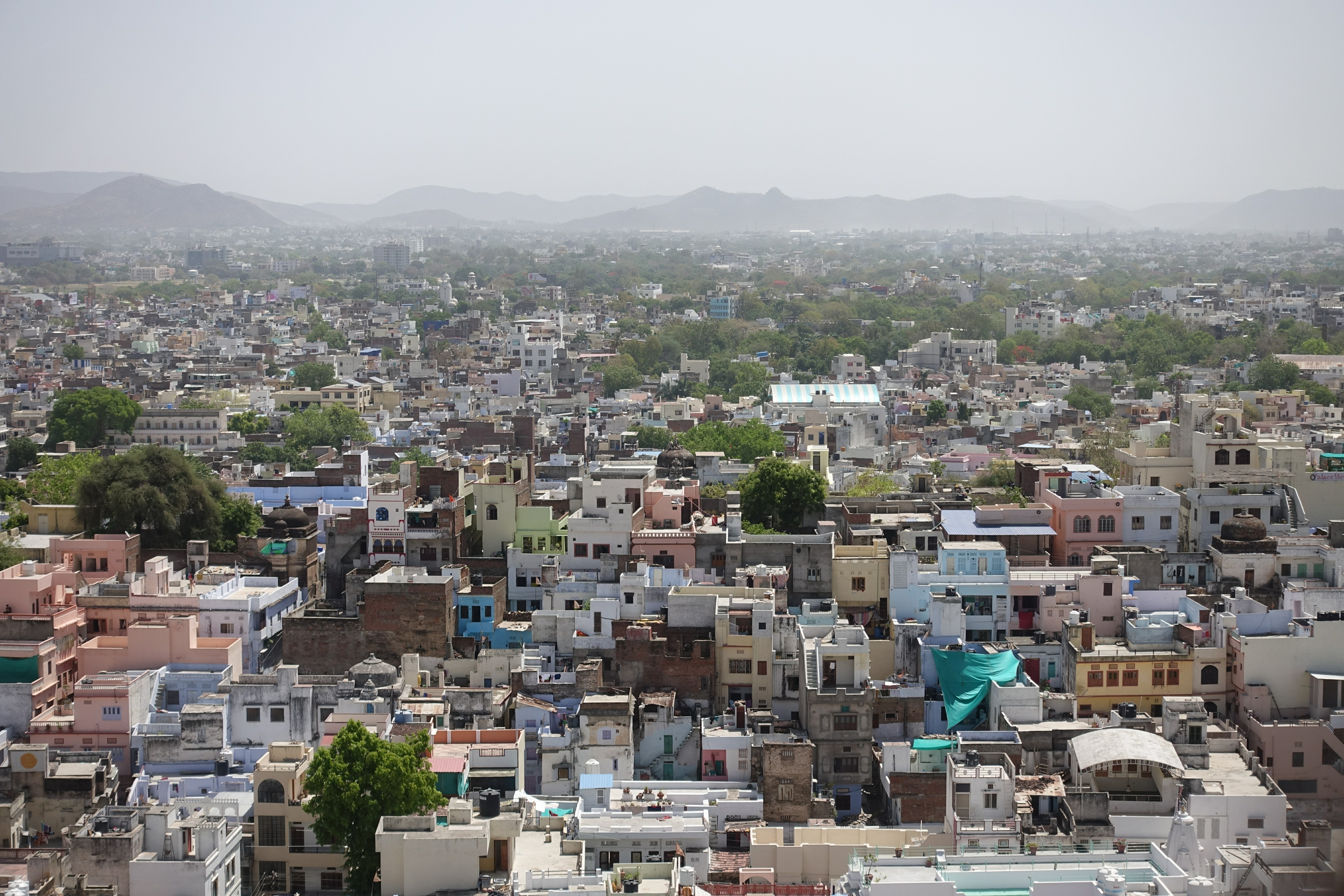
View of Udaipur as seen from the City Palace

== Climate ==
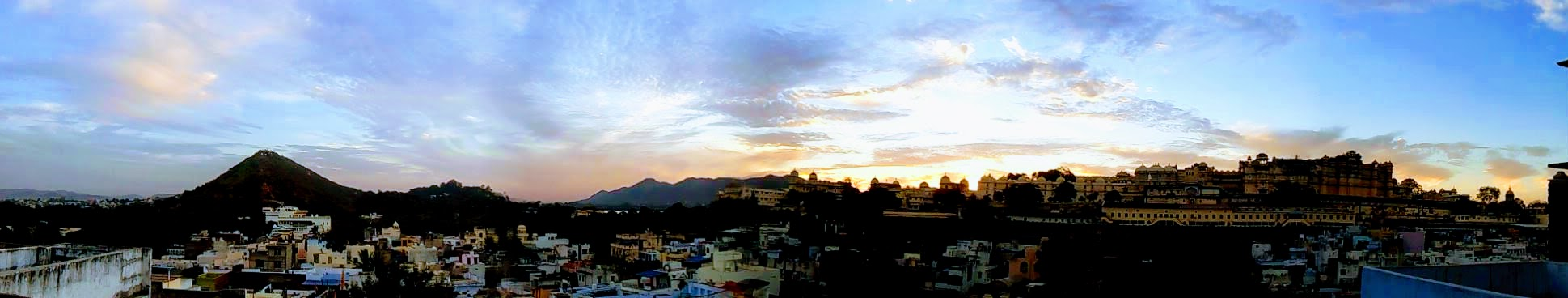
Panoramic view of old city of Udaipur with City Palace behind it.

Udaipur city has a hot semi-arid climate. The three main seasons, summer, monsoon and winter respectively, dominate the city of Udaipur. Being located in the desert lands of Rajasthan, the climate and weather of Udaipur is usually hot. The summer season runs from mid-March to June and touches temperature ranging from 23 °C (73 °F) to 44 °C (111 °F) in the months of March to June. Monsoons arrive in the month of July heralded by dust and thunderstorms. With its greenery and lakes, the city is one of the top monsoon destinations of the country. The winter season prevails from the month of October till the month of March. Humidity, which prevails during monsoons, diminishes at the arrival of winters. The city observes pleasant sunny days and enjoyable cool nights with the temperature ranging from 5 °C (41 °F) to 30 °C (86 °F).

Udaipur's monsoon and winter climates are the most appealing time to visit. Tourists arrive in large numbers, anytime between mid-September to late March or early April. Even in January, the coldest month, the days are bright, sunny and warm with maximum temperature around 28.3 °C (82.9 °F). Mornings, evenings and nights are cold.

Climate data for Udaipur Airport (1991–2020, extremes 1965–2012)
Month	Jan	Feb	Mar	Apr	May	Jun	Jul	Aug	Sep	Oct	Nov	Dec	Year
Record high °C (°F)	33.3 (91.9)	37.0 (98.6)	42.0 (107.6)	44.0 (111.2)	46.4 (115.5)	46.2 (115.2)	41.4 (106.5)	38.4 (101.1)	38.8 (101.8)	39.4 (102.9)	36.6 (97.9)	34.0 (93.2)	46.4 (115.5)
Mean daily maximum °C (°F)	24.5 (76.1)	27.9 (82.2)	33.6 (92.5)	37.8 (100.0)	40.2 (104.4)	37.5 (99.5)	32.2 (90.0)	30.5 (86.9)	32.1 (89.8)	33.4 (92.1)	29.8 (85.6)	26.0 (78.8)	32.2 (90.0)
Mean daily minimum °C (°F)	7.6 (45.7)	10.3 (50.5)	15.6 (60.1)	21.1 (70.0)	25.8 (78.4)	26.4 (79.5)	24.9 (76.8)	23.7 (74.7)	22.0 (71.6)	17.8 (64.0)	13.0 (55.4)	8.8 (47.8)	18.2 (64.8)
Record low °C (°F)	−1.3 (29.7)	−1.3 (29.7)	5.1 (41.2)	10.0 (50.0)	15.2 (59.4)	19.0 (66.2)	20.0 (68.0)	19.0 (66.2)	13.4 (56.1)	9.4 (48.9)	3.4 (38.1)	−0.9 (30.4)	−1.3 (29.7)
Average rainfall mm (inches)	3.0 (0.12)	1.3 (0.05)	1.7 (0.07)	7.8 (0.31)	11.0 (0.43)	76.8 (3.02)	235.6 (9.28)	205.4 (8.09)	112.1 (4.41)	13.7 (0.54)	5.2 (0.20)	0.8 (0.03)	674.2 (26.54)
Average rainy days	0.2	0.3	0.2	0.7	1.0	4.7	9.6	9.8	5.9	0.9	0.5	0.2	33.9
Average relative humidity (%) (at 17:30 IST)	34	28	21	19	23	42	66	71	60	36	36	36	40
Source: India Meteorological Department

Climate data for Udaipur City (extremes 1901–2008)
Month	Jan	Feb	Mar	Apr	May	Jun	Jul	Aug	Sep	Oct	Nov	Dec	Year
Record high °C (°F)	30.8 (87.4)	36.7 (98.1)	39.1 (102.4)	44.4 (111.9)	44.6 (112.3)	43.4 (110.1)	40.0 (104.0)	35.6 (96.1)	37.8 (100.0)	37.7 (99.9)	35.0 (95.0)	33.8 (92.8)	44.6 (112.3)
Record low °C (°F)	0.9 (33.6)	0.4 (32.7)	5.2 (41.4)	10.6 (51.1)	16.3 (61.3)	16.7 (62.1)	18.6 (65.5)	15.2 (59.4)	11.8 (53.2)	8.6 (47.5)	3.8 (38.8)	0.6 (33.1)	0.4 (32.7)
Source: India Meteorological Department

== Demographics ==
Historical population
Year	Pop.	±%
1891	46,700	—
1901	45,600	−2.4%
1911	46,000	+0.9%
1941	59,600	+29.6%
1951	89,600	+50.3%
1961	111,100	+24.0%
1968	133,400	+20.1%
1971	162,900	+22.1%
1981	229,800	+41.1%
1991	308,600	+34.3%
2001	389,438	+26.2%
2011	451,100	+15.8%

Religion in Udaipur City (2011)
Religion	Percent
Hinduism	72.90%
Islam	15.67%
Jainism	9.86%
Sikhism	0.8%
Christianity	0.63%
Other or not stated	0.14%
Distribution of religions

According to the 2011 census, the total population of Udaipur city was 451,100. Including suburbs outside the city limits the population was 474,531. As per the data, the male population of the city was 233,959 and the female population was 217,141 in 2011. The total population for the age group of 0–6 years old was 47,932. The sex-ratio of the city was 928. The child sex-ratio (0–6 years of age) was 866.

As per the estimated 2019 population data, the total population of Udaipur is 662,992. In recent years, the population growth of Udaipur has increased amazingly due to its weather, relaxing environment and wonderful places to visit nearby.

Udaipur has an average effective literacy rate of 90.43 percent, as compared to the national average of 74.04 percent: male literacy rate being 95.41 percent while the female literacy rate being 85.08 percent.

Languages of Udaipur (2011)
1. Hindi (54.8%)
2. Mewari (23.0%)
3. Rajasthani (11.4%)
4. Urdu (3.87%)
5. Sindhi (2.97%)
6. Others (3.97%)

Hindi and Mewari are the major languages spoken in Udaipur. Marwari, Wagdi, Urdu and Gujarati are some others which are in use in the city. Hindi is spoken by 54.77%, 23.03% Mewari, 11.39% Rajasthani, 3.87% Urdu and 2.97% Sindhi as their first language.

Hinduism is the major religion followed in the city, with 72.9% of the city's population being Hindu. Muslims come second at 15.6%. The city also has a large Jain community. Jains makes nearly 10% of the population of Udaipur, as compared to the national average of 0.37%.

== Government ==
Udaipur is governed by the Udaipur Municipal Corporation. The corporation has 70 municipal wards and Govind Singh Tak is the mayor. The city had a city council that was converted into a municipal corporation in 2013.

Recently, an all-woman police patrol team was deployed in Udaipur. The initiative, taken by the Rajasthan government, is aimed at ensuring the security of women from eve-teasers, and for the general safety of the public, especially tourists. The team is fully equipped with arms, security equipment, first aid and other amenities besides motorcycles for patrolling the city.

Udaipur has its own constituency for representation in the Lok Sabha. The current representative of Udaipur is Mannalal Rawat of the BJP.

Udaipur has two legislative assembly seats: Udaipur City and Udaipur Rural. The current representative of Udaipur City is Tarachand Jain and current representative of Udaipur Rural is Phool Singh Meena ,both are from BJP.

== Economy ==
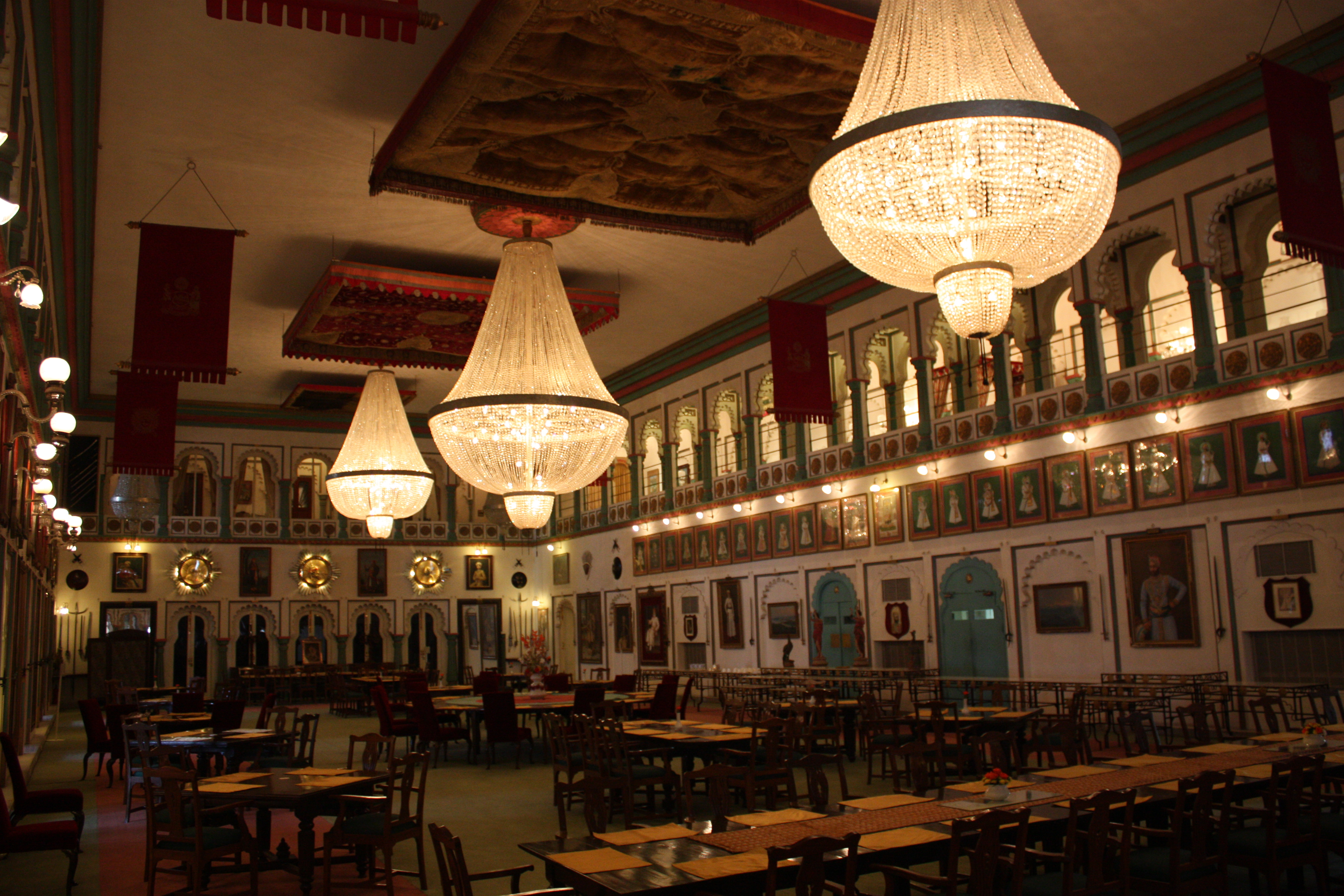
The Durbar Hall, Fateh Prakash Palace Hotel

Udaipur has a diversified economic base. The major contributions to the city's economy come from tourism, agriculture and mineral industries. The handicraft and cottage industry sectors play an important part in contributing to the growing economy. The city has also been included under the Smart Cities mission initiated by the Government of India, and is selected in the list of first 20 cities to be developed as smart cities. In the 2001 census of India, 36% of Udaipur resident was reported to be meaningfully employed.

Handicrafts

Udaipur is well known for handicrafts such as paintings, marble articles, silver arts and terracotta. The Shilpgram is a platform where regional handicraft and hand-loom products are developed. Craft bazaars are organised by the Shilpgram, with an aim to encourage the regional arts and crafts, the handicraft and hand-loom works.

Tourism

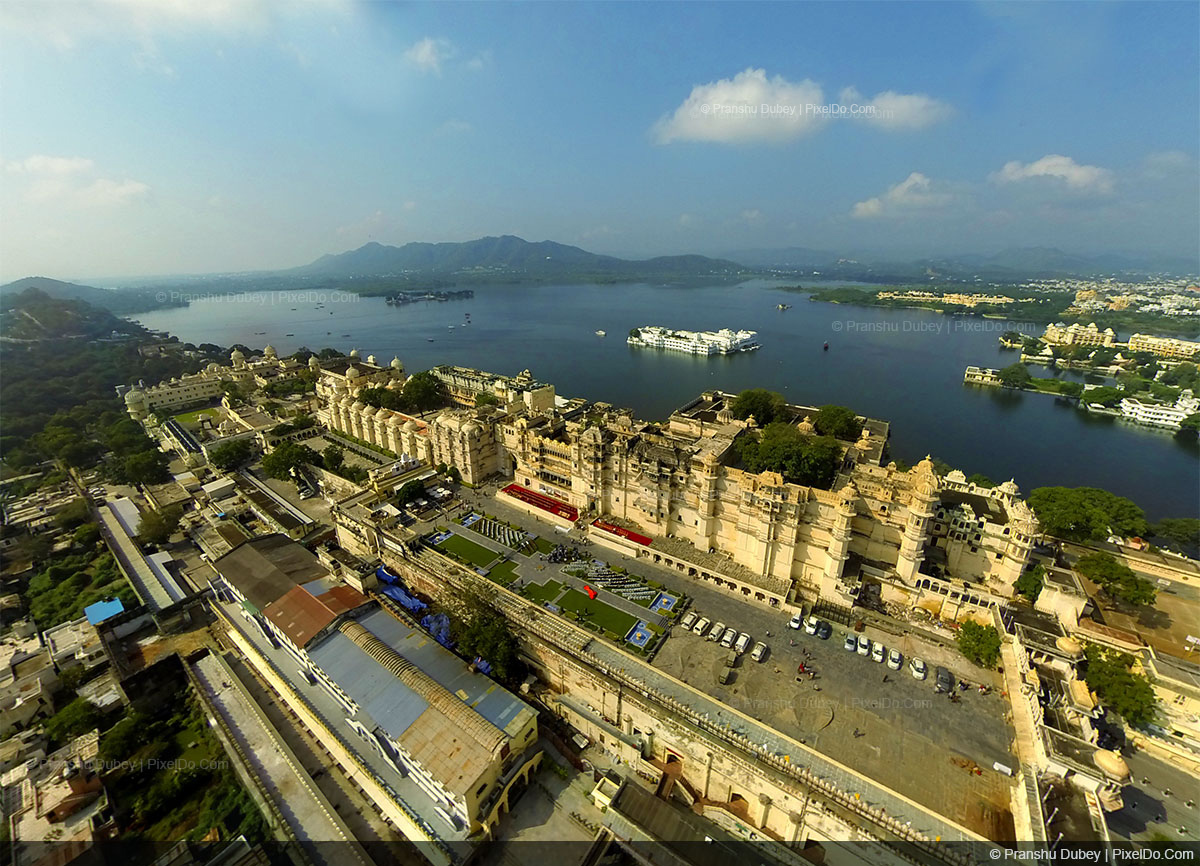
Aerial view of City Palace on Lake Pichola

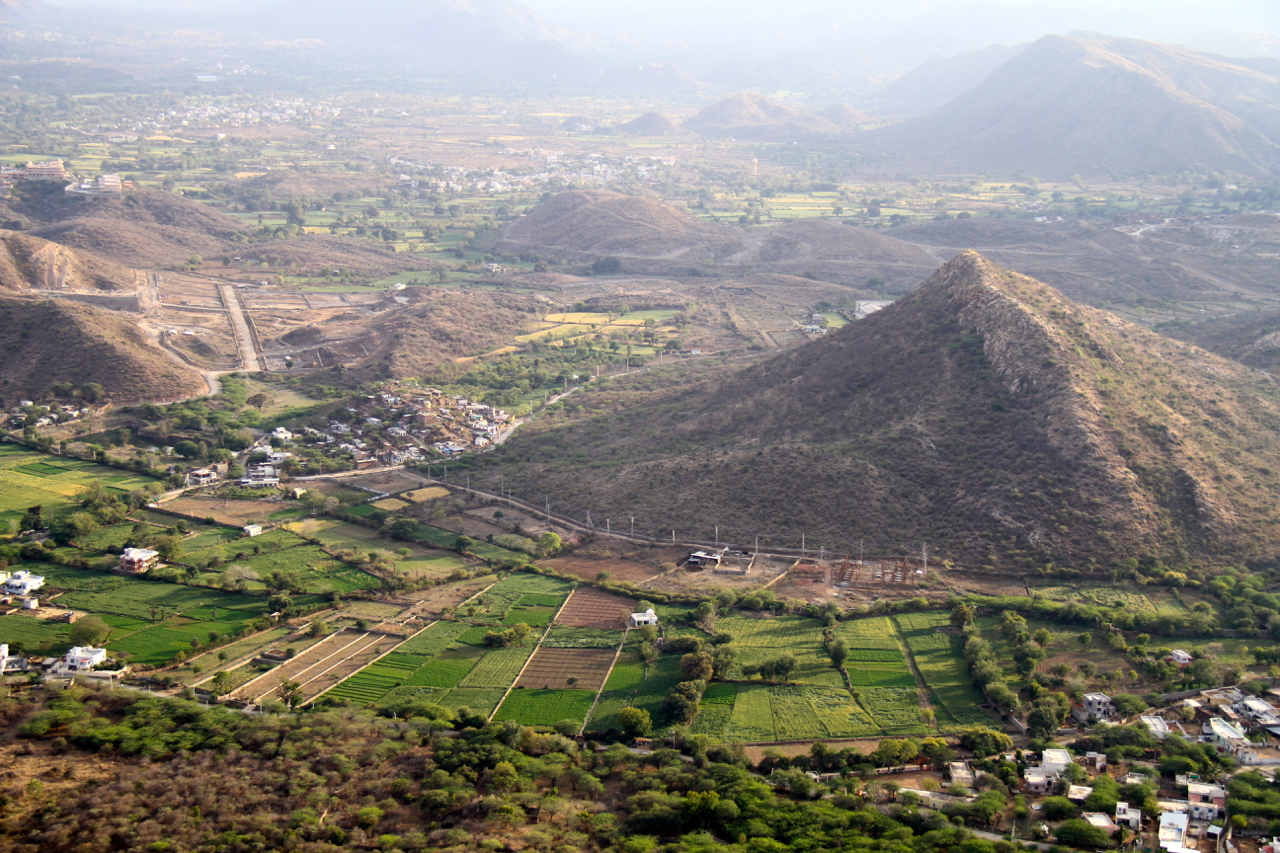
Farming lands amongst the Aravalli hills

Udaipur, with its lakes, and historic palaces and architecture, is a major destination for tourists, both domestic and foreign nationals visiting the state. Over 1.4 million tourists visited Udaipur in 2016. With numerous hotels to serve visiting tourists, Udaipur is home to some of the country's most popular luxury hotels and resorts. The Oberoi Udaivilas has been ranked as the world's number 1 hotel in 2015. The Taj Lake Palace and the Leela Palace Udaipur are also amongst the most expensive hotels in the country. With various other renowned hotel chains present in the city, the tourism sector has been a fairly large contributor to the economic growth and fame of Udaipur.

Metals and Minerals industries

Udaipur district is particularly rich in mineral resources as a large variety of important minerals are found here. Copper, lead, zinc and silver, industrial minerals like phosphate, asbestos, calcite, limestone, Talc (soapstone), barites, wollastonite and marble are the major driving resources behind the industries based in the city. Marble is exclusively mined, processed and exported from here around the world. The marble industry is well set and established with proper infrastructure and technological support for mining and processing. It is the largest sector giving employment to many people in the city and the immigrants from nearby areas. Udaipur is also home to the world's second largest Zinc producer, Hindustan Zinc.

=== Electronics design and manufacturing ===
Udaipur is host to medium and large enterprises designing and manufacturing electronic instruments, control panels, sensitive metering technology and LED lamps. The electrical and electronics industry in Udaipur employs over 6,000 people. These businesses are Tempsens, Pyrotech and Secure Meters Ltd. Secure Meter Limited is one of the major meter manufacturers across the globe.

Agriculture

Agriculture as in most other parts of the country, remains a leading sector in the city's economy. The Major crops of the area are Maize and Jowar in Kharif season and Wheat and Mustard in the Rabi season. Pulses, groundnut and vegetables like brinjals, tomato, bottlegaurd are some of the major food products grown in the city. The Maharana Pratap University of Agriculture and Technology, along with its affiliated institutions, has been working towards identifying, designing, preparing and adapting new techniques in the field of production technology for agricultural development since its establishment.

== Tourism ==
=== List ===
Picture	Attraction	Period	Description
	City Palace, Udaipur	1559	Standing on the east bank of Lake Pichola is a massive series of palaces built at different times from 1559. Its main entrance is through the triple-arched gate - the Tripolia, built in 1725. This gate leads to a series of courtyards, overlapping partitions, terraces, corridors and gardens. The palace now houses a museum with many antique articles, paintings, decorative furniture and utensils from the royal era.
	Lake Palace	1743–1746	Situated over an island in Lake Pichola, the Lake Palace was constructed to serve as a royal summer palace. Built of white marble, the palace is now a luxury 5 star hotel, operating under the "Taj Hotels Resorts and Palaces" banner.
	Jag Mandir	1551–1652	Jag Mandir is a palace built on an island in the Lake Pichola. Also known as the "Lake Garden Palace", it was constructed by three Maharanas of the Mewar kingdom. The construction started in 1551 and was completed by 1652. The royal family used the palace as a summer resort and pleasure palace.
	Kesariyaji Temple	9th century	Kesariyaji, is a prominent Jain pilgrimage site associated with the Digambara tradition. The temple is dedicated to Lord Adinath (Rishabhdev), whose dark-stone Mulnayak idol is depicted in padmāsana with an Ashtadhatu parikara featuring Digambara Tirthankaras in khadgāsana. According to the Digambara tradition, the rear panel depicts Queen Marudevi’s sixteen dreams, alongside representations of the 24 Tirthankaras and additional seated figures. Historical accounts connect its administration with Digambara Bhattarakas of Kashta Sangh and Mula Sangh.
	Monsoon Palace and Sajjangarh Biological Park	-	The Monsoon Palace, also known as Sajjan Garh Palace, was built as an astronomical center to keep track of the movement of monsoon clouds in the area and also served as the summer resort of the Maharanas. Built with white marble, it is located on the Bansdara peak of the Aravalli hill range at an elevation of 944 m (3100 ft) above mean sea level. The palace has a view of the city's lakes, palaces, and surrounding countryside. Beneath the Monsoon Palace, the Sajjangarh Biological Park opened in 2004–2005. This park has many varieties of animals and birds brought from different parts of the world.
	Jagdish Temple	1651	The Jagdish Temple is a large Hindu temple in the middle of Udaipur, built by Maharana Jagat Singh I. A key tourist place in the city, this temple is an example of Māru-Gurjara architecture.
	Eklingji	8th century	The Eklingji Temple, dedicated to Lord Shiva and located 25 kilometers from Udaipur, is one of the most important Hindu pilgrimage sites in Rajasthan. The temple, which is located in the town of Eklingji (Kailashpuri), is the source of the place's common name. The temple's Shikhar towers 50 feet above the ground and has a circumference of 60 feet. A statue of Nandi (bull) facing the deity may be seen on each of the four entrances to the sanctum sanctorum, which has four doors in each of the four directions. It is adorned with a black stone Shiva Lingam with five faces. The ancient temple, which is more than 1300 years old, has a large campus with up to 72 holy sites, including Samadhis, maths, and temples, spread throughout it.
	Fateh Sagar Lake	1678	Lake Fatehsagar is an artificial lake situated in the north-west part of Udaipur. The lake was originally built by Maharana Jai Singh and later reconstructed and extended by Maharana Fateh Singh. It also houses an aquarium named 'Under the Sun' inaugurated in 2017.
	Sukhadia Circle	1968	Sukhadia Circle (square) is large roundabout in the city's northern suburb and is a recreational centre. The square has in its centre, a small pond amidst which lies a 21 ft high three-tiered fountain. The fountain, made of marble is surmounted by a wheat-ear motif, a symbol of prosperity.
	Saheliyon-ki-Bari	1710–1734	Sahelion ki Bari is a garden and tourist space in the northern part of the city. The garden with its fountains and kiosks, a lotus pool and marble elephants, was laid for a group of forty-eight young women attendants who accompanied a princess to Udaipur as part of her dowry.
	Lake Pichola	1362	Lake Pichola is an artificial freshwater lake and is one of the several contiguous lakes in the city of Udaipur. The lake's surroundings and the several islands within the lake have been developed over the centuries, with palaces, marble temples, family mansions, bathing ghats (Gangaur Ghat, Ambrai Ghat, Hanuman Ghat) and chabutaras (a raised platform, normally within a courtyard).
	Moti Magri	-	Moti Magri or Pearl Hill, is a memorial of the Rajput hero Maharana Pratap. Essentially a small hill, atop of which there is a bronze statue of the Maharana astride his favourite horse, Chetak. It was initiated by Maharana Bhagwat Singh Mewar, and carried over and completed with the help of public trust.
	Neemach Mata Temple and ropeway	22 January 2024	Neemach Mata Temple is believed to be more than 500 years old and is located on a hill near the Fateh Sagar Lake. The temple is 900 meters above on the top of the hill. This location provides a complete view of Udaipur. A gondola lift allows access to the temple. The ropeway was built by Damodar ropeways and Infra limited. The ride offers views of the lakes, city and the surrounding hills. The Ropeway Station also offers massage chairs, traditional costume photography and has started "Yoga with a View" sessions for locals and tourists from 1 December 2024.
	Karni Mata, Udaipur	-	Karni mata temple is located at Doodh Talai near Pichola. There is a rope-way which takes visitors to a hill at which this temple is located. There are views of Pichola Lake, Jag Mandir and Doodh Talai. From the top one can view the whole city.
	Pratap Gaurav Kendra	-	Pratap Gaurav Kendra Rashtriya Tirtha is situated at Tiger Hill. It was started by the Veer Shromani Maharana Pratap Samiti, and aims at providing information about Maharana Pratap and the historical heritage of the area with the help of modern technology.
	Gulab Bagh and Zoo	-	Gulab Bagh is the largest garden in Udaipur, situated at heart of the city. It is known for a wide variety plantation and includes various attractions including ponds, a library, toy train, zoological park, temples and a religious place for Arya Samaj, as well as several government offices.
	Pratap Park	2016	Pratap Park is a garden situated near the bank of Pichola Lake. It has an open gymnasium and several other attractions. It has gained attraction due to the human-sized alphabets reading "I LOVE UDAIPUR", with a view of Lake Pichola and City Palace in the background.
	Udaisagar Lake	1565	Udai Sagar Lake is one of the five striking lakes situated in Udaipur. Located about 13 kilometres to the east of Udaipur, the construction of this lake was started in 1559 by Maharana Udai Singh. The lake is actually a result of a dam being built on the river Berach to supply adequate water to the Maharana's kingdom. Udai Sagar Lake is 4 km in length, 2.5 kilometres in width and about 9 meters at its deepest.
	Shilpgram		Shilpgram is a rural arts and crafts complex, situated 3 km (1.9 mi) west Udaipur.

== Culture ==
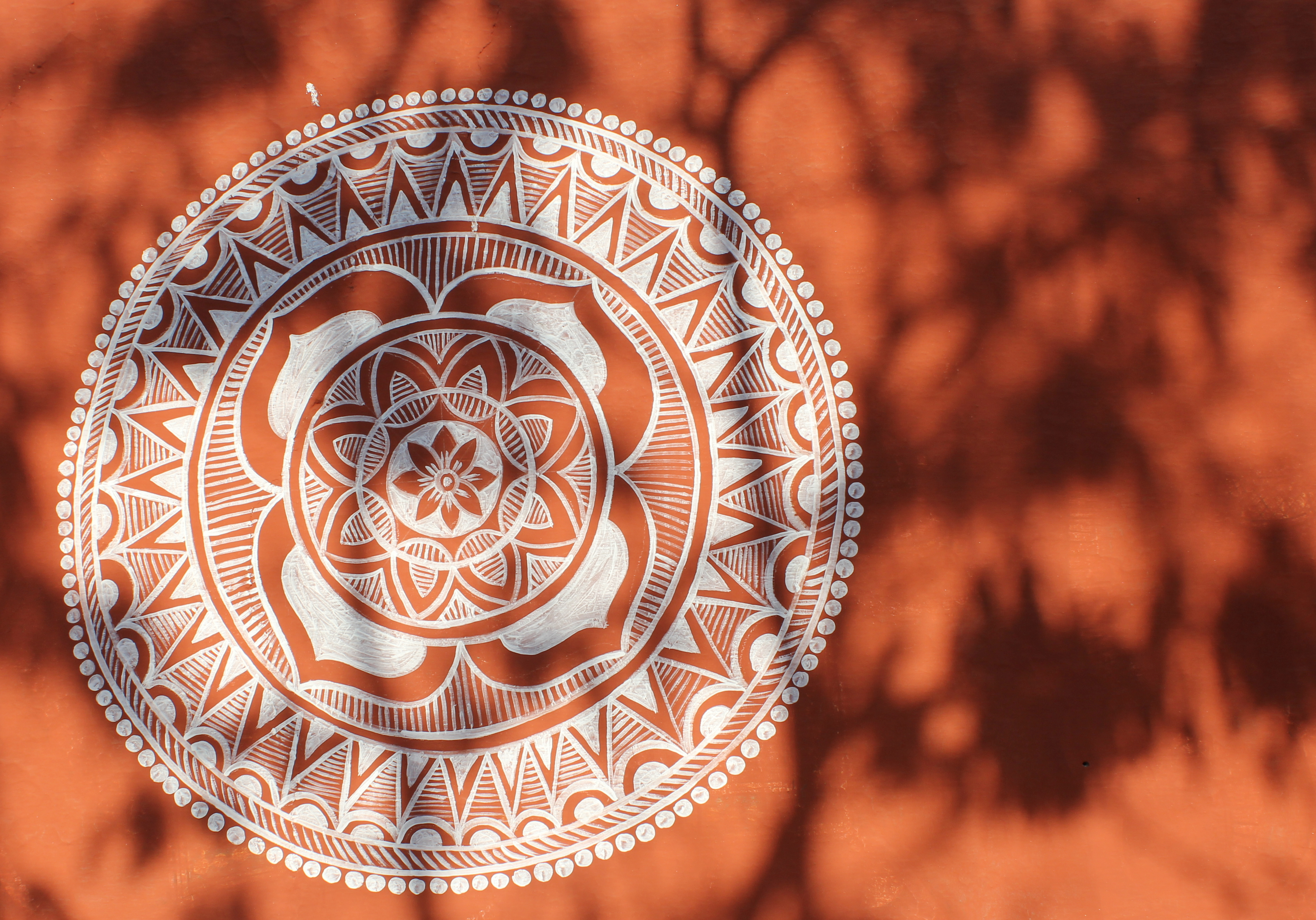
Wall painting at Shilpgram, Udaipur

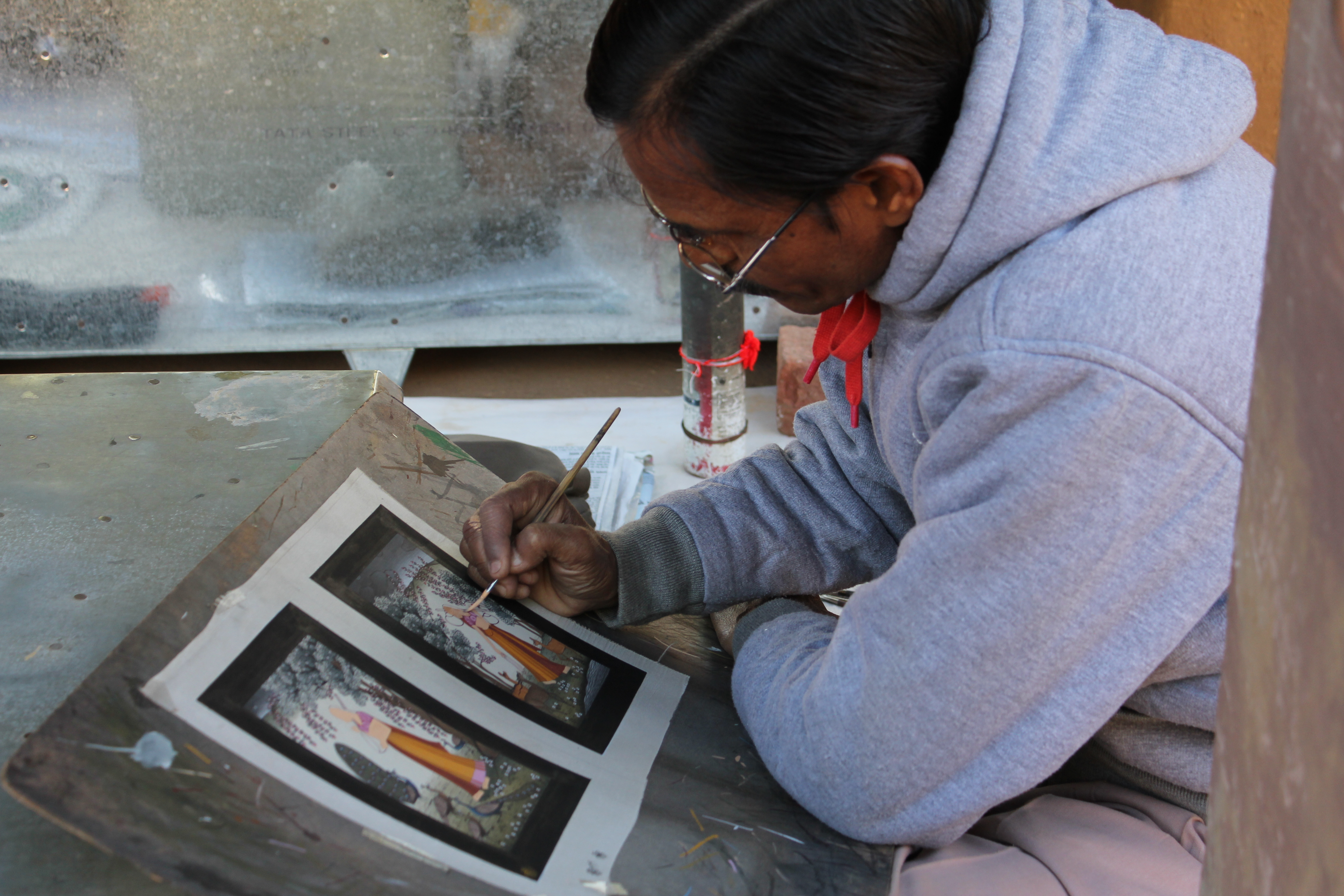
Mewari artist at work

Udaipur has a rich cultural heritage from the past e.g. lakes, temples, huge forts, and palaces. The city has kept a balance between preserving the rituals and traditions of the past while keeping up with the modern advancements and changes in lifestyle{citation needed}. Like any other place in the state of Rajasthan, folk dance and music have an important place in adding to the city's cultural richness. The dynamic and vibrant dances of Bhavai, Ghoomar, Kachchhi Ghodi, Kalbeliya, and Terahtaali add a sparkle to the rich cultural heritage of Udaipur.

- Ghoomar dance is a part of the Hindu culture of the Mewar Region of Rajasthan. This is a community dance for women and performed on auspicious occasions where the ladies move in circles.
- Kalbelia, one of the most sensuous dance forms of Rajasthan, is performed by the Kalbeliya snake charmers' community with the Sapera dancers wearing long, black skirts embroidered with silver ribbons.
- Bhavai dance consists of veiled women dancers balancing up to seven or nine brass pitchers as they pirouette and then swaying with the soles of their feet on the top of a glass or on the edge of the sword.
- Kachchhi Ghodi dance is performed on dummy horses where men in elaborate costumes ride the decorated dummy horses. Holding swords, these dancers move to the beating of drums and fifes.

Following a lineage of traditions and religious significance, the various dances complement the fairs and festivals held in the city. The music consists mainly of the use of morchang, naad, tanpura, and sarangi, among many other instruments.

Miniature paintings are amongst the most famous paintings developed under the patronage of the rulers of Rajasthan. The simplest among these are done on walls, and through folk in style, they nevertheless have some of the flavors of frescoes one sees in the old palaces. The tradition of painting the wall of houses with scenes from mythological and chivalric tales has been prevalent in Rajasthan for the past many centuries {citation needed}. The people of the city make use of such wall paintings for decorations during wedding celebrations. Noted amongst the miniature style of paintings are particularly the Pichvais, which are those made on cloth, and phad, made on cloth scroll in a folk style.

The Bharatiya Lok Kala Mandal is a cultural institution based in the city. The institute with its museum is a platform that displays a collection of Rajasthani culture. Offering an insight into the lifestyle of the royal era in Udaipur, the museum has a collection of dresses, tribal jewelry, turbans, dolls, masks, musical instruments, paintings, and puppets. With various cultural events including folk song and dance performances, theatre and puppetry, the institute highlights the different social stigmas, thereby proving to be a powerful education tool for the masses.

=== Festivals ===
==== Gangaur Festival ====
Gangaur is one of the most important local Hindu festivals in Rajasthan. In some form or the other it is celebrated all over Rajasthan. "gan" is a synonym for Shiva and "Gauri" or "gaur" stands for Hindu Goddess Parvati, the wife of Shiva. Gangaur celebrates the marriage and is a symbol of conjugal and marital happiness.

It is celebrated in the month of Chaitra (March–April), the first month of the Hindu calendar. This month marks the end of winter and the onset of spring. This festival is celebrated by women, who worship clay idols of "Gan" & "Gauri" in their houses. These idols are worshiped by the girls who seek the blessings of Gan and Gauri for a good husband, while the married women pray for the good health and long life of their husbands. On the eve of the Gangaur festival, women decorate their palms and fingers with henna. Udaipur has a Ghat named after Gangaur. Gangaur Ghat or Gangori Ghat is situated on the waterfront of Lake Pichola. This ghat serves as a location for the celebration of some festivals, including the Gangaur festival. The idols of Gan and Gauri are immersed in the Lake Pichola from this ghat.

A traditional procession of Gangaur starts from the City Palace which passes through the city. The procession is headed by old palanquins, chariots, bullock carts, and performance by folk artists.

==== Shilpgram Utsav ====
Shilpgram, a crafts village 3 km west of Lake Fateh Sagar, has displays of traditional houses from Rajasthan, Gujarat, Goa and Maharashtra. There are also demonstrations by musicians, dancers, or artisans from these states. The 10-day festival organized here is a treat for the visitor to an array of exquisite art and craft. One of the important objectives of the Shilpgram festival is in the sphere of increasing awareness and knowledge of rural life and crafts, specifically, for the younger generation. Special emphasis is laid on workshops for children on arts, crafts, theatre, and music.

==== Hariyali Amavasya ====
Hariyali Amavasya (new moon day of the Sawan / Shravan month) marks the beginning of the monsoons and greenery. It arrives three days before the famous Hartalika Teej (Shravan Shukla Tritiya). People worship God Shiva for abundant rains and good agricultural season. Melas and fests are arranged in several places in the city.

==== Jagannath Rath Yatra ====
In Udaipur, the third biggest Ratha-Yatra is organized on the auspicious day of Ashadh Shukla Paksha (bright fortnight) Dwitiya according to Indian Vikram Samvat. On this cultural day of summer solstice theme, 21 June of every year, the journey of the Hindu god Jagannath to aunt's house is started. The presiding Hindu gods of the temple Jagannath (Krishna), Balabhadra (Balarama) and their sister Subhadra are taken through the streets in decorated wooden chariots, which are made annually. The Chariot of Hindu god Jagannath, called Nandighosha, has 16 wheels and is covered in red and yellow.

For many Hindus, the sanctity of the festival is that a touch of the chariot or pulling ropes is considered to give the results of several pious actions or penance for ages.

==== Jal-Jhulni Ekadashi ====
According to the Hindu calendar, Gyaras, or Ekadashi is basically, the 11th day of each waxing (Shukla paksha ) and waning moon (Krishna paksha). This Ekadashi, known as Jal-Jhulni Gyaras, or Jal-Jhulni Ekadashi, like all other festivals, is celebrated with enthusiasm.

Durga Puja

Sharadiya Durga Puja was started at Udaipur city in year 1956 by Nripendralal Bhattacharya (Principal of Udaipur Law College Sukhadiya University & Supreme Court Lawyer) at his residence Bindu Bhawan 49 Shastri Marg Udaipur. Durga Puja is celebrated from sixth day of Navratri till Vijaya Dashmi. Sculptor arrives at Udaipur from West Bengal every year to make idol of Goddess Durga. This idols are made with bio degraded material like bamboo, dry grass, soil, rope of coconut bark etc. Goddess Durga idol symbolise divine energy, protection and feminine strength, courage, triumph of good over evil. This celebration is seamlessly celebrated for seven decades with zeal and devotion at Bindu Bhawan in city of lakes Udaipur. Evening Aarti is mesmerising here.Nowadays Durga Puja is celebrated at several other places across the Udaipur city.

== Udaipur in popular culture ==
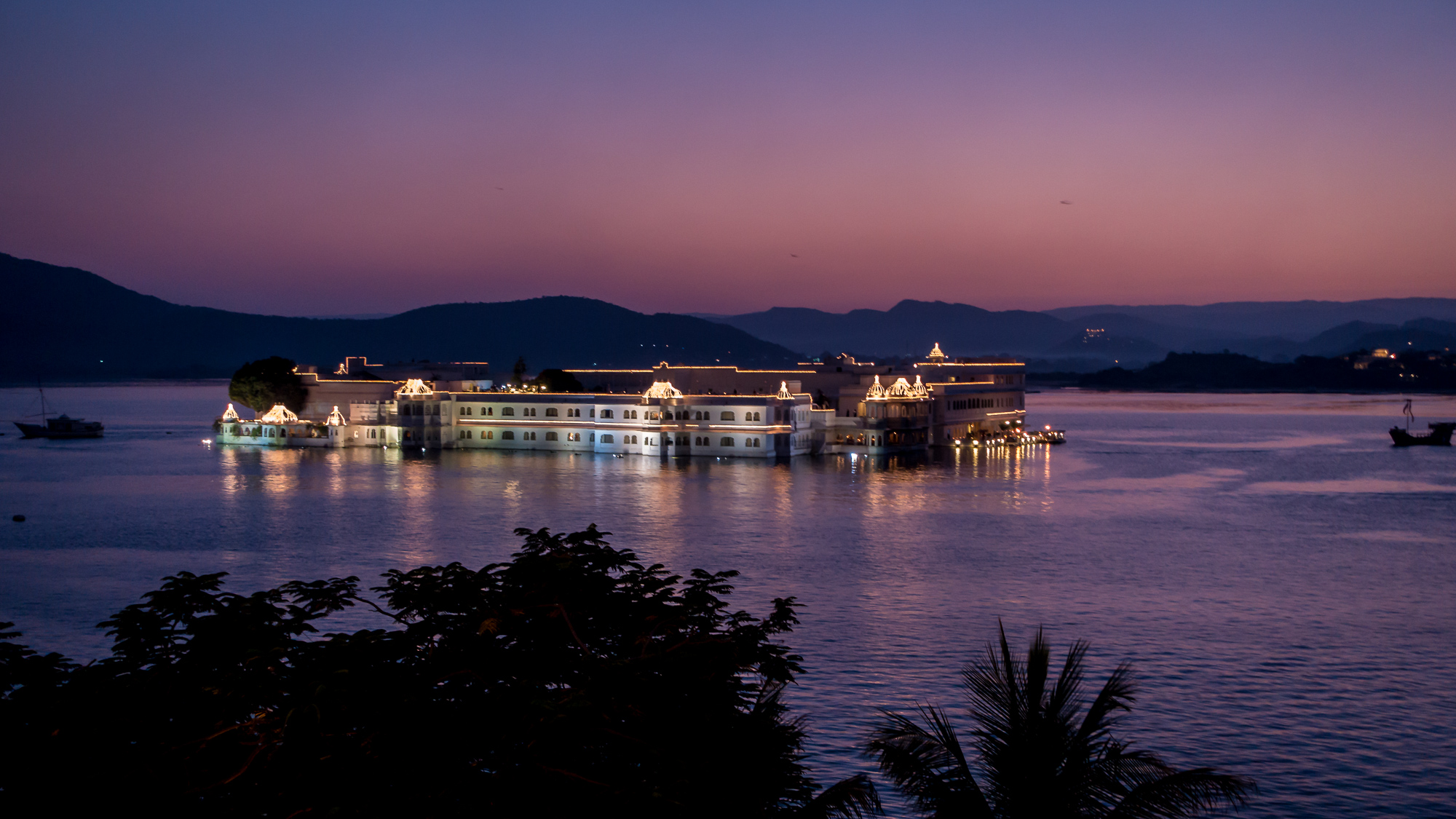
Udaipur's Lake Palace at dusk

Udaipur was voted the Best City in the World in 2009 by the Travel + Leisure magazine, and is a known wedding destinations for Indian as well as foreign nationals. The city is a blend of sights, sounds and experiences, which have made it one of the top destinations for weddings and celebrations.

Movies and Television

Udaipur is mentioned under the spelling Oodeypore in Rudyard Kipling's The Jungle Book as the birthplace of Bagheera, the fictional panther in the king's Menagerie.

Because of its scenic locations, Udaipur has been the shooting location for many Hollywood and Bollywood movies. Indian sections of the James Bond film Octopussy were filmed in the city, the Lake Palace, and the Monsoon Palace. The nearby desert was the backdrop of the remarkable rescue of Octopussy (Maud Adams) by Bond (Roger Moore). Some scenes from the British television series The Jewel in the Crown were also filmed in Udaipur. The Disney channel film, The Cheetah Girls One World, was shot in Udaipur in January 2008. Some of the other non-Indian movies and TV shows filmed in Udaipur include: Darjeeling Limited, Opening Night, Heat and Dust, Indische Ring, Inside Octopussy, James Bond in India, The Best Exotic Marigold Hotel, Gandhi, and The Fall. Jag Mandir, a documentary film directed for television by Werner Herzog in 1991, was also filmed in the city.

Udaipur has been a location for a number of Bollywood movies. Some of them shot here include: Dhadak, Guide, Mera Saaya, Phool Bane Angaray, Kachche Dhaage, Mera Gaon Mera Desh, Jalmahal, Yaadein, Return of the thief of the bagdad, Eklavya: The Royal Guard, Dhamaal, Jis Desh Mei Ganga Rehta Hai, Chalo Ishq Ladaaye, Fiza, Gaddaar, Hum Hain Rahi Pyar Ke, Khuda Gawah, Kundan, Nandini, Saajan Ka Ghar, Yeh Jawaani Hai Deewani, Pataakha, Mirzya, Goliyon Ki Raasleela Ram-Leela, Prem Ratan Dhan Payo, Love Aaj Kal, Angrezi Medium. Udaipur is also the setting of various Television series like Yeh Rishta Kya Kehlata Hai, Rakhi Ka Swayamwar and Bharat Ka Veer Putra – Maharana Pratap.

Events

Udaipur is a destination for organising various national and international cultural events. Recently, Udaipur hosted the first edition of India's first World Music Festival, a two-day festival held on 13 and 14 February 2016. Performances were made by artists and musicians from more than 12 countries, including Spain, Ghana, Venezuela, Italy, France as well as India. Udaipur is also the host for the Udaipur Lake Festival, a cultural event organized by the Udaipur Municipal Corporation. In this festival, Musical programs, adventure sports, jungle safari, bird watching, light and sound shows, art fair etc. are held around the lakes during the three to four day period.

Udaipur is also the host city for the first ASEAN Art camp being organised by the union ministry of external affairs from 21–29 September. There are total of 10 countries included and are taking part in the event: Indonesia, Singapore, Malaysia, Philippines, Brunei, Thailand, Cambodia, Myanmar, Vietnam, and India. This 10-day long art camp acts as a platform for cultural and artistic exchange among the participating countries.

== Transport ==
Udaipur is well connected to the major cities of India by land, rail, and air.

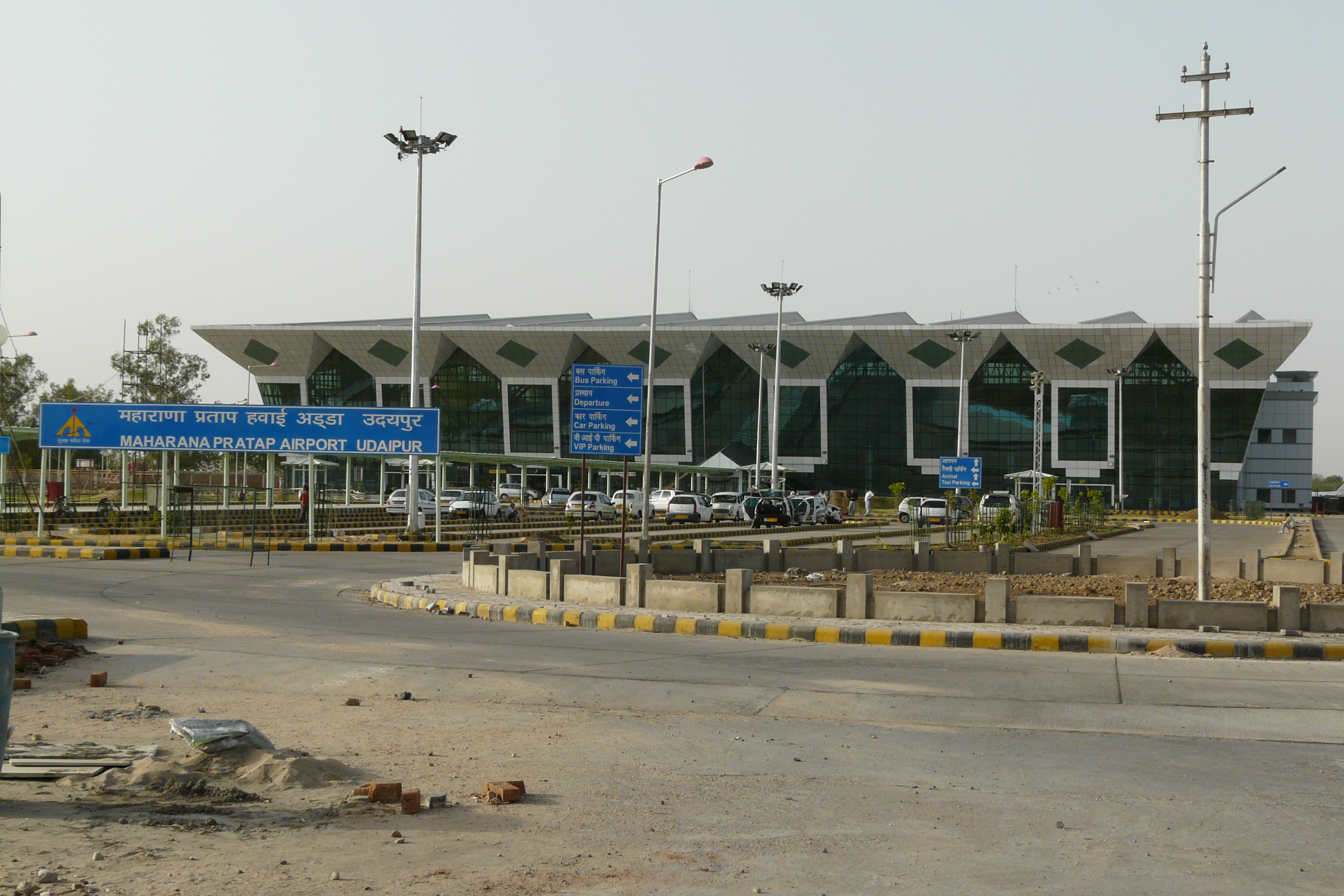
Maharana Pratap Airport

Air

Maharana Pratap Airport, is a small domestic airport situated in a satellite town about 20 kilometres from Udaipur. Daily flights connect Udaipur with Jaipur, Mumbai, Delhi, Chennai, Aurangabad, Bangalore, Hyderabad, Surat and Varanasi. Air India, Vistara, IndiGo and SpiceJet are operational at present.

Rail

Udaipur City railway station and Rana Pratap Nagar railway station are two railway stations in Udaipur. Through them, Udaipur has direct train connectivity on the broad gauge network to most of the major cities in Rajasthan and the rest of India such as Mysuru, Bengaluru, Khajuraho, Alwar, Jaipur, Kota, Chittorgarh, Ajmer, Delhi, Mumbai, Kolkata, Ratlam, Patliputra, Indore, Ujjain, Mumbai, Surat, Vadodara, Gwalior and Agra and a broad gauge conversion is completed in October 2022 for Ahmedabad.

Luxurious trains, The Palace on Wheels, Royal Rajasthan on Wheels, Maharaja Express and The Indian Maharaja have Udaipur as the scheduled stop on their itinerary. Trains connecting Udaipur with the Capital of India, Delhi include the Mewar Express and Chetak Express.

Road

The city lies on the intersection point of East West Corridor, Golden Quadrilateral, National Highway (NH) 76 and National Highway (NH) 8, midway between Delhi and Mumbai, located around 700 kilometres from either city. The East West Corridor which starts from Porbandar and ends at Silchar is intersecting the Golden Quadrilateral and shares the common space from Udaipur to Chittor. The roads in this part of the country are paved and fit for private vehicles. One can either drive from Jaipur (around 6 hours), Ahmedabad (4½ hours) or Surat (9 hours) on NH 8 or Golden Quadrilateral, from Kota (3 hours - EW Corridor or NH 76). Udaipur City Bus Depot has lines running for the majority of other destinations in Rajasthan and farther north and west towards Madhya Pradesh and Gujarat. Apart from Rajasthan State Road Transport Corporation (RSRTC), there are numerous private operators and companies providing bus services to and from the other cities.

Local transport

Unmetered taxis, private taxi, radio taxi, auto rickshaws, and regular city bus services are available in the city. Since 2015 Uber and Ola cab services are available.

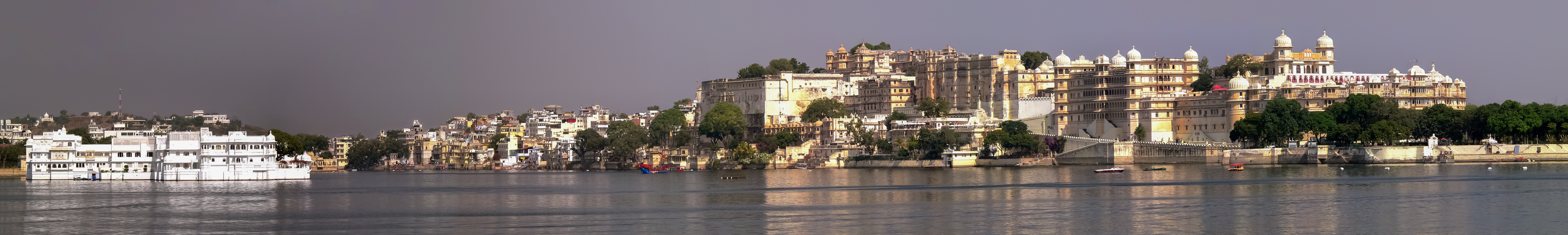
Udaipur Panorama from Jag Mandir Island

== Places nearby ==
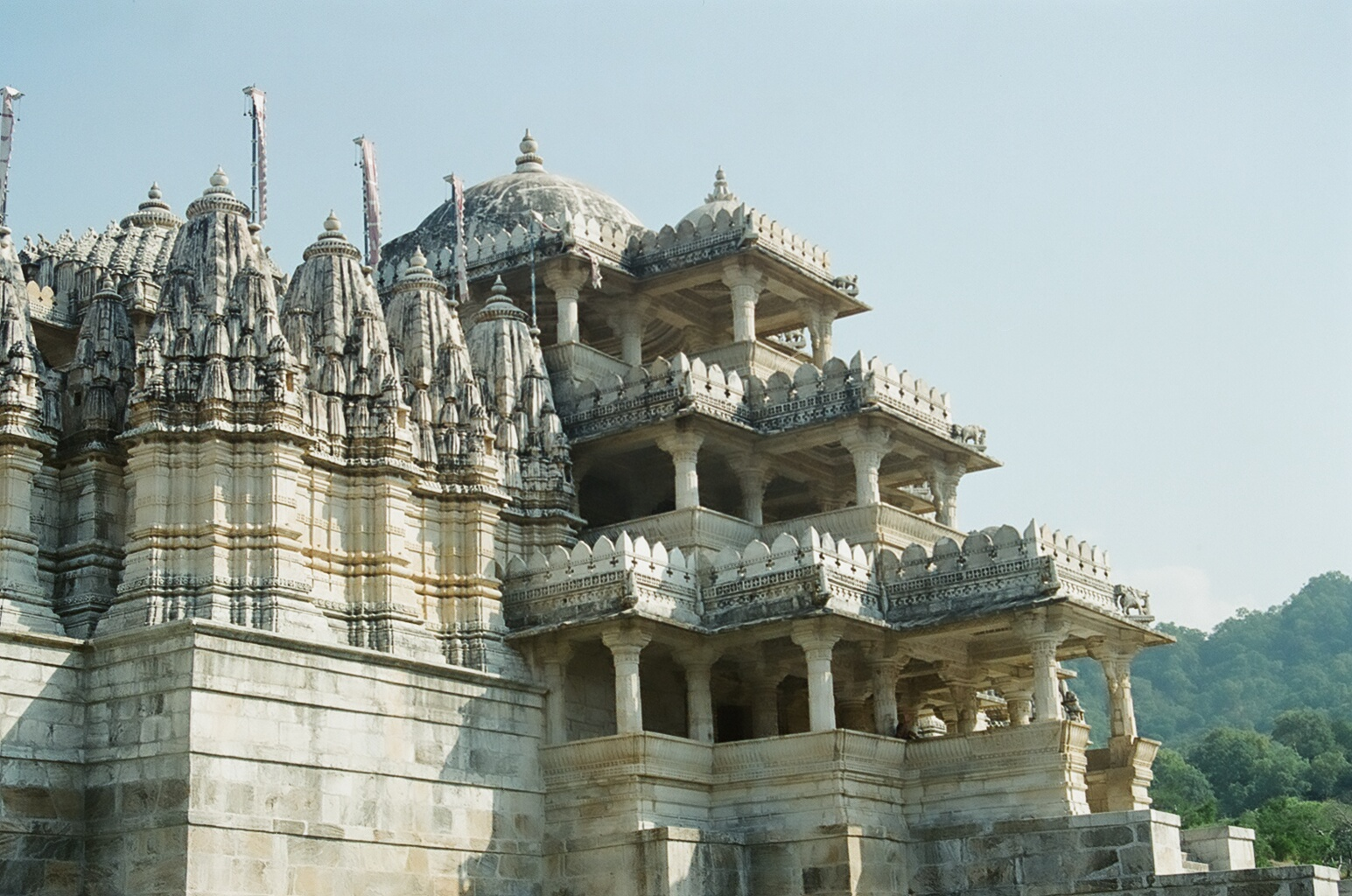
The renowned Jain Temple at nearby Ranakpur

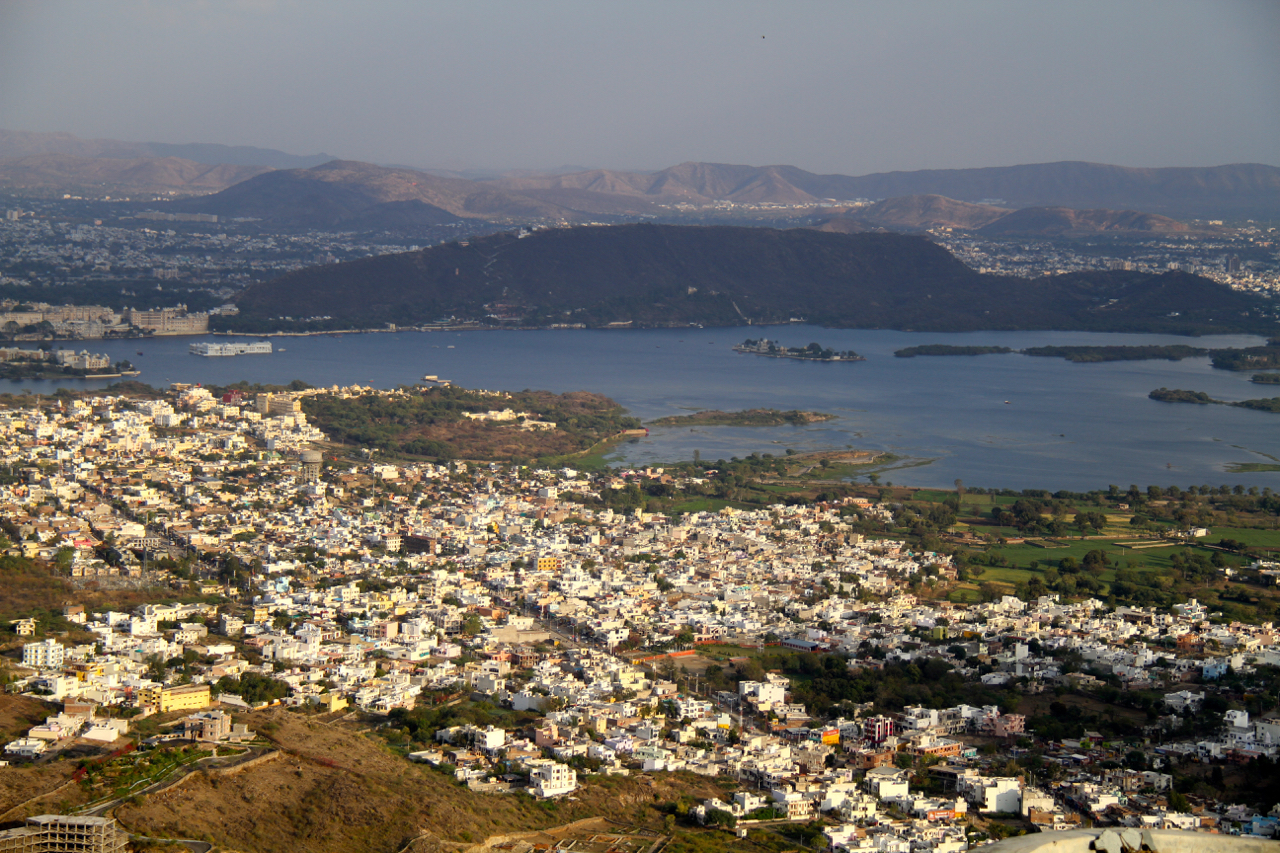
View of Udaipur from the Monsoon Palace

Apart from the local attractions within the city, there are several charming places to see around Udaipur.

List
- Nathdwara
- Ranakpur
- Chittorgarh
- Haldighati
- Kumbhalgarh
- Mount Abu
- Eklingji
- Kumbhalgarh Wildlife Sanctuary
- Kankroli and Rajsamand Lake
- Rishabhdeo
- Jagat
- Jaisamand Lake
- Udaisagar Lake
- Sita Mata Wildlife Sanctuary
- Baneshwar
- Galiakot
- Dungarpur
- Banswara
- Chavand
- Bhinder
- Kanor
- Sanwaliaji Temple
- Avari Mata temple
- Jhakham Dam
- Salumber
- Charbhuja Ji
- Tidi Dam
- Nandeshwar Ji
- Ubeshwar Ji
- Mansi Wakal dam
- Keleshwar Mahadeo
- Jhameshwar Mahadeo
- Vallabhnagar

== Sports ==
Popular sports include cricket, football, hockey, tennis, chess, badminton, archery, etc.

Stadiums

Gandhi Ground is the main sports venue for various events, like athletics, basketball, field hockey, football, Kho Kho and volleyball. Luv Kush Indoor Stadium is generally used for the indoor sports especially Badminton and TT. Maharana Bhupal Stadium is a multi-purpose stadium used for organising matches of football, cricket and other sports. For Encouraging Sports in the city and even for encouraging International Sports in the city, a step has been put forward by establishing 'Khel Gaon (village)'or Maharana Pratap Khel Gaon in Chitrakoot Nagar. It will be committed to 12 sports namely like Basketball, Volleyball, Tennis, Kho-Kho, Kabaddi, Handball, Archery, Rifle shooting, Judo – Karate, Boxing, Swimming, Squash.

Udaipur International Cricket Stadium is a proposed cricket stadium in Udaipur. In 2013, after a dispute between Rajasthan State Sports Council and Rajasthan Cricket Association over the availability of Sawai Mansingh Stadium during the Indian Premier League, the RCA decided to have plans of having their own stadium. RCA has gained land in Udaipur with 9.67 acres from the Udaipur Improvement Trust on a 99-year lease and stadium will have a capacity of 35,000.

Cricket

Udaipur has several cricket clubs and is home to many state-level players. Ashok Menaria of Udaipur has represented India in U-19 Cricket world cup. Ashok Menaria and Dishant Yagnik of the city have played in IPL for Rajasthan Royals. Rajasthan Royals is a team name of one of the IPL Teams.

Chess

Chess is a popular game in the city among both young and senior players. Udaipur has over 120 International FIDE rated chess players. Players from Udaipur have Represented Rajasthan several times in different Nationals such as Arena Grandmaster Chandrajeet Rajawat. Chandrajeet Rajawat has also won Rajasthan State Championship over seven times in different categories. Udaipur also has top FIDE rated players of Rajasthan recognized by AICF. Udaipur is also a favourite destination for chess players. With many international chess events throughout the year, bringing more than 1500 players each year from all over the world to compete.

Water Sports

The city's lakes provide an opportunity for water sports. The nearby Jaisamand Lake, situated about 56 km from the city, is equipped with water sports facilities with a range of different boats available. Kayaking and Canoeing Sports Camps have also been started at the Fateh Sagar Lake. The city also hosted the 2012 National Kayaking and Canoeing Championship with Fateh Sagar Lake serving as the venue.

Powerlifting

The Asian Powerlifting Championships 2016, organised by Indian Powerlifting Federation, and sanctioned by Asian Powerlifting Federation and International Powerlifting Federation, was held in Udaipur from 7 June 2016 to 12 June 2016. The city also served as the venue for the Asian Powerlifting Championships in 2012.

== Education ==
Udaipur is home to various government, deemed and private universities. Mohan Lal Sukhadia University, Maharana Pratap University of Agriculture and Technology and Rajiv Gandhi Tribal University are the major government universities in the city while J.R.N. Rajasthan Vidyapeeth is a deemed university and Pacific University, Bhupal Nobles University and SPSU are amongst leading private universities of repute. The Indian Institute of Management Udaipur, established in 2011, also resides in the city.

== Media ==
Newspapers in Udaipur include Hindi dailies Rajasthan Patrika, Dainik Bhaskar, Navbharat Times, Udaipur Dopahar and Pratahkal. The Times of India, The Economic Times, The Hindustan Times, The Hindu are the English language newspapers circulated in the city.

The national, state-owned All India Radio is broadcast both on the medium wave and FM bands (101.9MHz) in the city. Also broadcast in the city there are four private local FM stations: Radio City FM (91.9MHz), Big FM (92.7MHz), My FM (94.3MHz) and Radio Tadka (95 MHz). The public broadcaster Doordarshan (Prasar Bharati) provides a regional channel besides the mainstay channels.

The city is switching over to digitalisation of cable TV as per the third phase of the digitalisation programme by the Ministry of Information and Broadcasting.

== See also ==
- Chittorgarh
- Maharana Pratap
- Udaipur district
- Udaipur division
- Tourist Attractions in Udaipur
- History of Udaipur
- Mahakaleshwar Temple Udaipur

Tehsils of Udaipur:

- Girwa
- Vallabhnagar
- Mavli
- Jhadol
- Kotra
- Badgaon
- Bhindar
- Gogunda
- Kherwara
- Mavli
- Salumbar
- Vallabhnagar
- Semari
