= Gangaur Ghat =

- Interactive map of Gangaur Ghat
- Coordinates: 24.579947°N 73.6817402°E

Gangaur Ghat or Gangori Ghat is a main ghat situated near the waterfront of Lake Pichola in Udaipur. It is situated near the Jagdish Chowk area. It is known for Bagore Ki Haveli, a popular tourist destination of the city.

== Overview ==
Gangaur Ghat is a popular destination for celebration of a large number of cultural festivals:

=== Gangaur festival ===
Gangaur is one of the most important local festivals in Rajasthan. Traditional processions of Gangaur commences from the City Palace, and several other places, which passes through various areas of the city. The procession is headed by an old palanquins, chariots, bullock carts and performance by folk artistes. After the processions are complete, the idols of Gan and Gauri are brought to this ghat and immersed in the Lake Pichola from here.

=== Jal-Jhulni Ekadashi ===
The Jal-Jhulni Gyaras, or Jal-Jhulni Ekadashi is a popular event celebrated around Gangaur Ghat. On the 11th day of each waxing (Shukla paksha) and waning moon (Krishna paksha), different processions start from the various parts of the city and end at one point i.e. Gangaur Ghat where people swing the idols of Lord Krishna in child form (Baal Gopal) in the Lake Pichola. These procession are called Ram Revdies.

== See also ==
- Udaipur
- Tourist Attractions in Udaipur
- Lake Pichola
- City Palace, Udaipur
- Gangaur
