= International Powerlifting Federation – 1975 World Congress and Championships =

The IPF 1975 World Congress was held on November 21, 1975 in Birmingham Town Hall - Council Chamber in the city of Birmingham (England). The Congress was opened by President Bob Crist, who introduced the head table: Rudy Sablo as parliamentarian timekeeper and Clay Patterson, IPF General Secretary. Rules of the day were Robert's Rules of Order. Voting regulations were announced that each member nation would have only one vote. There were no observers due to limited space and time. Speaking limit was two minutes per speaker and each person could speak only twice on each time.

== Nations in attendance ==
- Australia, delegates: Ron Modra and Yuris Sterns.
- Canada, delegates: William Gvoich and William Jamison.
- Cyprus, delegate: Andreas Savvides.
- Great Britain, delegates: Vic Mercer and Wally Holland.
- India, delegate: Nishith Ganguli.
- Ireland, delegate: Bernard Fennessy.
- Japan, delegate: Shori Watanabe and Noboru Degawa.
- Sweden, delegates: Arnold Bostrom and Henry Attland.
- U.S.A, delegates: Bob Hoffman and Herb Gowing.
- Venezuela, delegate: Miguel Torrealba.
- Zambia, delegates: Charles Madondo and Alan James.

The following guest nations were in attendance:

- Holland, delegate: Adre Volker.
- Luxembourg, delegate: Aimo Kneppe
- Tonga, delegate: John Phillip and Bill Starr.

Others present:

- Bob Crist, President.
- Clay Patterson, Gen. Secretary.
- Rudy Sablo, Records Chamn.
- Frank Lamp, Vice-President.

Also, Mr Savvides of Cyprus stated that he had been authorized to apply on behalf of Greece. The body authorized the secretary to follow up with Greece for future admittance.

== 3rd World Powerlifting Championships ==
The IPF 3rd World Powerlifting Championships were held on November 22 and 23, 1975, in Birmingham Town Hall (England). The following is a List of Competitors:

=== Flyweight ===
- Hideaki Inaba (Japan)
- N. Bhairo (G.B.)
- P. Mackensie (G.B)
- Paul Edom (Australia)
- Wayne Osborne (Canada)
- Haruji Watabe (Japan)
- Juhani Niemi (Finland)

=== Bantamweight ===
- Lamar Gant (USA)
- Ken Thrush (G.B)
- Syalemba (Zambia)
- Maths Johansson (Sweden)
- Carlos Torres (Venezuela)
- Harry Norville (Canada)
- Ed Moules (Canada)
- Yoshio Shimada (Japan)
- V. Issakajnen (Finland)
- Tony Wallece (Ireland)

=== Featherweight ===
- John Ambler (G.B.)
- Ove Nilsson (Sweden)
- Isao Konno (Japan)
- Mwape (Zambia)
- Enrique Hernandez (USA)
- Mauro Di Pasquale (Canada)
- Fumio Seki (Japan)
- Yrjo Haatanen (Finland)

=== Lightweights ===
- R. Casale (Zambia)
- Mike Shaw (G.B)
- Jack Welch (USA)
- Dennis Attland (Sweden)
- Courtney Boyce (Australia)
- Takeo Tanaka (Japan)
- Masayuki Yamamoto (Japan)
- Bjorn Holmsen (Norway)
- Kaare Holte (Norway)
- James Moir (Canada)
- Jim Gallant (Canada)
- Raimo Valineya (Finland)

=== Middleweight ===
- Noboru Degawa (Japan)
- Lars Buckland (Sweden)
- Andreas Savvides (Cyprus)
- Walter Thomas (USA)
- ruce Waddell (Australia)
- Robert Jeha (Australia)
- unnar Skogsatd (Norway)
- Gunnar Lorentzen (Norway)
- Roger Chauvin (Canada)
- Jouko Nyyssonen (Finland)
- J. Chiwanga (Zambia)
- Bernard Fennessy (Ireland)
- Skuli Oskarsson (Iceland)

=== Light Heavies ===
- Cedric Demetrius (Jamaica)
- Lars Bjorck (Sweden)
- Dennis Wright (USA)
- Ron Collins (G.B)
- Norman Jeba (Australia)
- Peter Fiore (Zambia)
- Kazutoshi Kawaguchi (Japan)
- Per Buaroe Kjell (Norway)
- Arne Boe (Norway)
- Claude Dumont (Canada)
- Veli Miattinen (Finland)
- Unto Honkonen (Finland)
- Ron Whiteway (Ireland)

=== Mid Heavyweights ===
- Ray Yvander (Sweden)
- E. Toal (G.B)
- Ronald Modra (Australia)
- Ed Ravenscroft (USA)
- S. Kanada (Zambia)
- Barry O Brien (Jamaica)
- Gunnar Ostby (Norway)
- Ned Gvoich (Canada)
- Norman May (Luxembourg)
