= Kachhwa (Udaipur) =

- Village
- Country: India
- State: Rajasthan
- District: Udaipur

Languages
  - Official: Hindi, Mewari
- Time zone: UTC+5:30 (IST)
- PIN: 313705
- Vehicle registration: RJ-
- Nearest city: Udaipur
- Lok Sabha constituency: Udaipur

Kachhwa is a village in Gogunda Tehsil in Udaipur district in the Indian state of Rajasthan. The District headquarter of the village is Udaipur.

The postal head office of Kachhwa is Badgaon.

== Geography ==
It is 39 kilometers away from the Udaipur district headquarters. It is located on 583 meters above Sea level.
