= Jeerai =

- Village
- Country: India
- State: Rajasthan
- District: Udaipur

Population (2011)
  - Total: 371

Languages
  - Official: Hindi, Mewari
- Time zone: UTC+5:30 (IST)
- PIN: 313705
- Vehicle registration: RJ-
- Nearest city: Udaipur
- Lok Sabha constituency: Udaipur

Jeerai is a village in Gogunda Tehsil in Udaipur district in the Indian state of Rajasthan. The District headquarter of the village is Udaipur.

== Geography ==
It is 42 kilometers away from the Udaipur district headquarters.

== Demographics ==
As per Population Census 2011, the total population of Jeerai is 371. Males constitute 51% of the population and females 49%.

== Literacy ==
The literacy rate of Jeerai village is 50.77% as per 2011 census which is very low compared to 66.11% of Rajasthan.
