= Alsigarh =

Village in Rajasthan, India

Coordinates: 24°28′N 73°35′E

- Village
- Location in Rajasthan, India Alsigarh (India)
- Country: India
- State: Rajasthan
- District: Udaipur
- Tehsil: Girwa

Population (2011)
  - Total: 3,798

Languages
  - Official: Hindi, Mewari
- Time zone: UTC+5:30 (IST)
- PIN: 313031
- Vehicle registration: RJ-
- Nearest city: Udaipur
- Lok Sabha constituency: Udaipur

Alsigarh is a village in Girwa Tehsil in Udaipur district in the Indian state of Rajasthan. It is located on hilly area above 540 meters above the sea level.

== Demographics ==
As of 2011 census total population of Alsigarh is 3,798 out of which 1,899 are males and 1,899 are females.

== Literacy ==
As of 2011, the literacy rate of Alsigarh is 32.6% thus Alsigarh village has lower literacy rate compared to 51.6% of Udaipur district.
