= Lasadiya tehsil =

Tehsil in Salumbar, Rajasthan, India

- Tehsil
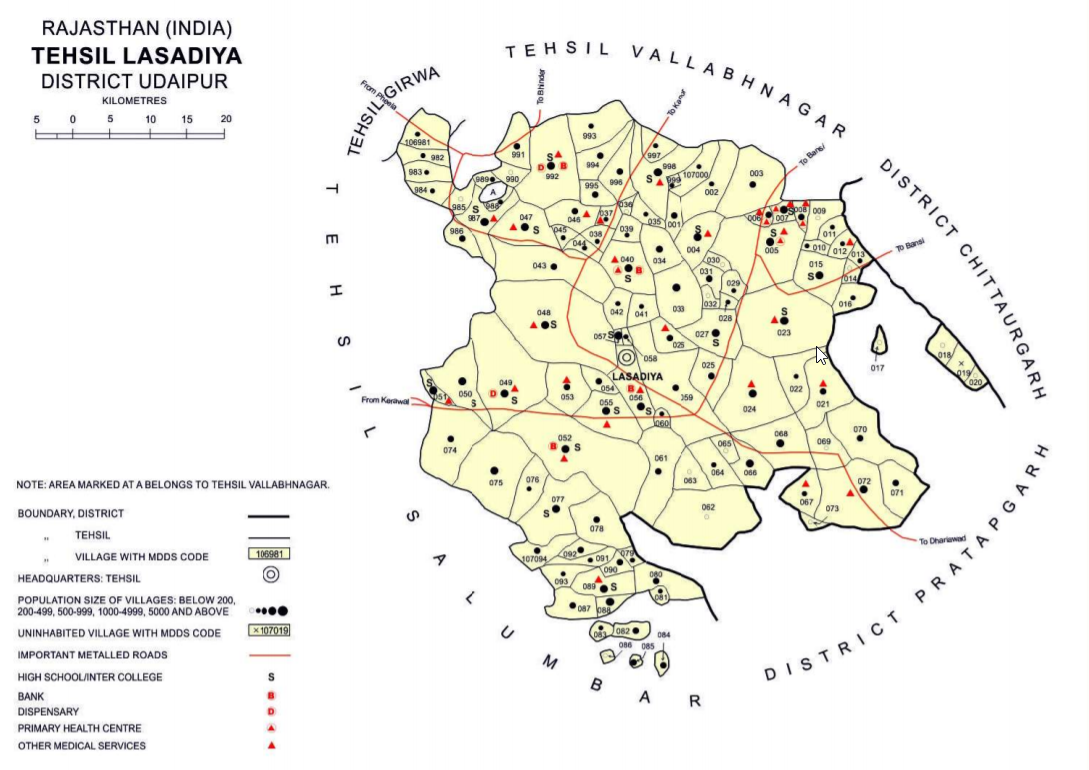
- Lasadiya tehsil

- Location of Lasadiya tehsil Lasadiya tehsil (India)
- Coordinates: 24.243362°N 74.230635°E
- Tehsil seat: Lasadiya

Area
  - Total: 539 km^{2} (208 sq mi)

Population (2011)
  - Total: 91,229
  - Density: 169/km^{2} (438/sq mi)
- Time zone: Indian Standard Time

Lasadiya (also spelt Lasadia) is a tehsil of Salumbar district in Rajasthan, India.The tehsil consists of 114 revenue villages which are organized in 19 gram panchayats The tehsil headquarter is located in the village of Lasadiya. The boundaries of Lasadiya tehsil are conterminous with those of Lasadiya panchayat samiti.

== History ==
Before the formation of the Republic of India, the territory of present-day Lasadiya tehsil was part of the former Udaipur State. With the formation of the United State of Rajasthan (precursor to the state of Rajasthan) in 1948, the new district of Udaipur was constituted which included the area of present-day Lasadiya tehsil. Lasadiya tehsil was created in 2008 by including 19 villages of Salumbar tehsil (of Udaipur district) and 88 villages of Dhariawad tehsil (of Pratapgarh district).

== Geography ==
The area of Lasadiya tehsil is 539 square kilometres. The tehsil is bordered by Girwa tehsil to the northwest, Vallabhnagar tehsil to the north, Chittaurgarh district to the north east, Pratapgarh district to the southeast, and Salumber tehsils to the southwest. The annual average rainfall in Lasadiya tehsil is 692 mm, with an average of 32 rainy days per year.

== Demographics ==
The population of Lasadiya tehsil is 91,229, which makes it the least populous tehsil in Udaipur district. The entire population of Lasadiya is classified as rural in the 2011 census. The sex ratio in the tehsil is 968. 88% of the population belongs to one of the statutorily defined scheduled tribes. The tehsil's literacy rate of 35% is the second lowest in Udaipur district. 96% of the population of the tehsil is rural and the literacy rate of the tehsil is 54%. Mewari is the predominant language used in the tehsil, being the first language for 98% of the population of the tehsil.

Because of its predominant tribal population, Lasadiya tehsil is classified as a Scheduled Area which affords safeguards for interests of the tribal population.

== Economy ==
Agriculture is the most significant sources of income in Lasadiya tehsil with 90% of workers identifying as cultivators or agricultural labourers in the 2011 census.
