= Peepliya =

- Village
- Country: India
- State: Rajasthan
- District: Udaipur

Population (2011)
  - Total: 736

Languages
  - Official: Hindi, Mewari
- Time zone: UTC+5:30 (IST)
- PIN: 313031
- Vehicle registration: RJ-
- Nearest city: Udaipur
- Lok Sabha constituency: Udaipur

Peepliya is a village in Girwa Tehsil in Udaipur district in the Indian state of Rajasthan. As per Population Census 2011, the total population of Peepliya is 736. The District head quarter of the village is Udaipur.
