= Dodawali =

Coordinates: 24°34′N 73°32′E

- Village
- Location in Rajasthan, India Dodawali (India)
- Country: India
- State: Rajasthan
- District: Udaipur

Population (2011)
  - Total: 1,706

Languages
  - Official: Hindi, Mewari
- Time zone: UTC+5:30 (IST)
- PIN: 313702
- Vehicle registration: RJ-
- Nearest city: Udaipur
- Lok Sabha constituency: Udaipur

Dodawali is a village in Girwa Tehsil in Udaipur district in the Indian state of Rajasthan. As per Population Census 2011, the total population of Dodawali is 1706. The District head quarter of the village is Udaipur and it 30 kilometers away from the district headquarters.
