= Mavli tehsil =

Tehsil in Udaipur, Rajasthan

- Tehsil
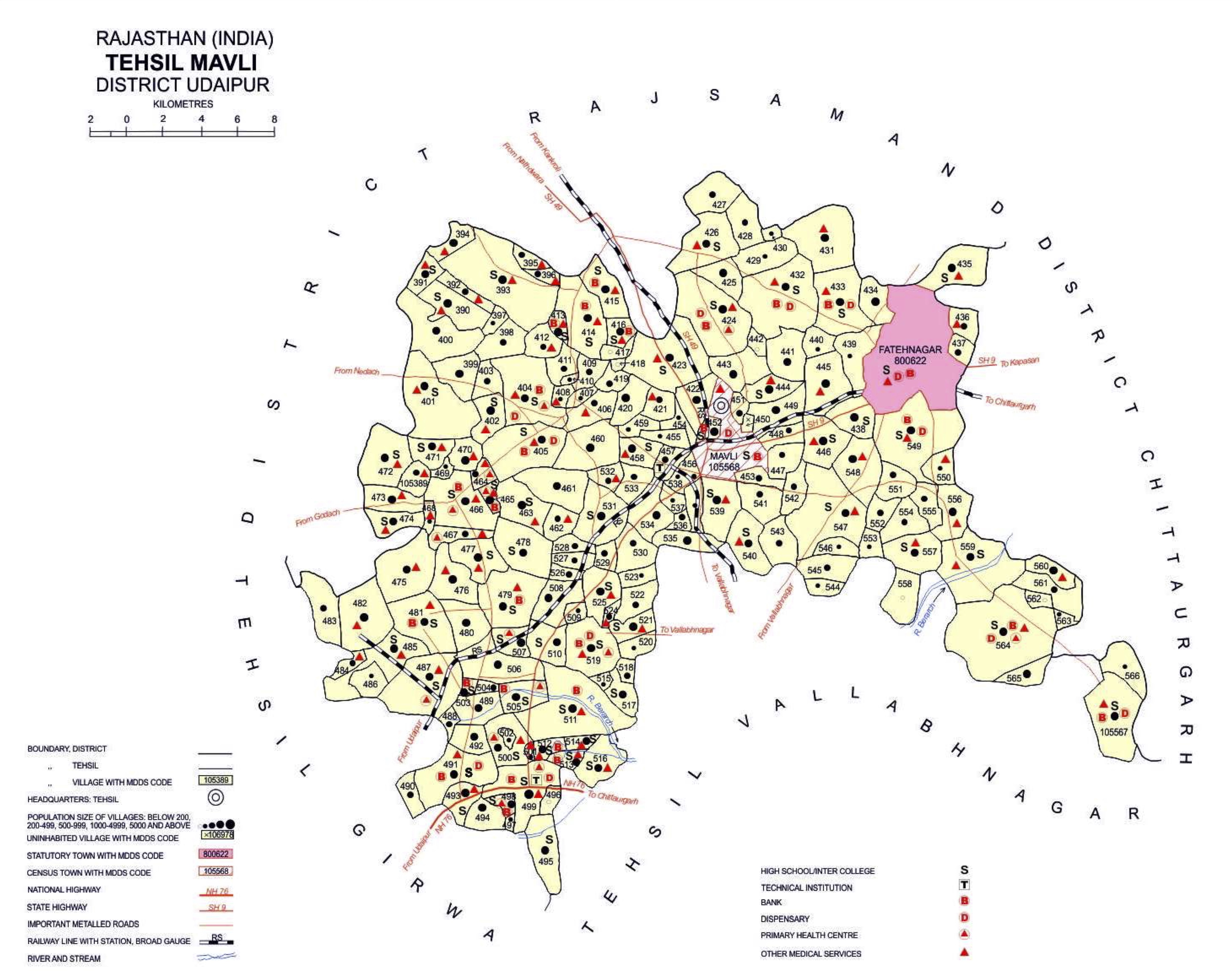
- Mavli tehsil

- Location of Mavli tehsil Mavli tehsil (India)
- Coordinates: 24.791727°N 73.982498°E
- Tehsil seat: Mavli

Area
  - Total: 837 km^{2} (323 sq mi)

Population (2011)
  - Total: 230,532
  - Density: 275/km^{2} (713/sq mi)
- Time zone: Indian Standard Time

Mavli is a tehsil of Udaipur district in Rajasthan, India.The tehsil consists of 179 revenue villages which are organized in 42 gram panchayats and one town (Mavli). The tehsil headquarter is located in the town of Mavli. The boundaries of Mavli tehsil are conterminous with those of Mavli panchayat samiti.

== History ==
Before the formation of the Republic of India, the territory of present-day Mavli tehsil was part of the former Udaipur State. With the formation of the United State of Rajasthan (precursor to the state of Rajasthan) in 1948, the new district of Udaipur was constituted which included Mavli tehsil.

== Geography ==
The area of Mavli tehsil is 837 square kilometres. The tehsil is bordered by Girwa tehsil to the west, Rajsamand district to the north, Chittaurgarh district to the east, and Vallabhnagar tehsil to the south. The annual average rainfall in Mavli tehsil is 604 mm, with an average of 30 rainy days per year.

22 villages of Mavli that are in the vicinity of the city of the Udaipur urban area are subject to the jurisdiction and urban planning policies of the Udaipur Urban Improvement Trust.

== Demographics ==
The population of Mavli tehsil is 230,532, of which 96% is classified as rural in the 2011 census. The sex ratio in the tehsil is 967. The tehsil's literacy rate is 52%.Mewari is the predominant language used in the tehsil, being the first language for 98% of the population of the tehsil.

== Economy ==
Agriculture is a significant sources of income in Mavli tehsil with 57% of workers identifying as cultivators or agricultural labourers in the 2011 census.
