= Aachhat =

- Village
- Location in Rajasthan, India Aachhat (India)
- Coordinates: 24.3865°N 74.0301°E
- Country: India
- State: Rajasthan
- District: Udaipur

Area
  - Total: 0.592 km^{2} (0.229 sq mi)

Population (2011)
  - Total: 211
  - Density: 356/km^{2} (923/sq mi)

Languages
  - Official: Hindi, Mewari
- Time zone: UTC+5:30 (IST)
- PIN: 313706
- Vehicle registration: RJ-
- Nearest city: Udaipur
- Lok Sabha constituency: Udaipur

Aachhat is a village located in Girwa Tehsil of Udaipur district in the Indian state of Rajasthan. It has a village code of 106653 and a pincode of 313706.

== Statistics ==
The village has population of 211 of which 105 are males while 106 are females. The village occupies an area of 59.2 hectares. The literacy rate of the village is 63.98% with males having a higher literacy rate than women. There are about 49 houses in the village. The village is situated at an altitude of 540 meters above sea level and follows IST time. The nearest major city is Udaipur which is situated about 53 kilometers away.

Note: Some of these figures are based on the 2011 Census and may not match with the present day figures.

== Culture ==
The primary languages spoken are Mewari and Hindi.

== Government and administration ==
It is administered with the Panchayati Raj system. As per 2009, Bori is the Gram Panchayat of the village. BJP is the major political party throughout the region.

== Commute ==
There are 2 national highways, NH48 and NH58 that pass through the village. There is no railway station within a 10 km radius of Aachhat. There are 2 nearby rivers, Sukat and Nekhadi which can be used as waterways.
