= Shakti Singh (16th century Indian noble) =

Prince of Maharana Udai Singh II of Mewar

Shakti Singh Sisodia
- Maharaj; Rana Vallabh

Progenitor of Shaktawat Rajputs
- Successor: Maharaj Bhan Singh of Bhinder
- Born: c. 1540; Kumbhalgarh, Kingdom of Mewar
- Died: c. 1594; Bhainsrorgarh, Kingdom of Mewar
- Issue: Kunwar Akhairaj; Maharaj Bhan Singh of Bhinder; Rawat Achal Das of Baansi; Chaturbhuj Singh; Maldeo Singh; Jodh Singh; Ballu Singh; Bagh Singh; Bhopat Singh; Dalpat Singh; Raj Singh; Sujan Singh; Mandan Singh; Madan Singh; Jagganath Singh; Bairisal Singh; Sultan Singh; Madho Singh; Manorathdeji (wife of Sawai Raja Soor Singh of Marwar); Princess married to Bikaner; Rani Damiyanti (wife of Yuvraj Maha Singh of Amber)
- Dynasty: Sisodia
- Father: Udai Singh II
- Mother: Sajja Bai Solanki
- Religion: Hinduism

Shakti Singh Sisodia of Mewar, known in the colloquial literature as Shakta, Sagta, Sagat, was the son of Maharana Udai Singh II of Mewar and Rani Sajja Bai Solanki. He was a Kshatriya Rajput and the younger brother of Maharana Pratap. He was also the eponymous founder of the Shaktawat clan of Sisodia Rajputs.

== Early life ==
He was the second son of Maharana Udai Singh II of Mewar born from his second wife Sajja Bai Solanki (of Toda Rai Singh Solanki family). He was born just months later after his elder brother Maharana Pratap. His younger brother was Maharaj Veeramdev, progenitor of the Veeramdevot Baba Ranawat branch of Mewar Sisodias, younger son of the same Solanki Rani. He had hostile relations with his father. Some sources say he was expelled from Mewar by his father Maharana Udai Singh.

== Meeting with Akbar ==
When Mughal Emperor Akbar was marching towards Chittor to capture it, he invited Shakti Singh for meeting at Dholpur. He accepted the proposal and they met on 31 August 1567 but when Akbar explained his plan to capture Chittaurgarh and offered him the throne of Mewar against his own family in a hope that people of Mewar will not resist Akbar if Shakti Singh will be crowned. Shakti Singh left the meeting in anger without Akbar's permission and at midnight he ran away from Dholpur where he was encamped to inform his father about Akbar's plan to capture Chittor to save Chittor fort. This angered Akbar, resulting in immediate change of his plan to attack Malwa and he marched his army towards Chittaurgarh. Only because of Shakti Singh his father was able to make preparations for the Mughal attack. However, Chittor was sacked in Siege of Chittorgarh (1567–1568)

== Later life ==
His father died at Gogunda on 28 February 1572 and his elder brother Maharana Pratap was crowned Maharana of Mewar on 1 March 1572 by nobles of Mewar. Some sources say he was again expelled this time by his brother due to mistaken death of Raj Purohit Narayanandas by Shakti. He went into the service of Dungarpur Rawal Askaran between 1572 and 1576, there he killed any noble named Jagmal due to his hot temper. He then went to Mughal service however there are no records of him fighting in any war for Mughals. In 1576 the Battle of Haldighati, he returned to his brother Maharana Pratap's side and gave his own horse after the famous Chetak collapsed near Banas River to Maharana Pratap. He also killed Khurasan Khan and Multan Khan who were chasing Pratap. He also played a pivotal role in the Battle of Dewair in 1582 for the Mewar forces.

== After Pratap ==
Until his death in 1594, Shakti Singh lived in Bhainsrorgarh, on the banks of Chambal River. Later during the reign of Maharana Amar Singh, Shakti Singh's 11 out of 17 sons were martyred fighting for Mewar against Mughal forces. Rawat Achal Das of Baansi, was the leader of Mewar Forces during his time. Battle of Untala is a famous incident of self sacrifice of the Chundawats and Shaktawats during the tough times of Mewar.

This couplet is very famous among Mewari people which praises Shakti -

शक्ता थारी शक्ति नु हरि जाने ना कोई,

शुरा थारी हुँकार सु महाकाल निकट ना आए

His descendants are known as the Shaktawats.

== Portrayal in adaptions ==
In Indian historical TV serial Bharat Ka Veer Putra - Maharana Pratap, adult Shakti Singh is portrayed by Vineet Kumar.
