= Jaswantgarh (Udaipur) =

- Village
- Location in Rajasthan, India Jaswantgarh (India)
- Coordinates: 24.793°N 73.465°E
- Country: India
- State: Rajasthan
- District: Udaipur

Population (2011)
  - Total: 3,262

Languages
  - Official: Hindi, Mewari
- Time zone: UTC+5:30 (IST)
- PIN: 313705
- Vehicle registration: RJ-
- Nearest city: Udaipur
- Lok Sabha constituency: Udaipur

Jaswantgarh is a small Village in Gogunda Tehsil in Udaipur District of Rajasthan, situated about 423 km (263 mi) from Jaipur and around 38 km (24 mi) from the District head quarter Udaipur.

It has great landscape and the famous temple of Piplaajmata Mandir. The village is administrated by Sarpanch who is elected representative of village by the local elections.

== Demographics ==
As per Population Census 2011, the total population of Jaswantgarh is 3262. Males constitute 51.5% of the population and females 48.5%.

== Literacy ==
The literacy rate of Jaswantgarh village is 54.5% as per 2011 census which is very low compared to 66.11% of Rajasthan. The male literacy stands at 80.54% while female literacy rate was 47.37%.
