= Pai (village) =

- Village
- Country: India
- State: Rajasthan
- District: Udaipur

Population (2011)
  - Total: 4,558

Languages
  - Official: Hindi, Mewari
- Time zone: UTC+5:30 (IST)
- PIN: 313031
- Vehicle registration: RJ-
- Nearest city: Udaipur
- Lok Sabha constituency: Udaipur

Pai is a village in Jhadol Tehsil in Udaipur district in the Indian state of Rajasthan. It is administrated by Sarpanch (Head of Village) who is elected representative of village. It is located on hilly area above 540 meters above the sea level.

The geographical area of village is 3016.56 hectares.
