= Cheetarawas village =

Cheetarawas
- Village
- Country: India
- State: Rajasthan
- District: Udaipur

Area
  - Total: 4.68 km^{2} (1.81 sq mi)

Population (2011)
  - Total: 845
  - Density: 181/km^{2} (468/sq mi)

Languages
  - Official: Hindi, Mewari
- Time zone: UTC+5:30 (IST)
- PIN: 313704
- Vehicle registration: RJ-
- Nearest city: Udaipur

Cheetarawas is a village in Gogunda Tehsil in Udaipur district in the Indian state of Rajasthan. It is located 70 km away from district headquarter Udaipur. As per Population Census 2011, Cheetarawas village has population of 845.
