= Aala Ki Dhani =

- Village
- Location in Rajasthan, India Aala Ki Dhani (India)
- Country: India
- State: Rajasthan
- District: Udaipur

Area
  - Total: 5.4037 km^{2} (2.0864 sq mi)

Population (2011)
  - Total: 1,096
  - Density: 202.8/km^{2} (525.3/sq mi)

Languages
  - Official: Hindi, Mewari
- Time zone: UTC+5:30 (IST)
- PIN: 313024
- Vehicle registration: RJ-
- Nearest city: Udaipur
- Lok Sabha constituency: Udaipur

Aala Ki Dhani is a village located in Girwa Tehsil of Udaipur district in the Indian state of Rajasthan. As per Population Census 2011, Aachhat village has population of 1096 of which 567 are males while 529 are females.

It is administrated by Sarpanch (Head of Village) who is elected representative of village.
