= Jhadol =

Jhadol Jharol
- Town
- Location in Rajasthan, India Jhadol (India)
- Coordinates: 24.3533°N 73.53°E
- Country: India
- State: Rajasthan
- District: Udaipur
- Tehsil: Jhadol
- Elevation: 605 m (1,985 ft)

Population (2001)
  - Total: 4,753

Languages
  - Official: Hindi
- Time zone: UTC+5:30 (IST)
- PIN: 313702
- Telephone code: 02959
- ISO 3166 code: RJ-IN
- Vehicle registration: RJ-
- Nearest city: Udaipur
- Lok Sabha constituency: Udaipur

Jhadol (Jharol) is a village in Jhadol Tehsil in Udaipur district in the Indian state of Rajasthan. As of the 2001 census, it had a population of 4,753 in 988 households.

It is the headquarters of Jhadol tehsil (sub-district), and is sometimes written as Jhadol (Phalasia) to distinguish it from two other villages of the same name in Udaipur district, one in Sarada tehsil and the other in Kherwara tehsil. There are also localities called Jhadol in the Ajmer and Bundi districts of Rajasthan, and a number of villages in the state are called Jhadoli.
