= Bajajnagar, Udaipur =

Coordinates: 21°08′N 79°04′E

Bajajnagar
- Interactive map of Bajajnagar
- Country: India
- State: Rajasthan
- District: Udaipur

Population (2011)
  - Total: 2,124

Languages
  - Official: Hindi
- Time zone: UTC+5:30 (IST)
- Telephone code: 0294
- Vehicle registration: RJ 27

Bajajnagar is a census town in the Mavli tehsil of Udaipur district, Rajasthan, India. It is located around 18 km from Mavli and 25 km from the district headquarter, Udaipur.

== Demographics ==
According to Census India 2011 data, the population of Bajajnagar is 2,124, including 1,138 males and 986 females.
