= Sagatada =

Village in Rajasthan, India

Coordinates: 24°09′52″N 73°51′19″E

Sagatada or Sagatra is a village located in Salumbar district, Rajasthan, India. This village is near Chawand, which was the third capital of Mewar at the time of Maharana Pratap.

Sagatada is a 300-year-old village, which is situated near the bank of the Gadgal River. There is one lord Shiva temple, Shri Kamleshwar Mahadev Temple, about 200 years old. In front of Shiva's temple there are big banyan trees which cover the temple. At the temple are many small statues of other Hindu lords, including Hanuman, Ganesha Kartikeya, and Brahma. Small temples of Amba Maya and a Bodhi Tree can be found in front of Shiva's temple.

Approximately 3,000 to 5,000 people live here. Approximately 70% of the population are Brahmins and 30% are the other castes, such as Jain, Lohar, Suthar, Kumbhar, Navi, and Meena. At the center of the village is the Laksmhi Narayana Temple. On the main bus stand is Shri Sati Mata temple. Many important facilities, like hospitals and high schools, can also be found here.
