= Biliya =

- Village
- Location in Rajasthan, India Biliya (India)
- Coordinates: 24.51°N 73.73°E
- Country: India
- State: Rajasthan
- District: Udaipur

Area
  - Total: 2.4876 km^{2} (0.9605 sq mi)

Population (2011)
  - Total: 350
  - Density: 140/km^{2} (360/sq mi)

Languages
  - Official: Hindi, Mewari
- Time zone: UTC+5:30 (IST)
- PIN: 313003
- Vehicle registration: RJ-27
- Nearest city: Udaipur
- Lok Sabha constituency: Udaipur

Biliya is a village in Udaipur district in the Indian state of Rajasthan. The district headquarters of the village is Udaipur. It is 13 kilometers away from the Udaipur district headquarters. As per Population Census 2011, the total population of Biliya is 350. Males constitute 49% of the population and females 51%. The literacy rate of Biliya village is 60.0% as per 2011 census.
