= Kumariya Khera =

- Village
- Country: India
- State: Rajasthan
- District: Udaipur

Population (2011)
  - Total: 799

Languages
  - Official: Hindi, Mewari
- Time zone: UTC+5:30 (IST)
- PIN: 313801
- Vehicle registration: RJ-
- Nearest city: Udaipur
- Lok Sabha constituency: Udaipur

Kumariya Khera is a village in Udaipur district in the Indian state of Rajasthan. It is located 34 km towards south of the Udaipur city and falls under Udaipur Lok Sabha constituency.
