= Bargaon, Udaipur =

Bargaon
- neighbourhood
- Location in Rajasthan, India Bargaon (India)
- Coordinates: 24°38′11.2344″N 73°39′24.4686″E
- Country: India
- State: Rajasthan
- District: Udaipur

Population (2011)
  - Total: 9,193

Languages
  - Official: Hindi
- Time zone: UTC+5:30 (IST)
- Telephone code: 0294
- Vehicle registration: RJ 27

Bargaon is a census town in the Girwa tehsil of Udaipur district, Rajasthan, India. It is situated on the Udaipur-Gogunda highway, around 4 kilometres (2.5 mi) from the city centre, 2 kilometres (1.2 mi) from Bhuwana and around 387 kilometres (240 mi) from the state capital at Jaipur. It has Dungla Tehsil towards East, Bhopalsagar Tehsil towards North, Mavli Tehsil towards North and Bhadesar Tehsil towards East.

== Demographics ==
According to Census India 2011 data, the population of Bargaon is 9193, including 4908 males and 4285 females. According to same data, female sex ratio is 873, child sex ratio is 759 and literacy rate of Bargaon (Rural) city is 78.64% out of which 83.07% males are literate and 73.56% females are literate.
