= Banswari =

- Village
- Country: India
- State: Rajasthan
- District: Udaipur
- Tehsil: Jhadol

Population (2011)
  - Total: 1,134

Languages
  - Official: Hindi
- Time zone: UTC+5:30 (IST)
- PIN: 313031
- Vehicle registration: RJ-
- Nearest city: Udaipur
- Lok Sabha constituency: Udaipur

Banswari is a village in Jhadol Tehsil in Udaipur district in the Indian state of Rajasthan. It is administrated by Sarpanch (Head of Village) who is elected representative of village.

== Education ==
The literacy rate of Banswari village is low and as per 2011 census it was 52.92% compared to 66.11% of Rajasthan.
