= Kumbhalgarh Wildlife Sanctuary =

Wildlife sanctuary in India

- IUCN category IV (habitat/species management area)
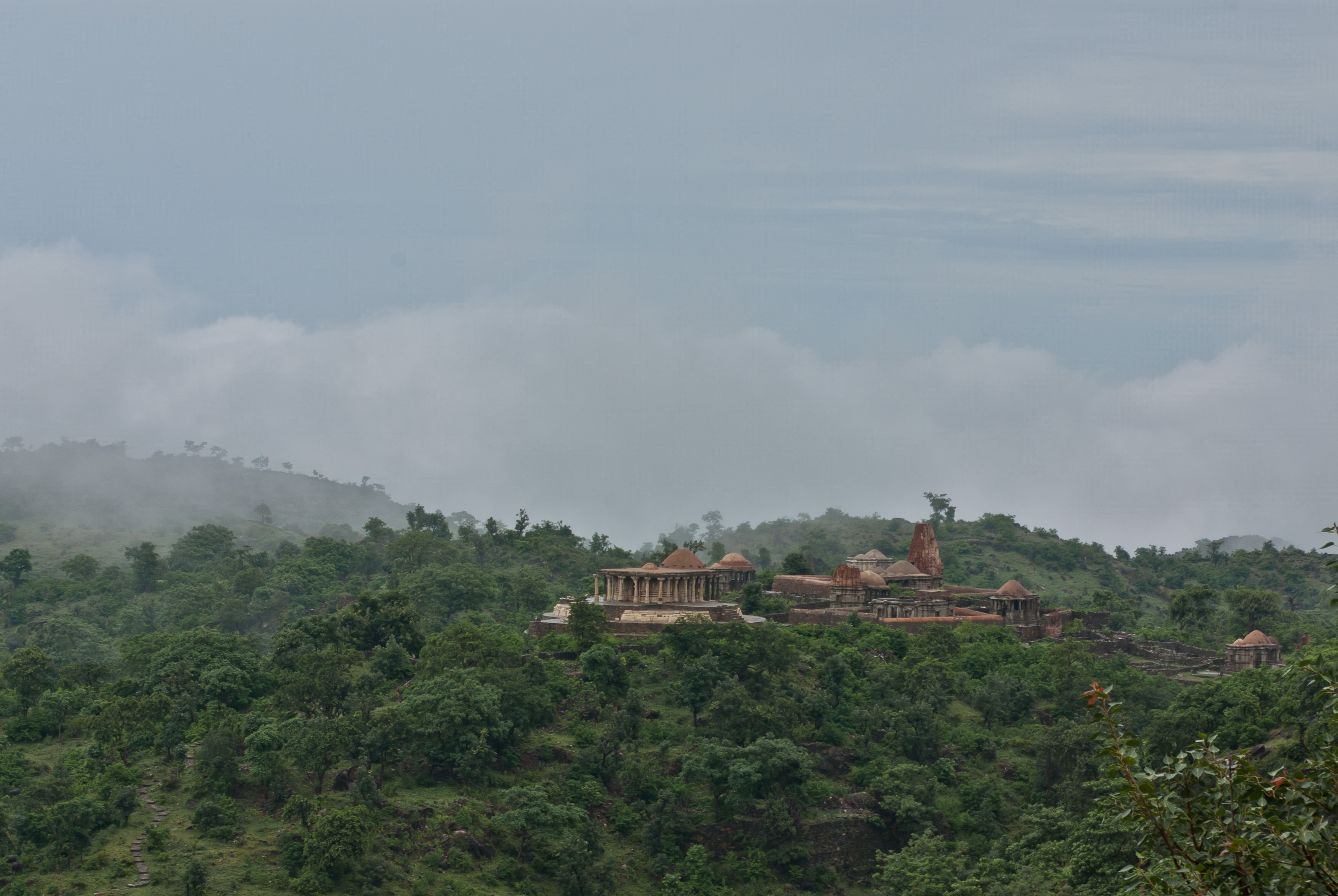

- Location within Rajasthan Location within India
- Interactive map of Kumbhalgarh Wildlife Sanctuary
- Location: Rajsamand District, Rajasthan, India
- Nearest city: Udaipur
- Coordinates: 25°08′02″N 73°33′47″E
- Area: 610.528 km^{2} (235.726 sq mi)
- Established: 1971

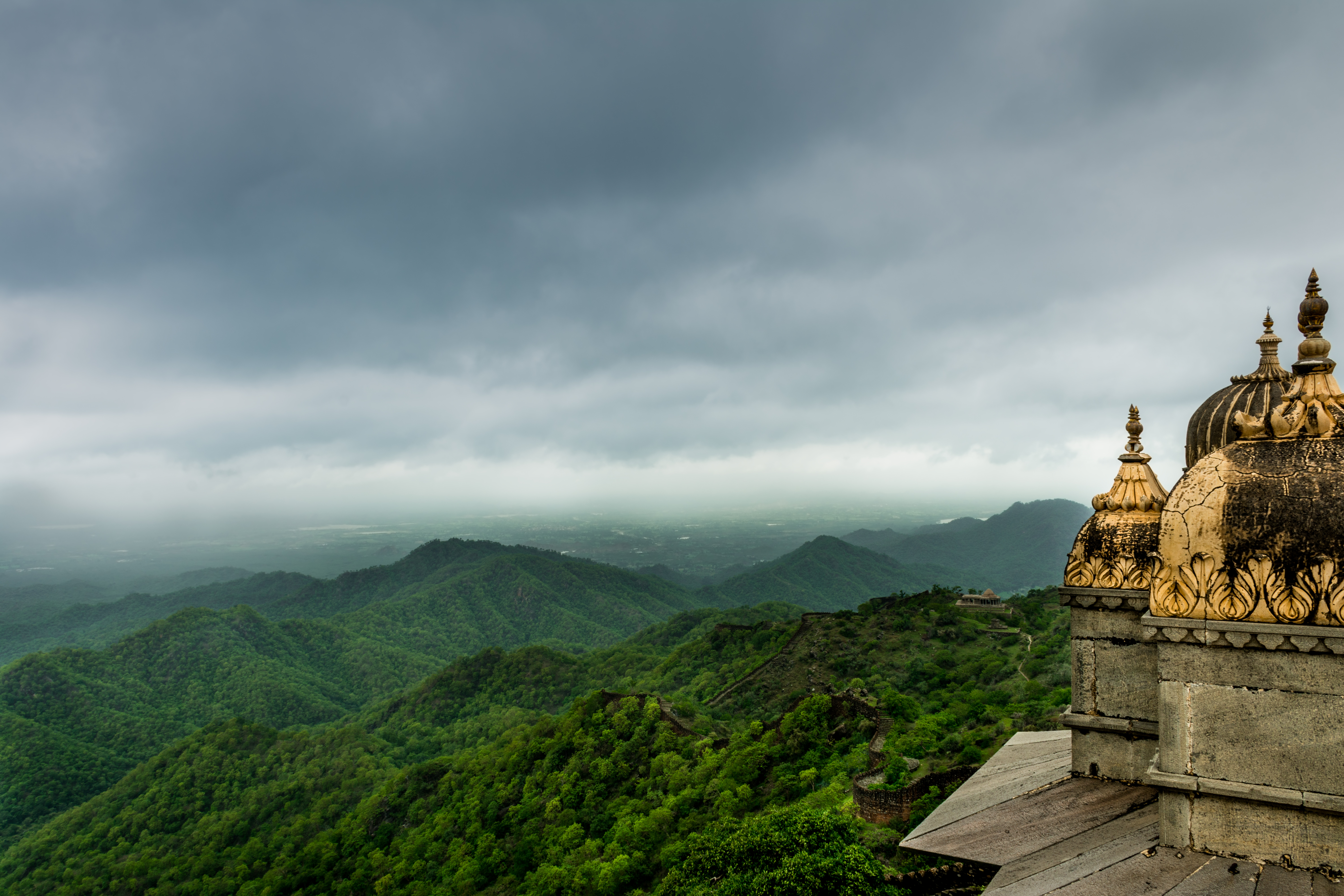
A view of Kumbhalgarh Wildlife Sanctuary as seen from the fort

Kumbhalgarh Wildlife Sanctuary is located in the Rajsamand district of Rajasthan State in western India. It surrounds the Kumbhalgarh Fortress and covers an area of 610.528 km^{2} (236 sq mi). The sanctuary extends across the Aravalli Range, covering parts of Rajsamand, Udaipur, and Pali districts, ranging from 500 to 1,300 metres (1,600 to 4,300 ft) in elevation. It is part of the Khathiar-Gir dry deciduous forests ecoregion.

== Geography ==
Kumbhalgarh Wildlife Sanctuary takes name after the impressive historic fort of Kumbhalgarh. The wildlife sanctuary consists of a 224.890 km^{2} (87 sq mi) core area and a 385.638 km^{2} (149 sq mi) buffer area. It covers four hill and mountain ranges of the Aravalli: Kumbhalgarh range; Sadri range; Desuri range and Bokhada range. Twenty-two villages are located inside the sanctuary. The soils are generally thin, mostly of sandy loam. The base rocks are mainly metamorphic, from the Archean. The topography of the sanctuary can be divided into hills, piedmont and plain. The areas of plain have mostly been co-opted for crops.

== Fauna ==
Kumbhalgarh Wildlife Sanctuary harbours the Indian wolf, Indian leopard, sloth bear, striped hyena, golden jackal, jungle cat, sambhar, nilgai, chausingha, chinkara and Indian hare. The leopard is the apex predator in the sanctuary. The birds at Kumbhalgarh includes the grey junglefowl and Indian eagle-owl. The amphibians include the common toad, Indian bullfrog, and skipper frog; reptiles like the rat snake, Indian cobra, and checkered keelback; fish species such as katla, mahseer, and rohu; invertebrates like alsiya, bhanwar, and tannin.

== See also ==
- Arid Forest Research Institute (AFRI)
- Wildlife of India
- Bhensrodgarh Wildlife Sanctuary
