= Phanda, Udaipur =

Phanda
- Village
- Location in Rajasthan, India Phanda (India)
- Coordinates: 24.52°N 73.72°E
- Country: India
- State: Rajasthan
- District: Udaipur

Area
  - Total: 2.3854 km^{2} (0.9210 sq mi)

Population (2011)
  - Total: 1,005
  - Density: 421.3/km^{2} (1,091/sq mi)

Languages
  - Official: Hindi, Mewari
- Time zone: UTC+5:30 (IST)
- PIN: 313002
- Vehicle registration: RJ-27
- Nearest city: Udaipur
- Lok Sabha constituency: Udaipur

Phanda is a village in Udaipur district in the Indian state of Rajasthan. It is located ten km towards South from District headquarters Udaipur. As per Population Census 2011, the total population of Phanda is 1005.
