= Badanga =

Coordinates: 24°36′N 73°34′E

- Village
- Location in Rajasthan, India Badanga (India)
- Country: India
- State: Rajasthan
- District: Udaipur

Area
  - Total: 6.8 km^{2} (2.6 sq mi)

Population (2011)
  - Total: 1,243
  - Density: 180/km^{2} (470/sq mi)

Languages
  - Official: Hindi, Mewari
- Time zone: UTC+5:30 (IST)
- PIN: 313702
- Vehicle registration: RJ-
- Nearest city: Udaipur
- Lok Sabha constituency: Udaipur

Badanga is a village in Udaipur district in the Indian state of Rajasthan. As per Population Census 2011, literacy rate of Badanga village was 35.28% which is very low compared to 66.11% of Rajasthan. The District headquarter of the village is Udaipur.
