= Tarpal =

Coordinates: 24°49′N 73°26′E

- Village
- Location in Rajasthan, India Tarpal (India)
- Country: India
- State: Rajasthan
- District: Udaipur

Population (2011)
  - Total: 2,197

Languages
  - Official: Hindi, Mewari
- Time zone: UTC+5:30 (IST)
- Vehicle registration: RJ-
- Nearest city: Udaipur
- Lok Sabha constituency: Udaipur

Tarpal is a small Village in Gogunda Tehsil in Udaipur District of Rajasthan, situated about 413 km from Jaipur and around 53 km from the District headquarter Udaipur.

It has great landscape and the famous temple of Eklingnath Shiv Temple. The village is administrated by Sarpanch who is elected representative of village by the local elections.

== Demographics ==
As per Population Census 2011, the total population of Jeerai is 2197. Males constitute 52% of the population and females 48%.
