= Gudli =

- Village
- Country: India
- State: Rajasthan
- District: Udaipur

Population (2011)
  - Total: 3,027

Languages
  - Official: Hindi, Mewari
- Time zone: UTC+5:30 (IST)
- PIN: 313024
- Vehicle registration: RJ-
- Nearest city: Udaipur
- Lok Sabha constituency: Udaipur

Gudli is a village in Mavli Tehsil in Udaipur district in the Indian state of Rajasthan. It is administrated by Mavli assembly constituency. It is located on a hilly area above 502 meters above the sea level and 42 km east from the Udaipur city.
