= Kaya (village) =

Coordinates: 21°56′N 82°09′E

- Village
- Location in Rajasthan, India Kaya (India)
- Country: India
- State: Rajasthan
- District: Udaipur

Population (2011)
  - Total: 2,570

Languages
  - Official: Hindi, Mewari
- Time zone: UTC+5:30 (IST)
- PIN: 313801
- Vehicle registration: RJ-
- Nearest city: Udaipur
- Lok Sabha constituency: Udaipur

Kaya is a village in Udaipur district in the Indian state of Rajasthan. It is located 14 KM towards south of the Udaipur city and falls under Udaipur Lok Sabha constituency.

It is administrated by Sarpanch (Head of Village) who is elected representative of village.

== Postal services ==
The postal services in Kaya falls within the nearby Parsad town.
