= Borao Ka Khera =

- Village
- Country: India
- State: Rajasthan
- District: Udaipur

Population (2011)
  - Total: 224

Languages
  - Official: Hindi, Mewari
- Time zone: UTC+5:30 (IST)
- PIN: 313702
- Vehicle registration: RJ-
- Nearest city: Udaipur
- Lok Sabha constituency: Udaipur

Borao Ka Khera is a village in Udaipur district in the Indian state of Rajasthan. It is administrated by Sarpanch (Head of Village) who is elected representative of village. It is located on hilly area above 540 meters above the sea level.
