= Chavand, Rajasthan =

Chawand
- Town
- Location in Rajasthan, India Chawand (India)
- Coordinates: 24°11′15″N 73°48′37″E
- Country: India
- State: Rajasthan
- District: Udaipur district

Languages
  - Official: Hindi
- Time zone: UTC+5:30 (IST)
- ISO 3166 code: RJ-IN
- Vehicle registration: RJ-

Chawand (also spelt Chavand) is a town in Sarada tehsil of Udaipur district, Rajasthan. The town was the last capital of Mewar during the reign of Maharana Pratap.

After the battle of Haldighati, Maharana Pratap captured this area from the Rathors and established his new capital at Chawand in 1585 CE. Maharana Pratap built Chamunda Devi temple here. He built about 16 hideouts within the radius of 10 km to 1 km around his capital to look after the administration. Many secret army stores, palaces, temples and buildings for his loyal Bhils were also constructed here. During a hunting accident, he died on 29 January 1597 in Chawand. A statue of Maharana Pratap and his four aide has been built in his memory. A ruined palace once occupied by Pratap is located in Chawand.
