= Idana Mata Temple =

Hindu Temple

Religion
- Affiliation: Hinduism
- District: Udaipur district

Location
- Location: Udaipur
- State: Rajasthan
- Country: India

Idana Mata Temple is located in the Aravalli hills, approximately 60 km from Udaipur city, in Bambora village, Rajasthan. It is famous for a unique phenomenon where the idol spontaneously takes a "fire bath" several times a month.

== Agni Snaan (Fire Bath) ==
Two to three times a month, flames spontaneously rise around the idol. Everything offered to the goddess, such as garlands and chunris (scarves), burns to ashes, but the idol itself remains miraculously unharmed, a spectacle that draws large crowds of devotees.
