= Kherwara tehsil =

Tehsil in Udaipur, Rajasthan, India

- Tehsil
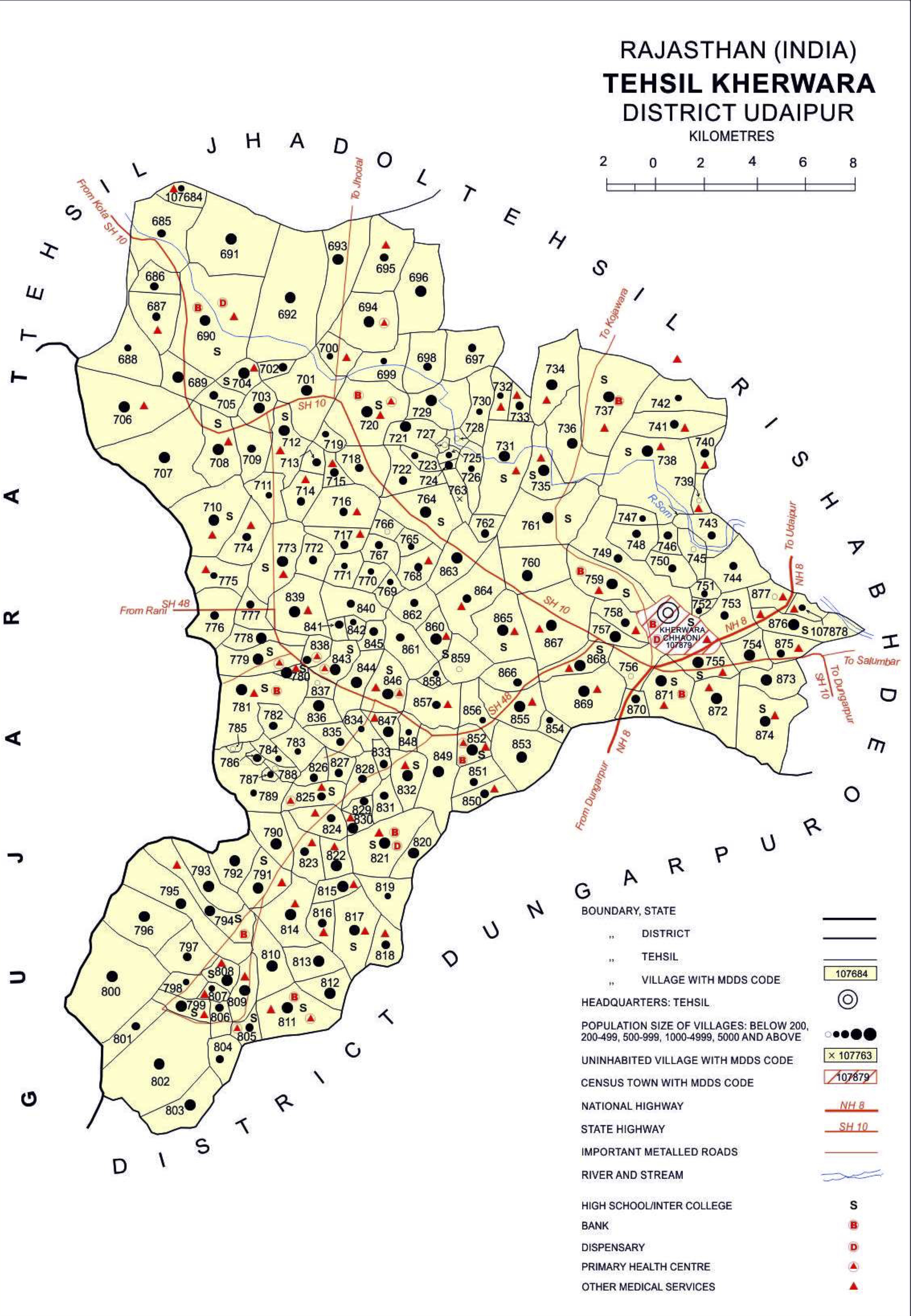
- Kherwara tehsil

- Location of Kherwara tehsil Kherwara tehsil (India)
- Coordinates: 23.987334°N 73.606010°E
- Tehsil seat: Kherwara Chhaoni

Area
  - Total: 594 km^{2} (229 sq mi)

Population (2011)
  - Total: 206,777
  - Density: 348/km^{2} (902/sq mi)
- Time zone: Indian Standard Time

Kherwara is a tehsil of Udaipur district in Rajasthan, India. The tehsil consists of 195 revenue villages and 1 census town. The tehsil headquarter is located in the town of Kherwara Chhaoni. The tehsil is part of the Kherwara panchayat samiti (block).

== History ==
Before the formation of the Republic of India, the territory of present-day Kherwara tehsil was part of the former Udaipur State. As of 1940, Kherwara was one of the 8 districts of Udaipur State (possibly with boundaries similar to present-day Kherwara tehsil).

With the formation of the United State of Rajasthan (precursor to the state of Rajasthan) in 1948, the new district of Udaipur was constituted which included the area of present-day Kherwara tehsil.

In 2008, 79 villages were carved out of Kherwara tehsil to form, along with 19 villages from Sarada tehsil, the new tehsil of Rishabhdeo.

== Geography ==
The area of Kherwara tehsil is 594 square kilometres. The tehsil is bordered by Jhadol tehsil to the north, Rishabdeo tehsil to the east, Dungarpur district to the south, and the state of Gujarat to the west. Major highways in the tehsil are National Highway 8 and State Highways 10 and 48. The annual average rainfall in Kherwara tehsil is 594 mm, with an average of 30 rainy days per year.

== Demographics ==
The population of Kherwara tehsil is 2,06,777, with a women to men ratio of 96%. 73% of the population belongs to scheduled tribes. 96% of the population of the tehsil is rural and the literacy rate of the tehsil is 54%. Wagdi is the predominant language used in the tehsil, it being the mother tongue for 91% of the population of the tehsil.

Because of its predominant scheduled tribe population, Kherwara tehsil has been designated a scheduled area which allows special protection of tribal culture and other interests.

== Economy ==
Agriculture is the most significant sources of income in Kherwara tehsil with 63% of workers identifying as cultivators or agricultural labourers in the 2011 census.
