= Rathasena Mata Temple =

- Location in Udaipur

Religion
- Affiliation: Hinduism
- District: Udaipur district

Location
- Location: Udaipur
- State: Rajasthan
- Country: India
- Interactive map of Rathasena Mata Temple
- Coordinates: 24.731938°N 73.748812°E

Rathasena Mata Temple is located on a hill on Maruwas area in the city of Udaipur, Rajasthan. This temple is located on a green hill in the Maruwas, area of Udaipur. It has uphill slope walkway to climb. It enshrines the stone idol of Rathasan Mata (also called Ratheshwari Mata or Rathsashayna Mata).

== Location ==
The temple is located at 24.731938°N 73.748812°E.
