= Bhalariya =

- Census town
- Location in Rajasthan, India Bhalariya (India)
- Coordinates: 24.3703°N 73.7157°E
- Country: India
- State: Rajasthan
- District: Udaipur

Population (2001)
  - Total: 6,530

Languages
  - Official: Hindi
- Time zone: UTC+5:30 (IST)
- ISO 3166 code: RJ-IN

Bhalariya is a census town in Udaipur district in the state of Rajasthan, India.

== Demographics ==
As of 2001 India census, Bhalariya had a population of 6530. Males constitute 53% of the population and females 47%. Bhalariya has an average literacy rate of 83%, higher than the national average of 59.5%; with 55% of the males and 45% of the females literate. 10% of the population is under 6 years of age.
