= Badgaon tehsil =

Tehsil in Udaipur, Rajasthan, India

- Tehsil
- Location of Badgaon tehsil Badgaon tehsil (India)
- Coordinates: 24.686893°N 73.646294°E
- Country: India
- State: Udaipur

Population
  - Total: 157,963
- Time zone: Indian Standard Time

Badgaon is a tehsil in Udaipur district of Rajasthan, India.

== History ==
Before the formation of the Republic of India, the territory of present-day Badgaon tehsil was part of the former Udaipur State. With the formation of the United State of Rajasthan (precursor to the state of Rajasthan) in 1948, the new district of Udaipur was constituted which included the territory of present-day Badgaon tehsil.

Badgaon tehsil was established on 31 May 2012, its area being carved out of Girwa tehsil.

== Geography ==
The tehsil consists of 111 revenue villages which are organized in 25 gram panchayats. The boundaries of Badgaon tehsil are conterminous with that of the eponymous Badgaon panchayat samiti.

37 villages of Badgaon that are in the vicinity of the city of the Udaipur urban area are subject to the jurisdiction urban planning policies of the Udaipur Urban Improvement Trust.

The annual average rainfall in Badgaon tehsil is 608 mm, with an average of 32 rainy days per year.
