= Newa Talai =

- Census town
- Location in Rajasthan, India Newa Talai (India)
- Coordinates: 24.3678°N 73.7541°E
- Country: India
- State: Rajasthan
- District: Udaipur

Population (2001)
  - Total: 4,669

Languages
  - Official: Hindi
- Time zone: UTC+5:30 (IST)
- ISO 3166 code: RJ-IN

Newa Talai is a census town in Udaipur district in the Indian state of Rajasthan.

== Demographics ==
As of 2001 India census, Newa Talai had a population of 4669. Males constitute 53% of the population and females 47%. Newa Talai has an average literacy rate of 69%, higher than the national average of 59.5%: male literacy is 78%, and female literacy is 58%. In Newa Talai, 13% of the population is under 6 years of age.
