= Boraj Tawaran =

Boraj Tawaran Tanwara Ki Boraj Jagir, Boraj Tanwaran
- village
- Location in Rajasthan, India Boraj Tawaran (India)
- Coordinates: 24.08°N 74.06°E
- Country: India
- State: Rajasthan
- District: Salumbar
- Block: Jhallara
- Gram Panchayat: Malpur
- Founder: Amar Singh Tanwar
- Named for: Tanwar clan

Government
  - Body: Panchayat
- Elevation: 259 m (850 ft)

Population (2011)
  - Total: 571

Languages
  - Official: Hindi, Rajasthani
- Time zone: UTC+5:30 (IST)
- PIN: 313027
- ISO 3166 code: RJ-IN
- Vehicle registration: RJ-58

Boraj Tawaran is a village in the Salumbar district of Rajasthan, India. It comes under the Malpur gram panchayat, in Jhallara block. The village is located 8 km east of Salumber. Salumbar is nearest town to Boraj Tawaran village. Boraj Tanwaran or Boraj Tawaran was also known as Tanwara Ki Boraj Jagir. Around 1700 CE, a Thakur of the Tanwar clan moved to Salumber during the rule of Rawat Kesari Singh Chundawat ("Rawat" is a princely title). On 13 December 1876, his descendant Thakur Tej Singh Tanwar was granted the jagir of the present-day village site to Rawat Jodh Singh Chundawat.

== School ==
- Govt.Sr.Sec.School-Boraj
- Govt.Primary School-Boraj Tanwaran

== Dam and Rivers ==
- Amba Mata Dam - A very beautiful dam is built between two hills at a distance of 1 km from the village, the water of which is used for irrigation in 10-12 villages through a canal. The credit for the construction of the dam goes to Amar Singh Tanwar, a descendant of Tej Singh Tanwar.
- Rivers- There are two rivers in the village which flow throughout the year.

== Features ==
Boraj Tawaran Known for the Amba Mata dam, rivers, forests, hills, waterfalls and hunting ground.

== Hunting Ground ==
Due to forests and hills, many wild animals are found here, Due to which earlier it was the most favorite place for hunting.

== Festival ==
- Diwali- On this festival, Kesiya is sung from door to door especially by the tribal community.
- Holi- Gair dance is performed by the villagers on this festival.
- Makar Sankranti- Earlier villagers used to play gediya game on this festival.

== Agriculture and Animal Husbandry ==
- In agriculture, mainly wheat and maize are cultivated.
- Most of the people also do animal husbandry in which cows, buffaloes and goats are reared.
