= Salumbar tehsil =

Tehsil in Salumbar, Rajasthan, India

- Tehsil
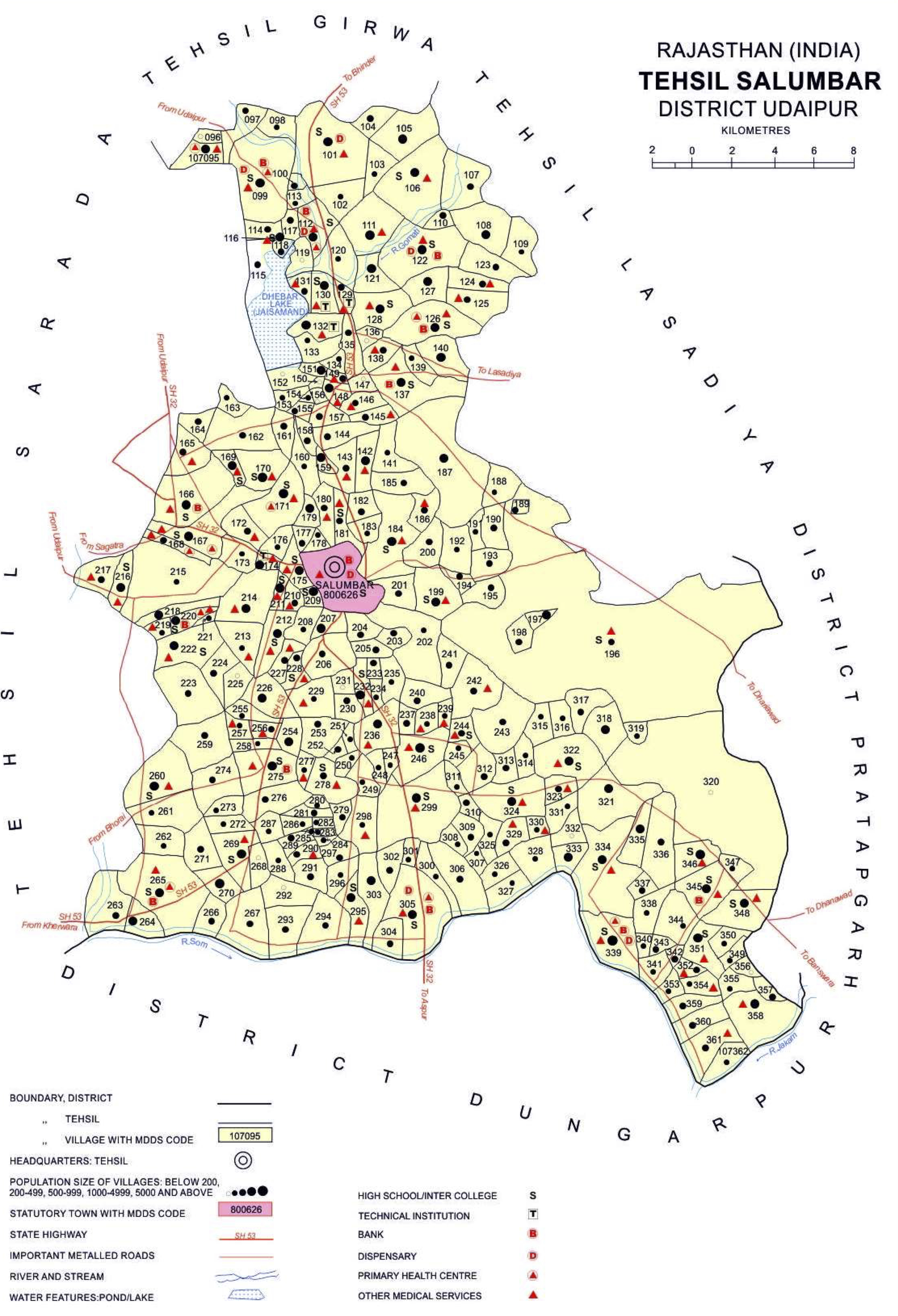
- Salumbar tehsil

- Location of Mavli tehsil Salumbar tehsil (India)
- Coordinates: 24.135081°N 74.042733°E
- Tehsil seat: Salumbar

Area
  - Total: 840 km^{2} (320 sq mi)

Population (2011)
  - Total: 248,337
  - Density: 300/km^{2} (770/sq mi)
- Time zone: Indian Standard Time

Salumbar (also spelt Salumber) is a tehsil of Salumbar district in Rajasthan, India.The tehsil consists of 268 revenue villages which are organized in 46 gram panchayats and one town. The tehsil headquarter is located in the town of Salumbar.

== History ==
At least some of the area of present-day Salumbar tehsil was part of Salumbar thikana, a jagir or estate of Udaipur State, since c.1373 to 1948. With the formation of the United State of Rajasthan (precursor to the state of Rajasthan) in 1948, the new district of Udaipur was constituted which included Salumbar as one of its tehsils.

== Geography ==
The boundaries of Salumbar tehsil are conterminous with those of Salumbar panchayat samiti. The annual average rainfall in Salumbar tehsil is 692 mm, with an average of 32 rainy days per year.

== Demographics ==
The population of Salumbar tehsil is 248,337, of which 93% is classified as rural in the 2011 census. The sex ratio (number of females per 1000 males) in the tehsil is 971. The tehsil's literacy rate is 43%. 53% of the population of the tehsil belongs to scheduled tribes while 5% belongs to scheduled castes. Agriculture is the most significant sources of income in Salumbar tehsil with 73% of workers identifying as cultivators or agricultural labourers in the 2011 census.
