= Nexus Celebration Mall =

Shopping mall in Udaipur, India

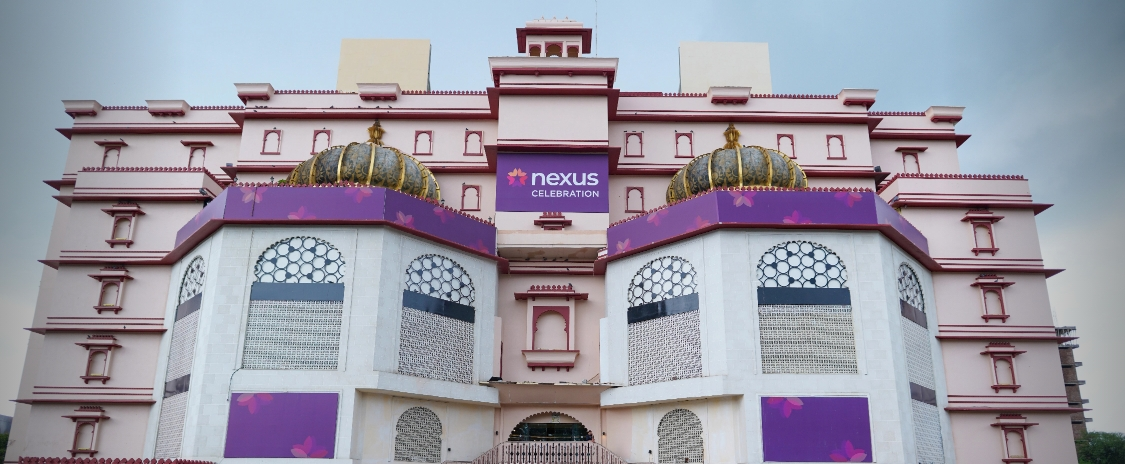
- Location: Udaipur, Rajasthan, India
- Coordinates: 24.58°N 73.68°E
- Address: Opposite Devendra Dham, Pulla Bhuwana, Bhuwana, Udaipur, Rajasthan, 313004
- Owner: Nexus Select Trust
- Num. of stores: 140+
- Floor area: 400,000 sq ft (37,000 m^{2})
- Floors: 7
- Parking: 155 Four Wheelers, 754 Two Wheeler
- Website: www.nexusselecttrust.com/nexus-celebration

Nexus Celebration Mall is a shopping mall in Udaipur, India. It is located around 2 km from the Fateh Sagar Lake. The mall is built with a historical theme and houses many utility services including a PVR cinema. It opened its first outlet in December 2010 before the official opening on 2 July 2011. The mall is made with the facade of stone along with 23 water bodies cascading fountains inside the mall. Previously named The Celebration Mall, Blackstone group acquired the mall and brought it under India Nexus Malls portfolio.

== See also ==
- The Blackstone Group
