= Rishabhdeo tehsil =

Tehsil in Udaipur, Rajasthan, India

- Tehsil
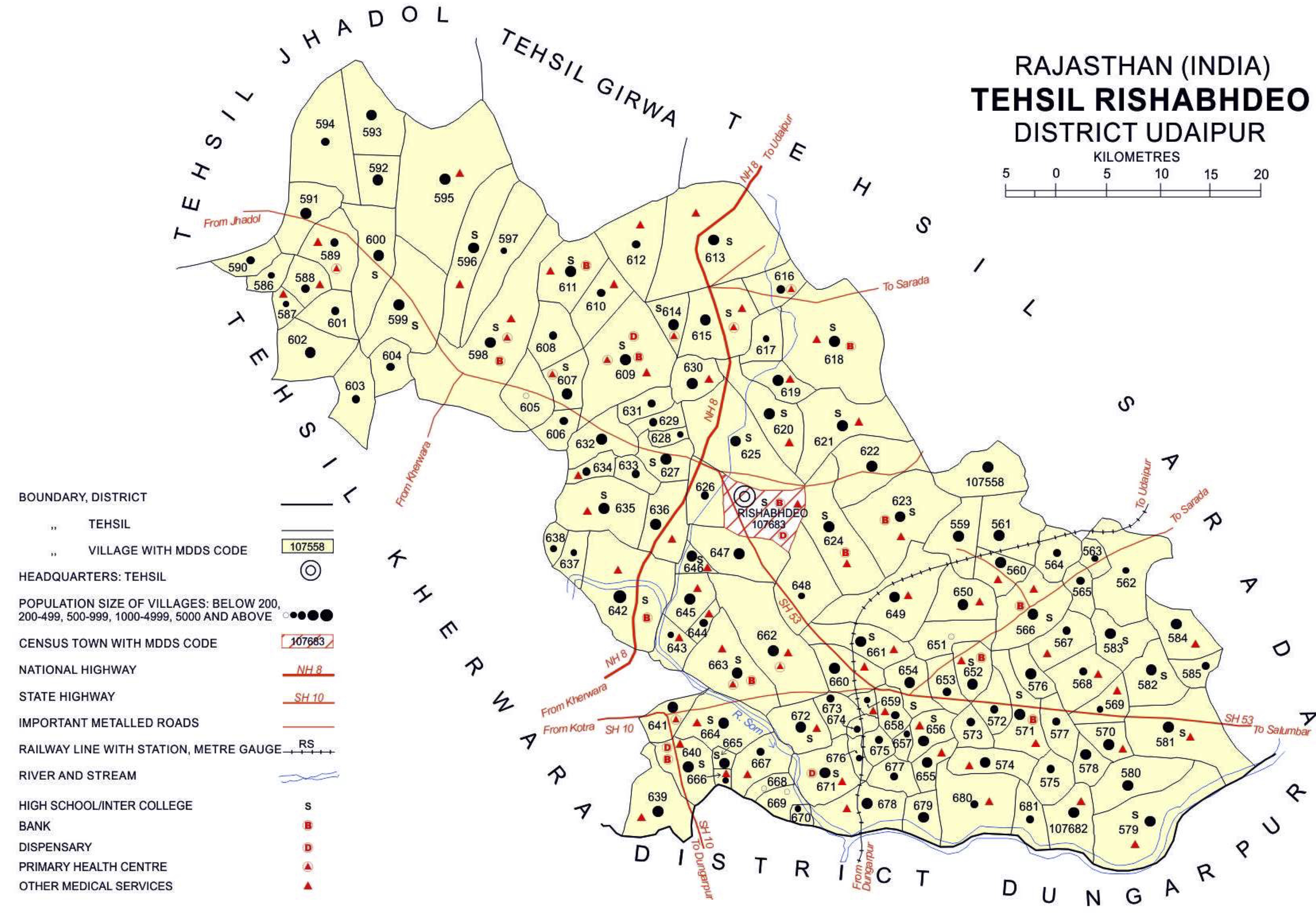
- Rishabhdeo tehsil

- Location of Rishabhdeo tehsil Rishabhdeo tehsil (India)
- Coordinates: 24.076089°N 73.693377°E
- Tehsil seat: Rishabhdeo
- Time zone: Indian Standard Time

Rishabhdeo (also spelt Rishabhdev) is a tehsil of Udaipur district in Rajasthan, India.The tehsil consists of 125 revenue villages and one town. The tehsil headquarter is located in the town of Rishabhdeo.

== History ==
Before the formation of the Republic of India, the territory of present-day Rishabhdeo tehsil was part of the former Udaipur State. With the formation of the United State of Rajasthan (precursor to the state of Rajasthan) in 1948, the new district of Udaipur was constituted which included the area of present-day Rishabhdeo tehsil. Rishabhdeo tehsil was created in 2008 by including 79 villages of Kherwara tehsil and 19 villages of Sarada tehsil.

== Geography ==
The annual average rainfall in Rishabhdeo tehsil is 518 mm, with an average of 26 rainy days per year.

== Demographics ==
The population of the tehsil is 1,72,935, 84% of which is tribal. Because of the large proportion of tribals in its population, the entire Rishabhdeo tehsil is included in the Tribal sub-plan.
