= Ubeshwar Mahadev Temple =

Religious Site

Religion
- Affiliation: Hinduism
- District: Udaipur
- Deity: Ubeshwar Mahadev (Shiva)

Location
- Location: Kundal Ubeshwarji, Udaipur
- State: Rajasthan
- Country: India

Ubeshwar Mahadev Temple (Hindi: उबेश्वर महादेव) is a popular temple of the Lord Shiva in the Udaipur city in the state of Rajasthan, India. This temple is located on a green hill in the Ubeshwar, area of Udaipur. It is a popular temple of the Lord Shiva. Within the premises there is a holy pond (Gangu Kund) for ritual bathing.
