= Bhindar tehsil =

Tehsil in Udaipur, Rajasthan, India

- Tehsil
- Location of Bhindar tehsil Bhindar tehsil (India)
- Coordinates: 24.504057°N 74.186683°E
- Country: India
- State: Rajasthan
- District: Udaipur district
- Tehsil seat: Bhindar

Area
  - Total: 341 km^{2} (132 sq mi)
- Time zone: Indian Standard Time

Bhindar (also spelt Bhinder) is a tehsil of Udaipur district in Rajasthan, India. The tehsil headquarter is located in the town of Bhinder.

== History ==
Before the formation of the Republic of India, the territory of present-day Bhindar tehsil was part of the former Udaipur State. With the formation of the United State of Rajasthan (precursor to the state of Rajasthan) in 1948, the new district of Udaipur was constituted which included the territory of present-day Bhindar tehsil.

In 1959, the sub-tehsil of Bhindar was created within Vallabhnagar tehsil. After a nearly 40-year long struggle by local activists to obtain tehsil status, Bhindar became a tehsil in 2017.

== Geography ==
The area of Bhindar tehsil is 341 square kilometres. The annual average rainfall in the tehsil is 608 mm, with an average of 30 rainy days per year.

16 villages of the tehsil that are in the vicinity of the city of the Udaipur urban area are subject to the jurisdiction urban planning policies of the Udaipur Urban Improvement Trust.
