= Keleshwar Mahadev Temple =

Religion
- Affiliation: Hinduism
- District: Udaipur
- Deity: Keleshwar Mahadev (Shiva)

Location
- Location: Borao Ka Khera, Udaipur
- State: Rajasthan
- Country: India

Keleshwar Mahadev Temple (Hindi: कलेश्वर महादेव मंदिर) is a popular temple of the Lord Shiva in the Borao Ka Khera, Rajasthan. There are a couple of temples built on the bank of Gomti River and it is a prominent picnic and tourist destination.
