= Brahma Dev Sharma =

Indian civil servant and tribal rights activist (1931–2015)

Brahma Dev Sharma (19 June 1931 – 6 December 2015) was an Indian bureaucrat, academic, and social activist known for his advocacy of the rights of Adivasis, Dalits, farmers, and other marginalized communities. A former Indian Administrative Service officer, he played a key role in the development of tribal policy in India, including the conceptualization of the Tribal Sub-Plan, and was instrumental in the drafting of the Panchayats (Extension to Scheduled Areas) Act, 1996 and the Scheduled Tribes and Other Traditional Forest Dwellers (Recognition of Forest Rights) Act, 2006.

== Early life and education ==
Sharma was born on 19 June 1931 in Shahjahanpur, Uttar Pradesh. He obtained a doctorate in mathematics from Banaras Hindu University and began his career as a lecturer at BITS Pilani before joining the Indian Administrative Service in 1956.

== Career ==
=== Collector of Bastar ===
As district collector of Bastar in the 1960s, Sharma rejected a corporate-driven model of development that proposed large-scale pine plantations in tribal lands. He insisted that development must be rooted in the needs and aspirations of the tribal people themselves.

=== Policy initiatives ===
While serving in the Government of India, Sharma conceptualized the Tribal Sub-Plan (TSP), which earmarked funds specifically for tribal areas within development programs. He also served as Vice-Chancellor of the North-Eastern Hill University (1981–1986) and later as Commissioner for Scheduled Castes and Scheduled Tribes (1986–1991), where he authored several influential reports, including contributions to the Bhuria Committee.

Sharma was a key figure in shaping two landmark legislations: the PESA and the Scheduled Tribes and Other Traditional Forest Dwellers (Recognition of Forest Rights) Act, 2006. His work helped embed principles of self-governance and resource rights for tribal communities into law.

== Activism ==
After voluntarily retiring from the IAS in 1981, Sharma became involved in grassroots initiatives. In 1992, he founded the Bharat Jan Andolan, a national movement that represented the rights of peasants, and workers.

Sharma also played a mediator role in several high-stakes situations, including the 2012 release of Bastar district collector Alex Paul Menon, who had been kidnapped by Maoists. He warned the Indian government in 2010 of a "warlike situation" developing in tribal areas due to neglect of constitutional protections.

== Publications ==
=== Journal articles ===
- Sharma, B. Dev (March 1957). "Stresses due to a nucleus of thermo-elastic strain (i) in an infinite elastic solid with spherical cavity and (ii) in a solid elastic sphere". Zeitschrift für angewandte Mathematik und Physik. 8 (2): 142–150. Bibcode:1957ZaMP....8..142D. doi:10.1007/BF01590609.

=== Books ===
- The Web of Poverty
- Tribal Development: The Concept and the Frame, and
- Dalits Betrayed, among others.

== Death ==
Sharma died on 6 December 2015 at his home in Gwalior at the age of 86.

== See also ==
- Tribal Sub-Plan
