= Kharol =

Kharol are a Hindu Rajput caste found in the state of Rajasthan in India.

== History and origin ==
The Kharol community is historically associated with the occupation of salt making. In the local language, Rajasthani, the word khar means cotton, and a kandera means someone who works with cotton. They are from Rajput ancestry. They are said to have migrated from Delhi to Ajmer. The community speak the Mewari dialect.

== Present circumstances ==
The community are divided into two endogamous divisions, namely the Rajput and Todwala. These two divisions are sub-divided gotras, and they maintain gotra exogamy.The Kharol are no longer involved in their traditional occupation of manufacturing salt, and are mainly involved in agriculture, being landless labourers.
