= Bachar, Udaipur =

Village in Udaipur, Rajasthan

Bachar Village is a village in Udaipur district in the Indian state of Rajasthan. As per Population Census 2011, the total population of Bachar is 1820, literacy rate of Bachar Village was 34.7% which is very low compared to 66.11% of Rajasthan.

== Education ==
Bachar is nearby to deemed and private school and colleges which includes Geetanjali College of Pharmaceutical Studies and Advent Institute of Management Studies.
