= Phalasia =

Phalasiya
- village
- Interactive map of Phalasiya
- Coordinates: 24°15′N 73°23′E
- Country: India
- State: Rajasthan
- District: Udaipur

Government
  - Body: Gram Panchayat

Population (2009)
  - Total: 5,000

Languages
  - Official: Hindi
- Time zone: UTC+5:30 (IST)
- PIN: 313701
- Telephone code: 02959
- Vehicle registration: RJ27
- Coastline: 0 kilometres (0 mi)
- Nearest city: udaipur
- Lok Sabha constituency: Phalasia
- Civic agency: Gram Panchayat
- Climate: Seasonal (Köppen)
- Avg. summer temperature: 42 °C (108 °F)
- Avg. winter temperature: 25 °C (77 °F)

Phalasia is a village in Rajasthan, India, approximately 80 kilometers from Udaipur. The main places to visit in Phalasia are Lapni saat, Nagmala Talab.

The people of Phalasia village are very religious. Some of famous temples in phalasia - 1. Shree 1008 Padamprabhu Jain Mandir 2. Ambey mata mandir 3. Paaleshwar Mahadev 4. Sheetala mataji Mandir 5. Thakurji mandir 6. Vijasan Mataji

The main source of income here is farming.

The tehsil headquarter is Jhadol .

As of 2009, the population is estimated to be 5000.

Phalasia Pin Code
