= Bhainsrorgarh =

Fort in Chittorgarh, India

Coordinates: 24°58′N 75°33′E

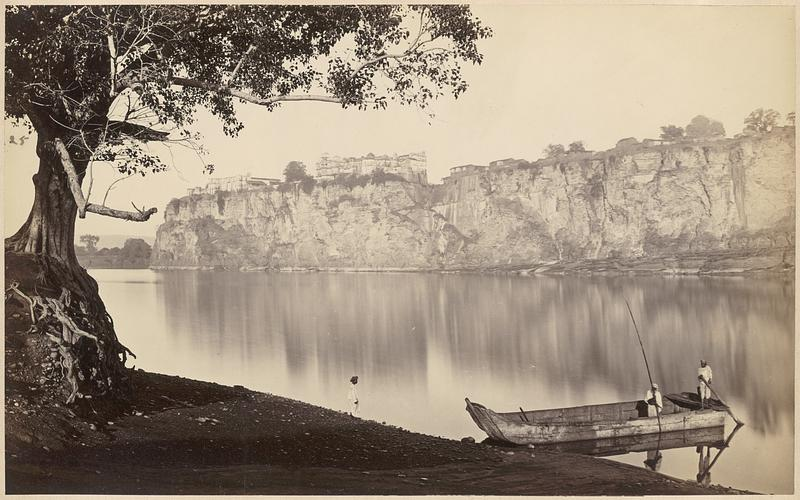
Bhainsrorgarh

Bhainsrorgarh Fort or Bhainsror Fort is an ancient fort that has become a major tourist spot in the state of Rajasthan, India.

The nearest City is Rawatbhata, 7 km from Bhainsror. Distances from other major places are:

| City | km |
|---|---|
| Kota | 50 |
| Bundi | 90 |
| Chittor | 125 |
| Bhilwara | 150 |
| Jaipur | 300 |
| Jodhpur | 425 |
| Indore | 370 |
| Ujjain | 320 |
| New Delhi | 550 |

== History ==
Bhainsrorgarh is an impregnable fort, the surrounding region being inhabited from at least the 2nd century BC. The fort was originally built by a Baniya merchant named Bhainsa Sah and a Charan trader called Rora Charan who built it in order to protect their caravans from bandits. The fort owes its name to the conjunction of Bhansa and Rora. It is dramatically positioned between two rivers, the Chambal and Bamani. It had passed through the hands of several clans before becoming the seat of a premier noble of Mewar, the large region around Udaipur and Princely State of the Sisodia clan. It contains five tanks, temples to Devi Bhim Chauri, Shiva, and Ganesh and a palace that is for rent.

A fortified outpost of the kingdom of Mewar that included Chittorgarh and Udaipur, Bhainsrorgarh is located 235 kilometers northeast of Udaipur and 50 kilometers south of Kota and has a remarkable history. Built by Rawat Lal Singh (second son of Rawat Kesri Singh of Salumber), Bhainsrorgarh was granted as a jagir ( fiefdom ) by Maharana Jagat Singh II of Mewar in 1741 A.D.

Bhainsrorgarh held great importance to the Chundawat clan of Sisodia Rajputs, as it was granted to Rao Chunda after he renounced the Mewar throne for his yet to be born younger brother. As the eldest son of Rana Lakha, then ruler of Mewar, Chunda Ji was the heir apparent to the throne of Chittor. The Chief of Bhainsrorgarh was counted among the 16 first class nobles of Mewar and was conferred the title of Rawat by Maharana of Mewar. After the great Mughals kings into medieval India, the Turks held it briefly but Banbir, son of Maldeo re-captured it from them in the time of Rana Hamir around AD 1330. When Kunwar Shakti Singh saved his brother Shakti Singh rescues the Rana Pratap from the chasing Mughals in the Battle of Haldighati, the Maharana awarded Bhainsror to Shakta's sons and it became a headquarters of the Shaktawat clan. Around 1741, Bhainsror was awarded to Rawat Lal Singh for killing an enemy of the Maharana Jagat Singh II of Udaipur.

The present fort is around 260 years old and was built in the 1740s. Bhainsrorgarh fort has now been converted into a luxury heritage hotel run by the erstwhile royal family and is a very popular tourist spot for tourists from all around the world.

== Architecture ==
Several excellent idols (sculptures) are mentioned in old architectural texts as being here but they may have been sent to museums. One, a sleeping Vishnu, was considered by an early British archaeologist to be the most beautiful of all Hindu sculptures.

== See also ==
- Bhensrodgarh Wildlife Sanctuary
