= Kanor tehsil =

Tehsil in Udaipur, Rajasthan, India

- Tehsil
- Location of Kanor tehsil Kanor tehsil (India)
- Coordinates: 24.436448°N 74.263154°E
- Tehsil seat: Kanor

Area
  - Total: 259 km^{2} (100 sq mi)
- Time zone: Indian Standard Time

Kanor (also spelt Kanore) is a tehsil of Udaipur district in Rajasthan, India. As of April 2019, it is the 15th tehsil of Udaipur district and the youngest one, having been formed in 2018.

== History ==
Before the formation of the Republic of India, the territory of present-day Kanor tehsil was part of the former Udaipur State. With the formation of the United State of Rajasthan (precursor to the state of Rajasthan) in 1948, the new district of Udaipur was constituted which included the territory of present-day Kanor tehsil.

The area of Kanor tehsil for formerly part of Bhindar tehsil (2017–2018) and Vallabhnagar tehsil (1948–2017). It came into being as a tehsil in 2018.

== Geography ==
The area of Kanor tehsil is 259 square kilometres. The annual average rainfall in the tehsil is 608 mm, with an average of 30 rainy days per year.
