= Vallabhnagar tehsil =

Tehsil in Udaipur, Rajasthan, India

- Tehsil
- Location of Vallabhnagar tehsil Vallabhnagar tehsil (India)
- Coordinates: 24.673031°N 74.003312°E

Area
  - Total: 383 km^{2} (148 sq mi)
- Time zone: Indian Standard Time

Vallabhnagar is a tehsil of Udaipur district in Rajasthan, India.

== History ==
Before the formation of the Republic of India, the territory of present-day Vallabhnagar tehsil was part of the former Udaipur State. With the formation of the United State of Rajasthan (precursor to the state of Rajasthan) in 1948, the new district of Udaipur was constituted which included Vallabhnagar tehsil.

In 2017, Bhindar tehsil, which had been a sub-tehsil of Vallabhnagar tehsil since 1959, was declared to be a separate tehsil. This restructuring reduced Vallabhnagar tehsil's area from 983 square kilometers to 383 square kilometers.

== Geography ==
The area of Vallabhnagar tehsil is 539 square kilometres. The annual average rainfall in Vallabhnagar tehsil is 608 mm, with an average of 30 rainy days per year.
