= Bhuwana =

- Suburb/Neighbourhood
- Location in Udaipur, Rajasthan, India Bhuwana (India)
- Coordinates: 24°36′52.8408″N 73°42′24.0366″E
- Country: India
- State: Rajasthan
- Metro: Udaipur

Languages
  - Official: Hindi, Rajasthani,
- Time zone: UTC+5:30 (IST)
- Telephone code: 0294
- Vehicle registration: RJ 27

Bhuwana is a census town in the Girwa tehsil of Udaipur district, Rajasthan. It is situated on the Udaipur-Nathdwara highway, around 4 km from the city center, 2 km from Bargaon and around 387 km from the state capital Jaipur.

In February 2023, an elevated road was planned to Udaipur at a cost of Rs.90 crore.

== Demographics ==
Mewadi and Hindi are the local language, but people knowing English are also commonly available. Bhuwana has population of 17,665 (in 2011), of which 9,168 are males while 8,497 are females.

== Schools ==
- Govt. Higher Secondary School
- Jyoti Sr. Secondary School
- Jaideep Sr. Secondary School
- Maharshi Dadhichya Ups
- G.U.P.S.Ramnagar
- G.U.P.S Raanwadi
- NBS U.P.S.
- Shiv Public U.P.S., Chitrakutnagar
