= Semari tehsil =

Tehsil in Salumbar, Rajasthan, India

Semari
- tehsil
- Location in Rajasthan, India Semari (India)
- Coordinates: 24.0555°N 73.8566°E
- Country: India
- State: Rajasthan
- District: Salumbar

Population
  - Total: 105,686
- Time zone: UTC+5:30 (IST)
- Postal code: 313903

Semari is a tehsil of Salumbar district in Rajasthan, India. The administrative headquarter of the tehsil is located in the town of Semari.

Before the formation of the Republic of India, the territory of present-day Semari tehsil was part of the former Udaipur State. With the formation of the United State of Rajasthan (precursor to the state of Rajasthan) in 1948, the new district of Udaipur was constituted which included the territory of present-day Semari tehsil.

The area of Semari tehsil was formerly a part of Sarada tehsil. In 2012, Semari was established as a sub-tehsil of Sarada tehsil and, shortly thereafter, Semari tehsil was established on 17 April 2013.
