= Gogunda tehsil =

Tehsil in Udaipur, Rajasthan, India

- Tehsil
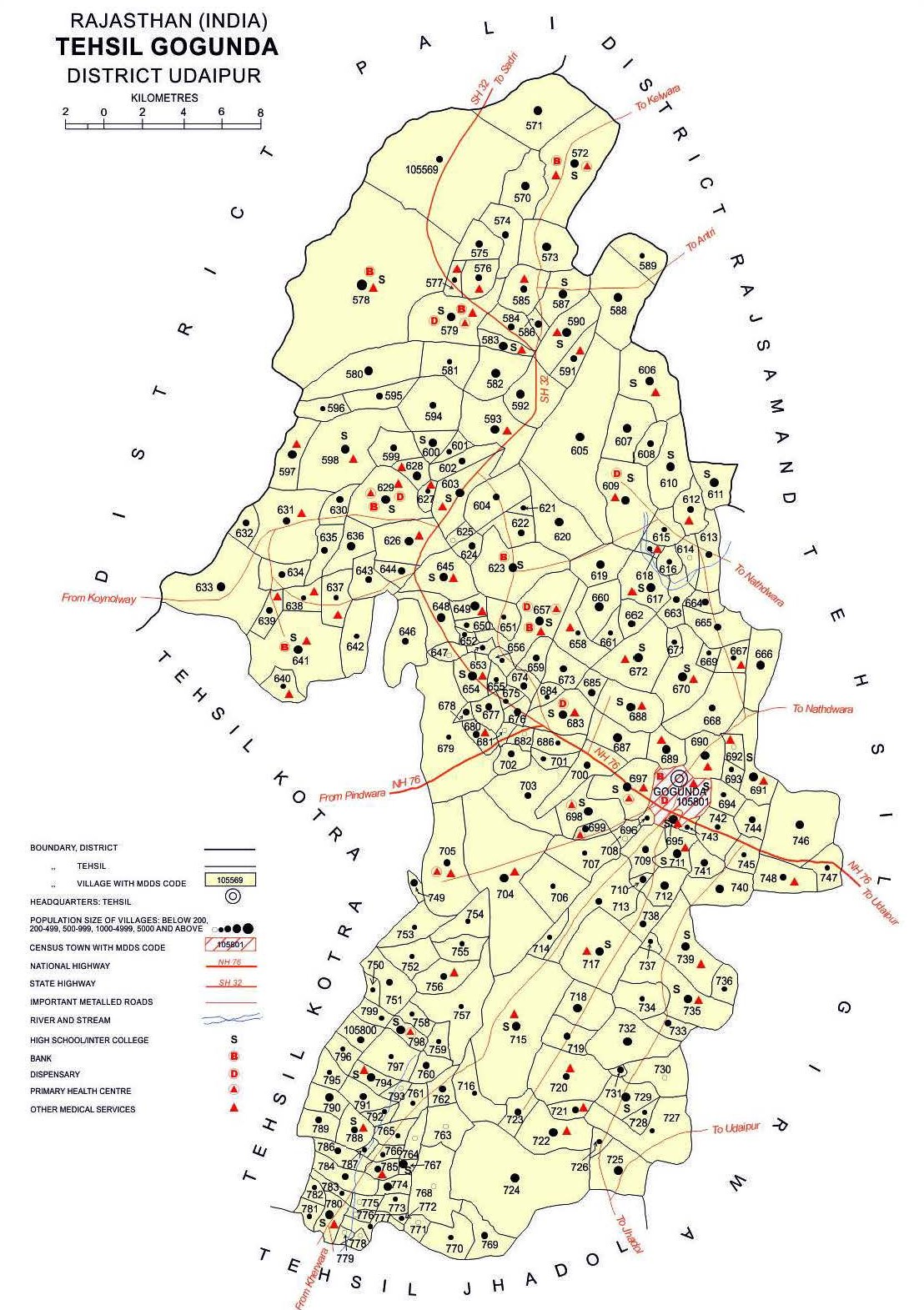
- Gogunda tehsil

- Location of Gogunda tehsil Gogunda tehsil (India)
- Coordinates: 24.752163°N 73.527019°E
- Tehsil: Gogunda

Area
  - Total: 1,110 km^{2} (430 sq mi)

Population (2011)
  - Total: 214,948
  - Density: 194/km^{2} (502/sq mi)
- Time zone: Indian Standard Time

Gogunda is a tehsil of Udaipur district in Rajasthan, India. The tehsil consists of 232 revenue villages, 45 panchayats, and 1 census town. The tehsil headquarter is located in the town of Gogunda.

== History ==
The tehsil of Gogunda was newly formed in the 1951-61 period, constituted of out of villages of the former entire Saira tehsil, one village of Phalasia tehsil, and two villages of Girwa tehsil (the tehsils of Saira and Phalasia are no longer in existence). In 2012, Saira was declared to be a sub-tehsil of Gogunda.

== Geography ==
The area of Gogunda tehsil is 1,009 square kilometres. The tehsil is bordered by Pali district on the northwest, Rajsamand district on the northeast, Kotra tehsil on the southwest, Jhadol tehsil on the south, and Girwa tehsil on the southeast. Major highways in the tehsil are National Highway 27 and State Highway 32. The annual average rainfall in Gogunda tehsil is 633 mm, with an average of 33 rainy days per year.

== Demographics ==
The population of Gogunda tehsil is 2,14,948, as per the 2011 census, which consists of 1,09,673 men (51%) and 1,05,275 women (49%). 96% of the population of the tehsil is rural and the literacy rate of the tehsil is 42%. Hindi and Mewari are the predominant languages used in the tehsil, these two languages being the mother tongue for 49% and 43% respectively of the population of the tehsil.

Because of its predominant scheduled tribe population, Gogunda tehsil has been designated a scheduled area which allows special protection of tribal culture and other interests.

== Economy ==
Agriculture and migratory labour are the most significant sources of income in Gogunda.
