= Jhadoli =

- village
- Country: India
- State: Rajasthan
- District: Sirohi

Languages
  - Official: Hindi
- Time zone: UTC+5:30 (IST)

Jhadoli is a small village/hamlet in Pindwara tehsil in Sirohi district of Rajasthan, India. It comes under Pindwara panchayat samiti.

It has population of 7460 (Male-3744, Female-3716) and people mainly dependent on own small scale business, farming and dairy.

It comes under Jodhpur Division of the state. It is located 26 km to the east of District headquarters Sirohi. 425 km from State capital Jaipur.

Cities near to Village are: Pindwara - 5 km, Sirohi - 20 km, Sumerpur - 60 km, Sheoganj 57 km, Udaipur - 100 km, Ahmedabad - 250 km.

Nearby Airports are: Dabok Airport - 110 km, Jodhpur Airport - 200 km, Ahmedabad Airport - 245 km, Vadodara Airport - 335 km.

Nearby Tourist Places are : Mount Abu - 60 km, Kumbhalgarh - 70 km, Ambaji - 61 km, Ranakpur - 70 km.

Near By Railway Station are : Sirohi Road (SOH) - 1 km, Abu Road (ABR) - 40 km.
