= Sarada tehsil =

Tehsil in Udaipur, Rajasthan, India

- Tehsil
- Location of Sarada tehsil Sarada tehsil (India)
- Coordinates: 24.076089°N 73.693377°E
- Tehsil seat: Sarada village
- Time zone: Indian Standard Time

Sarada (also spelt Sarara) is a tehsil of Salumbar district in Rajasthan, India. It consists of 152 villages and 3 towns (Bhalariya, Newa Talai, and Chawand). The tehsil headquarter is located in the village of Sarada.

Before the formation of the Republic of India, the territory of present-day Sarada tehsil was part of the former Udaipur State. With the formation of the United State of Rajasthan (precursor to the state of Rajasthan) in 1948, the new district of Udaipur was constituted which included the area of present-day Sarada tehsil. In 2013, Sarada tehsil was sub-divided into two parts, with Semari tehsil being established as an independent tehsil, containing areas formerly under Sarada.

The area of the tehsil is 776 square kilometres. The annual average rainfall in Sarada tehsil is 537 mm, with an average of 27 rainy days per year.
