= Bhinder =

- Town
- Location in Rajasthan, India
- Coordinates: 24.502734°N 74.188368°E
- Country: India
- State: Rajasthan
- District: Udaipur
- Founder: Rawat Shakti Singh

Government
  - Body: Nagar Palika Bhinder

Area
  - Total: 3.89 km^{2} (1.50 sq mi)
- Elevation: 469 m (1,539 ft)

Population (2011)
  - Total: 17,777
  - Density: 4,595.9/km^{2} (11,903/sq mi)

Languages
  - Official: Hindi
- Time zone: UTC+5:30 (IST)
- Postal code: 313603

Bhinder or Bhindar is a town in Udaipur District, that is located 315 km (196 mi) from the state's main city Jaipur. Bhinder borders the Chittorgarh District in Rajasthan and is located 58 kilometres (36 mi) south-east of Udaipur. Notable tourist sites nearby include Sita Mata Wildlife Sanctuary, Jaisamand Sanctuary, and Jaisamand Lake. Bhinder is surrounded by four lakes.

The closest airport is Maharana Pratap Airport and the nearest railway station is at Udaipur.

The city is divided into 20 wards for which elections are held every five years.

Postal code: 313603

Bhinder Municipality has total administration over 3,605 houses to which it supplies basic amenities like water and sewerage. It is also authorized to build roads within Municipality limits and impose taxes on properties coming under its jurisdiction.

== Demographics ==
The Bhinder Municipality has a population of 17,878. Approximately 9,081 are males and 8,797 are females.

According to the 2011 Census of India, the population is 17,878, of which 9,081 are males while 8,797 are females as per the 2011 census report. The population of children aged 0-6 is 2,226 which is 12.45% of the total population of Bhinder (M). The female sex ratio is 969 against the state average of 928. Moreover, the child sex ratio in Bhinder is around 970 compared to the Rajasthan state average of 888. The literacy rate of Bhinder city is 78.03%, higher than the state average of 66.11%. In Bhinder, male literacy is around 88.66% while the female literacy rate is 67.06%. The annual population growth rate is +1.05%. Scheduled Caste (SC) constitutes 12.29% while Schedule Tribes (ST) was 7.41% of the total population in Bhinder (M).

Hindu: 73.71%, Muslim: 15.97%, Jain: 10.20%, Others: 0.08%, Christian: 0.04%.

== Employment ==
According to the townwide census, 35% of the total population is employed. The workforce is 79% male, 21% female, with 85% of all workers being employed full-time. As of 2026.

== History ==
The village of Bhindar was granted to Maharaj Shakti Singh by his elder brother Maharana Pratap, ruler of Mewar, in 1578 as a gift for his assistance in the Battle of Haldighati. Bhindar is close to several places of historical importance, including the Sitamata sanctuary, Chittaurgarh, Bambora, Jagat, and Jaisamand. The village of Bhindar is also famous for its artistic swords, gold and silver jewelry, cloth, and miniature paintings.
