= Alex Paul Menon =

Indian civil servant

Alex Paul Menon is an Indian Administrative Services officer of 2006 batch. He was kidnapped by Maoist rebels in Chhattisgarh state in 2012 and freed after 12 days of captivity. He is currently posted as Development Commissioner of MEPZ Special Economic Zone which Includes TAP (Tamil Nadu, Andaman Nicobar Islands, Pondicherry ) Region .

== Early life ==
Alex Paul Menon was named after famous politician V. K. Krishna Menon by his father who was affiliated with Indian National Congress. Mr. Alex Menon did electronics engineering from Madurai Kamaraj University and earned a master's degree in public policy.

== Career ==
Menon started his career in 2007 working at Govt of Chhattisgarh as an IAS officer.

== Kidnap ==
On April 21, 2012, Menon attended a meeting of tribal villagers to hear about their problems and developmental needs and to announce the introduction of modern agriculture and horticulture techniques to boost the income of villagers at Majhipara, a Sukma village. While he was attending the meeting, the rebels killed two security guards traveling with Menon and kidnapped him taking as a hostage. He was released from captivity on May 3, 2012. Menon is the first collector to have been abducted by the Maoists in Chhattisgarh.
