= Jhadol tehsil =

Tehsil in Udaipur, Rajasthan, India

- Tehsil
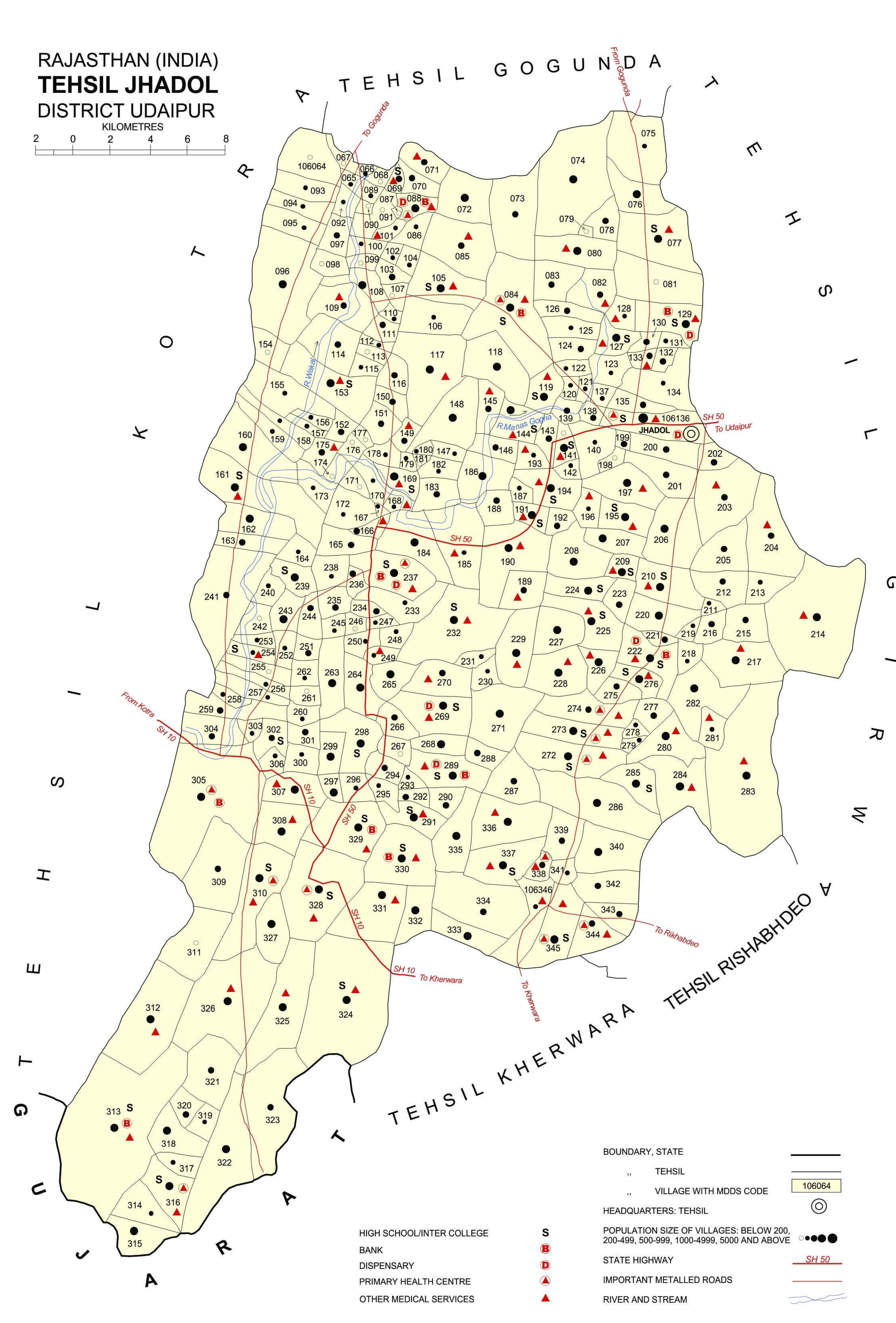
- Jhadol tehsil

- Location of Jhadol tehsil Jhadol tehsil (India)
- Coordinates: 24.3533°N 73.53°E
- Tehsil: Jhadol

Area
  - Total: 1,441.02 km^{2} (556.38 sq mi)

Population (2011)
  - Total: 249,297
  - Density: 173.000/km^{2} (448.069/sq mi)
- Time zone: Indian Standard Time

Jhadol tehsil is an administrative sub-division of Udaipur district in Rajasthan, India. Jhadol tehsil was formerly called Phalasia tehsil. The tehsil consists of 283 revenue villages and 45 panchayats. The tehsil headquarter is located in the village of Jhadol, southwest of the district headquarters, Udaipur.

== Geography ==
The area of Jhadol tehsil is 1,441 square kilometres. The annual average rainfall in the tehsil is 598 mm, with an average of 31 rainy days per year. The tehsil is bordered to the north by Gogunda tehsil, to the east by Girwa tehsil, to the south by Kherwara tehsil and Gujarat state, and to the west by Kotra tehsil. In 2012, Phalasiya was declared as a sub-tehsil of Jhadol.

== Demographics ==
As of the 2011 India census, Jhadol tehsil had a population of 249,297 (126,124 males and 123,173 females). The total number of households was 51,655. Jhadol has an average literacy rate of 42.2 percent, significantly lower than the national average of 74.04 percent.

Because of the large proportion of tribals in its population, Jhadol tehsil in its entirety is included in the Tribal sub-plan. For the same reason, Jhadol tehsil has been designated as a scheduled area which allows special protection of tribal culture and other interests.
