= Bhensrodgarh Wildlife Sanctuary =

Protected wetland in India

- IUCN category IV (habitat/species management area)
- Location within Rajasthan Location within India
- Interactive map of Bhensrodgarh Wildlife Sanctuary
- Location: Chittorgarh district, Rajasthan, India
- Nearest city: Chittorgarh, Rajasthan
- Coordinates: 24°51′50″N 75°31′35″E
- Area: 201.4 km^{2} (77.8 sq mi)
- Established: 1983
- Governing body: Rajasthan State Forest Department

Bhensrodgarh Wildlife Sanctuary or Bhainsrodgarh Wildlife Sanctuary is a wildlife sanctuary situated in the Chittorgarh district in the Indian state of Rajasthan. It covers an area of 201.40 square kilometres (77.76 mi^{2}). It was established in 1983.

== Wildlife ==
The sanctuary is situated on the catchment area of Chambal river. The Rehabilitation centre in the sanctuary hosts panthers, hyenas, jackals, rabbit, sambar deer, wild cat, scorpion, grave scorpion, nilgai, wild boar etc. The Crocodile Point which is part of the Rehabilitation centre hosts Crocodiles which is a major tourist attraction.

According to the wildlife department, the sanctuary currently hosts a population of 10 otters, a significant decline compared to their numbers in the 1970s. There were 10 leopards in the sanctuary according to the 2010 wildlife census. There are 21 villages located inside the sanctuary.

In 2024, it was designated as the second home for Cheetah under the Cheetah Reintroduction plan.
