= Salumbar =

- District
- Salumbar
- Ruthi Rani Ka Mahal Khawarprada-Ka-Mahal Jag Mandir Hadi Rani Mahal
- Location in Rajasthan, India Salumbar (India)
- Coordinates: 24°8′18.777″N 74°2′40.557″E
- Country: India
- State: Rajasthan
- District: Salumbar

Government
  - Type: Salumber Municipal Council

Area
  - Total: 3,094 km^{2} (1,195 sq mi)
- Elevation: 262 m (860 ft)

Population (2011)
  - Total: 850,345
  - Density: 274.8/km^{2} (711.8/sq mi)

Languages
  - Official: Hindi
- Time zone: UTC+5:30 (IST)
- PIN: 313027
- Area code: 02906
- Vehicle registration: RJ-58
- Website: salumber.rajasthan.gov.in

Salumbar is a city in Salumbar district, in the Indian state of Rajasthan. Salumbar is a part of "Mewar" dynasty. Salumbar district is located in southern region of Rajasthan.

== Geography, economy and tourism ==
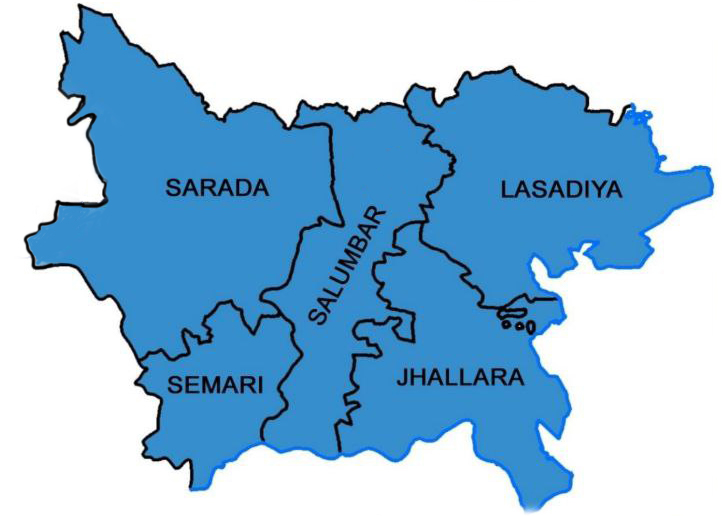
Salumber District Map

Salumbar is located at 24.13°N 74.05°E. It has an average elevation of 262 metres (859 feet).

Salumbar is known for its historical monuments, temples, spiritual atmosphere, and beautiful geographical locations with beautiful Aravali mountain range.

Salumbar is a major trading hub for nearby villages and is known for its gold and silver jewellery.

It has major population of Hindu, Jain, Bohra, and Muslim community.

Tourist places to visit :

- Hadi rani Mahal by the pond Sering
- Sonar mata temple on mountain with panoramic view of city and its surroundings
- Jaisamand lake (Dhebar lake) - India's first and world's oldest historical and second largest artificial fresh water lake in Asia (18 km away from Salumbar)
- Ruthi rani mahal in Jaisamand with panoramic view of Jaisamand lake and mountains
- Jaisamand wildlife sanctuary and safari - Serves as habitat to various types of birds, panthers, leopards, deer, wild boars and crocodiles.

Famous temples - Sonar mata, Bada Ganpati, Palwale Hanuman, Rambola Hanuman, Jageshwar, Bayan mata, Gayatri mandir, Idana mata, Barolji, Gatod ji, and numerous Jain temples.

Masjid - There are several masjid of Bohra and Muslim community.

Historical monuments - Hadirani Mahal, Ruthi rani mahal jaisamand, Jaisamand Lake.

== Demographics ==
As of 2011 India census, Salumbar had a population of 248,337 of which 125,974 are males while 122,363 are females. The Female Sex Ratio in Salumbar Municipality stood as 951, against the state average of 928. Salumbar city had a Literacy rate of 85.82%, which was higher than the state average of 66.11%. Male literacy was 93.78%, and female literacy was 77.56%. There are around 3,392 houses under the Salumbar Municipality administration, where it supplies basic amenities like water and sewerage.

Earlier in 2001, As of 2001 India census, Salumber had a population of 15,862. Males constitute 51% of the population and females 49%. Salumbar has an average literacy rate of 76%, higher than the national average of 59.5%: male literacy is 83%, and female literacy is 68%. In Salumbar, 13% of the population is under 6 years of age.
