= Tribal Sub-Plan =

Planning concept in India

The Tribal Sub-Plan (TSP) is a planning concept used in India to channelize the flow of benefits from the Central government for the development of tribal populations in the states. The motivation for TSPs is to bridge the gap between tribal population and others by accelerating access to education and health services, housing, income generating opportunities, and protection against exploitation and oppression.

The concept of Tribal Sub-Plans was introduced in the Fifth Five Year Plan (1974-1979) and implementation commenced in 17 states and 2 union territories. Areas under Tribal Sub-Plans were gradually increased; at the end of the Ninth Five Year Plan (2002), 23 states or union territories were covered.

Areas included in the Tribal Sub-Plan are blocks or tehsils with 50 percent or more tribal population. The process of TSP development is led by the tribal welfare departments of the respective states.

== See also ==
- Brahma Dev Sharma
