= Urban Improvement Trust =

Form of statutory body in Rajasthan, India

The Urban Improvement Trust (or UIT, नगर विकास न्यास) is a type of statutory body in the state of Rajasthan, India, constituted for the purpose of promoting urban development.

The power to create Urban Improvement Trusts was provided by the Rajasthan Urban Improvement Act, 1959. These improvement trusts were created and entrusted with town improvement schemes, town expansion schemes and provision of essential services, amenities, etc.

== Roles and Responsibility of UITs ==
The roles and responsibility of UITs are as follow:

- Nazul lands (The land situated beyond two miles of the Municipal limits, which has escheated to the State Government and has not already been appropriated by the State Government for any purpose).
- Transfer of private street or square to trust
- Provisions of a drain or water work to replace another situated on a land.
- It has power to turn or close a street or square.
- To make surveys or contribute towards them
- It has power to purchase or lease by agreement
- It has power to restrict any improvement in urban areas
- Restriction on change of use of land and power of *State Government to allow the change in use of land.
- Power to prevent or demolish a building.
- Can order to demolish an illegal building.
- Power to stop improper use of land or buildings in urban areas
- Power to stop building operations
- Encroachment or obstruction on public land.

== Difference between UIT and Nagar Nigam ==
The functions of both of these government bodies are distinctly the same, but there are several factors and points that draw a line between both of these organizations.

Mode of Selection (Members)

- Nagar Nigam— Elective
- UIT— Selective

Periphery of development

- Nagar Nigam— Mostly functions within the city
- UIT— Mostly functions in the Outer regions of the city

Functions

- Nagar Nigam— Town planning, Road Constructions, Development of Basic amenities
- UIT— Maintenance of specific areas such as parks, parking, etc., Provision of important services such as water supply, fire services, etc.

Revenue

- Nagar Nigam— Taxes such as property tax and receives a fixed grant from State Government
- UIT— Doesn’t receive Grants from the government, collect revenue by lease, application for land conversions, etc.

Constitutional Status

- Nagar Nigam— A part of the constitution
- UIT— Not a part of the constitution

== List of UITs ==
This is a list of present working UITs of Rajasthan with their official website, as of 2024:

1. UIT, Abu
2. UIT, Alwar
3. UIT, Barmer
4. UIT, Bhilwara
5. UIT, Chittorgarh
6. UIT, Jaisalmer
7. UIT, Pali
8. UIT, Kota
9. UIT, Udaipur
10. UIT, Sri Ganganagar
11. UIT, Sikar
12. UIT, Sawai Madhopur

== See also ==
- List of urban local bodies in Rajasthan
- List of districts of Rajasthan
