= Gogunda =

- village
- Location in Rajasthan, India Gogunda (India)
- Coordinates: 24°45′0″N 73°31′59″E
- Country: India
- State: Rajasthan
- District: Udaipur
- Elevation: 850 m (2,790 ft)

Population (2001)
  - Total: 7,581

Languages
  - Official: Hindi
- Time zone: UTC+5:30 (IST)
- PIN: 313705
- Telephone code: 02956
- ISO 3166 code: RJ-IN
- Vehicle registration: RJ 27
- Lok Sabha constituency: Udaipur

Gogunda is a town and tehsil headquarters of Gogunda Tehsil in Udaipur district, located about 35 km (22 mi) in north-west from Udaipur city in the Indian state of Rajasthan. It is situated on a high mountain in Aravalli hills and is reached by crossing a difficult mountain pass.

It was formerly classified as a village based on population, and was reclassified as a Census Town in the 2011 Census of India.

== Demographics ==
Gogunda is a Census Town as per the 2011 census with a population of 8,751, of which 4,483 are male (51%) and 4,268 are female (49%). Gogunda has the highest percentage of scheduled castes population (19.53%) to the total population among all towns/cities of Udaipur district.

The literacy rate in the town of Gogunda is 42.52%. Its male literacy rate of 56.07% is the lowest among towns in the Udaipur district.
