= Salumbar district =

- District of Rajasthan
- Location of Salumbar district in Rajasthan
- Country: India
- State: Rajasthan
- Division: Udaipur
- Established: August 2023
- Headquarters: Salumbar

Population
  - Total: 570,775
- Time zone: UTC+05:30 (IST)

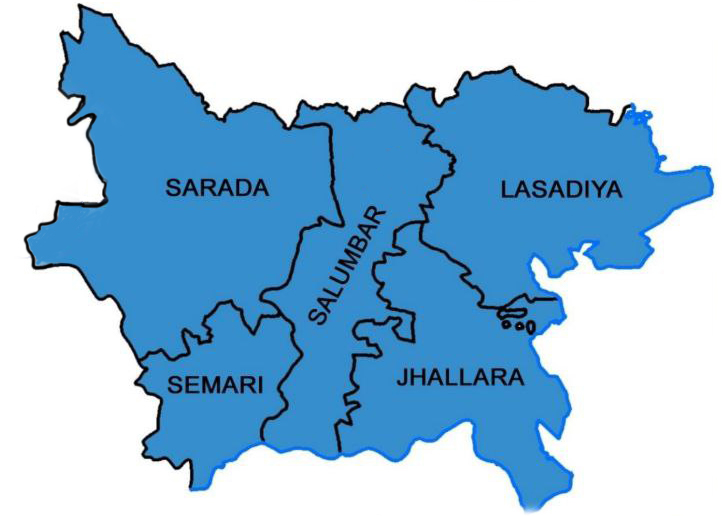
Map of Salumbar District

Salumbar district is a district located in the Indian state of Rajasthan. It is located in the southern Rajasthan near the border with Gujarat. It comprises five Tehsils which were formerly part of Udaipur district - Sarada, Lasadiya, Salumbar, Semari, Jhallara. Salumbar was carved out of erstwhile Udaipur district on 7 August 2023 by Chief Minister Ashok Gelhot.

== Demographics ==
Religions in Salumbar district (2011)
Religion	Percent
Hinduism	96.95%
Jainism	1.61%
Islam	1.27%
Other or not stated	0.17%

Salumbar district has a population of 570,775 as of the 2011 census. 280,412 were women while 290,363 were men. 31,776 lived in urban areas. The district is one of the few places in India where Jains are the second-largest religious community. SC and ST population was 24,628 (4.31%) and 360,065 (63.08%) of the population respectively.

Languages in Salumbar district (2011)
1. Mewari (53.8%)
2. Bhili(Wagdi) (23.8%)
3. Rajasthani (7.61%)
4. Hindi (7.33%)
5. Malvi (4.08%)
6. Others (3.34%)

At the time of the 2011 census, 53.84% of the population spoke Mewari, 23.80% Bhili (Wagdi), 7.61% Rajasthani, 7.33% Hindi and 4.08% Malvi as their first language.
