= Girwa tehsil =

Tehsil in Udaipur, Rajasthan, India

Girwa Girwa
- Tehsil
- Location in Rajasthan, India Girwa (India)
- Coordinates: 24°58′N 73°58′E
- Country: India
- State: Rajasthan
- District: Udaipur

Population
  - Total: 96,735

Languages
  - Official: Hindi, Rajasthani
- Time zone: UTC+5:30 (IST)
- Telephone code: 0294
- Vehicle registration: RJ 27

Girwa is a tehsil of Udaipur district, Rajasthan, India. The administrative headquarter of the tehsil is located in the City of Udaipur.

== History ==
Before the formation of the Republic of India, the territory of present-day Girwa tehsil was part of the former Udaipur State. With the formation of the United State of Rajasthan (precursor to the state of Rajasthan) in 1948, the new district of Udaipur was constituted which included the territory of present-day Badgaon tehsil.

Until 2012, Girwa tehsil included the area of present-day Badgaon tehsil as well. As part of administrative reorganization in 2012, Badgaon tehsil was carved out of Girwa tehsil.

== Geography ==
Girwa tehsil consists of 220 revenue villages which are organized in 60 gram panchayats. The population of the tehsil is 289,070. The area of the tehsil encompasses two panchayat samities - Girwa and Kurawar.

52 villages of Girwa tehsil that are in the vicinity of the city of the Udaipur urban area are subject to the jurisdiction urban planning policies of the Udaipur Urban Improvement Trust.

The annual average rainfall in Girwa tehsil is 608 mm, with an average of 32 rainy days per year.
