= Mewari language =

Rajasthanic Language spoken in Sindh and Rajasthan

Mewari
- मेवाड़ी
- Native to: India
- Region: Mewar
- Ethnicity: Rajasthanis
- Native speakers: 4.21 million (2011 census)
- Language family: Indo-European: Indo-Iranian; Indo-Aryan; Western; Rajasthanic; Mewari
- Writing system: Devanagari

Language codes
- ISO 639-3: mtr
- Glottolog: mewa1249

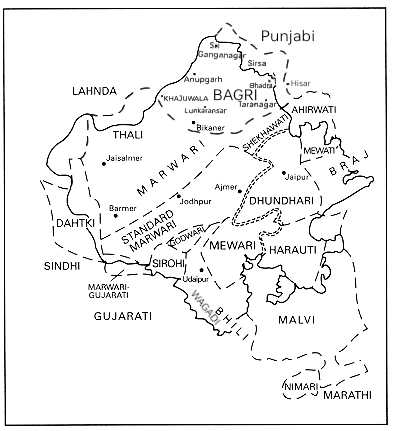
Rajasthani language and geographical distribution of its dialects

Mewari is an Indo-Aryan language of the Rajasthani languages group. It is spoken by about five million speakers in Rajsamand, Bhilwara, Udaipur, Chittorgarh and Pratapgarh districts of Rajasthan state and Mandsaur, Neemuch districts of Madhya Pradesh state of India.

There are 31 consonants, 10 vowels and 2 diphthongs in Mewari. Intonation is prominent. Dental fricative is replaced by glottal stop at initial and medial positions. Inflection and derivation are the forms of word formation. There are two numbers—singular and plural, two genders—masculine and feminine, and three cases—simple, oblique, and vocative. Case marking is partly inflectional and partly postpositional. Concord is of nominative type in the imperfective aspect but ergative in the perfective aspect. Nouns are declined according to their endings. Pronouns are inflected for number, person, and gender. Third person is distinguished not only in gender but also in remote-proximal level. There are three tenses—present, past, and future; and four moods. Adjective are of two types—marked or unmarked. Three participles are there—present, past, and perfect. It has SOV word order.Mewari is a prominent language in Mewar region of Rajasthan.

== See also ==
- Rajasthani language
- List of winners of Sahitya Akademi Awards for writing in Rajasthani language
- List of Rajasthani poets
- List of Indian poets#Rajasthani
