= Udaipur district =

- District of Rajasthan
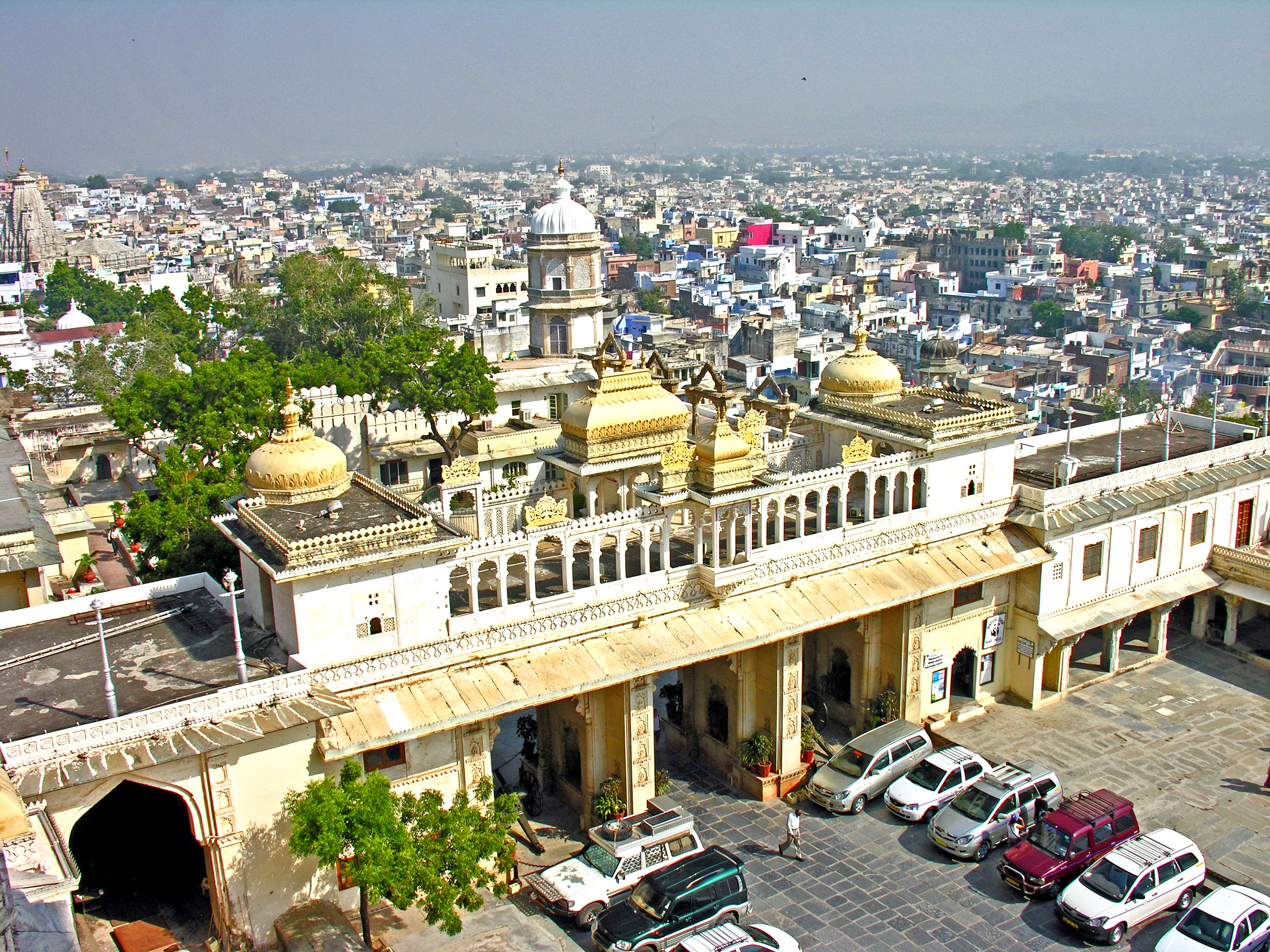
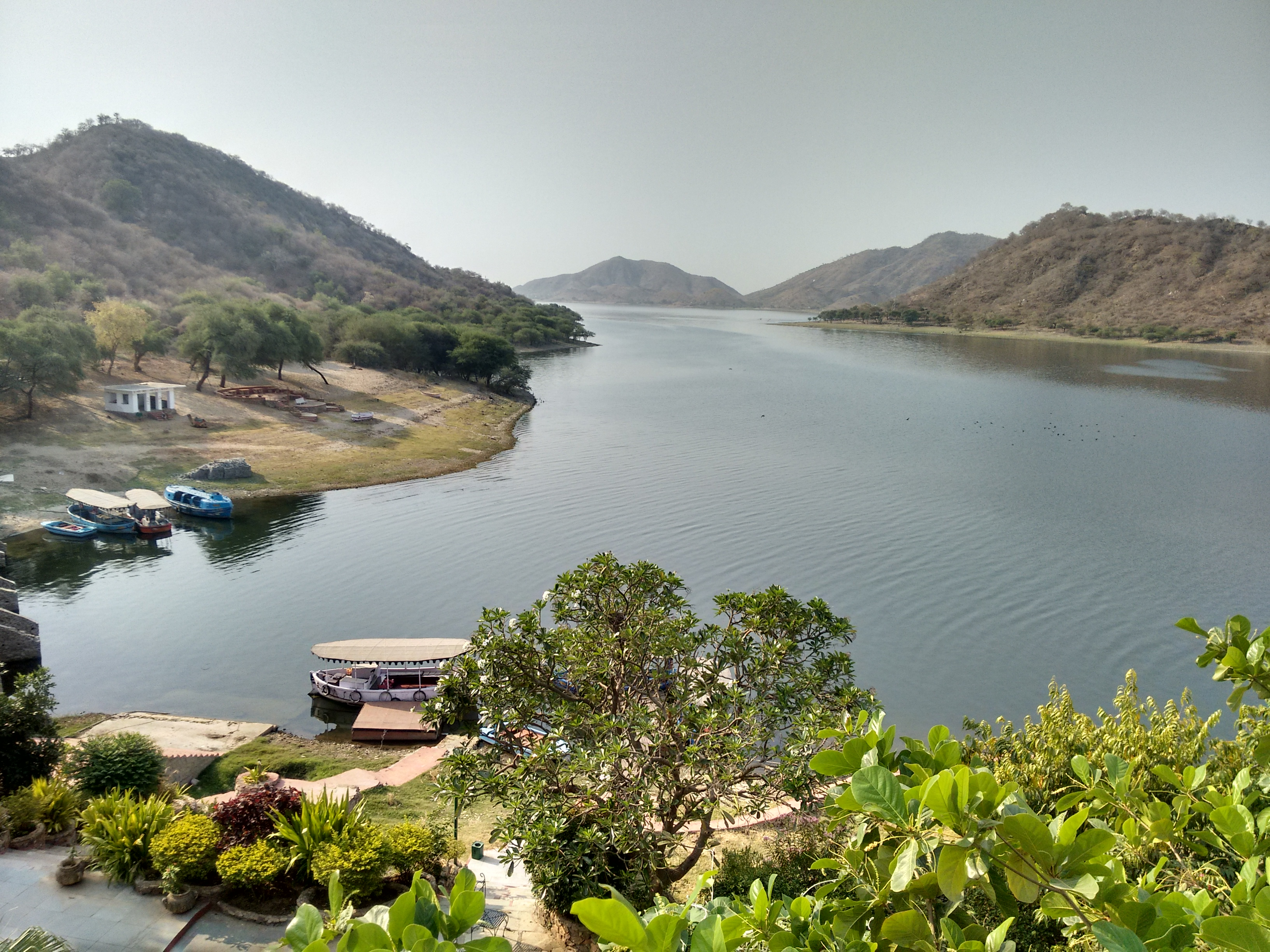
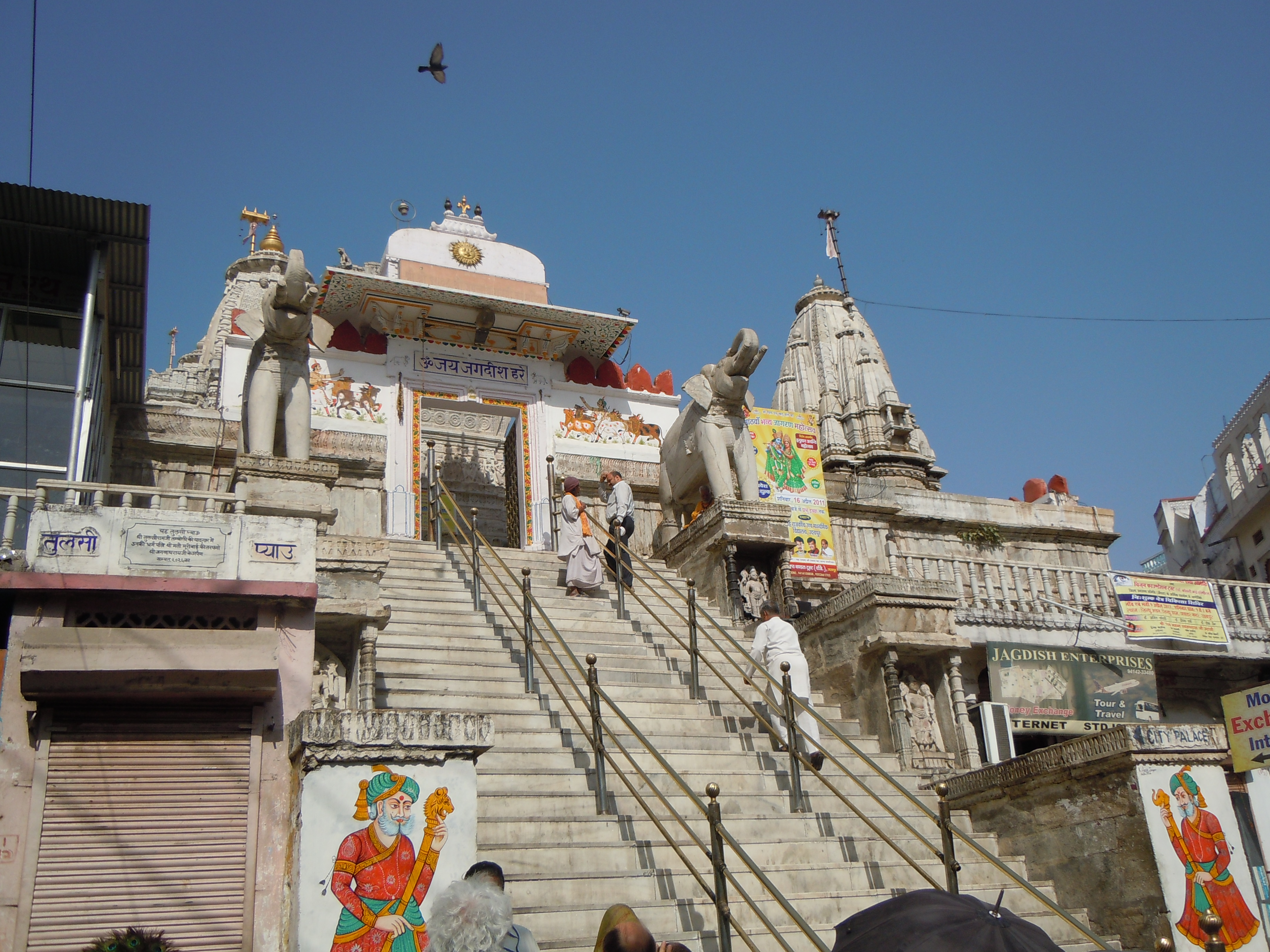
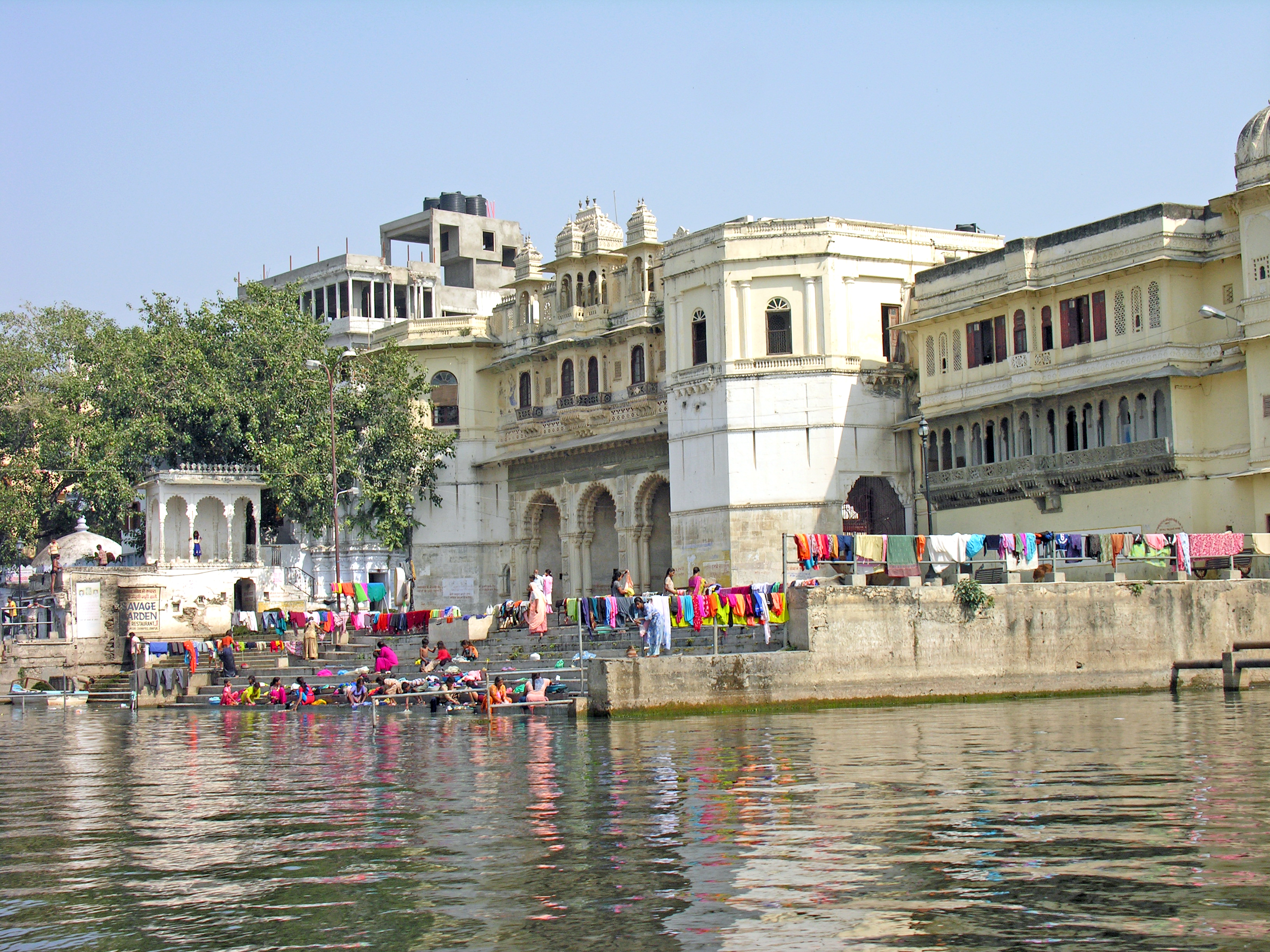
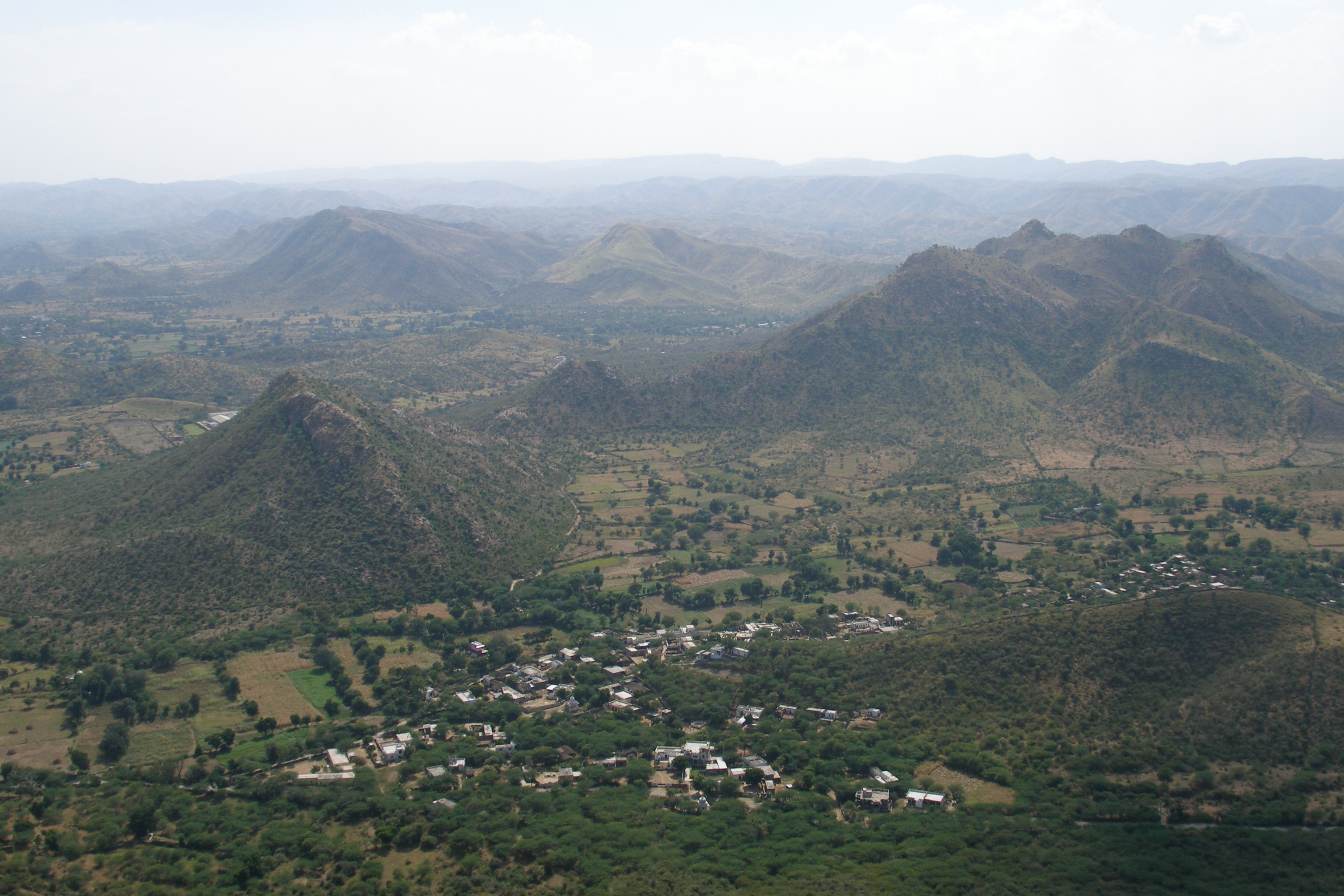
- Clockwise from top-left: View of Udaipur from City Palace, Jaisamand Lake, Ghats at Udaipur, Aravalli Hills, Jagdhish Temple

- Location of Udaipur district in Rajasthan
- Coordinates (Udaipur): 24°23′N 73°37′E
- Country: India
- State: Rajasthan
- Division: Udaipur
- Headquarters: Udaipur
- Tehsils: 1.Badgaon 2.Bhindar 3.Girwa 4.Gogunda 5.Jhadol 6.Kanor 7.Kherwara 8.Kotra 9.Lasadiya 10.Mavli 11.Rishabhdeo 12.Salumbar 13.Semari 14.Sarada 15.Vallabhnagar

Government
  - Lok Sabha constituencies: District spread over 2 constituencies - Udaipur and Chittorgarh
  - Vidhan Sabha constituencies: 9

Area
  - Total: 11,724 km^{2} (4,527 sq mi)

Population (2011)
  - Total: 3,068,420
  - Density: 261.72/km^{2} (677.85/sq mi)
  - Urban: 19.83%

Demographics
  - Literacy: 61.82%
  - Sex ratio: 958

Languages
  - Official: Hindi
  - Regional: Mewari
- Time zone: UTC+05:30 (IST)
- Major highways: National Highways 8, 76
- Average annual precipitation: 554 mm
- Website: udaipur.rajasthan.gov.in

Udaipur district is one of the 50 districts of Rajasthan state in western India. The historic city of Udaipur is the administrative headquarters of the district. The district is part of the Mewar region of Rajasthan.

== History ==
Before Udaipur district was established in independent India, it was a part of former Mewar or Udaipur State, comprising little less than half the portion of the former state.

With the formation of the United State of Rajasthan in 1948, parts of the erstwhile district of Girwa, Khamnor, Rajnagar, Bhim, Magra, Kherwara and Kumbhalgarh, together with the thikanas of Nathdwara, Kankroli, Salumbar (excluding Sayra tehsil), Bhinder, Kanor, Bansi, Bari Sadri, Amet, Sardargarh, Deogarh and Gogunda were combined to constitute the district of Udaipur.

During the decadal period 1951–61, two new tehsils – Nathdwara and Gogunda – were created in the district. In 1991, seven tehsils of Udaipur district (Bhim, Deogarh, Amet, Kumbhalgarh, Rajsamand, Nathdwara and Railmagra) were transferred out of Udaipur district to create the new district of Rajsamand. Since then, several new tehsils have been created by restructuring or dividing existing tehsils; such new tehsils include Rishabhdeo and Lasadiya created in 2008, Badgaon in 2012, Bhindar in 2017, and Kanor in 2018.

== Geography ==
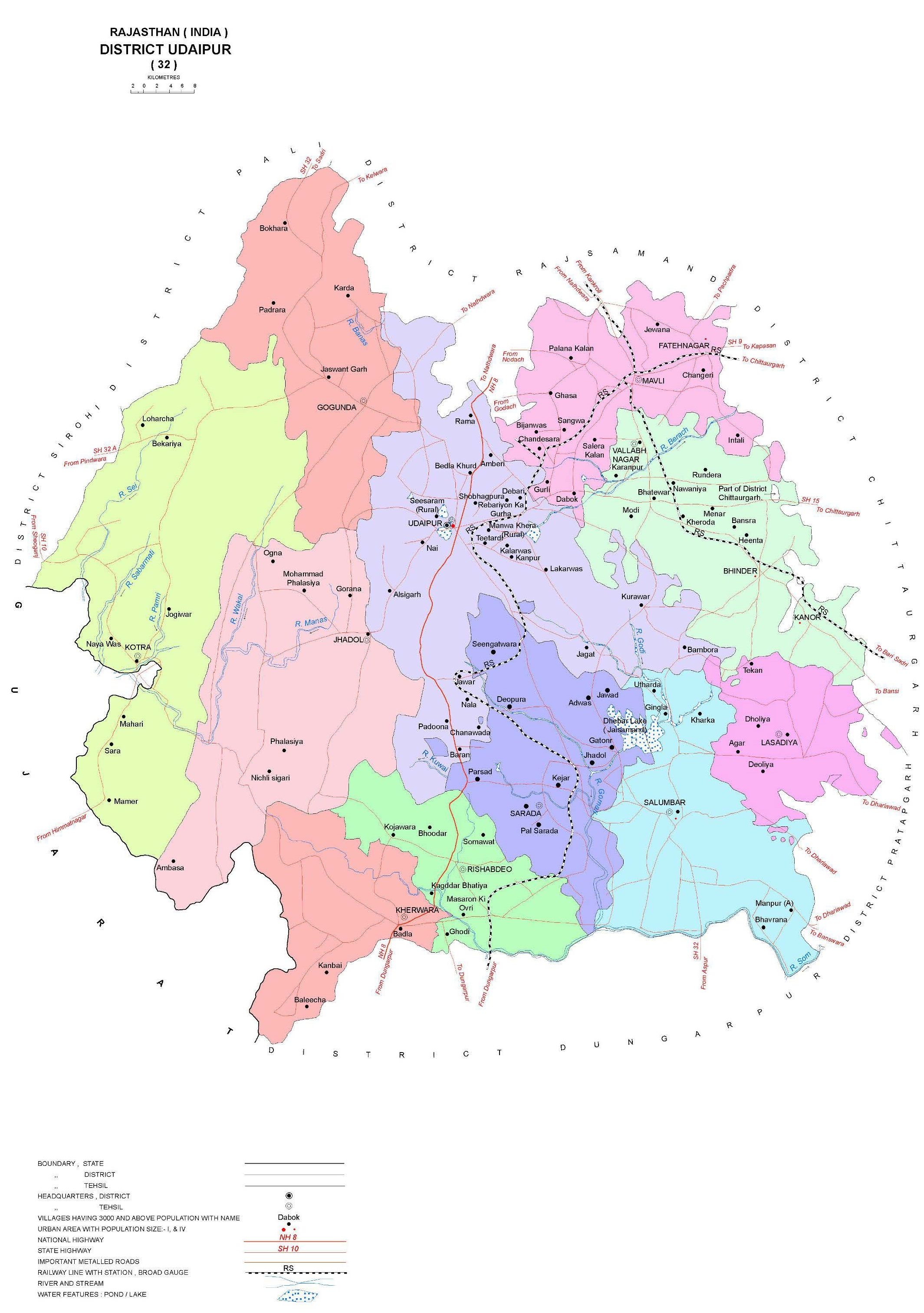
Map of Udaipur district

The area of Udaipur District is 11,724 square kilometres. The district is characterized by hilly terrain, with hills in the west and south, an elevated plateau in the north, and plains in the east. The western part of the district is drained by the Sabarmati, Wakal and Sei rivers, while the southeastern part of the district is drained by Jakham, Gomti and Som rivers.

Udaipur district bounded on the northwest by the Aravalli Range, across which lie the districts of Sirohi and Pali. It is bounded on the north by Rajsamand District, on the east by Chittaurgarh District and Pratapgarh District, on the south by Dungarpur District, and on the southwest by the state of Gujarat. The continental watershed, in the form of the Aravalli Range, passes through the district, with the northeastern part of the district draining to the Bay of Bengal and the southwestern part draining to the Gulf of Khambhat. 47% of the district's area lies in the Mahi basin, 30% in Sabarmati basin, and 23% in the Banas basin. The average annual rainfall of the district is 637 mm.

== Demographics ==
Historical population
Year	Pop.	±% p.a.
1901	347,896	—
1911	430,225	+2.15%
1921	456,868	+0.60%
1931	522,826	+1.36%
1941	623,505	+1.78%
1951	733,014	+1.63%
1961	909,566	+2.18%
1971	1,185,788	+2.69%
1981	1,574,876	+2.88%
1991	1,952,388	+2.17%
2001	2,481,201	+2.43%
2011	3,068,420	+2.15%

Religions in Udaipur district (2011)
Religion	Percent
Hinduism	93.53%
Islam	3.40%
Jainism	2.56%
Other or not stated	0.51%

According to the 2011 census Udaipur district has a population of 3,068,420, roughly equal to the nation of Oman or the US state of Iowa. This gives it a ranking of 118th in India (out of a total of 640). The district has a population density of 242 inhabitants per square kilometre (630/sq mi) . Its population growth rate over the decade 2001–2011 was 23.66%. Udaipur has a sex ratio of 958 females for every 1000 males, and a literacy rate of 62.74%. 19.83% of the population lives in urban areas. Scheduled Castes and Scheduled Tribes make up 6.14% and 49.71% of the population respectively.

Several areas of the district are classified as Scheduled Areas because of large tribal populations in these areas. In rural areas, tribals are 60.29% of the population. Scheduled Areas in the district include the entire tehsils of Kotra, Jhadol, Lasadiya, Salumbar, Sarada, Kherwara, Rishabhdeo, and Gogunda, and portions of Girwa, Mavli, and Vallabhnagar tehsils. Among 2,479 villages in the district, 1,945 villages (78%) are designed as being under the Tribal Sub-Plan.

=== Languages ===
Languages in Udaipur district (2011)
1. Mewari (34.2%)
2. Wagdi (37.0%)
3. Hindi (13.1%)
4. Rajasthani (12.1%)
5. Others (3.64%)

At the time of the 2011 census, 34.19% of the population spoke Mewari, 37.00% Wagdi, 13.12% Hindi and 12.05% Rajasthani as their first language.

== Administrative structure ==
Udaipur district comprises fifteen sub-divisions: Sarada, Girwa, Gogunda, Badgaon, Kherwara, Bhinder, Lasadiya, Mavli, Vallabhnagar, Kotra, Jhadol, Rishabhdev and Salumbar. These sub-divisions are further divided into 18 tehsils. Girwa sub-division consists two tehsils: Girwa and Gogunda. Kherwada sub-division also comprises two tehsils: Kherwada and Rishabhdeo. Each of the sub-divisions, Mavli, Vallabhnagar, Kotda and Jhadol comprise only one tehsil of the same name. Salumbar sub-division comprises three tehsils: Lasadiya, Salumbar and Sarada. There are 20 Panchayat Samitis in the district.

== Economy ==
The economy of Udaipur district is primarily dependent on agriculture with 61.7 percent of workers in the district engaged as cultivators or agricultural labourers.

In 2006 the Ministry of Panchayati Raj named Udaipur one of the country's 250 most backward districts (out of a total of 640). It is one of the twelve districts in Rajasthan currently receiving funds from the Backward Regions Grant Fund Programme (BRGF).

Udaipur district is rich in mineral resources, and produces greater value of minerals than the rest of the state combined. The important metallic minerals found in the district are ore of copper, lead, zinc and silver. Important non-metallic minerals found in the district are rock phosphate, asbestos, limestone, and marble.

== See also ==
- Tarpal
