= Udaipur City's Five lakes =

Five major lakes in Udaipur, Rajasthan

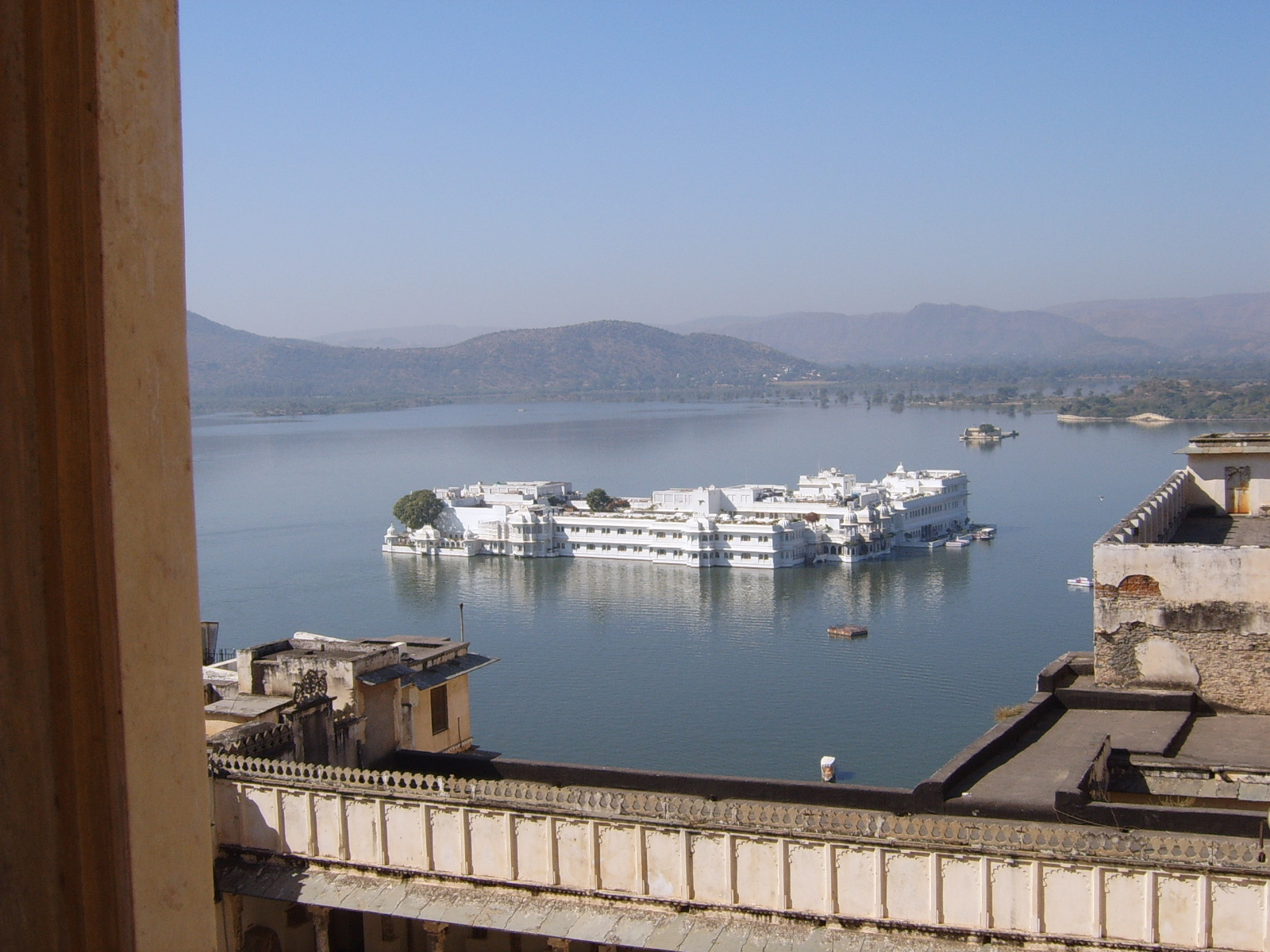
The scene of the Pichola lake palace at Udaipur.

Udaipur city in Rajasthan state has five major lakes (not to be confused with Udaipur Lake in Bihar), as listed below, which are under restoration with funds provided by the National Lake Conservation Plan (NLCP) of the Government of India.

- Fateh Sagar Lake
- Rang Sagar lake
- Pichola lake
- Swaroop Sagar lake
- Dudh Talai lake

== Gallery ==
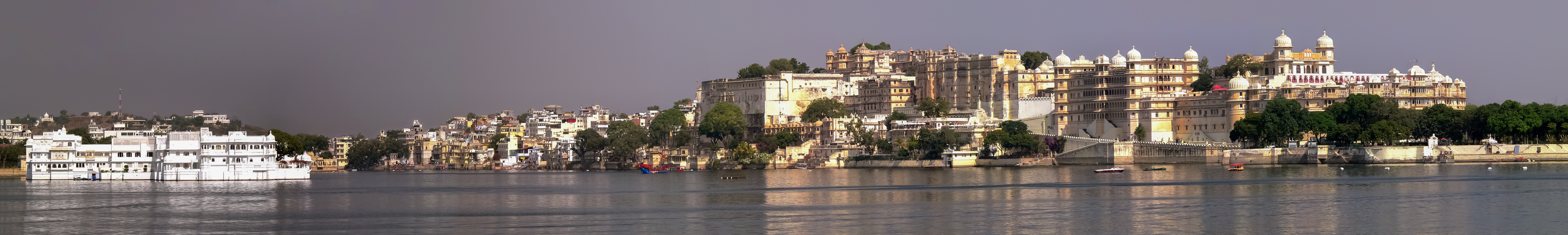
Udaipur Panorama from Jag Mandir Island

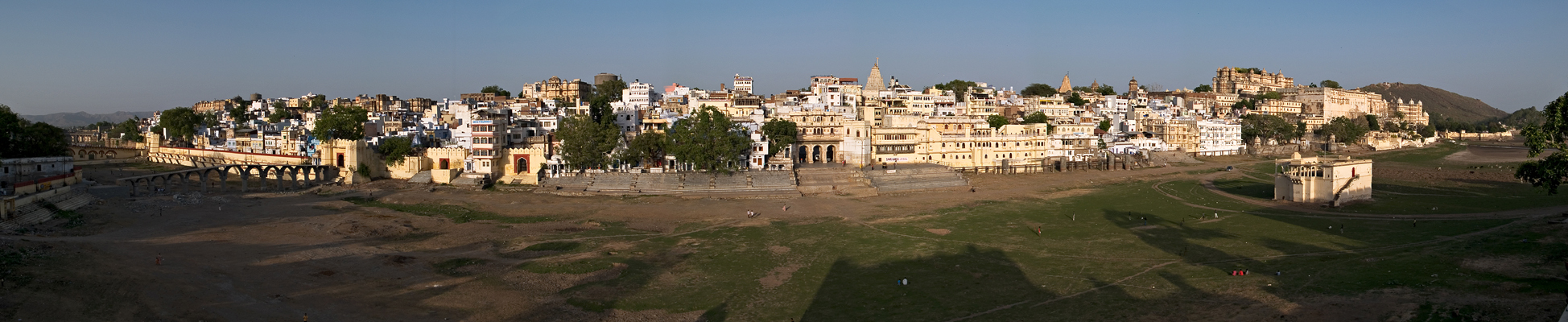
Udaipur Panorama with dried Lake Pichola

== See also ==
- List of lakes of India
