= History of Udaipur =

History of Indian city

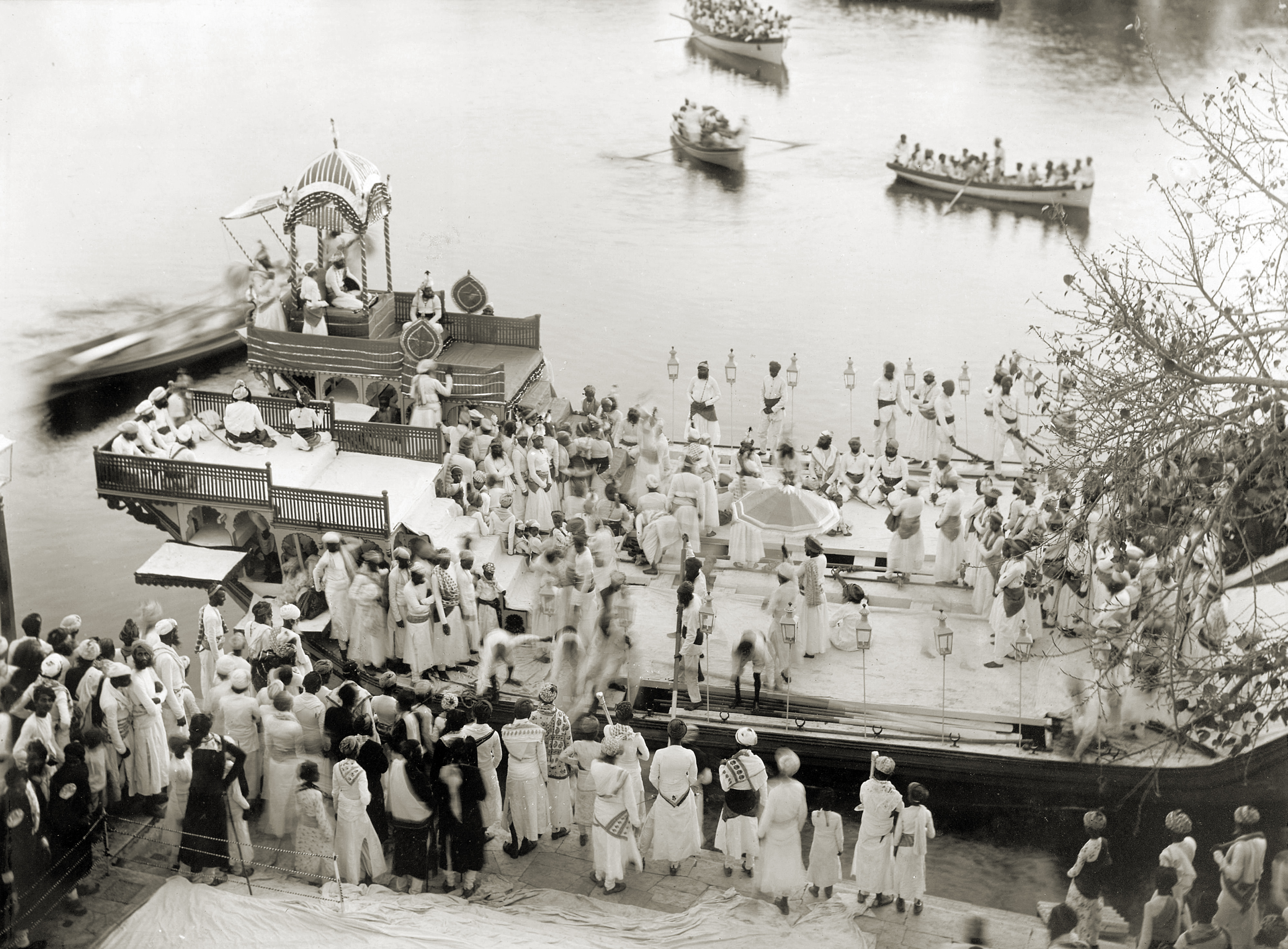
Maharaja Fateh Singh of Udaipur on royal barge, c. 1884-1930

Udaipur, India was founded in 1559, by Maharana Udai Singh II in the fertile circular Girwa Valley to the southwest of Nagda, on the Banas River. The city was established as the new capital of the Mewar kingdom.

== Overview ==
=== Founding of Udaipur ===
The golden period of glory of Chittaurgarh that began with Bappa Rawal (734CE) and continued under Rawals Khumaans to Maharana Sanga (Sangram Singh 1509-1527) lost its prominence after Sanga's death. Sanga was succeeded by his two unworthy sons, during whose brief rule (1527-1536) even the nobles of the kingdom lost interest in its affairs and plunged Chittaurgarh into a period of disaster and decline. The third son of Sanga fortunately salvaged the situation through rational and enterprising rule. The political situation in India was changing fast which the young Maharana had to contend with.

=== Capital relocation ===
The Maharana was also aware of the known ambitious and expansionist designs of the young grandson of Babur, he therefore decided to relocate his capital from venerable but vulnerable Chittaurgarh to a more appropriate location. Founding of Udaipur was one of the greatest achievements of Maharana Udai Singh-a decision that had far-reaching consequence on the future history of this area and its people. Unfortunately, the "story" of its founding is based on what earlier literature including "Veer Vinod" described without interpreting and analyzing it in more rational manner. Subsequent writers, especially "Tourist" literature, have just retold the same thing in their own words without evaluating the facts of the case. The usual story is: Maharana Udai Singh visits Kailashpuri to pay respect and to thank the family deity, Shree Eklingji, on the birth of his grandson-Amar Singh (16 March 1559, Chaitra Shukl Saptami VS 1616). On return to Girwa they have an "Aakhaa-Teej" hunting excursion during which they meet a hermit on the ridge overlooking Pichola Lake, who advises him to establish his capital here and next day the Hermit disappears....Fact of the matter is:

=== 17 rulers of Mewar ===
17 rulers of Mewar had ruled from Ayad town of Girwa Valley (~10th -12th centuries, Ruler #18-34), still earlier (4+1) Rawals ruled from Nagda; so the "Girwa" (& adjoining) valley was already well known to Chittaurgarh rulers who returned to it whenever Chittaurgarh was lost to invaders-the Rajputs or the Muslims!

=== Strategic location ===
The oval amphitheater/arena Girwa Valley (~20 km x 15 km), in which Udaipur was founded, has its long axis in NW-SE extending between ~N24°40̒ - 24°34̒ and E73 °39 ̒ - E73 ° 45 ̒, the undulating but fertile valley floor has elevation of ~580m which is encircled by continuous hill range having MRL of ~ 670-850m that are thickly forested. The valley, at the eastern flank of the Aravalli Hill Range, was fed by two perennial rivers -Ayad and Sisarma, they merge further downstream to form Bedach River.

This strategically located Girwa valley is endowed with a natural defense system, which made it as an ideal location for human settlement. To the west of Girwa Valley, there is a densely forested hill range and to its east is the ~100-km wide Mewar plain followed by Vindhyan plateau Range from Chittaurgarh & beyond Ayad area of Girwa Valley has been inhabited from pre-historic times.

The remains of ~4000 year-old civilization have been excavated at "Dhoolkot" (mud-wall/mound). Dhoolkot is still shrouded in mystery, however! But during historic times Ayad was a prosperous trading town of Mewar dealing with traders of Malwa, Gujarat and north India. Over the period of time it was called by various names viz.: Tambavati Nagri/Aatpur/Aaghatpur/ Ahaad. It was the capital of Mewar for nearly 200 years, [#18 Rawal Narvahan (971 CE) to (# 34) Rawal Kshem Singh (1168 CE); thereafter Rawal Jaitra Singh (1213-1253 CE) ruling from Nagda reclaimed Chittaurgarh.

=== Palace ===
The modest palace of Rawal rulers (Rawalaan ro rawlo रावलां रो रावळो) was located where the present-day Mahasatiya (the great truth-the royal cremation ground) was developed after the demise of Maharana Amar Singh in 1620. This area also has a large (40 x 40 m) elegantly built step-well the "Gangodbhav-Kund" (गंगोद्भव कुण्ड a pre-944CE structure) for community water source and a smaller well with Shiv temple encircled by open corridors nearby. There are temples of Surya, Vishnu, Brahma, Varaha, Chamunda...Besides these Hindu temples, there is also a mosque. To the south of Rawla, there is a very prominent Jain temple complex spread over an area of ~ 1ha.

=== Jainism temple ===
A renowned Jain Acharya Yashobhadra Suriji (आचीर्य श्री यशोभद्र सूरिजी) established the Jain temple dedicated to Tirthankar Pasharvanath in VS 1029 (972 CE) during the reign of Rawal Narvahan Singh. Thereafter, during the reign of Rawal Jaitra Singh (VS1270-1309) Acharya Jagchandra Suriji stayed at Ayad. He debated with and defeated the religious pundits. As a recognition of his feats, he was conferred the title of "Tap-Hirla" (तप हिरला के विरूद अलंकृत वैशाख शुक्ल 3, VS 1285). Consequently, he got constructed four large temples of Supasharvanath श्री सुपाश्र्वनाथ, Sankheshwar -Pasharvanath श्री शंखेश्वर पाश्र्वनाथ, Adinath श्री आदिनाथ, and Shantinath श्री शान्तिनाथ in an area of ~2700 sq m which have now been restored to their past glory. This information is based on a manuscript which was written by Mewar ruler's Mantri (Minister) Shravak Hemchand Shershthi –रावल के मंत्री श्रावक हैमचन्द श्रेष्ठी-that are preserved at Shantinath Gyan Bhandaar, Khambat (Cambay, Gujarat). Rawal Vair (i) Singh constructed the ramparts of Ayad (1103CE). On the northern bank of Ayad River and south of Ayad dwellings is located the cremation ground for the Ayad dwellers. The same ground in the nearby area must have been used for the Royal Rawal family members too. Thus Ayad town had all the components of a well organized dwelling center of long standing with multi-cultural setting. As were the Sisoda (सीसोदा) dwelling Guhilot came to be known as Sisodia (सिसोदिया), likewise, the Ayad (Ahaad आहाड़) dwelling Guhilot came to be known as "Ahadaa" (आहाड़ा), Rawal Samant Singh (1197 CE) who moved to Dungarpur and its later branch Banswara (1527) are known as Ahadaa Guhilot.

=== Western Girwa Valley ===
The western part of Girwa Valley was also possibly sparsely inhabited, which is evident from the discovery of a shila-lekh (rock inscription) near Hasti Mata Temple. It describe the times of Rawal Shakti Kumar (977CE). Likewise, there is a shila-lekh of Rawal Allat (953CE) at the Shaandeshwar Temple near the present-day Ashoknagar cremation ground (shmashāna or smashaan).

With this background information and the tragic memory of the Second Saka & Jauhar (1535) and Sher Shah Suri's campaign (1544), fresh in his mind, Maharana Udai Singh was firmly of the view that under the changed artillery warfare of his time, it is wise to "get back to the hills". He had realized the advantages of the hilly areas when he was residing in exile at Kumbhalgarh. His guardian "Kileydaar" (Fort In-Charge) Asha Shah Devpura and foster-mother Panna Dhai must have told him of the terrain advantages utilized by Rana Hameer and the family of adjoining village Sisoda. When Maharana Udai Singh was faced with the emergence of Mughal rule in the north, he rightly realized that sooner than later the situations like the ones of the siege of Bahadur Shah or the campaign of Sher Shah Suri may arise.

=== Shifting the capital ===
So he decided to shift the capital from venerable but vulnerable Chittaurgarh back to secure Girwa Valley. He rightly chose, as suggested by the hermit Goswami Premgiriji, to locate his palace on the ~N-S trending ridge east of the Pichola Lake which was sloping in NE direction. From there it provided a more commanding view of the valley. Besides, it had adequate water resources for the proposed capital last but the area was not flood-prone as was the Ayad town. This location ~5 km west of Ayad town also had a high hill -Machala Magra- with strategic view which could be used for newly-emerging artillery defense of his new capital. As per the Chittaud-Udaipur Patnama of Badwa Dalichand, a fortress named Udaigadh as constructed atop this strategic hill in which a crocodile-faced cannon – Udaibaan was also set up. Taking all these aspects into consideration Maharana Udai Singh founded the city on the auspicious Aakhaa-Teej day of 1553 CE (in Kriti Nakshatra, Akshay Tritiya, Vaishaakh Sudi Teej, VS 1609, Saturday- 15 April 1553), this has been approved by the high level official committee The city of Udaipur is protected by a double defense system.

The Girwa Valley surrounded by hills form the natural defense. The city is further protected by 3 gates and fortified walls towards the East, the North, and the South along the established trade routes. The outer entry gate and defense wall at the eastern flat area entry to the new city was constructed at the 15-km end of Girwa Valley at Debari (Dev-Bari/Debari-ka-Darwaza) on Sunday the Ashaadh Vidhi Teej of VS 1610 (20 May 1554).

Proactive role of the Maharanees in the construction of the new capital is manifested by the facts:

- In 1555 the Patvi (eldest) Maharani Songariji constructed a step-well and Sarai (tavern/rest-house for travelers) at Debari Gate;
- Maharani Sajjadevi (Suja Kunwar/Sajjabaiji d/o Rao Prithviraj Solanki of Toda) built the Prahaladrai Temple on the bank of Udaisagar.

Maharana Udai Singh also constructed a major masonry dam to the east of the capital city which was also named after him as Udaisagar. Its work started on Aakhaa-Teej of 1559 CE and the construction was completed in 6 years. The dam was commissioned on 4 April 1565. Its religious ceremony was performed by Bhatt Cheethuji, who was granted the village Bhoorwada for this work. After festivity and "Tula-Daan", the Maharana along with his Maharanees performed "parikrama" (going around the lake) in palkees (palanquins). The lake provided additional water resource, essentially for irrigation, but more importantly it effectively blocked the ONLY flat ground/pass/gap leading "into" the Girwa Valley (rest of the entry points into Girwa Valley were through hill passes).

=== Construction of dam ===
Because Dewda Rajput families owned agriculture land that would be submerged in Udaisagar, they opposed the construction of this dam. But Maharana Udai Singh tackled the situation tactfully but firmly to see this strategic project through. He granted Dewdas the status of protectors of Udaipur (somewhat similar to the Harawal status of Chundawats). Not only that, the Maharana rehabilitated them down-stream and bestowed them with first rights to canal irrigation for their new equivalent land grants.

=== New city ===
The Maharana encouraged people of all castes & communities to settle in the new city for which he liberally granted lands. Numerous tamra-patra (copper-plates) corroborate the bestowal of grants. The nobles and traders also settled here with the construction of their havelees, while the public constructed modest houses. Quite a few step wells were constructed as also the bathing ghats on Pichola's shoreline. Maharana Udai Singh ensured that the original dhunee (fire-pit) of the Hermit is preserved and decreed that all the subsequent coronations of Maharana are to be held at this place. The sacred place was named "Rai-Angan". The Dhunee is preserved to date with due sanctity. With the shift of seat of power from Chittaurgarh to Udaipur, the two main nobles-direct descendants of Chundaji and that of Prithviraj Chauhan too moved closer to Udaipur.

The descendants of Chundaji shifted from Begu to Salumber and Rao Purbiya Balbhadra Singh (Chauhan, 1558-1583) shifted from Gungrar to Bedla respectively. A cannon was fired at chosen auspicious muhoorth (Kriti Nakshatra, Akshay Tritiya, Vaishaakh Sudi Teej, VS 1609, Saturday- 15 April 1553) at which Maharana Udai Singh laid the foundation stone for the new palace on the Rana-Magri on the eastern bank of Pichola, so did many of the citizens who were also constructing their house/havelee. It is recorded that Chauhan Balbhadra Singh also laid the foundation stone of the Bedla's "Gadh" (गढ़ small palace, ~5 km north of Udaipur) at the same auspicious moment on hearing the sound of the cannon!

=== Cremation ground ===
A cremation ground for the public was developed for the new city on the southern bank of Ayad River at the present-day Ashoknagar Shmshaan-Ghat. A large step-well is enclosed within high walls besides the already existing Shaandeshwar Shiv. The original Pichola Lake, a lake typically seen even now in villages, behind an earthen dam, was built by nomadic baldiya/banjara traders, across the gap between the southern end of Rana Magri on which Palaces were to come up after ~200 years and the northern end of ridge on which Deendayal Park has now come up. It is believed that a wealthy and resource-rich Chittar banjara (छीतर बंजारा) constructed it in 1362 CE, possibly during a sojourn at this relaxation-inducing scenic Girwa Valley while returning to Gujarat from a business trip from the north. He utilized the services of his hundreds of small-built bullocks that carried merchandise on their backs to-&-from north India and Gujarat coasts. Pichola's ‘Badi Paal’-the masonry dam-was "upgraded" later on by Maharanas Karan Singh (1620-1628), Sangram Singh-II (1710-1734), Bhim Singh (1778-1828) and Jawan Singh (1828-1838) to provide stability as well as more water to the fast-growing city following the Mewar-Mughal treaty. Maharana Jagat Singh-I (1628-1652) further added more rooms to the Raaj-Mahal and further developed Jagmandir island palace and temples in the city. Over the centuries, four more water bodies were added to Pichola to its north, viz.-Amar Kund + Rang Sagar + Kumbhariya Talab + Swaroop Sagar (Kalaliya Shiv-Sagar). These additions resulted in diversion of Pichola's overflow from east to north through Swaroopsagar using Gumaniyawala that met Ayad River to east of present-day Zonal Railway Training Institute, near Panchavati.

Fruitless attacks on Udaipur by Mughal Emperors Akbar (1576) and later on by Aurangzeb (1680) proved the location (terrain) advantage of this capital city which was defended by natural features rather than the man-made battlement! In event of attacks, the public used to move westward into the hills. Gogunda and adjoining areas provided protection from invading enemies who could not move their cavalry & artillery in such a terrain. Nor could the enemy locate and eliminate the defenders. The city-wall and moat of Udaipur were added much later–detail at the section on Udaipur's Noteworthy Aspects: The double defense system of Udaipur. The artillery fortification of Ekling-Gadh on Machala Magra was effectively used for the defense of the city during the raid of Madhav Rao Scindia in 1769. The water in the moat (khai) used to be filled with the seepage water (jharan) from the lakes to its west.

=== Khargosh/hare and founding of capital cities ===
Robert Sewell in his 1983-page Domingos Paes Memoir-based Volume "A Forgotten Empire (Vijaynagar): a contribution to the History of India" mentions that when Krishna Devaraya (1336 CE) "…went out along the Tungabhadra River saw a hare, instead of fleeing from his hunting dogs, flew at them and bit them (p108)…" Sage Madhavacharya Vidyaranya (forest of learning) advised the chief to found a city on the spot which he did and named it "Vijaynagar". Likewise, Sultan Ahmed Shah of Gujarat founded the city of Ahmedabad on the banks of Sabarmati River in 1411CE when he saw a hare standing up to an attacking hunting dog-a land where a timid hare can boldly face a ferocious dog was surely a suitable site for a Capital and founded his new capital! Similarly, in the year 1425 CE Rao Sahasramal founded the capital town of Sirohi when during the Akshay Tritiya hunting excursion he saw a hare standing on his hind legs on a high (granite) boulder boldly fending off attacks of a falcon. In the same way Maharana Udai Singh too is said to have founded his new capital city of Udaipur when he hunted a hare at Akshay Tritiya hunt in 1553 CE in the Girwa Valley, a little northwest of Ayad town.

== See also ==
- Udaipur
- Udaipur State
