= Mahakaleshwar Temple Udaipur =

Hindu Temple

Religion
- Affiliation: Hinduism
- District: Udaipur
- Deity: Shiva

Location
- Location: Rani Road, Malatalia Road, Udaipur, Rajasthan, India
- State: Rajasthan
- Country: India

Mahakaleshwar Temple is one of the famous temples in Udaipur. The temple is dedicated to Lord Shiva ( as known as Mahakaal) and its 900 year old temple. According to saints Lord Shiva devotee Guru Gorakhnath worshipped at this religious site. The main shrine of the temple has Shivlinga in beautiful black stone. Prayers are done daily at the temple. The temple is good place to find peace and there is big garden as well. You can see the beautiful Fateh Sagar Lake from the temple.

== Location ==
The temple is located at the entrance of Rani Road, Malatalia Road. The temple covers an area of around 3.5 acres. The temple over looks Fateh Sagar Lake.

== Darshan times ==
- Four o'clock in the morning.
- Mangala, midday.
- Evening and night.

== Mahashivratri fest ==
Mahashivratri festival is celebrated at the temples in very grand way on every mahashivratri.
