= Fateh Sagar Lake =

Lake in Udaipur, Rajasthan, India

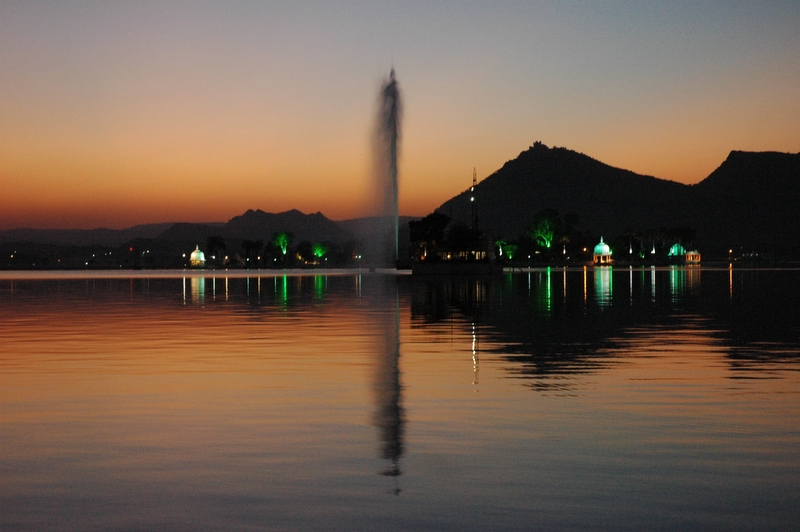
- View of Fatehsagar lake during twilight

- Location within Rajasthan
- Interactive map of Fateh Sagar Lake
- Location: Udaipur, Rajasthan
- Coordinates: 24.6°N 73.67°E
- Type: reservoir, fresh water, polymictic
- Catchment area: 54 km^{2} (21 sq mi)
- Basin countries: India
- Managing agency: Arvind Singh Mewar (Owner)
- Max. length: 2.4 km (1.5 mi)
- Max. width: 1.6 km (0.99 mi)
- Surface area: 4 km^{2} (1.5 sq mi)
- Average depth: 5.4 m (18 ft)
- Max. depth: 13.4 m (44 ft)
- Water volume: 2.1×10^{6} m^{3} (74×10^{6} cu ft)
- Shore length^{1}: 8.5 km (5.3 mi)
- Surface elevation: 578 m (1,896 ft)
- Islands: 3 (Nehru Park, Udaipur Observatory)
- Settlements: Udaipur
- ^{1} Shore length is not a well-defined measure.

Fateh Sagar Lake is situated in the city of Udaipur in the Indian state of Rajasthan. It is an artificial lake named after Maharana Fateh Singh of Udaipur and Mewar, constructed north-west of Udaipur, to the north of Lake Pichola in the 1680s.

It is one of the four lakes of Udaipur city; the other three being: the Lake Pichola (within the Udaipur town), Udai Sagar Lake, 13 kilometres (8.1 mi) to the east of Udaipur, and Dhebar Lake or Jaisamand Lake, 52 km (32 mi) south-east of Udaipur.

Within the confines of Fatah Sagar Lake, there are three small islands; the largest of these is the Nehru Park (4 km^{2} (1.5 sq mi) area), which is a popular tourist attraction, the second island (0.06 km^{2} or 15 acres area) houses a public park with an impressive water-jet fountain, and the third island (1.2 km^{2} area) hosts the Udaipur Solar Observatory (USO). The Nehru park is accessible by inboard motor boats. The blue waters of the lake and the backdrop of the green mountains has given the soubriquet "the second Kashmir" to Udaipur .

Udaipur Lake Conservation Society's reports indicate that the lake supports and sustains ground water recharge, drinking water, agricultural use, industrial use, ecological water availability and provides employment to 60% population of Udaipur.

== History ==
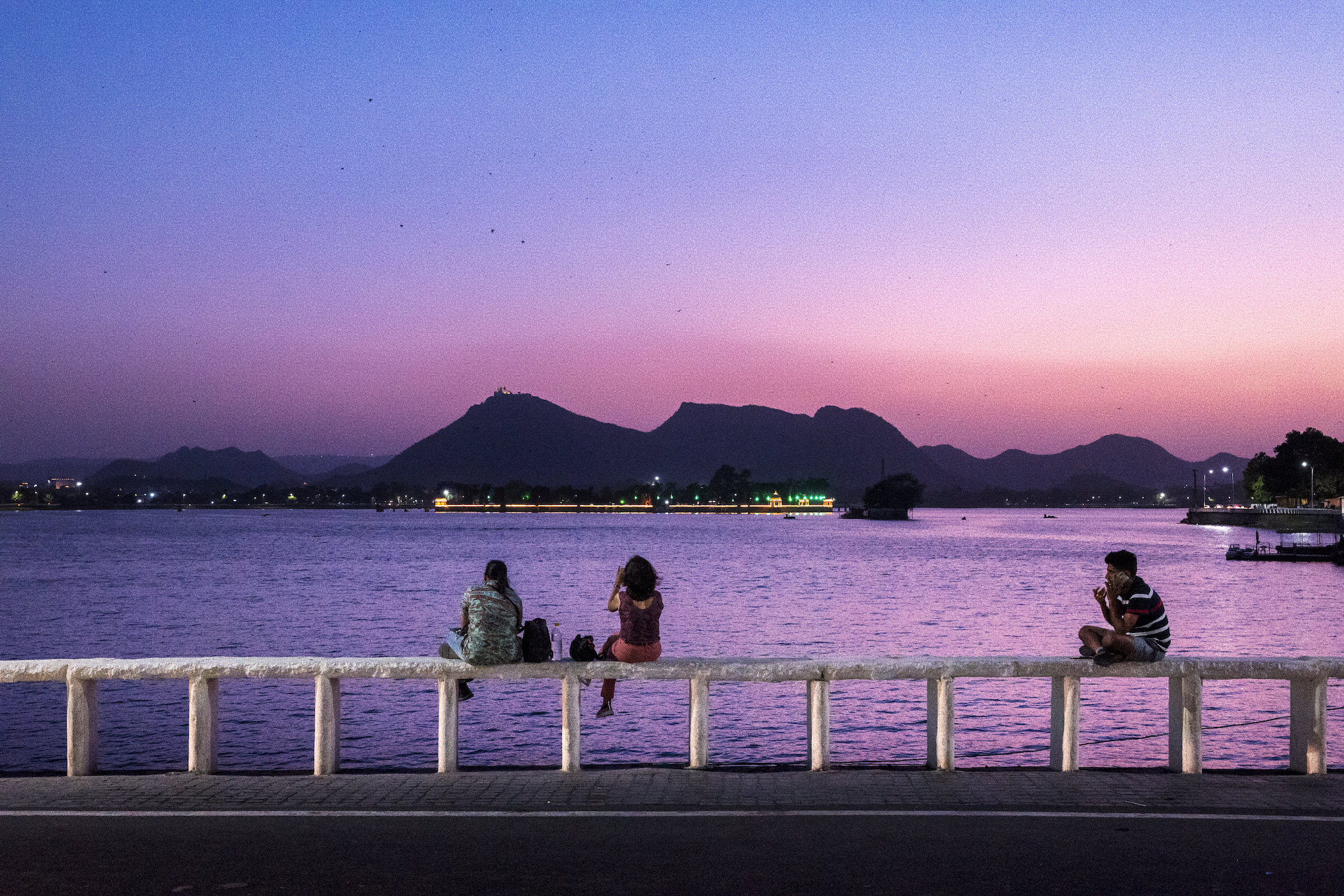
Sunset over Fateh Sagar Lake.

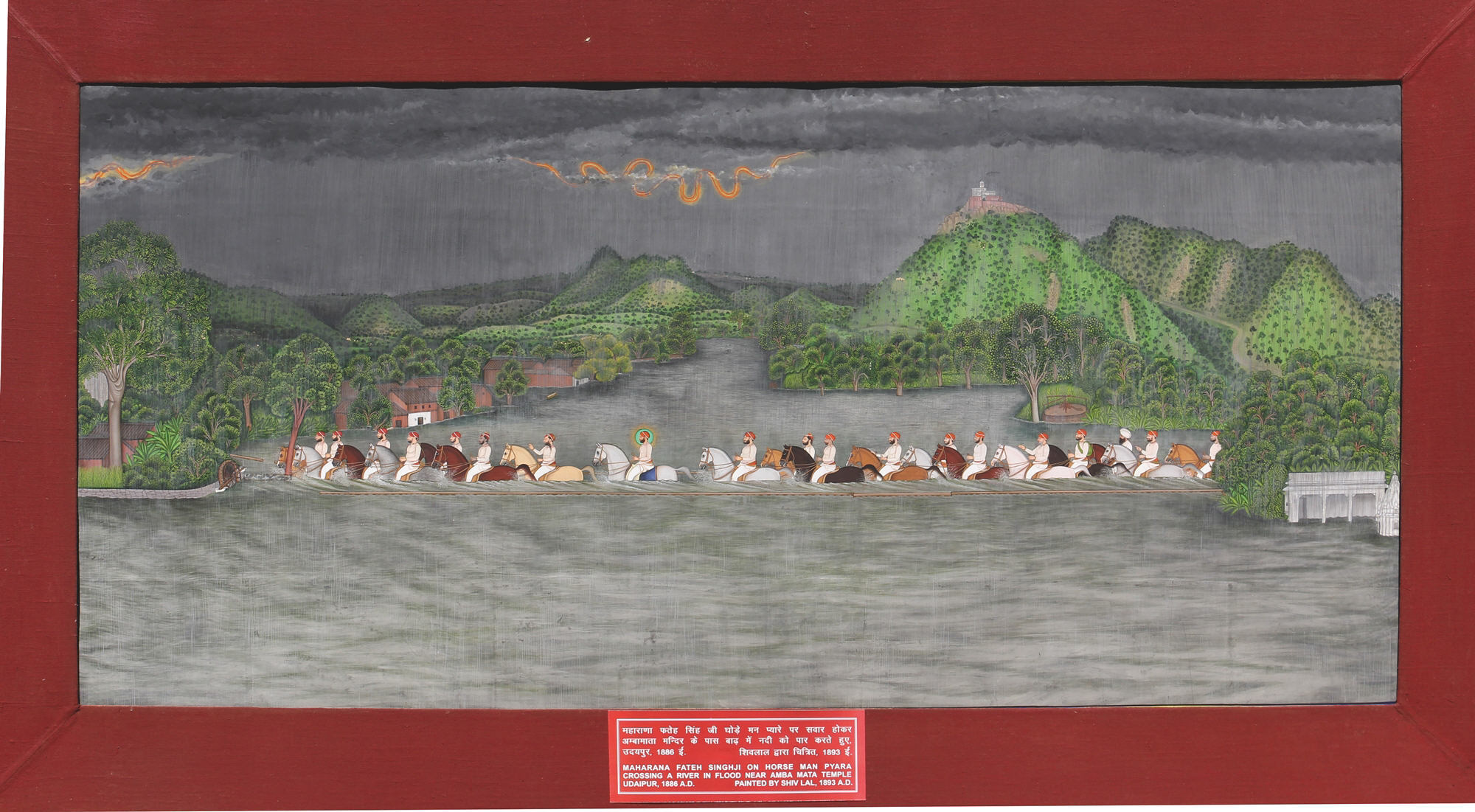
Maharana Fateh Singh's hunting party in Udaipur

In 1678, Maharana Jai Singh first constructed the lake but two hundred years later the earthen bund which formed the lake was washed away during floods, and thereafter Maharana Fateh Singh, in 1889, built the "Connaught Dam" on Lake Dewali to mark the visit of Duke of Connaught, son of Queen Victoria. The dam enlarged the lake, and it was later renamed Fateh Sagar Lake.

== Hydrology and structures ==
The runoff emerging from surrounding hills drains into this lake. The lake is pear-shaped and is encircled by the Aravalli hills on three sides with a straight gravity stone masonry dam on the eastern side which has a spillway to discharge flood flows during the monsoon season.

Three causeways, one from Pichola Lake, the other from Madar Lake and the third one from Badi Lake lead to the Fateh Sagar Lake. There are three inlet channels, which feed the lake and an overflow section on the eastern side in the masonry dam of 800 metres (2,600 ft) length. Monsoon rains are the main source of all water to the lake. Initially constructed as an irrigation scheme, it is now the second major source of drinking water to the city of Udaipur and the irrigation supplies have been discontinued. A canal from the Rang Sagar Lake connects to the Fateh Sagar Lake. A gate controlled canal further connects Fateh Sagar Lake with Lake Pichhola. The Northeastern embankment is known by three names viz., the Pal, the Drive, or Connaught Bund (bund means embankment).

During drought conditions, when the rainfall is meager, water storage in the lake is insufficient to meet the needs. To prevent loss of water due to evaporation, cetyl alcohol (hexadecanol) is sprayed over the lake surface.

== Water quality issues ==
Some of the water quality parameters reported relate to:

- pH value, which varies from a maximum of 8.4 on the surface to a minimum of 7.8 at the bottom and with minimum value of 7.9 at 5 m (16 ft) depth
- DO [mg/L] value varies from a maximum of 9.4 on the surface and minimum of 1.2 at the bottom, at 5 m depth the lowest value being 3.3.
- Maximum Nitrogen Concentration (NO3-N [mg/L] ) of 0.941 at 1 m below the surface and 0.523 at the bottom of the lake have been reported.
- The lake water is reported to be polymictic, and there is lack of true thermocline. Gradient is recorded to be poor, which results in frequent mixing, as experienced in many tropical lakes.
- The lake water temperature varies from a minimum of 19 °C (66 °F) in January to 29.4 °C (84.9 °F) in June at the surface, and correspondingly 16.8 and 28.5 °C (62.2 and 83.3 °F) at the bottom of the lake.

Eutrophication has occurred in the lake due to algal bloom; the dominant species causing this are algae: Microcystis sp and submerged macrophytes. Urbanisation around the lake has also degraded water quality, which is a risk to public health of the people who are dependent on the lake for their water supply requirements. Siltation has caused reduction of storage capacity. Increase in nutrient level is also taking place on account of leaching from agricultural activity in the marginal agricultural lands around the lake periphery. These are some of the reasons attributed for lake degradation. The Udaipur city, set around the lakes, with its numerous hotels catering to the large influx of tourists and a large number of residential complexes on the slopes of the lake, also add pollutants to the lake.

== Flora ==
Within the lake water, the flora recorded consists of the following.

Macrophytes that have merged in the lake, floating macrophytes, the submerged macrophytes and the Phytoplankton.

The Biomass production due to macrophytes is reported to be a maximum of 864.9 grams per square metre [g/m^{2}] (0.1771 lb/sq ft) on the surface of the lake, with a minimum of 329 g/m^{2} at the bottom. The biomass recorded due to plankton is reported to be at maximum during January, as 67 milligrams per litre [mg/L] (2.4×10^{−6} lb/cu in) at the surface and 23 g/L at the bottom of the lake. It is a low of 16 g/L at the surface and 1 at the bottom during July, during the rainy season.

The lake's surroundings have sparse vegetation cover; however, several species of plants are found along the roads and the hills in the lake basin.

== Fauna ==
The fauna recorded in the lake are the Zooplankton, Benthos and Fish. The economically important fishes reported are:

C. punctatus, C. reba, Catla catla, L. calbasu, Channa marulius, Cirrhina mrigala, L. gonius, Labeo rohita, Tor khudree, and Wallago attu.

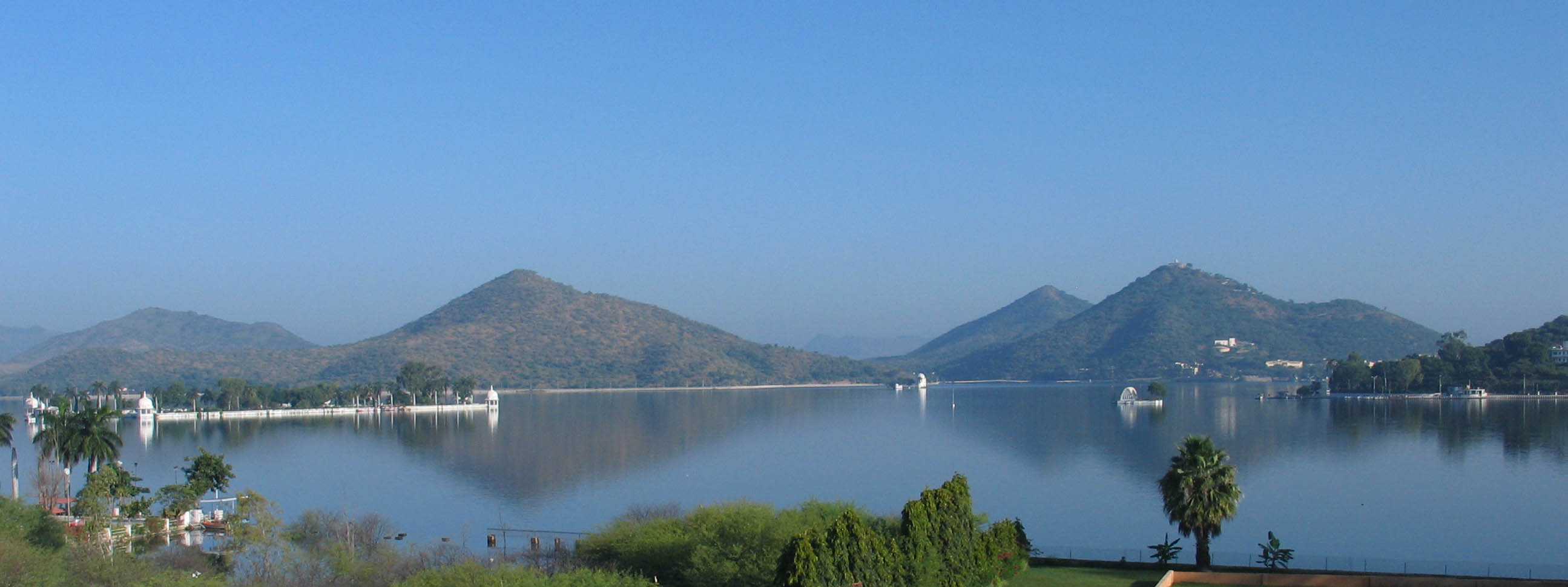
A panoramic view of Fateh Sagar Lake

== Lake restoration works ==
The first effort to desilt the lake and improve its water quantity was undertaken by local citizen groups and environmental conservation organizations. The shallow part of the lake was desilted through voluntary labour in the early 1970s. Udaipur Lake Conservation Society, a Non Governmental Organisation (NGO) set up in 1992, has independently carried out studies of the problems of the lakes of Udaipur and has been continuously pressurising the government agencies to take up several restoration schemes on the lakes of Udaipur, including Fatah Sagar Lake, some of which are reported to have been acted upon by the Rajasthan Government. The restoration works pursued are Limnological Conservation Works (introducing new varieties of fish species), Ecological Conservation Works (catchment area treatment), Hyacinth removal (through bio-control), lining of unlined canal from Moti Magri Hill to Fatah Sagar Lake, construction of sewage lines, institutional development in the form of creating Special Purpose Vehicle (SPV) for the lakes, etc. It has appealed in the Rajasthan High Court, through Public Interest Litigations, seeking court's intervention on several issues concerning restoration of small lakes, land acquisition up to the High Flood Level (HFL) of the Lakes, Constitution of the Lake Development Authority (LDA) for Udaipur Lakes, etc. which are reported to have been upheld by the High Court

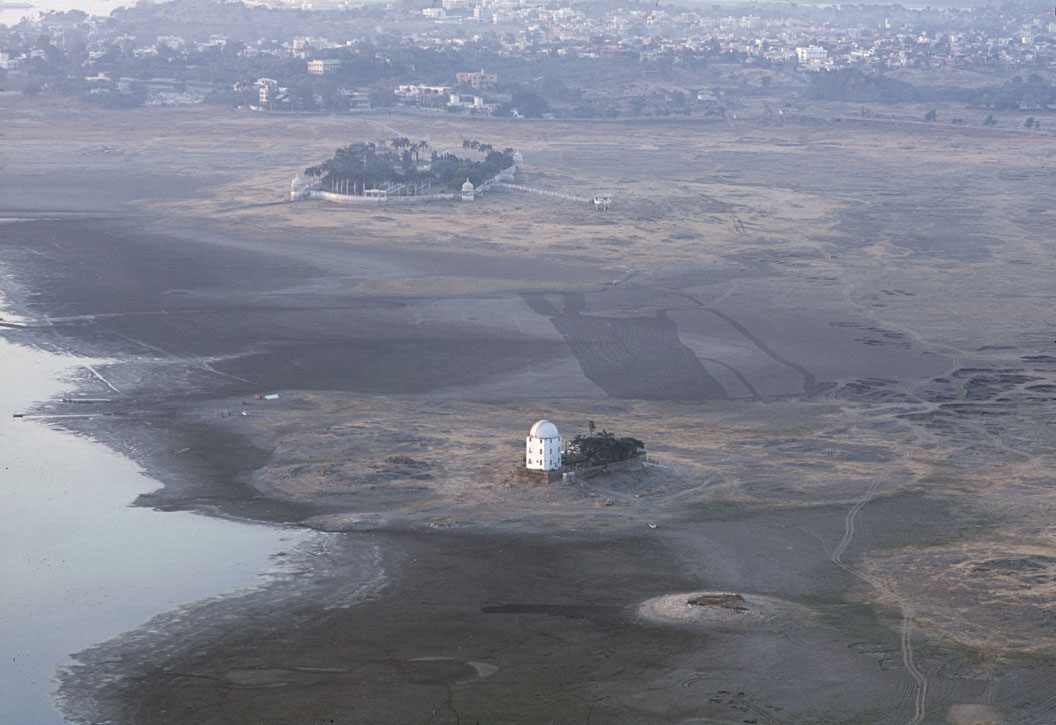
Udaipur Observatory in Fatah Sagar Lake, when it is in a dry condition

Government of India, under its National Lake Conservation Plan (NLCP) of the Ministry of Environment & Forests (MoE&F), has sanctioned in June 2008, projects for development of Fatah Sagar Lake in Udaipur at a cost of about US$10 million (Rs 42 crore) with central government sharing 70% of the costs and the balance 30% by the State government. This programme of NLCP envisages desilting of the lake area, installation of a sewage treatment plant, beautification of the adjacent area and installation of fountains, with a completion schedule of 18 months.

== Access ==
A winding road with a peripheral protection stone wall on the lake side exists on the eastern shore of the lake. The entire circumference of the lake could be covered by road via Moti Magri Road, Fatah Sagar Drive, Rani Road and the winding road on the eastern side route to get a picturesque view of the lake, and the Aravali Hills surrounding it. Tongas (horse driven two wheelers), auto-rickshaws and taxis can be hired to reach the lake as well.

== Festival ==
Every year a festival called the Hariyali Amavasya Mela (Green New Moon Fair) is organised at the lake precincts, in the month of Shravan (August/September).

== Aquarium ==
'Under The Sun' Aquarium in Udaipur.

Fateh Sagar also houses an aquarium known as 'Under The Sun'. This aquarium, built under the Fatehsagar Paal, showcases over 200 species of fishes brought from 16 countries across the world. It was inaugurated on 21 October 2017.

== Mahakaleshwar Temple Udaipur ==
The Mahakaleshwar Temple, one of the most famous temples in Udaipur, sits on the banks of the Fateh Sagar Lake. The temple is dedicated to Lord Shiva, and according to many devotees Guru Gorakhnath worshipped at this site.

== Events ==
Fateh Sagar is popular destination for organising various national and international events. Recently, it was a venue for the first edition of India's first World Music Festival, a two-day festival held on 13 and 14 February. Performances were made by artists and musicians from more than 12 countries, including Spain, Ghana, Venezuela, Italy, France as well as India.

== See also ==
- List of dams and reservoirs in India
- List of lakes in India
- Udaipur
- Lake Pichola
- Swaroop Sagar Lake
- Lake Badi
- Udaisagar Lake
- City Palace
- Sajjangarh Mansoon Palace
