= Udaipur Solar Observatory =

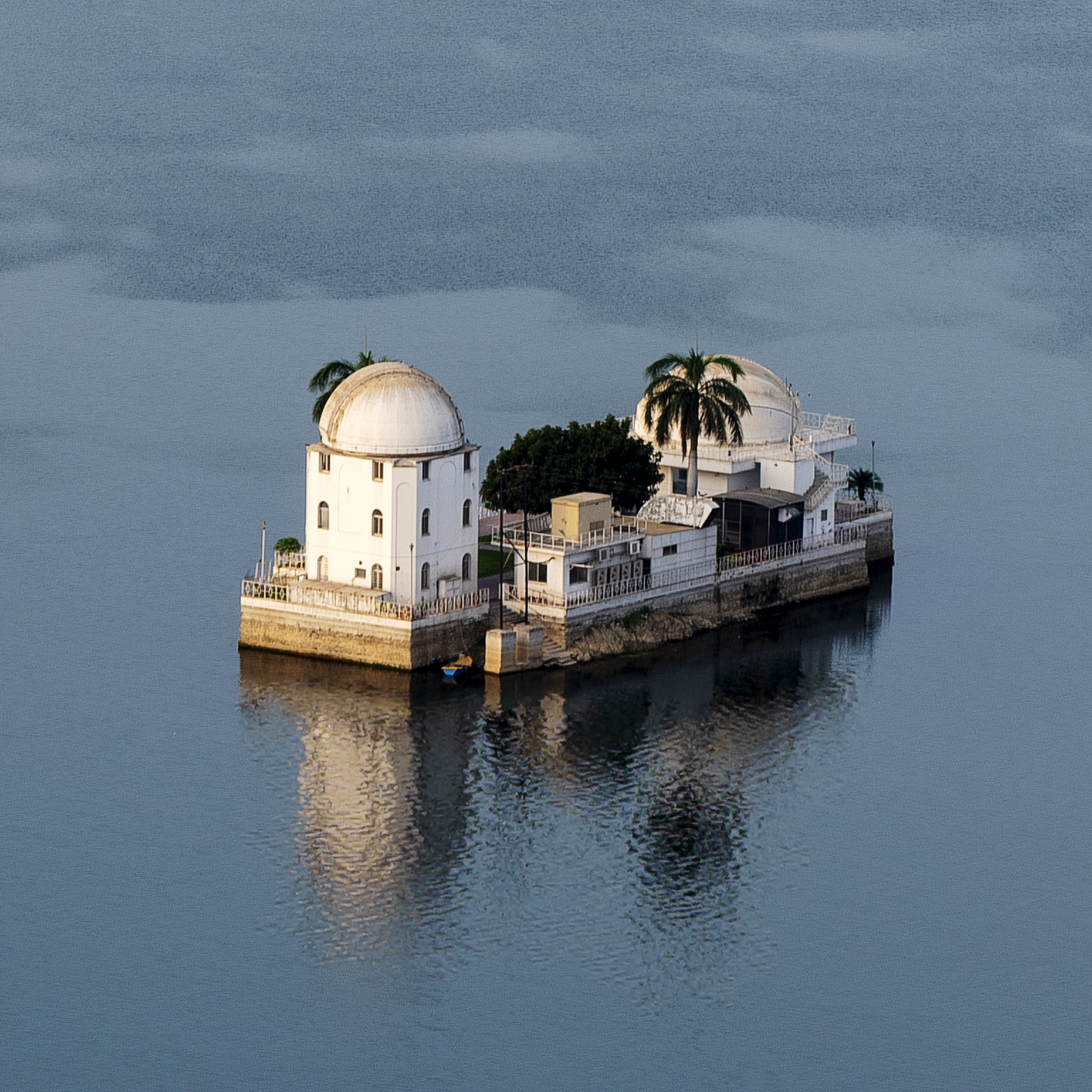
- Aerial view of the observatory in June 2022
- Location: Udaipur, Udaipur district, Udaipur division, Rajasthan, India
- Coordinates: 24°36′16.52″N 73°40′27.08″E
- Established: 1976
- Website: www.prl.res.in/~uso/

The Udaipur Solar Observatory (USO) is a solar observatory located in Udaipur, Rajasthan, India on an island in the Fateh Sagar Lake. The sky conditions at Udaipur are quite favourable for solar observations. Since the observatory is situated amidst a large mass of water, air turbulence which occurs due to ground heating by sun's rays is decreased. This improves the image quality and accuracy (average between 1-2 arc seconds).

== History ==
The observatory was built in 1976 by Dr. Arvind Bhatnagar following the model of the Solar Observatory at Big Bear lake in Southern California. Later, he was joined by Dr. Ashok Ambastha in 1983 and subsequently by many others at different stages who have continued to contribute to the growth of this observatory.

== Telescopes ==
Utilizing a variety of telescopes, USO is known for its solar observations, which include high-resolution solar chromospheric, magnetic field, velocity, and spectral observations, for studies pertaining to solar flares, mass ejections, and the evolution of solar active regions. USO fills the large longitudinal gap between Australia and Spain, and provides a link for continuous solar coverage in international collaborative programs, including the Global Oscillations Network Group (GONG). Since 1981, USO has been managed by the Physical Research Laboratory, Ahmedabad, for the Department of Space, Government of India.

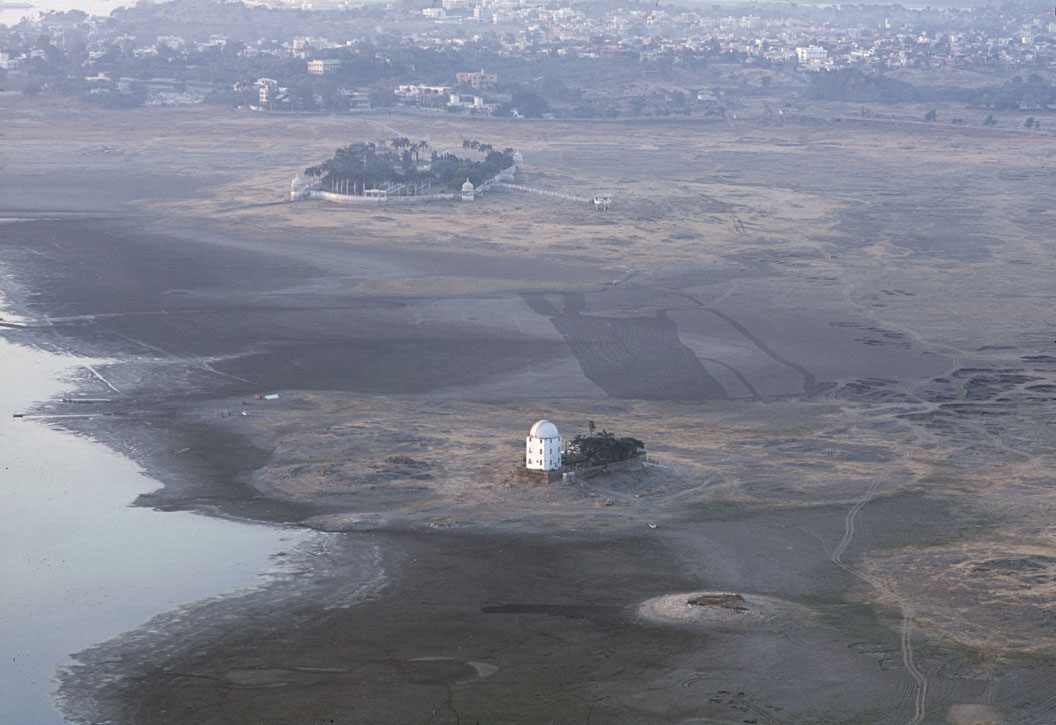
The observatory in December 2002 during a dry season

=== Multi Application Solar Telescope (MAST) ===
The Multi Application Solar Telescope (MAST) was operationalised on 4 August 2015. MAST is an off-axis Gregorian-Coude telescope with a 50 cm aperture to be used to study the Sun's magnetic field.

== See also ==
- List of solar telescopes
