= Udaypur Wildlife Sanctuary =

Wildlife sanctuary in India

- IUCN category IV (habitat/species management area)
- Location within Bihar Location within India
- Interactive map of Udaypur Wildlife Sanctuary
- Location: West Champaran district, Bihar, India
- Nearest city: Bettiah
- Coordinates: 26.815789°N 84.4324626°E
- Area: 8.74& km^{2}

Udaypur Wildlife Sanctuary (also spelled Udaipur), containing Udaypur Lake (also spelled Udaipur Lake, not to be confused with Udaipur City's Five lakes) which is a Ramsar site, is a wildlife sanctuary located in West Champaran district of Bihar state, India. It was established in 1978, and covers an area of 8.74 km^{2}. The wildlife sanctuary is predominantly 319 ha wetland, located on an oxbow lake in the floodplain of the Gandaki River.

== Flora ==
The sanctuary has areas of swamp forest, dry riverine forest, and khair-sissoo forest (Acacia catechu-Dalbergia sissoo). It is in the Lower Gangetic Plains moist deciduous forests ecoregion.

== Fauna ==
It is home to a variety of water birds, both resident and migratory.

== Facilities ==
The sanctuary has a rest house. The sanctuary is under the authority of the Deputy Director of the Champaran Forest Division, headquartered in Bettiah. This sanctuary is about half an hour from Bettiah wetlands.

== Transport ==
The nearest town and railhead is Bettiah.

== See also ==
- List of Ramsar sites in India
- Valmiki National Park
