= Arvind Bhatnagar =

Indian astronomer (1936–2006)

- Born: 19 November 1936; Beawar, Rajasthan
- Died: 18 May 2006 (aged 69); Jaipur, Rajasthan
- Education: Agra University
- Scientific career
- Fields: Solar Astronomy
- Workplaces: Udaipur Solar Observatory
- Doctoral advisor: Prof. M. K. Vainu Bappu

Arvind Bhatnagar (19 November 1936 – 18 May 2006) was an Indian astronomer who made significant contributions to solar astronomy and founded several planetaria across India. He was the founder-director of the Udaipur Solar Observatory, and the founder director of Nehru Planetarium of Bombay.

Prof. Arvind Bhatnagar was known internationally for his contributions to Solar Astronomy. He was the founder-director of the Udaipur Solar Observatory. He also took immense interest in popularization of astronomy and helped establishing several planetaria across India. Arvind Bhatnagar was born in Beawar, Rajasthan on 19 November 1936. After completing his MSc in Physics, he joined the UP State Observatory, Nainital, in 1958 and worked there until 1961. He obtained his PhD degree in Solar Physics in 1964 from Agra University while working at the Kodaikanal Observatory under the guidance of Prof. M K. Vainu Bappu.

He was awarded the Carnegie Fellowship to work at Mount Wilson and Palomar Observatories, USA, from 1968–1970. Afterwards, he worked as a Resident Astronomer at the Big Bear Solar Observatory of the California Institute of Technology, Pasadena, California, USA till 1972.

In 1972, Prof. Bhatnagar returned to India to establish a unique island solar observatory in the middle of Lake Fatehsagar in Udaipur under the aegis of the Vedhshala, Ahmedabad. This lake site was carefully selected by him after taking into consideration the facts that Rajasthan received the maximum sunshine and the large body of lake water helps to stabilize the air turbulence arising due to heating of ground by the solar radiation. Due to his efforts, the solar observatory was taken over by the Department of Space in December 1981 for its speedy growth, and was affiliated to the Physical Research Laboratory, Ahmedabad. The Udaipur Solar Observatory has become internationally renowned as one of the major centers for high-resolution solar observations. It is also one of the six observatories located around the world participating in the Global Oscillations Network Group (GONG) for the study of solar interior.

Another important event in Dr. Arvind Bhatnagar's Scientific tryst was on 24 October 1995, during the Total Solar Eclipse, where Dr. Arvind Bhatnagar supervised the MiG-25 aircraft flying at 80,000 feet altitude as they traveled along the path of the eclipse at 3,000 km/h, gaining several precious minutes of observation denied to researchers stuck on the ground.

This was an attempt by Indian Scientists to pin down the exact diameter of the sun, which today still remains unknown, by precisely measuring the sun's shadow cast on the earth. Three Indian Air Force planes were deployed with cameramen and scientists to examine the umbra. Separately, a pair of IAF MiG-25 fighters were fitted with equipment to photograph the outer solar corona and also the dust rings around it, in the darkest, clearest possible sky.

In 1996, Prof. Bhatnagar started a novel project called SUCHE (Swatch, Healthy, Urban, Clean and Hygienic Environment) Abhiyan in several localities of Udaipur under ASTHA Sansthan for solid waste management through public participation. He was also appointed as one of the High Court Commissioners to monitor the directives of the High Court in connection with protection of the lake system of Udaipur.

Bhatnagar died on the evening of 18 May 2006 in Udaipur.

== Publications ==
- Fundamentals of Solar Astronomy, William Livingston coauthor, World Scientific Publishing Company, Inc., 2005
