= Kailashpur =

- Census town
- Location within Uttar Pradesh Location within India
- Coordinates: 29°58′30″N 77°38′07″E
- Country: India
- State: Uttar Pradesh
- District: Saharanpur

Population (2011)
  - Total: 11,422

Urdu, Hindi
  - Official: Hindi
- Time zone: UTC+5:30 (IST)
- Vehicle registration: UP
- Website: up.gov.in

Kailashpur is a census town in Saharanpur district in the Indian state of Uttar Pradesh.

== Demographics ==
As of 2011 India census, Kailashpur had a population of 11,422. Males constitute 52.48% of the population and females 47.51%. Kailashpur has an average literacy rate of 67.96%, lower than the national average of 74.04%: male literacy is 74.04%, and female literacy is 61.24%. In Kailashpur, 15.59% of the population is under 6 years of age.
