= Rang Sagar Lake =

- Location within Rajasthan
- Interactive map of Rang Sagar Lake
- Location: Udaipur, Rajasthan
- Coordinates: 24.584°N 73.681°E
- Type: reservoir, fresh water, polymictic
- Basin countries: India
- Max. length: 0.25 km (0.16 mi)
- Settlements: Udaipur

Rang Sagar Lake is situated in the city of Udaipur in the Rajasthan state of India. It is an artificially created lake, built in 1668. It is also known as Amarkunt, that connects Swaroop Sagar Lake and Pichola Lake. It is situated Ambamata connecting to Swaroop Sagar lake.

== See also ==
- List of lakes in India
