= Jag Mandir Palace =

Palace in Udaipur, India

Jag Mandir
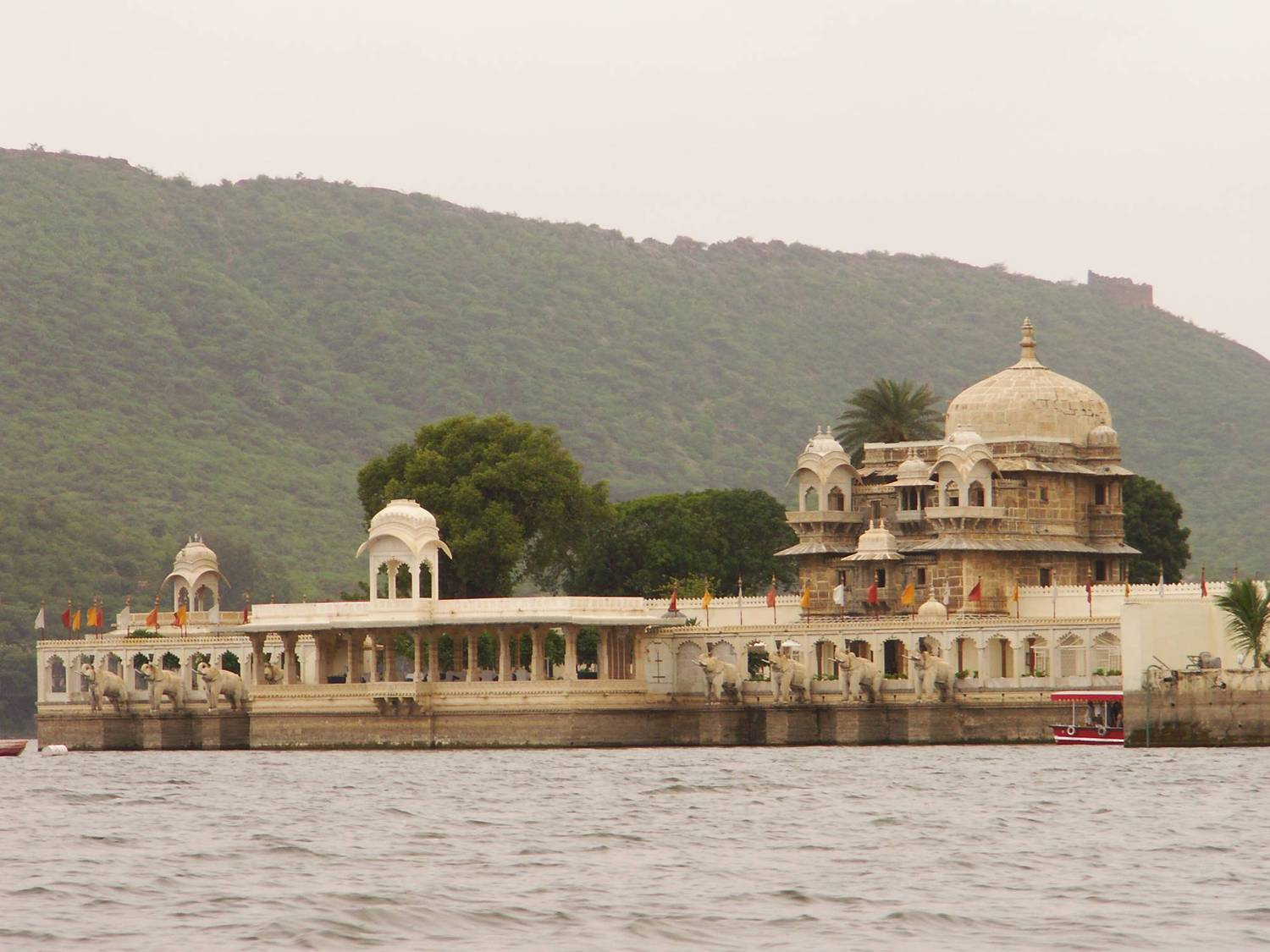
- Jag Mandir with sculpture of eight elephants adorning the entrance and facing the Lake Palace
- Interactive map of the Jag Mandir area

General information
- Architectural style: Rajput architecture
- Location: Udaipur, India
- Coordinates: 24.5672°N 73.6781°E
- Construction started: 1551
- Completed: Mid 17th century
- Client: Maharana Jagat Singh I
- Owner: Arvind Singh Mewar

Technical details
- Structural system: Yellow Sandstone and Marble

Jag Mandir is a palace built on an island in Lake Pichola. It is also called the "Lake Garden Palace". The palace is located in Udaipur city in the Indian state of Rajasthan. Its construction is credited to three Maharanas of the Sisodia Rajputs of Mewar kingdom. The construction of the palace was started in 1551 by Maharana Amar Singh and was finally completed by Maharana Jagat Singh I (1628–1652). It is named "Jagat Mandir" in honour of the last named Maharana, Jagat Singh. The royal family used the palace as a summer resort and pleasure palace for holding parties. On one occasion, the palace served as a refuge to asylum seekers. It features Mughal-style architecture. In 1623, Shah Jahan lived here when he was in revolt against his father.

== Geography ==
Jag Mandir is situated in one of the two natural islands in the Pichola lake (named after the village Picholi nearby), on its southern end. The lake was initially created in the 15th century by a local banjara tribal chieftain for carrying grain across the streams. During the reign of Maharana Udai Singh II, in 1560, the lake was substantially enlarged by constructing dams across two streams. At that time, the Maharana also built the Jag Mandir and the Lake Palace (Jag Niwas Hotel) on islands in the midst of the lake. Udaipur city with its City Palace and other monuments and temples were built on the periphery of the lake.

== History ==
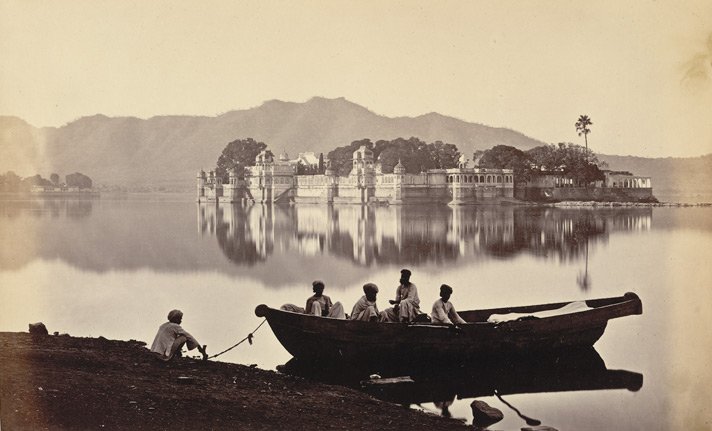
Jag Mandir Palace from above, on Lake Pichola, Udaipur. ca. 1873

The construction of the palace was started in 1616 approx by Maharana amar Singh, continued by Maharana Karan Singh (1620–1628) and finally completed by Maharana Jagat Singh I (1628–1652). It is named as "Jagat Mandir" in honour of the last named Maharana Jagat Singh. The royal family used the palace as a summer resort and pleasure palace for holding parties. The palace served as a refuge to asylum seekers for one occasion.

During the revolt in 1857, Maharana Swroop Singh (1842–1861) saved a number of European families, mostly women and children from Neemuch, which were given refuge in the Jag Mandir Palace. The revolt was popularly known as the Sepoy Mutiny, and was also called the Indian Mutiny, (or the first War of Independence) against the British Raj.

After the Independence of India from the British rule, on 15 August 1947, at the initiative of Maharana Bhupal Singh, the Mewar kingdom merged with the Indian union in 1949 along with other princely states of Rajasthan.

== Structure ==
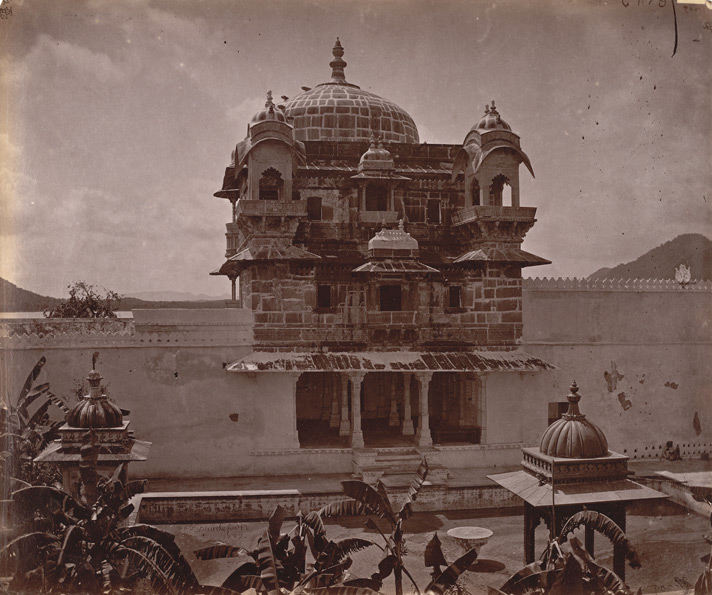
Gul Mahal, the earliest structure before renovation

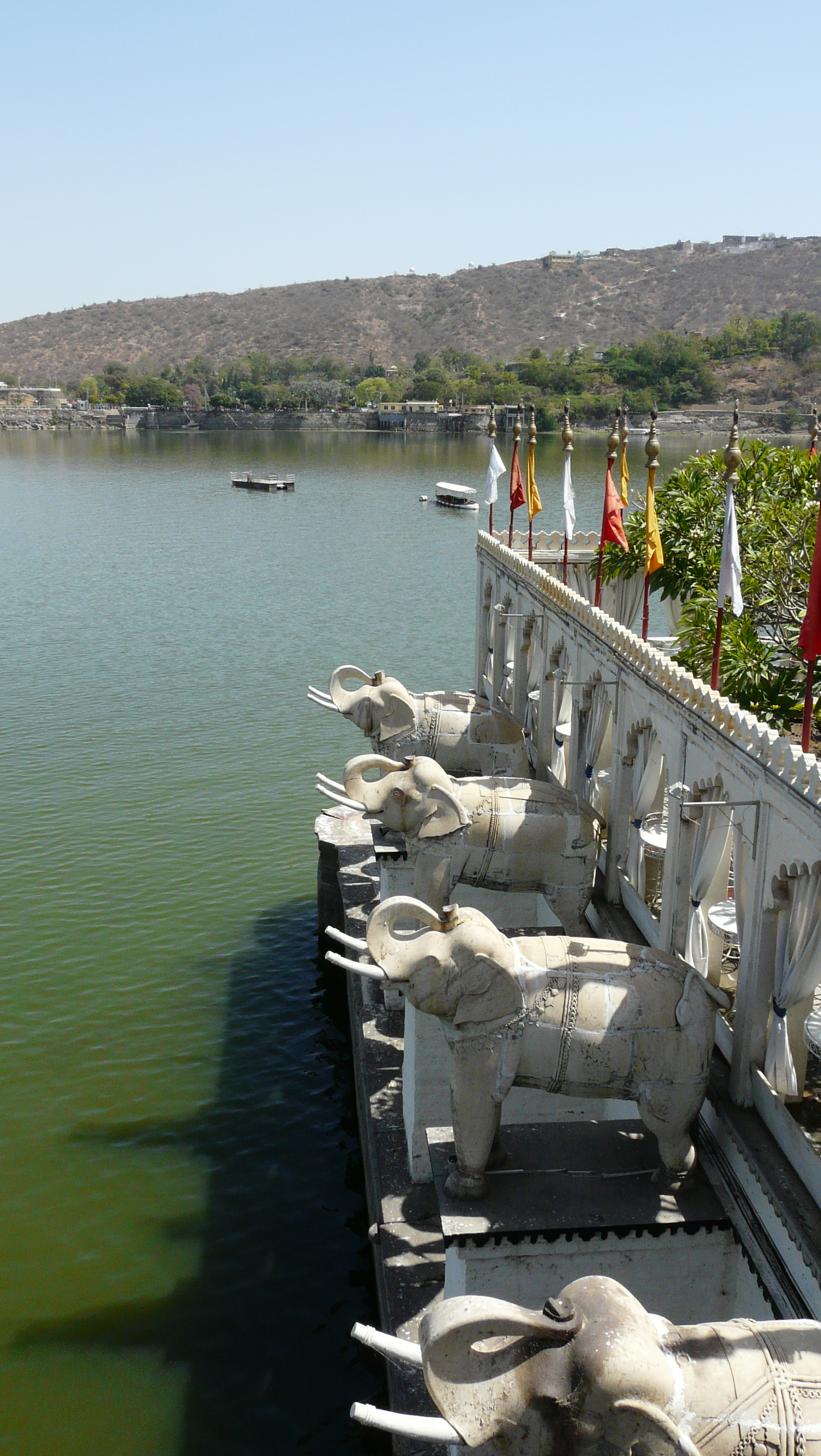
Carved statues of elephants at the jetty entry, Jag Mandir Palace.

The impressive series of structures in the three-storied Jag Mandir Palace include:

- Gul Mahal, which was built first as refuge for prince Khurram;
- the elegant facade flanked by four carved statues of elephants on either side at the jetty entry on the lake from Udaipur;
- the Garden Courtyard and the Darikhana on its northern side;
- Bara Patharon ka Mahal (palace of the 12 stones);
- the Zenana Mahal – a southern extension to the Gul Mahal;
- and the Kunwar Pada ka Mahal.

Details of these structures and of the garden are elaborated below.

Gul Mahal

Gul Mahal was the first structure built in 1551, during the reign of Maharana Amar Singh, which was further developed during the reign of Maharana Jagat Singh to house the Mughal Prince Khurram (later Emperor Shah Jahan). It was initially a small sandstone (yellow sandstone) palace with an imposing dome (which gives the appearance of a crown). The crescent of Islam is fixed on top of this dome. The Gul Mahal has three circular domed chambers, one above the other. Entry to these chambers is from a columned hall. Two marble chhatris with sloping cornices rise above the main façade. The massive marble slabs affixed to the interior walls were inlaid with coloured rubies, onyx, jasper, cornelian and jade. The palace is also said to have housed a throne carved from a single block of serpentine, which has not been traced. The Mahal is surrounded by a roomy circular apartment built in white and black marble with murals and paintings considered an uncommon feature in Rajput architecture. On the western wing of the palace, this type of design has been repeated in three other pavilions.

Jag Mandir

Jag Mandir is the main palace, which incorporates the Gul Mahal. The towers of the palace at the corners are octagonal in shape and are topped with cupolas. A labyrinth of reception halls, residential suites, and internal courts were built inside the palace, all in Rajput and Mughal architectural styles. The Zenana (residence of royal ladies chambers) adjoins the palace. The Kunwar Pada ka Mahal (the Palace of the Crown Prince) is located at the western end.

Entry pavilion

The pavilion at the entry to the palace is an impressive white colonnade of cusped arches. The landing jetty is also located for docking of boats arriving from the jetty of Bansi Ghat on the mainland near City Palace in Udaipur. The cruise is through the Pichola Lake. The pavilion is decorated with large elephants carved in stone, four on each side of the entry steps. They face the Lake Palace. The trunks of these elephants were damaged and replaced with polystyrene. The pavilion marks the perimeter of the island in the scenic backdrop of the Aravalli hills.

Garden

The flower garden in the palace complex is set up in the large Garden Courtyard. It has yew bushes, jasmine, frangipani trees, bougainvillea, palm trees, nasturtiums, verbena and moss rose. The courtyard itself is covered with black and white tiles. Fountains and water pools, crisscrossed by walkways with low marble handrails, bedeck the garden surroundings. The present Maharana hosts lavish parties here and also rents the place for private parties.

Darikhana

Darikhana is on the northern side of the palace, which is an open-sided terrace built with marble columns. This place is now run as a restaurant by the present Maharana.

Bara Patharon ka Mahal

Bara Patharon ka Mahal is located at the eastern wing of the main palace. Mahal is so named because twelve solid marble slabs have been used in its construction. Hence, it is also known as the "Palace of the Twelve Stones".

== Visitor information ==
The Jag Mandir is approached only by boat from the Bansi Ghat jetty next to the Lake Palace in Udaipur.

== In popular culture ==
The 1983 James Bond film, Octopussy featured the Jag Mandir as one of its main locations.

== Gallery ==
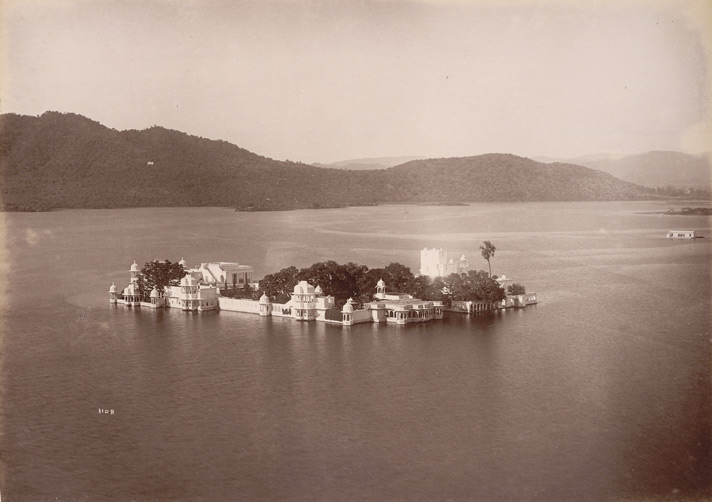
An aerial view of Jag Mandir

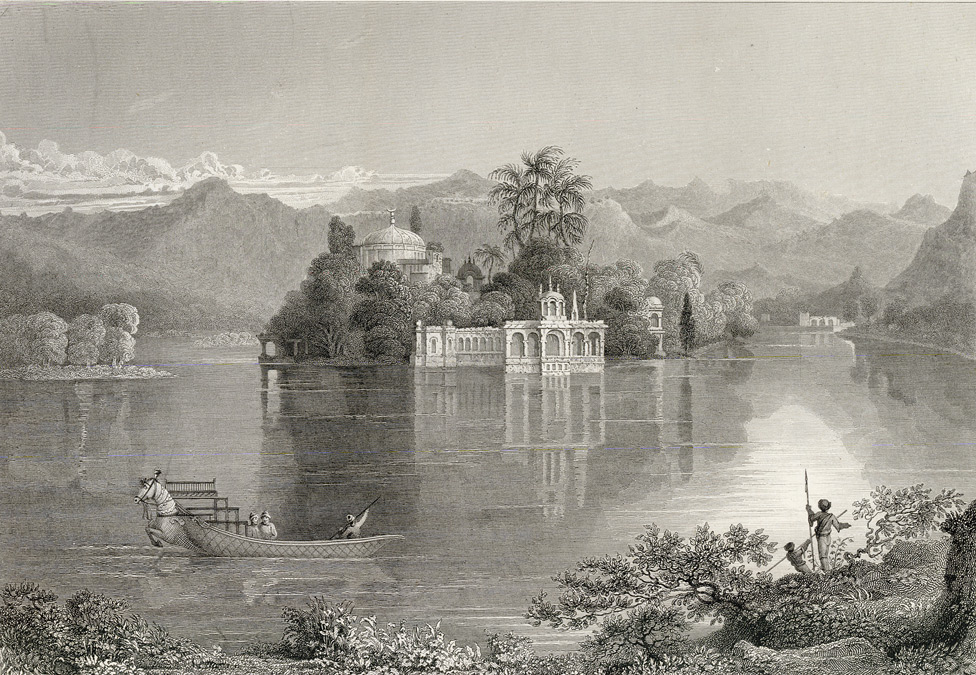
Engraving of the Jag Mandir palace, 1829

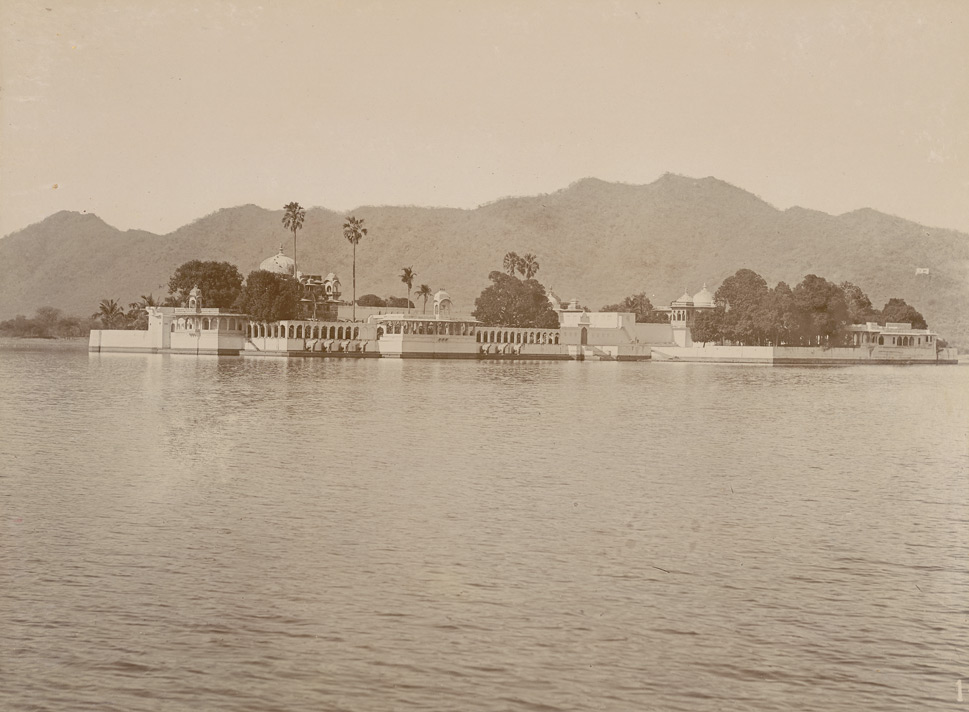
Full View of Island palace Jagmandir, 1910

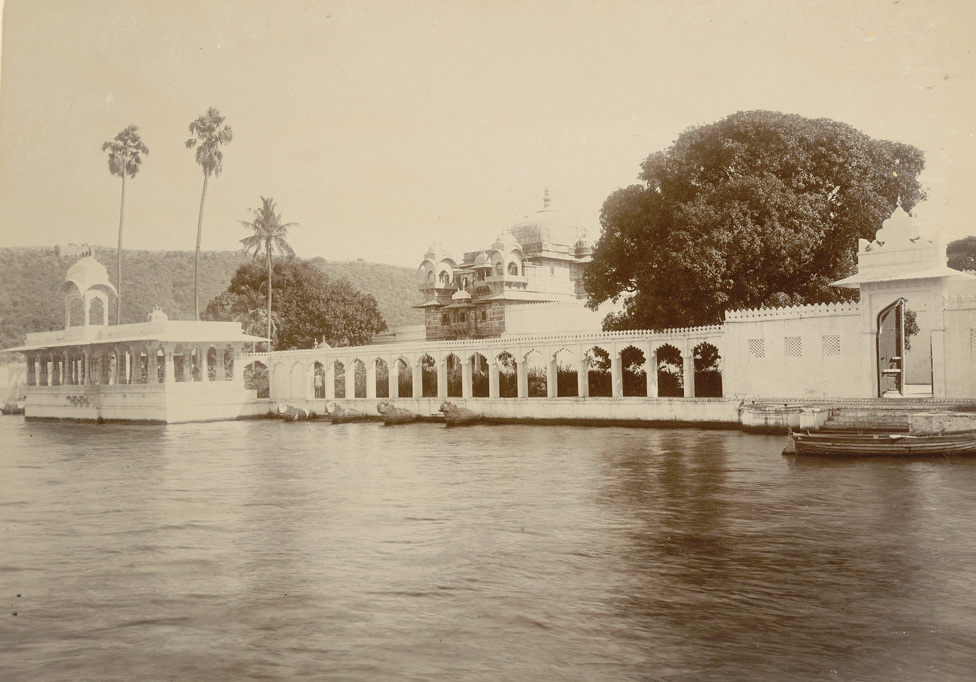
Closer view of the Jagmandir with the Gul Mahal at the back

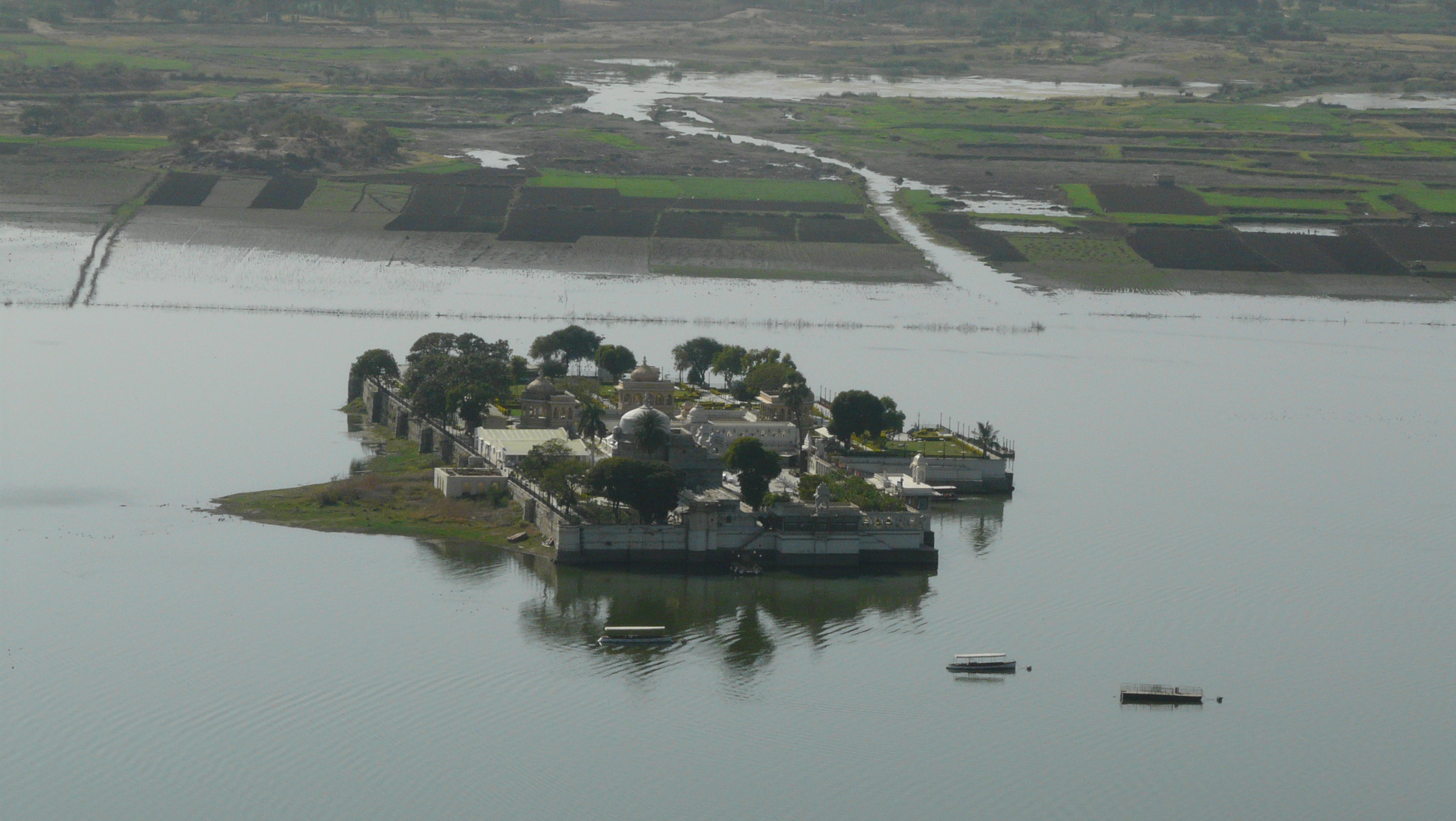
Jag Mandir Palace from above, on Lake Pichola, Udaipur.

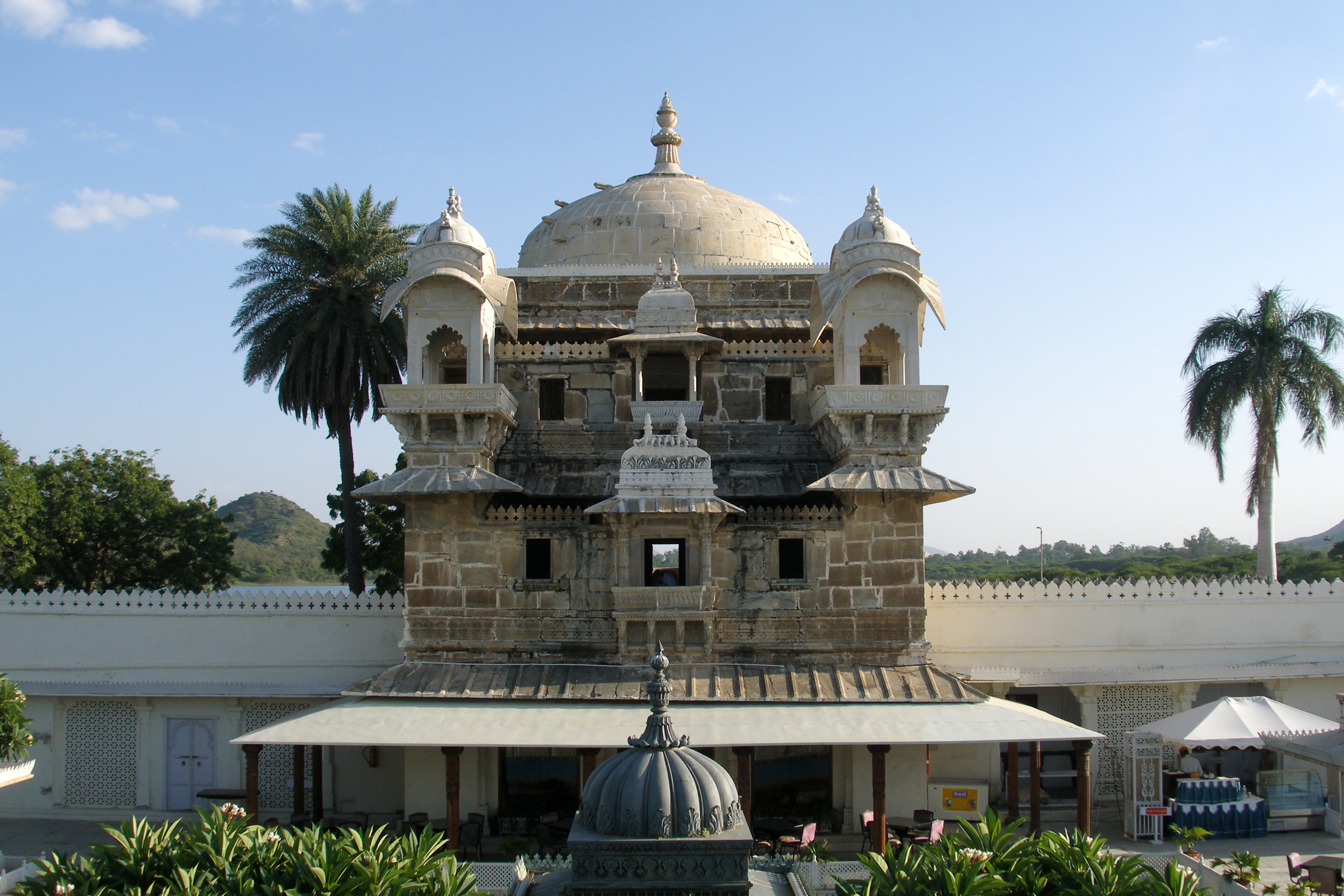
Gul Mahal, Jag Mandir Palace.

== See also ==
- Lake Palace
- Taj Mahal
- Jagdish Temple, Udaipur
