= Swaroop Sagar Lake =

- Swaroop Lake
- Location within Rajasthan
- Interactive map of Swaroop Sagar Lake
- Location: Udaipur, Rajasthan
- Coordinates: 24.585°N 73.682°E
- Type: reservoir, fresh water, polymictic
- Basin countries: India
- Max. length: 4 km (2.5 mi)
- Max. width: 2.5 km (1.6 mi)
- Surface area: 10.5 km^{2} (4.1 sq mi)
- Max. depth: 9 m (30 ft)
- Settlements: Udaipur

Swaroop Sagar Lake is situated in the city of Udaipur in the Rajasthan state of India. It is an artificially created lake, named after Maharana Swarup Singh of Udaipur. It is also known as Kumharia Talab, which is a combined water body comprising other nearby lakes Fateh Sagar Lake and Lake Pichola.

Reports from the Udaipur Lake Conservation Society suggests that lakes in Udaipur helps in ground water recharge, while providing water for drinking, agricultural use and industrial use. This generates employment for around 60 percent population of Udaipur.

== History ==
Swaroop Sagar lake was built by Maharana Swarup Singh of Udaipur during 1857s. This lake was built to avoid water congestion, and to balance the water level in the connecting lakes, namely Fateh Sagar Lake and Pichola Lake.

== Access ==
Swaroop Sagar lake is located in north-west of Udaipur, adjacent to the Fateh Sagar Lake and Lake Pichola. It is situated behind the Jagdish Temple near Chandpole connecting to Rangsagar. The Swaroop Sagar Lake is approachable by road from the Udaipur City. Visitors can take Local buses, Tongas, auto-rickshaws and taxis to reach Swaroop Sagar. The lake is a 3.5km. drive from the City Station. There is no entry ticket levied on a visit to Swaroop Sagar.

== See also ==
- List of dams and reservoirs in India
- List of lakes in India
- Udaipur
- Tourist Attractions in Udaipur
