= Lake Pichola =

Lake in Rajasthan, India

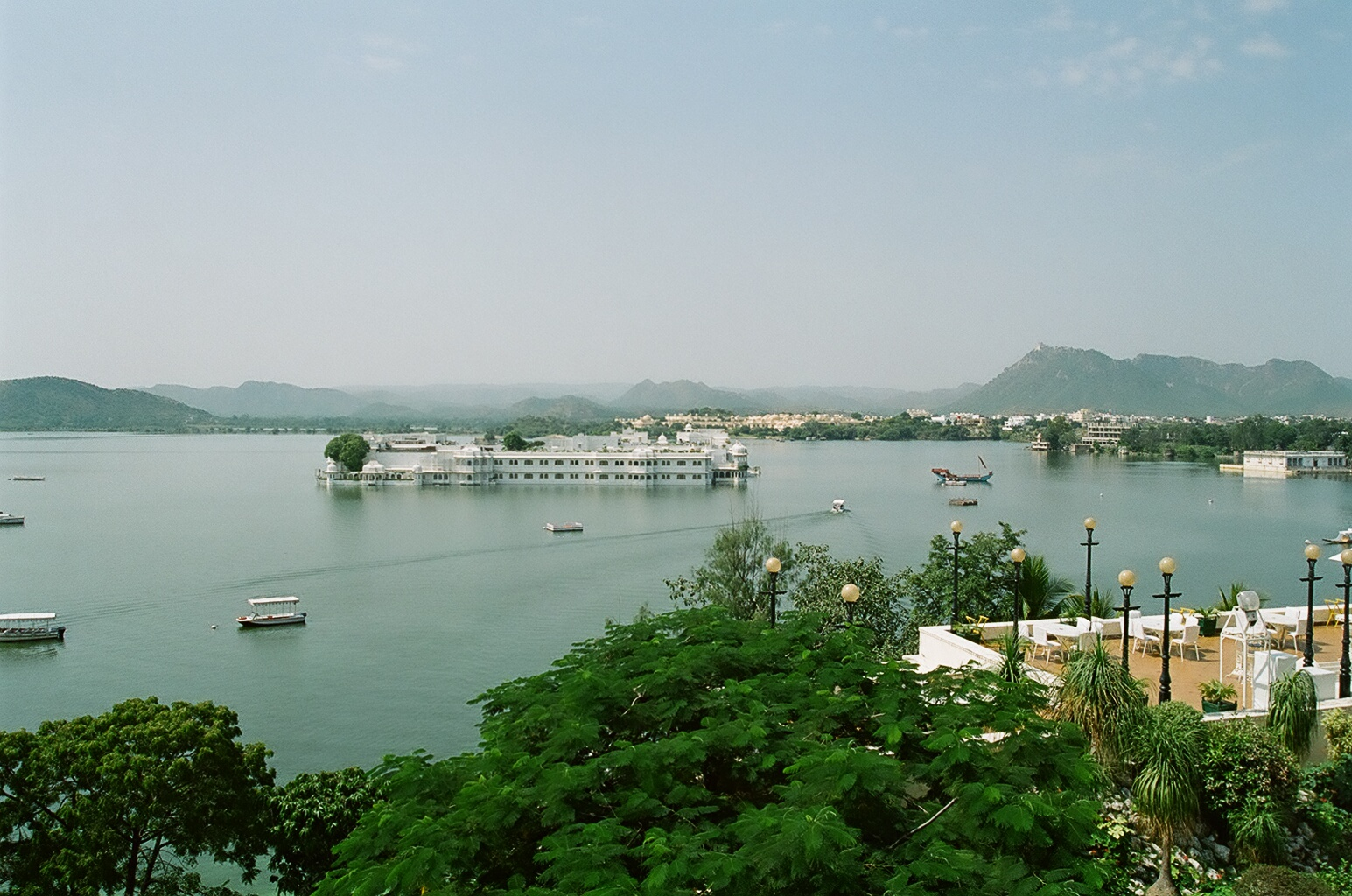

- Location of Lake Pichola in Rajasthan Location of Lake Pichola in India
- Interactive map of Lake Pichola
- Location: Rajasthan
- Coordinates: 24.572°N 73.679°E
- Lake type: Freshwater Lake
- Catchment area: 55 km^{2} (21 sq mi)
- Basin countries: India
- Managing agency: Arvind Singh Mewar
- Max. length: 4 km (2.5 mi)
- Max. width: 3 km (1.9 mi)
- Surface area: 696 ha (1,720 acres)
- Average depth: 4.32 m (14.2 ft)
- Max. depth: 8.5 m (28 ft)
- Water volume: 13.08 million cubic metres (462×10^{6} cu ft)
- Islands: Jag Niwas, the Jag Mandir and Arsi Vilas
- Settlements: Udaipur

Lake Pichola, in Udaipur city in the Indian state of Rajasthan, is an artificial freshwater lake, created in the year 1362, named after the nearby Picholi village. It is one of the several contiguous lakes, and developed over the last few centuries in and around Udaipur city. The lakes around Udaipur were primarily created by building dams to meet the drinking water and irrigation needs of the city and its neighbourhood. Two islands, Jag Niwas and Jag Mandir are located within Pichola Lake, and have been developed with several palaces to provide views of the lake.

There are four islands on the lake:

- Jag Niwas, where the Lake Palace is built.
- Jag Mandir, with the palace of the same name.
- Mohan Mandir, from where the king would watch the annual Gangaur festival celebration.
- Arsi Vilas, a small island which was an ammunition depot, but also a small palace. This one was built by one of the Maharanas of Udaipur to enjoy the sunset on the lake. It is also a sanctuary catering to a variety of birds, including tufted ducks, coots, egrets, terns, cormorants and kingfishers.

Three of the numerous lakes found in the vicinity of Udaipur which connect with the Pichola lake and the Swaroop Sagar Lake connected by an arched bridge built by Maharana Swaroop Singh (1842-1861) which in turn connects to the Fateh Sagar Lake, the crystal-watered lake in the midst of tree-lined hills and the smaller Arsi Vilas.

== History ==
Lake Pichola was built by Maharaja of Parmar Rajputs, in 1362 AD. The name of the lake from nearby village Picholi, since the reign of Maharana Lakha. The Lake is said to have been occupied by Banjaras at the end of the fourteenth century, and the embankment was built by Rana Udai Singh in 1560. The lake name is driven from nearby village Picholi, during the reign of Maharana Lakha. Later, Maharana Udai Singh, impressed by the charm of this lake with the backdrop of green hills, founded the city of Udaipur on the banks of the lake and also enlarged the Lake by constructing a stone masonry dam in the Badipol region on the shore of the Lake.

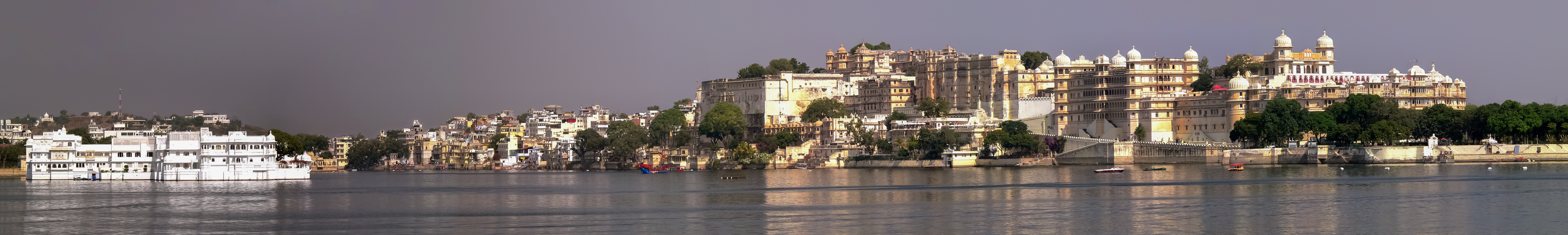
Udaipur Panorama from Jag Mandir Island

The lake's surroundings and the several islands within the lake have been developed over the centuries, with palaces, marble temples, family mansions, bathing ghats or chabutaras (a raised platform, normally within a courtyard); among them are the Lake Palace (converted into a heritage hotel) in the middle of the lake also called the Pichola Palace (pictured) and Jag Nivas located on the Jag Island, the Jag Mandir, the Mohan Mandir (in the northeast corner of the lake built by Jagat Singh between 1628 and 1652), the City Palace of Udaipur (Bansi Ghat) from where boats ply to all other parts of the Lake, the Arsi Vilas Island, which is a sanctuary for birds and the Sitamata Game Sanctuary on the western shore of the Lake.

At several locations where the lake narrows, ornamental arch bridges have been built to span the waterway between the banks.

== Hydrology and technical details ==
The Sisarma stream, a tributary of the Kotra River, drains a catchment of 55 km^{2} from the Aravalli Mountains and contributes to the flows in the lake. The average annual rainfall in the lake basin is 635 millimetres (25.0 in). The lake has a surface area of about 696 ha. It is 4 kilometres (2.5 mi) long and 3 kilometres (1.9 mi) wide, and has depth varying from a minimum of 4.32 metres (14.2 ft) to a maximum of 8.5 metres (28 ft). In the heart of the Lake, a palace called the Lake Palace was built, which is now converted into a heritage palace hotel. This palace built in marble in 1746 by Maharana Jagat Singh II, 62nd successor to the royal dynasty of Mewar, spreads across the 1.6 hectares (4.0 acres) island and is claimed to be as impressive as the Taj Mahal. At the southern end, a dam was built across the major tributary to facilitate the Banjara tribesman to ford the stream with animals carrying grains. After 1560, Maharana Udai Sing II strengthened the dam (to a height of 15.24 m) when he established the city of Udaipur around the picturesque Lake. Machchala Magra hill, to the south of the city palace complex, is part of the old city wall and the small fort of Eklinggarh and the temple. The fact that the Pichola lake was built by nomadic gypsies testifies that the rulers of Mewar encouraged people to build water harvesting structures.

During drought conditions because of lower rainfall & degradation of the catchment the lake becomes dry (pictured). During the years 1998 to July 2005. the Lakes of Udaipur were reportedly dry.

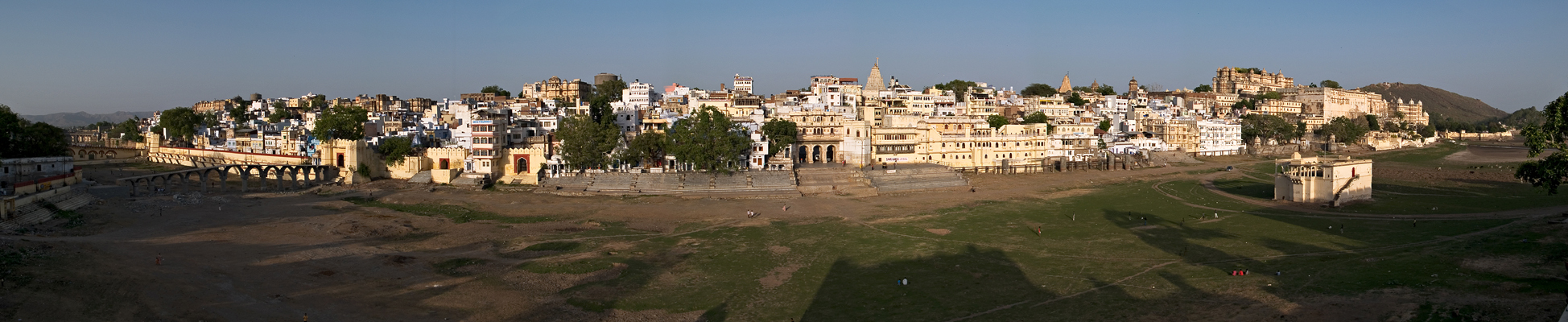
Udaipur Panorama with dried Lake Pichola

== Water quality ==
According to a study carried out by the "Centre of Advanced Study in Geology", Punjab University, the water quality of the lake has a high sodium and Bicarbonate content, which is attributed to the continental weathering due to anthropogenic pressure (tourist influx), intense development activities in the basin area and untreated effluent from municipal and domestic sewage into the Lake. The semi arid conditions of the area, saline and alkaline soils/groundwater conditions and weathering of the silicate rock exposed in the drainage basin are assessed as the reasons for the supply of major ions. The report said that

The increase in phosphate loading and consequent depletion of silica suggests biological consumption of the latter. The observed chemical data of the Pichola Lake was used to predict the mineral assemblages in the carbonate and aluminosilicate system. It demonstrates that calcite and dolomite are the possible minerals that are in equilibrium with the lake water system and that the lake water chemistry is in the range of stability of kaolinite

The average of the pollution parameters recorded at random intervals during 2005-2006 as reported by the Rajasthan State Pollution Control Board in 2006 are:

- Dissolved Oxygen 6.33 mg/L; pH Value No.8.27; BOD 2.66 mg/L; Nitrate 0.11 mg/L; Nitrite 0.0045 mg/L; Fecal Coliform 16 MPN/100; and Total Coliform 110 MPN/100.

The assessment of quality status determined that water is polluted and needs remedial measures to be implemented to rectify the situation.

Studies conducted by Jheel Sanrakshan Samiti (Udaipur Lake Conservation Society) – JSS - a Non Governmental Organization (NGO) set up in 1992 for Ecological, Limnological and Hydrological Conservation of Udaipur Lake System, has found growth of water hyacinth, the lake bottom is also covered with a thick mat of submerged vegetation, presence of floating micro algae which are detrimental to the public health, and also harbor varieties of harmful organisms. This degree of pollution makes chlorination and treatment by other chemicals ineffective to render the water potable.

== Threats to the lake ==
Some of the issues identified as causes for deterioration of the Lake environment are:

- Polluted due to disposal of sewerage directly into surface drains or surface water body
- Large-scale and uncontrolled mining of marble and other minerals leading to heavy deforestation of hill slopes.
- Catchment area degradation and soil erosion causing deposition of sediments into the Lake and disturbance to the ecosystem of the area.
- Encroachments
- Dumping of solid, liquid waste, destruction of submergence areas and over exploitation of water
- Poor governance
- Lack of citizens and stakeholders participation in management of the Lake
- Due to deteriorated water quality, out of 42 species of fishes including Mahseer and all major carp fishes only 17 species of fishes have survived.

== Lake restoration works ==
Steps undertaken to restore the lakes by the NGOs, such as JSS and concerned government organizations are:

- Water hyacinth has been eradicated
- Biological measures undertaken
- Sewerage plan has been partly implemented.
- Catchment area conservation of the Pichhola Watershed project of Rs 34.2 million covering an area of 12702 ha under funding of the Government of India is under implementation

== Gallery ==
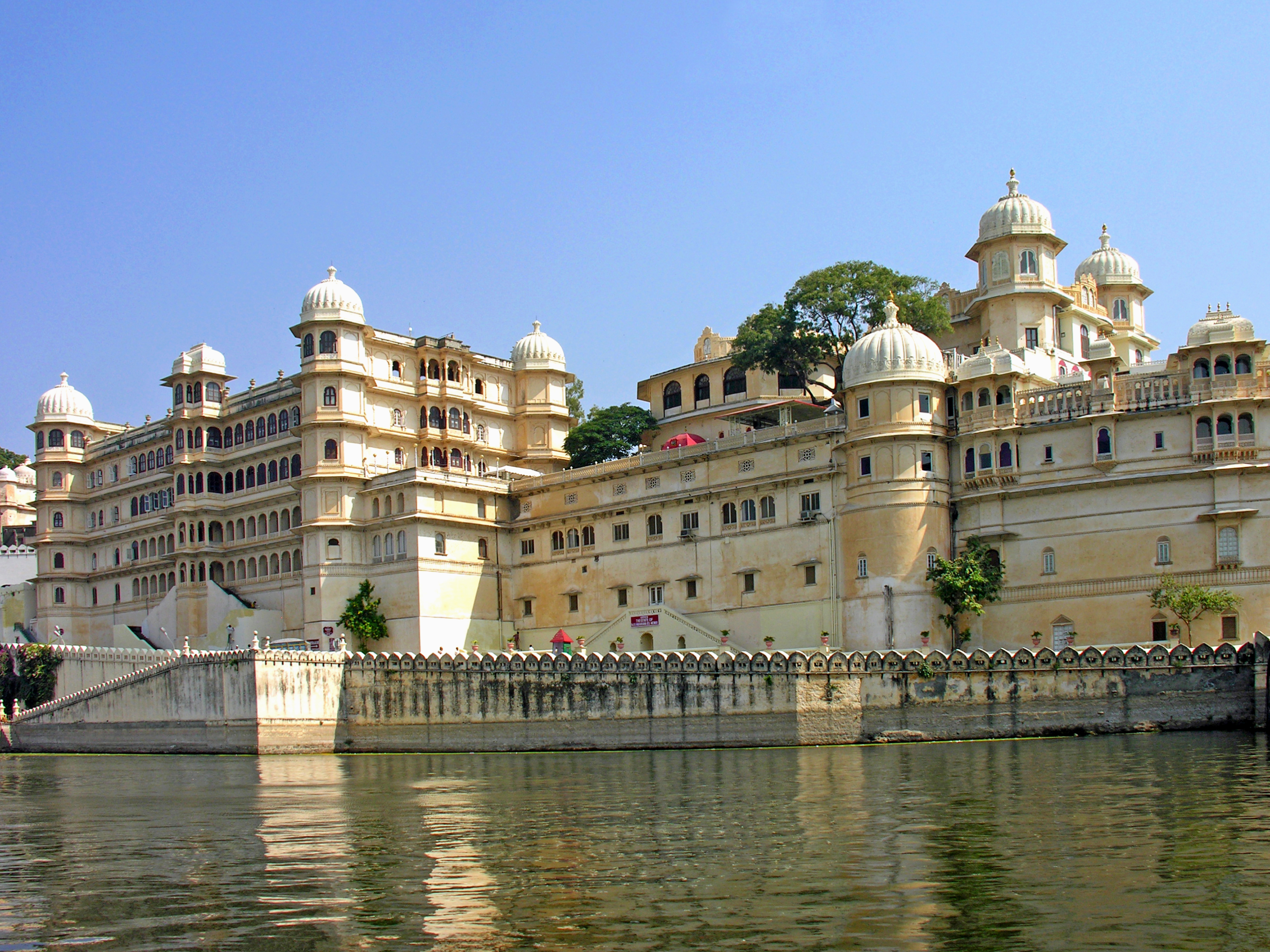
City Palace on Lake Pichola

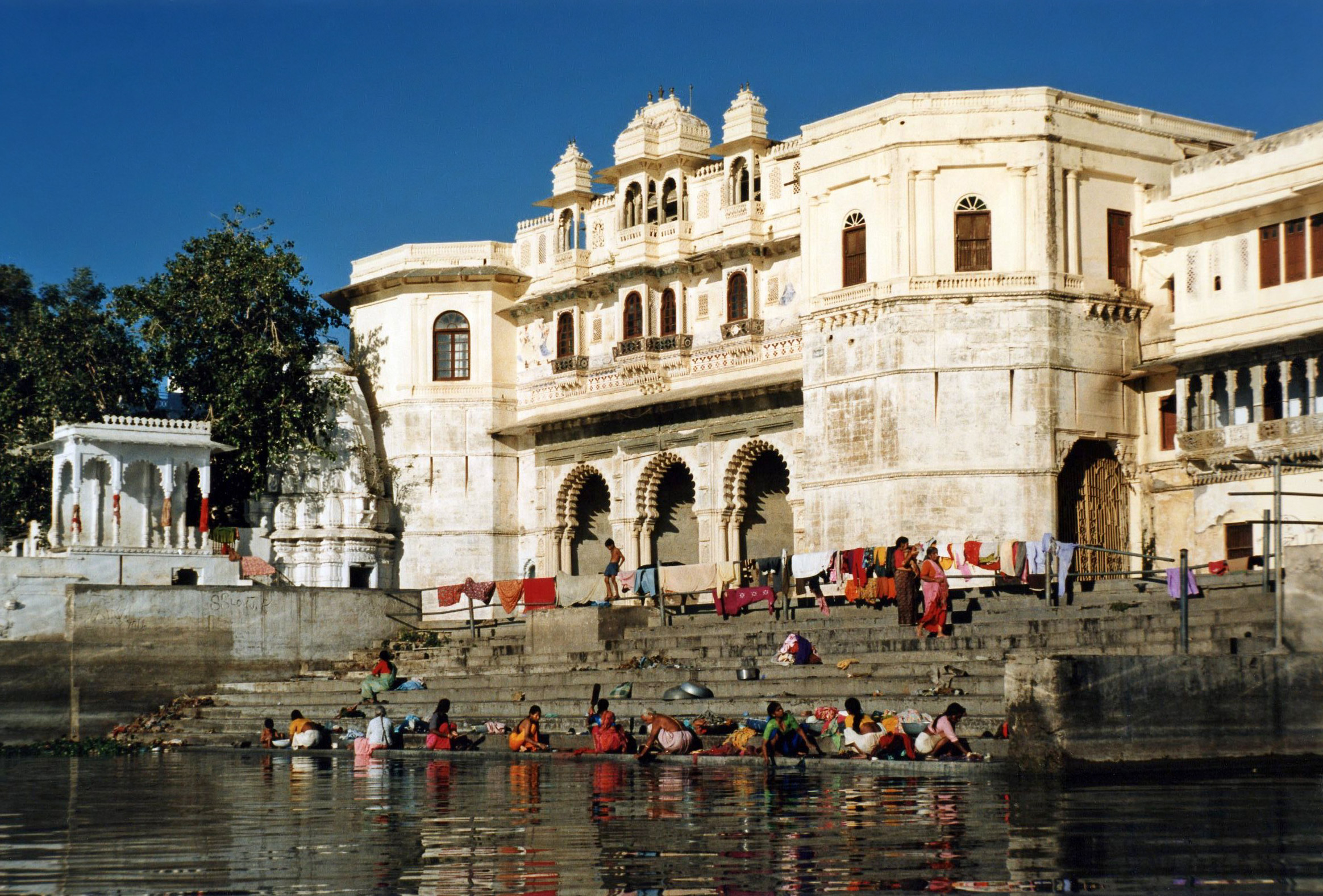
Ghats on the lake

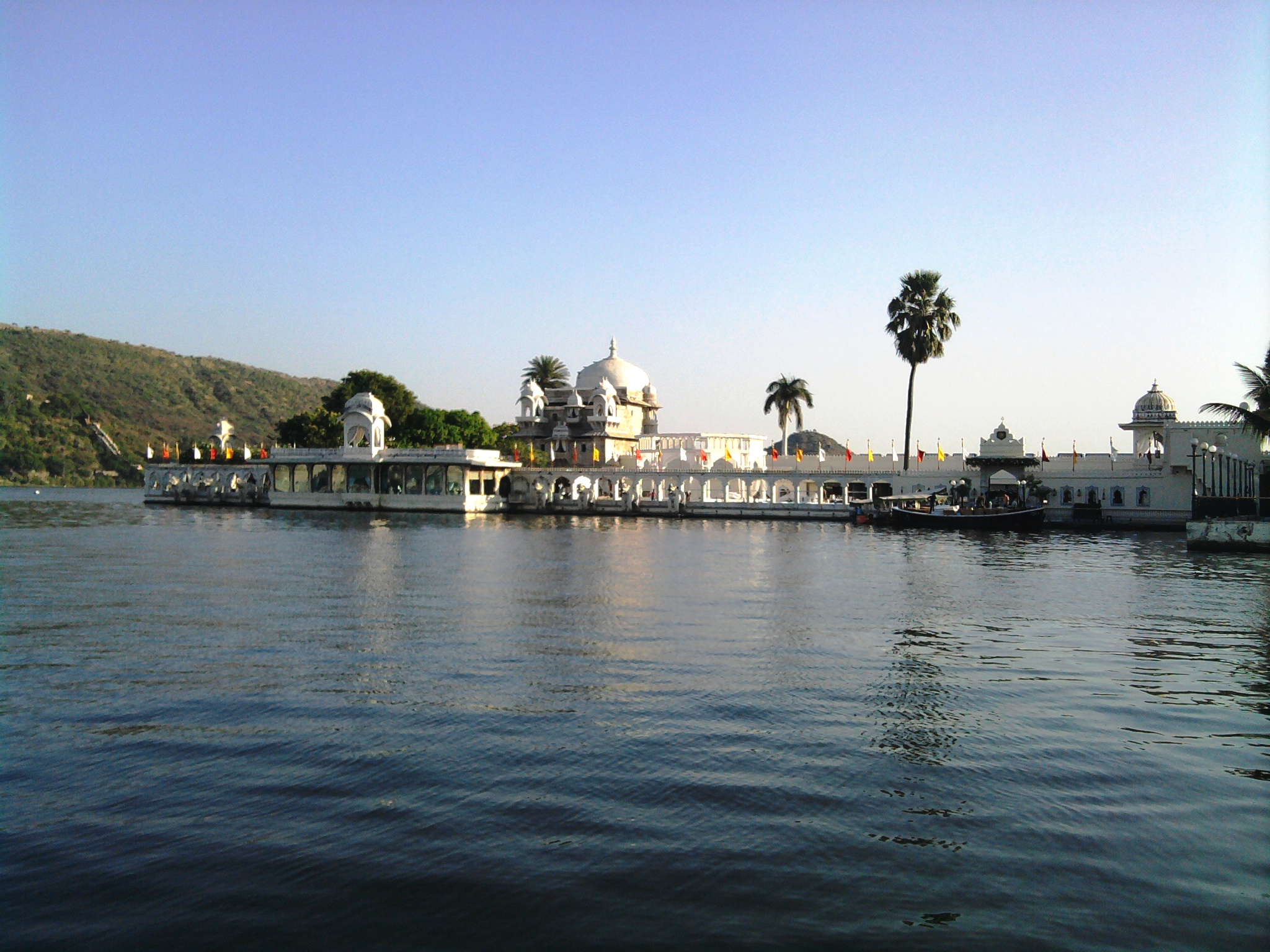
Jag Mandir on Lake Pichola.

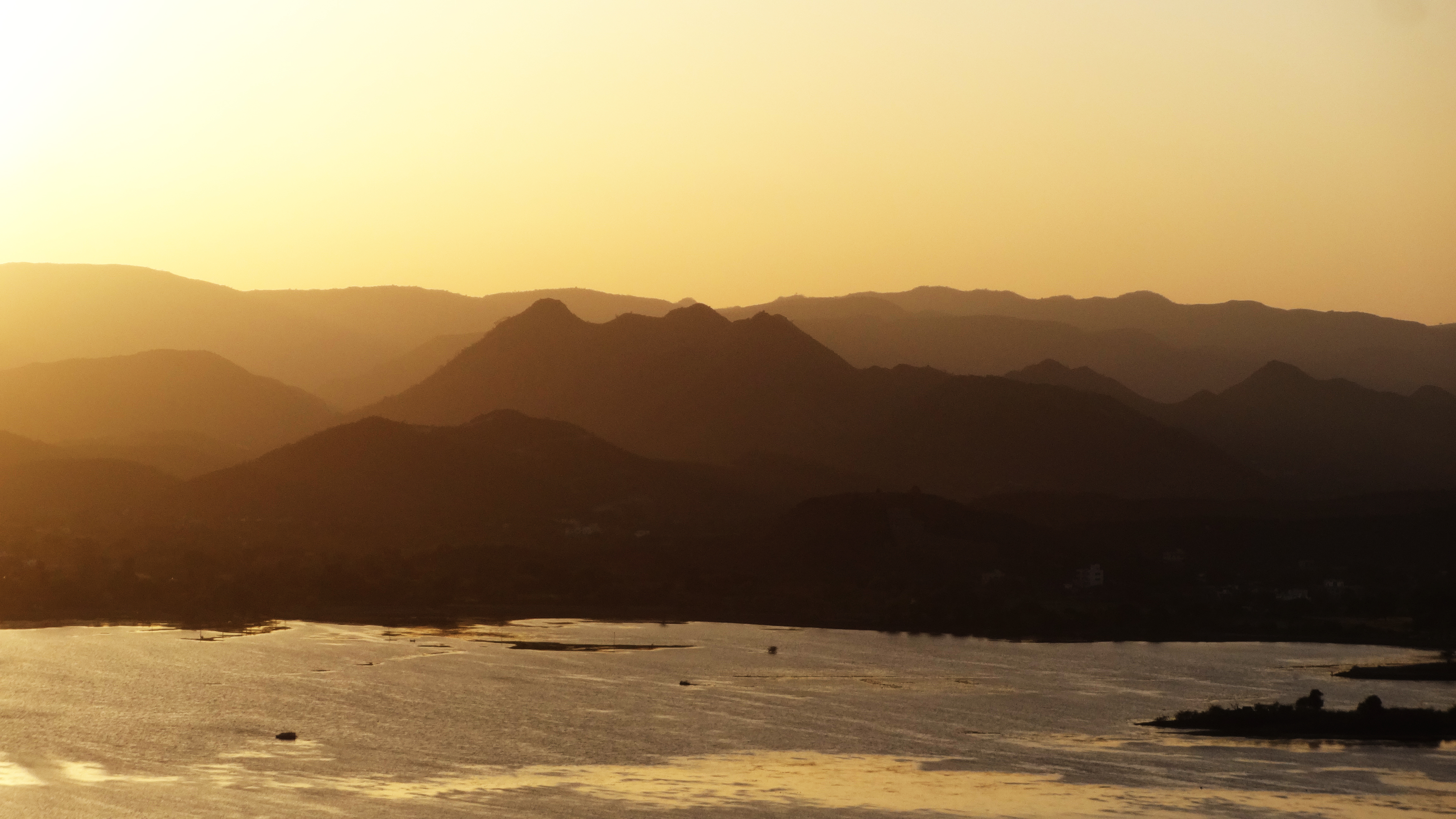
Sunset at Pichola lake, seen from Karni Mata Temple

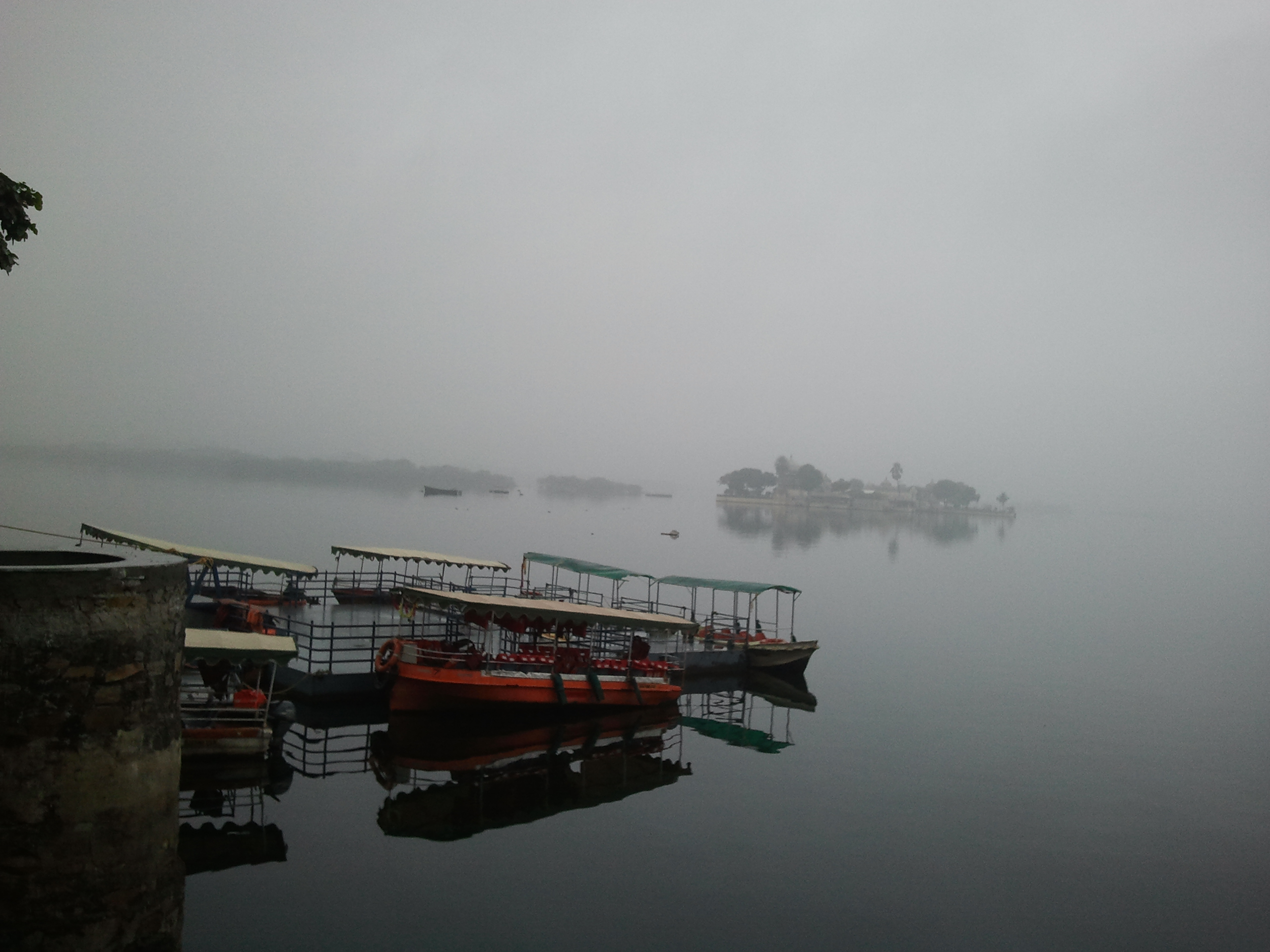
Boats floating in Lake Pichola, and Jag Mandir in background, in a typical cloudy day in rainy season.

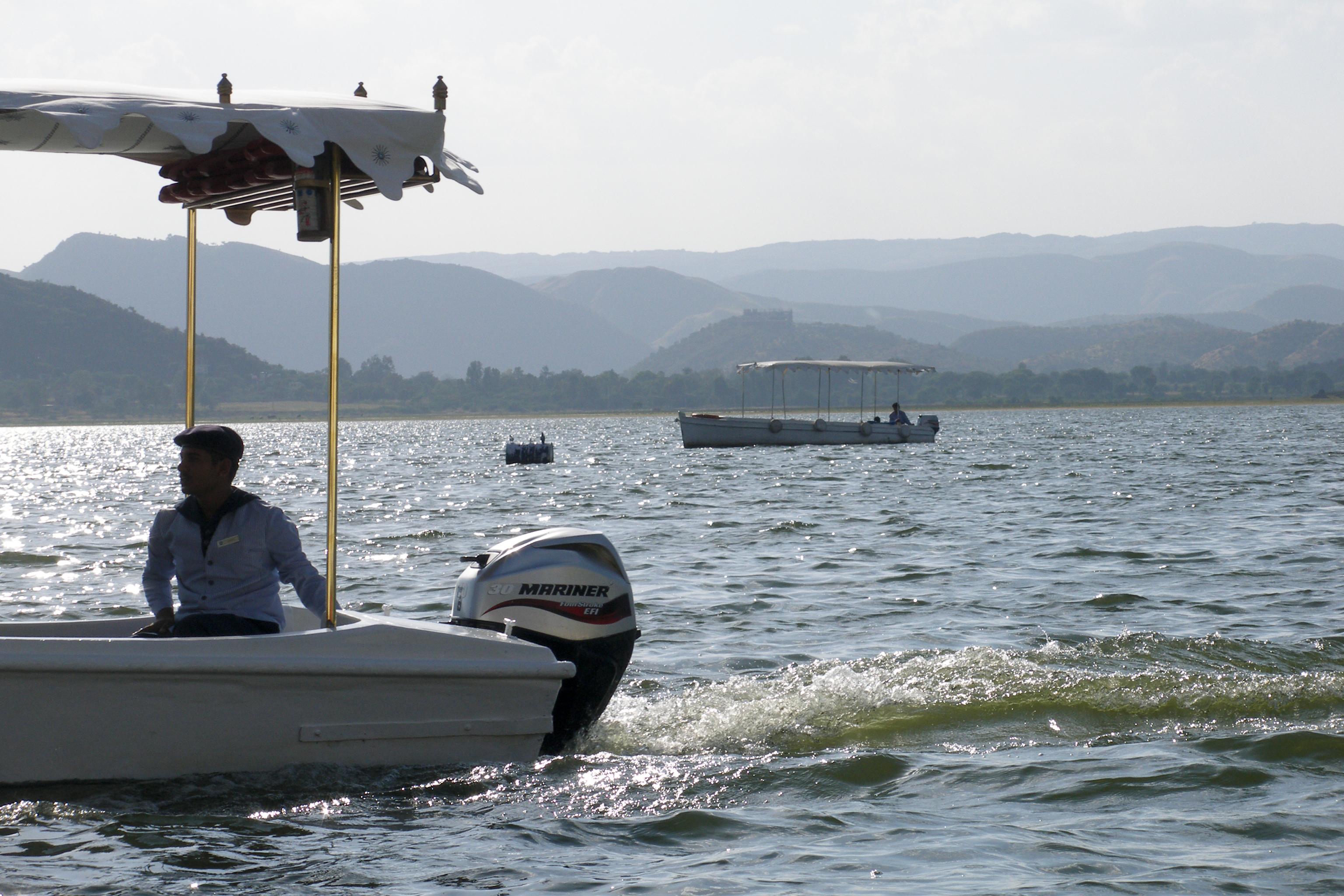
Boats at the lake.

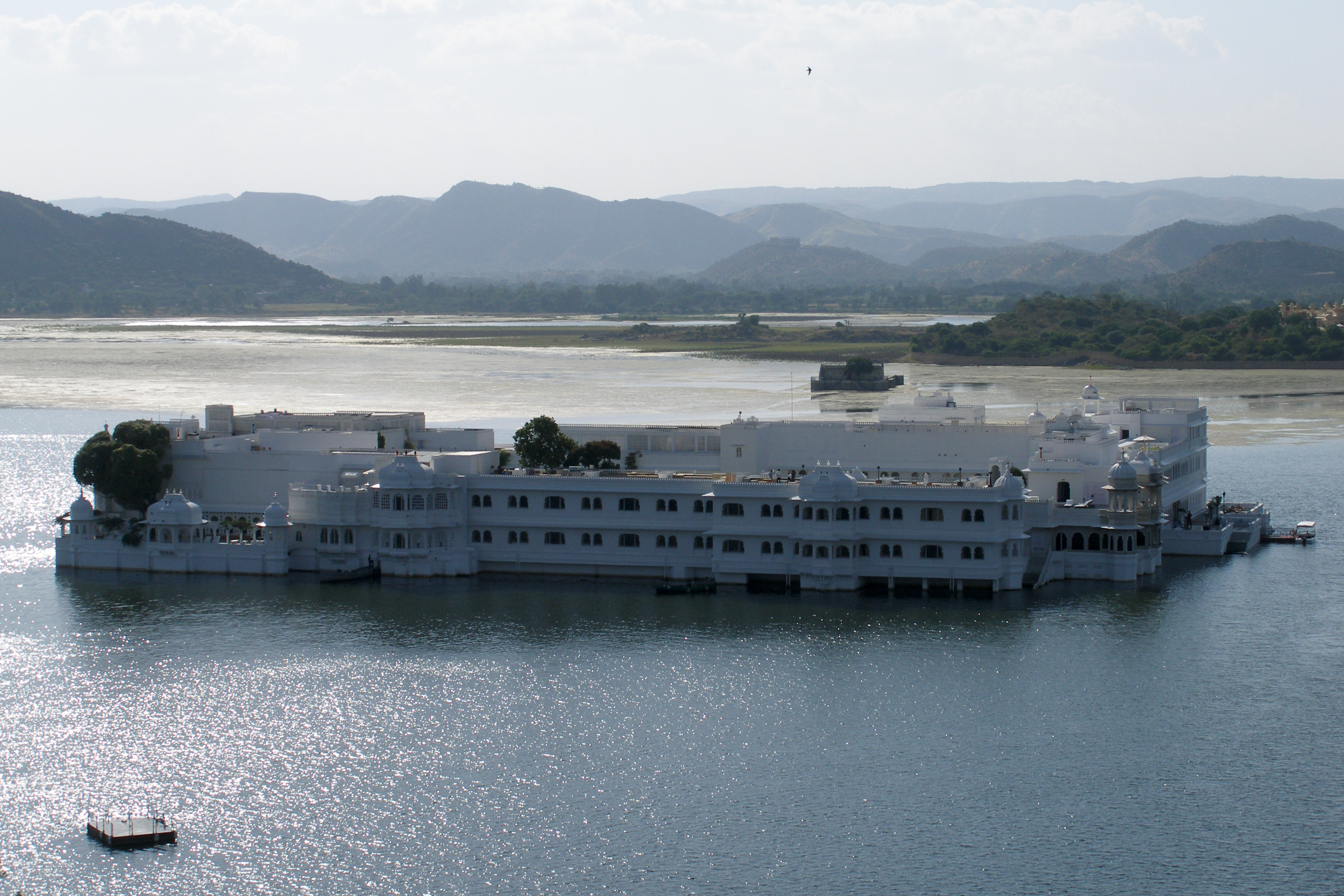
Lake Palace on Lake Pichola.

== See also ==
- List of lakes in India
