= List of tourist attractions in Udaipur =

Udaipur city, also known as the 'City of Lakes' and 'Venice of the East', is a city and tourist destination in Rajasthan, India.

== Lake Badi ==
Badi Lake is an artificial freshwater lake built in the village of Badi, about 12 km from the city of Udaipur. Built by Maharana Raj Singh I (1652–1680), it was aimed to counteract the devastating effects of a famine. This lake covers an area of 155 km2., and is graced by three artistic chhatris (kiosks or pavilions). Devoid of any commercial activity, the Badi Lake gives a view of a never-ending expanse providing a serene and calm atmosphere to the visitors.

== City Palace ==
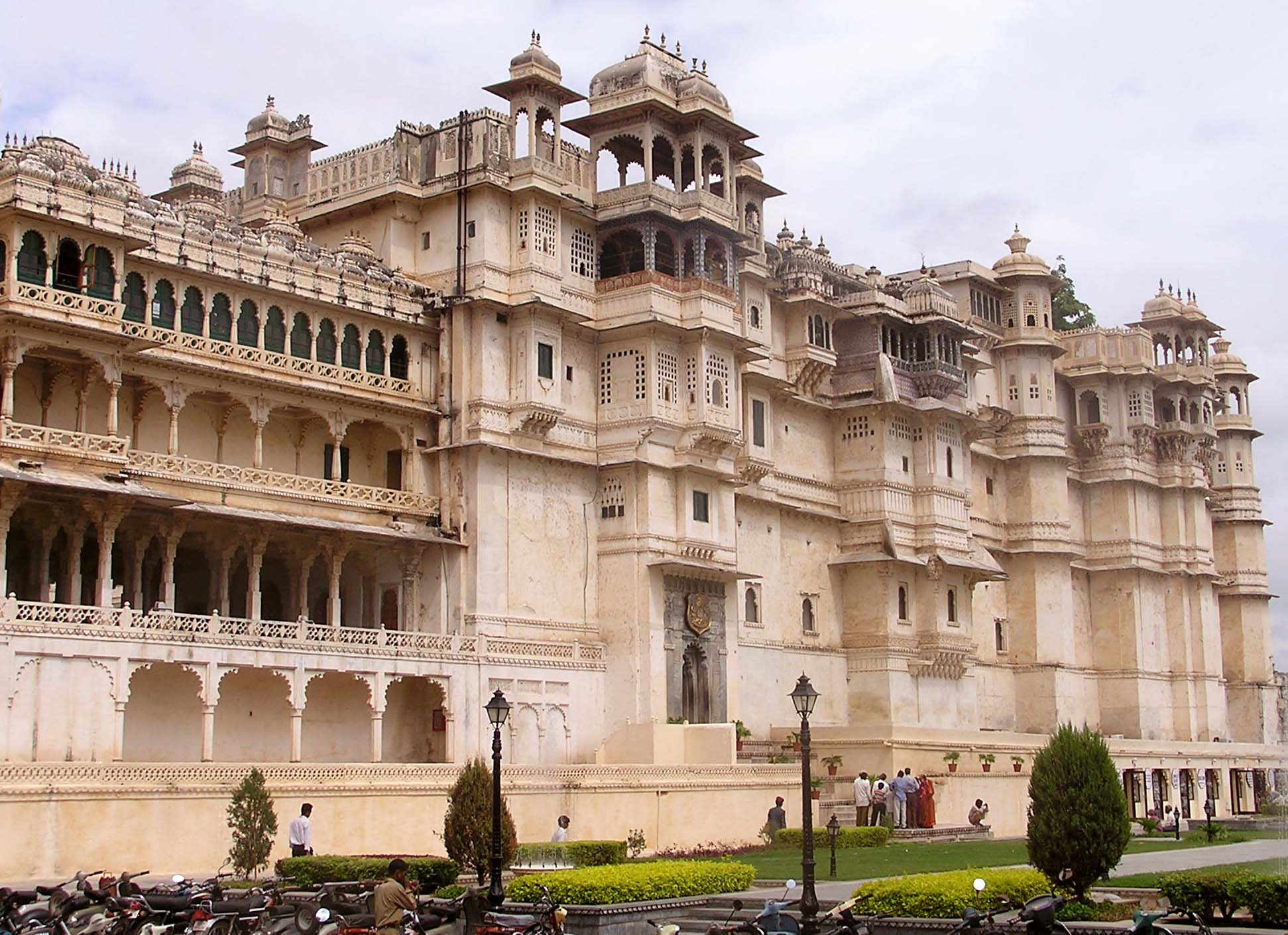
City Palace, Udaipur

City Palace, a 400-year-old palace, is located on the east bank of the Lake Pichola. It comprises a series of vilas, halls, gateways, courtyards, overlapping parations, terraces, corridors and gardens. Monuments like the Lake Palace, Jag Mandir, Jagdish Temple, Monsoon Palace, and Neemach Mata temple, are all in the vicinity of the palace complex. City palace was also used for shooting of movies like Octopussy and Goliyon Ki Raasleela Ram-Leela. A 1991 documentary film called Jag Mandir consists of footage of an elaborate theatrical performance for the Maharana Arvind Singh Mewar at the City Palace staged by André Heller.

== Jag Mandir ==
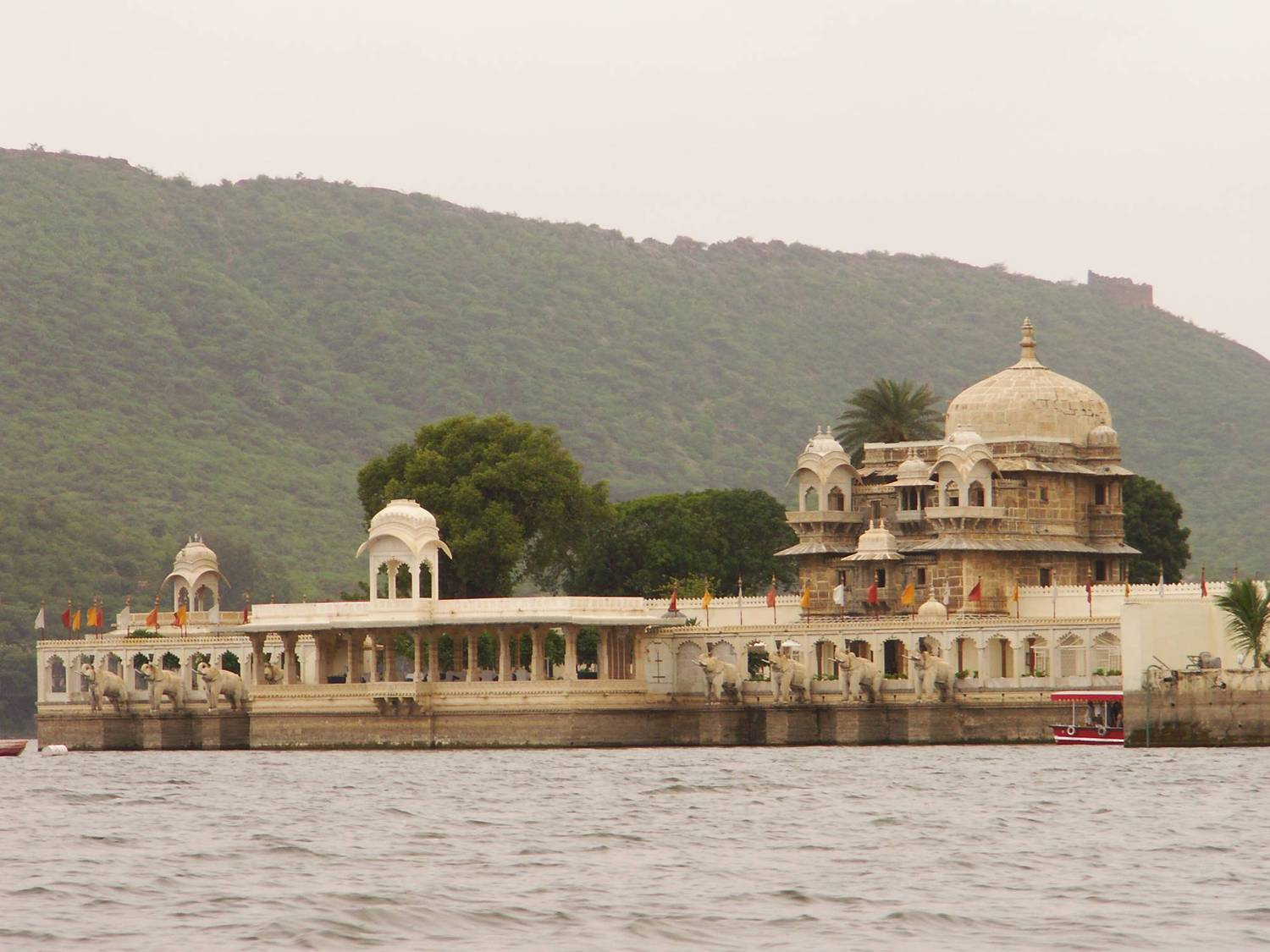
Jag Mandir

Jag Mandir palace is built on an island in Lake Pichola and is now the Jagmandir Island Palace, a heritage hotel.

== Jagdish Temple ==
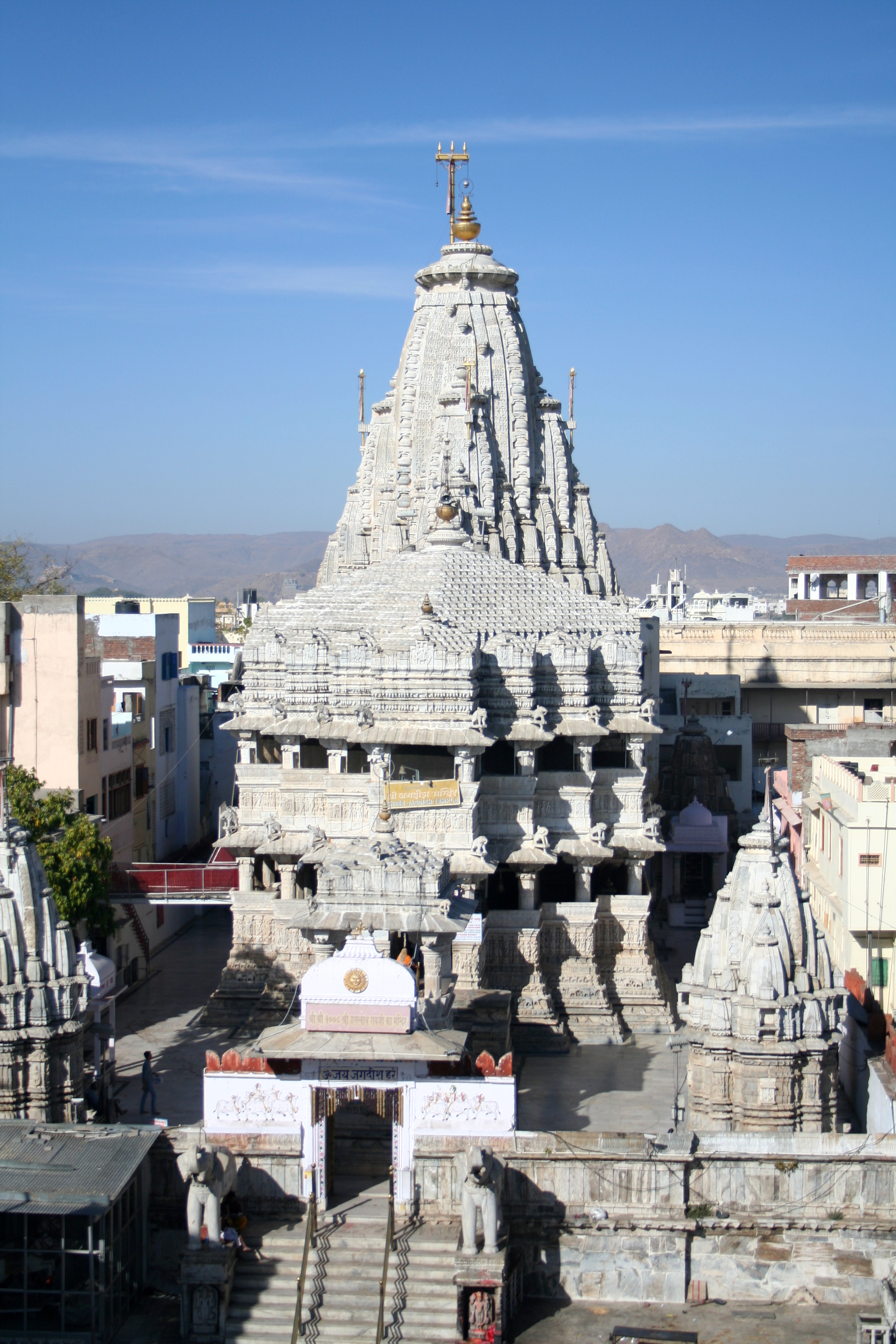
Jagdish Temple

Jagdish Temple is an example of either Māha Māru or the Māru-Gurjara architecture

== Lake Palace ==
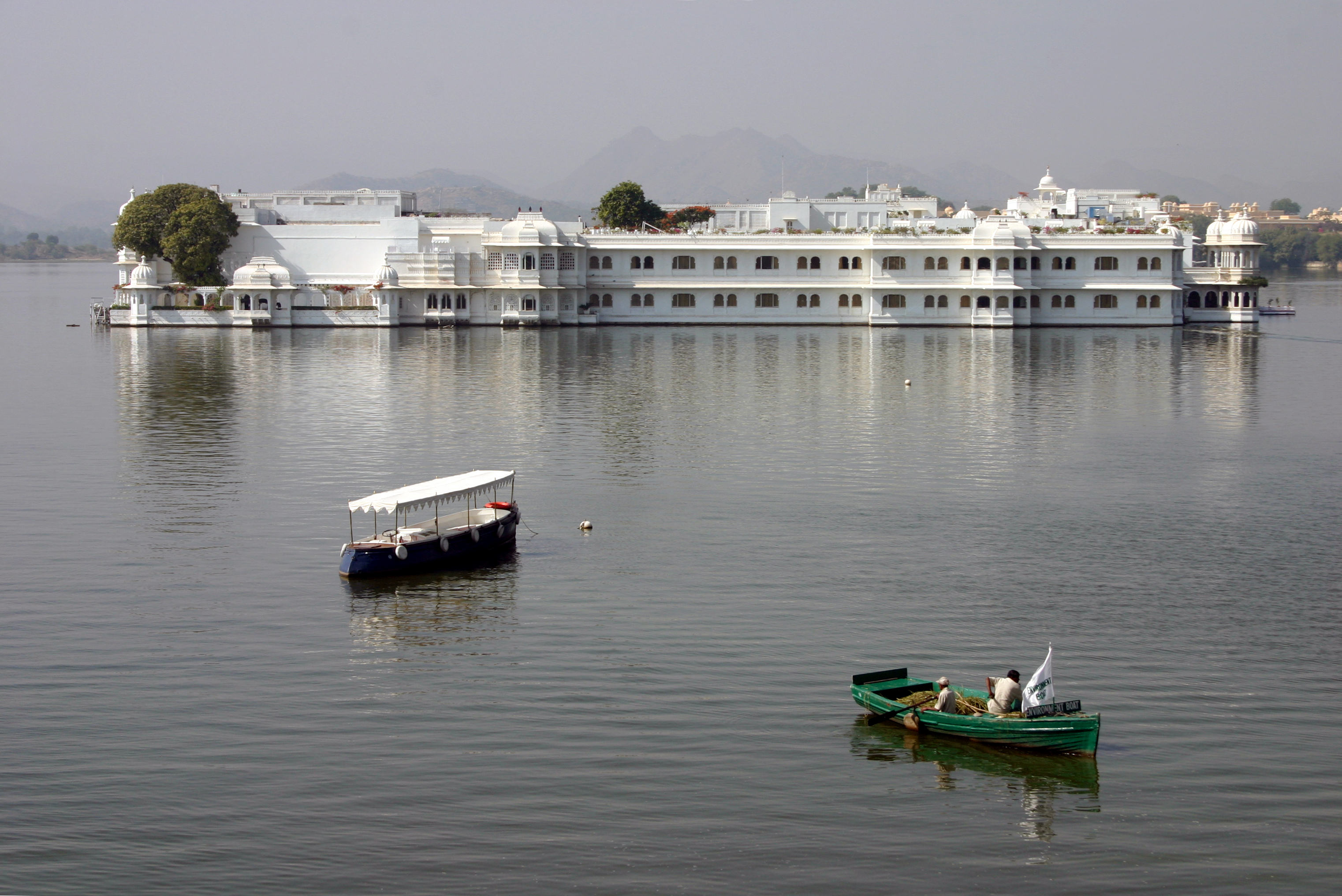
Lake Palace

Lake Palace (formerly known as Jag Niwas) is a luxury hotel, which has 83 rooms and suites featuring white marble walls. The Lake Palace is located on the island of Jag Niwas in Lake Pichola, Udaipur, India, and its natural foundation spans 4 acres (16,000 m2). Built between 1743 and 1746 under the direction of the Maharana Jagat Singh II (62nd successor to the royal dynasty of Mewar) of Udaipur, the private summer resort of the erstwhile royal family has been turned into a luxury hotel. The hotel has been ranked as amongst the best luxury heritage hotels in the country.

== Sajjangarh Biological Park ==
Sajjangarh Biological Park is a zoo.

== Monsoon Palace ==
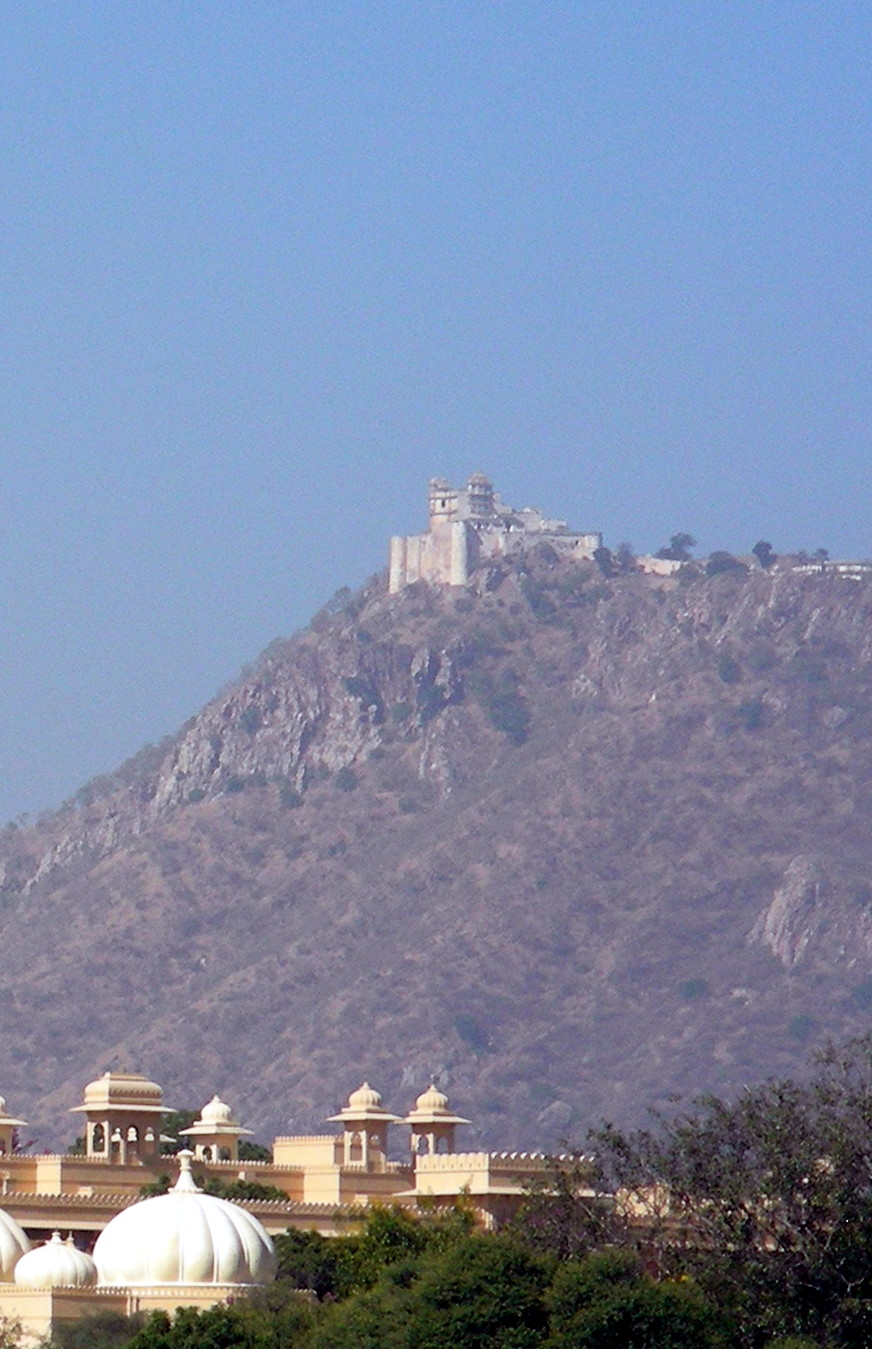
Monsoon Palace at the hilltop

Monsoon Palace was built in 1884 by Maharana Sajjan Singh of the Mewar Dynasty giving it the name Sajjangarh. The palace is near Fateh Sagar Lake. The palace was also used in the 1983 James Bond film Octopussy.

== Moti Magri ==
Atop the Moti Magri or Pearl Hill, overlooking the Fatah Sagar Lake is the memorial of the Rajput hero Maharana Pratap with a bronze statue of the Maharana astride his favourite horse, "Chetak".

== Sajjangarh Biological Park ==
Sajjangarh Biological Park, a zoological garden, is situated just beneath the Monsoon Palace (also known as Sajjajgarh Garh Palace), around 4 km from the city center. The zoo houses vast varieties of animals and birds brought in from different parts of the world. At present, it has more than 60 animals of 21 species including tigers, panthers, lions, ostriches, alligators, and rhesus monkeys. Within two months of its inauguration, the park received more than 46,000 visitors in a month, generating a revenue of Rs 1.4 million for the forest department, which is a record in itself.

== Saheliyon ki Bari ==
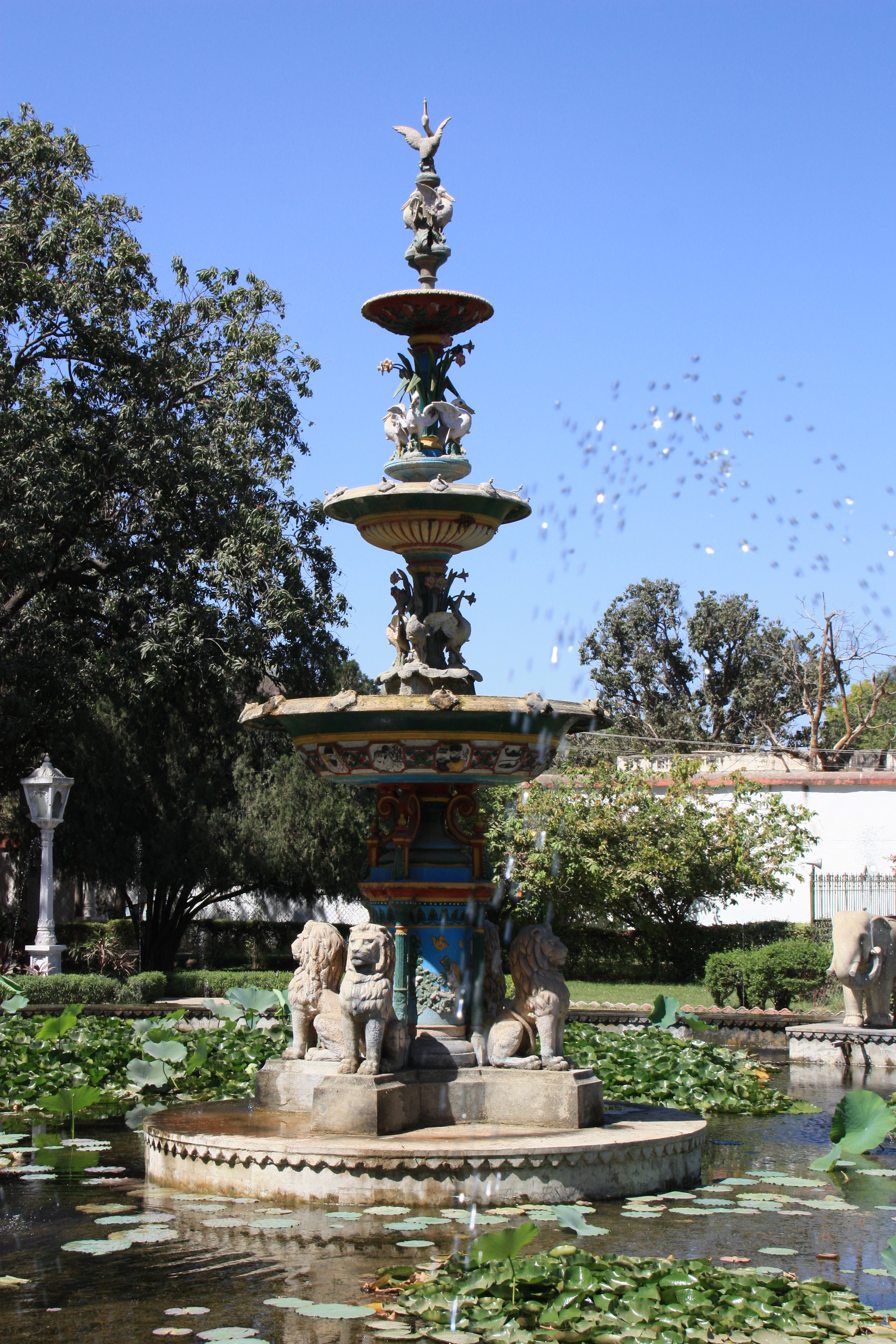
Saheliyon-ki-Bari

Saheliyon-ki-Bari or 'Courtyard of the Maidens' is a garden and a popular tourist destination. With fountains, kiosks, a lotus pool and marble elephants, this garden was built from 1710 to 1734 by Maharana Sangram Singh for the royal ladies. This renowned garden is located on the banks of Fateh Sagar Lake and also has a small museum with the collection of royal households.

== Statue of Belief ==
The Statue of Belief also known as Vishwas Swaroopam was open on 29 October 2022 for tourists'. It is located 44 km. form Udaipur in Nathdwara, Rajasthan.

== Places nearby ==
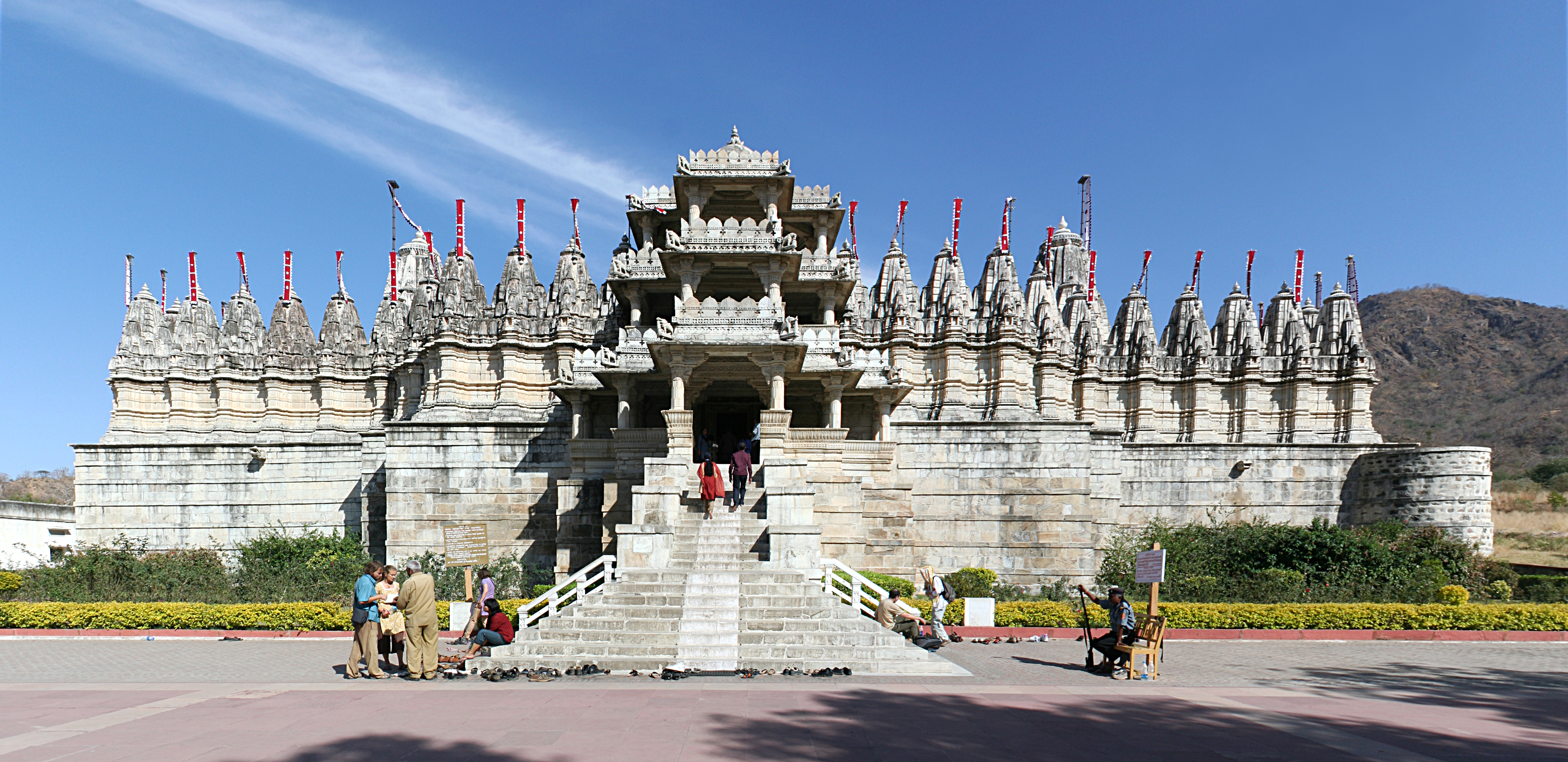
Ranakpur Jain temple in Ranakpur, Rajasthan

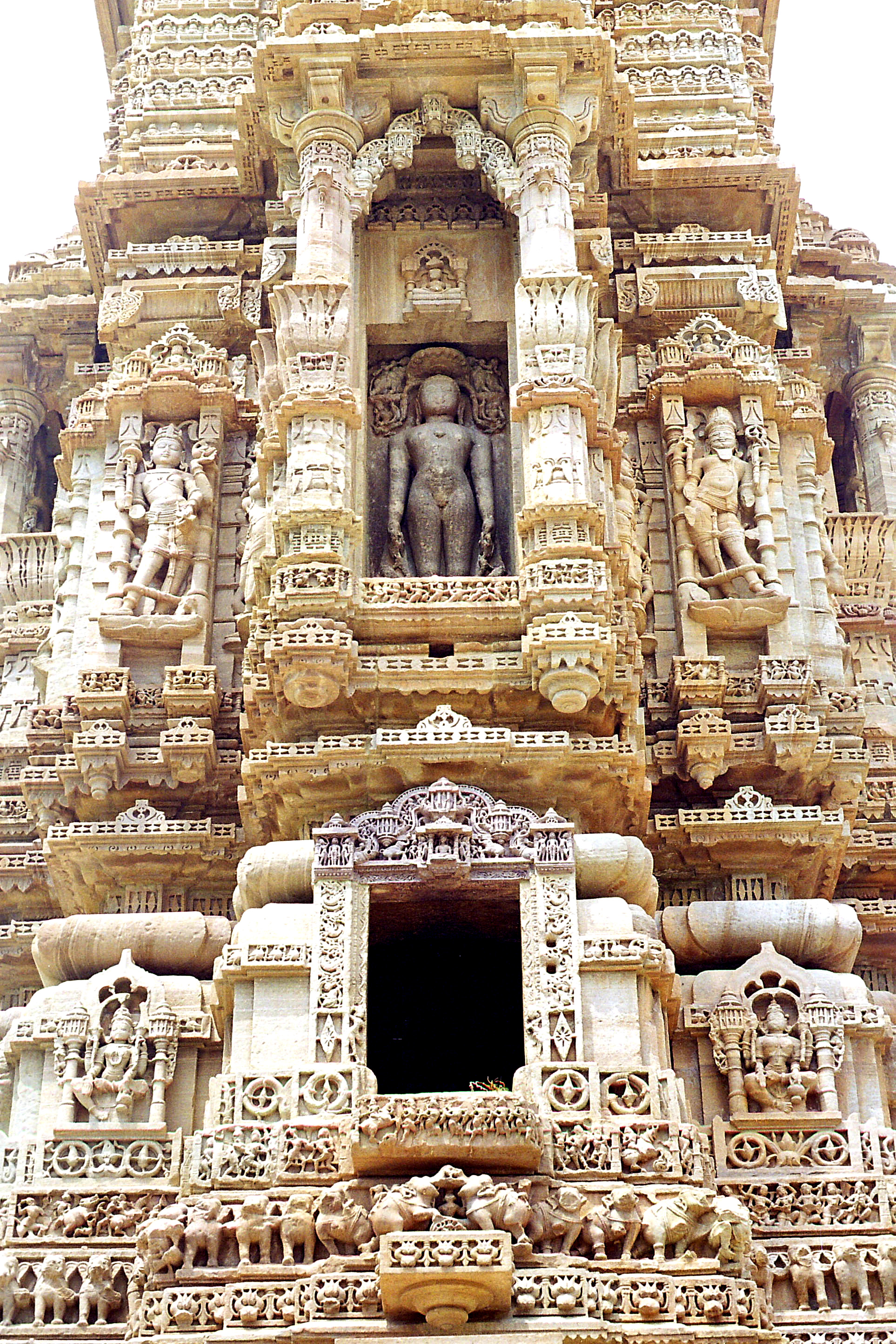
Kirti Stambh, Chittor Fort

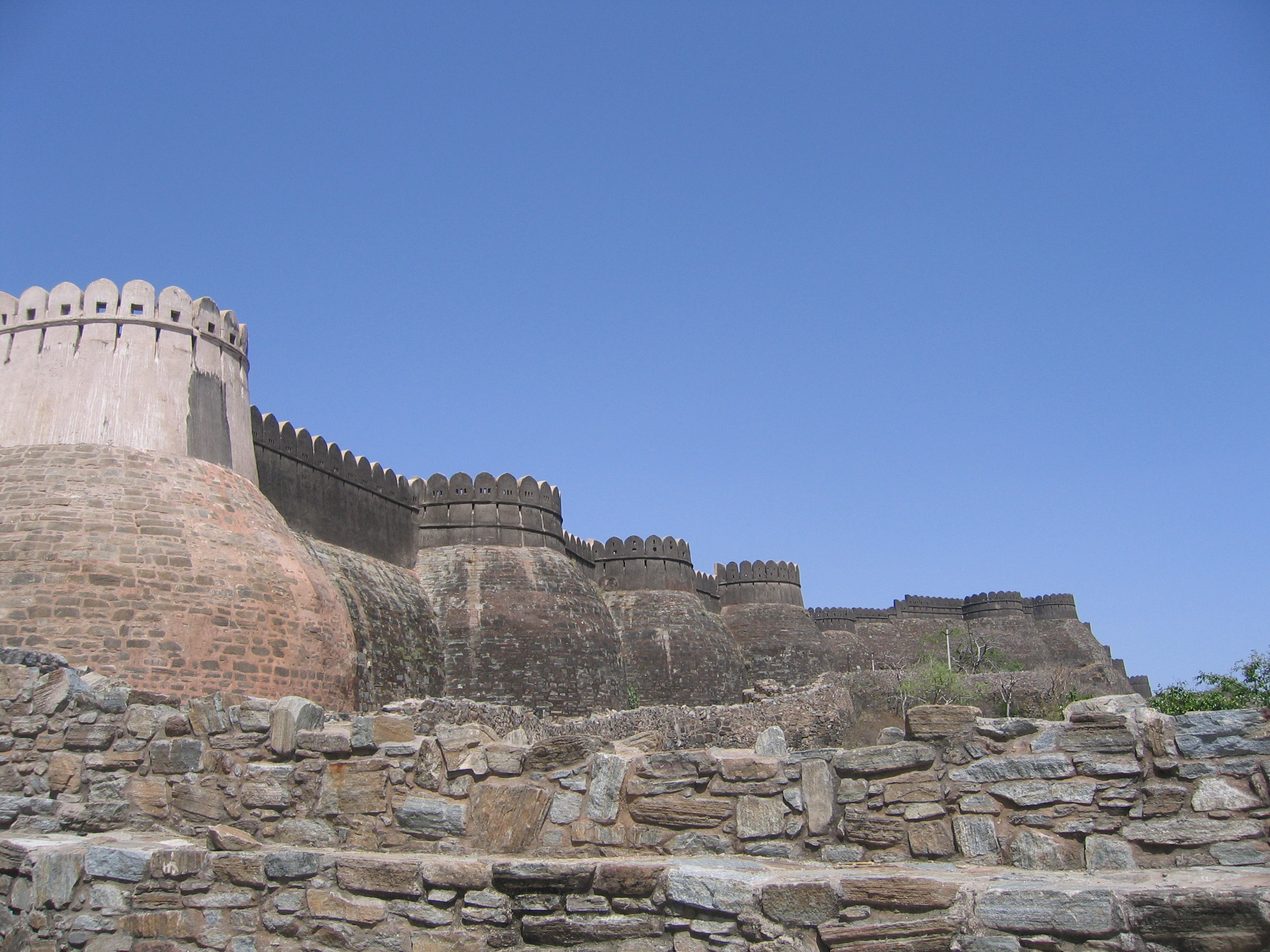
Wall of Kumbhalgarh Fort, world's second-longest continuous wall

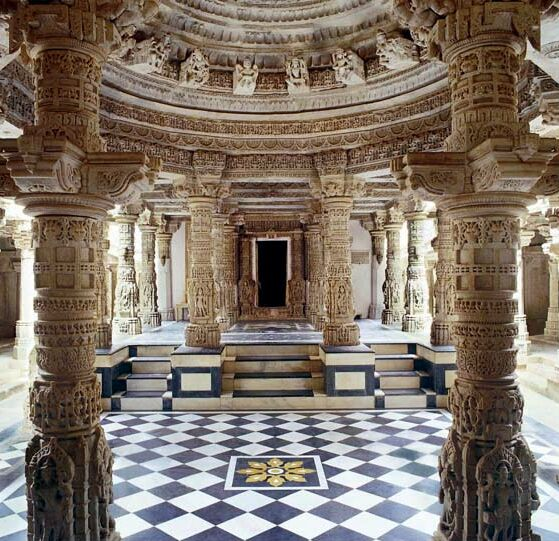
Dilwara Temples

- Nathdwara – Shri Nathdwara (a pathway to Lord Shri Krishna) lies 48 km from Udaipur and literally means "the gateway to the Lord". Devotees throng the shrine in large numbers during occasions of "Janmashtmi", the day of the Lord's birth, and other festivals like Holi. It is famous for Shrinathji Temple and its pichwai paintings, with Shri Krishna in the centre, and is recognized for profuse use of gold colour.
- Ranakpur – a village that is home to one of the most important Jain temples. 1400+ marble pillars support the temple. Opposite the Jain temple is the much older Sun Temple. It is located in Pali District, 110 km north of Udaipur.
- Chittorgarh – About 112 km from Udaipur, Chittorgarh was the capital of Mewar from 734 AD to 1559. Chittor Fort is a massive fort situated on a hilltop near Chittorgarh town in Rajasthan state in India.
- Haldighati – a mountain pass in Rajsamand District that hosted the battle between Rana Pratap Singh of Mewar and the Mughal emperor Akbarl; it is now a memorial site.
- Kumbhalgarh – a 15th-century fortress, built by Rana Kumbha of Mewar, with 36 kilometres of walls. Over 360 temples are within the fort. It also has a wildlife sanctuary. It is located in Rajsamand District, 90 km from Udaipur. The vista from the top of the palace typically extends tens of kilometers into the Aravalli hills.
- Aayadh Jain tirth
- Mount Abu – a popular tourist hill station. Dilwara Temples are the chief attraction of this place.
- Eklingji – a temple complex situated nearly 22 km in the north of Udaipur. It was built in 734 A.D. and consists of 108 temples chiseled out of sandstone and marbles; it is devoted to the royal family of Mewar.
- Kumbhalgarh Wildlife Sanctuary – located in the most rugged of the Aravali in Pali, Rajsamand and Udaipur districts of Rajasthan. It takes its name after the historic fort of Kumbhalgarh, which comes into view over the park. It is 578 km^{2} in area and at an altitude of 500 to 1,300 metres. It is home to a large variety of wildlife, some of which are highly endangered species. The wildlife includes wolf, leopards, sloth bear, hyena, jackal, jungle cat, smabhar, nilgai, chaisingh (the four horned antelope), chinkara, and hare.
- Kankroli and Rajsamand Lake – Dwarakadish Temple, Nau Choukiya, JK Tyre factory
- Adinda Parshwnath – a famous Jain temple of "Parshwnath ji", 42 kilometres from Udaipur. It was the only south-faced Jain temple in India.
- Rishabhdeo – also known as "Kesariya ji", it is a famous Jain pilgrimage center sacred to Jains. its local name is Dhulev.Kesariyaji Tirth is a Jain temple located in Rishabhdeo town of Udaipur District of Indian state of Rajasthan. The temple is considered an important pilgrimage center by both Digambara and Śvētāmbara sect of Jainism. Further, Rajasthan High Court, in its judgment dated 30th March 1966, stated that it was, indisputably, a Śvētāmbara Jain temple.
- Jagat – known as Khajuraho of Rajasthan, it is famous for the Jagadambeshwari Durga temple.
- Bambora – a fort and Idana mata temple nearby.
- Jaisamand Lake – the second biggest man-made lake in Asia.
- Udaisagar Lake – one of the five prominent lakes of Udaipur, built by Maharana Udai Singh in 1565.
- Sita Mata Wildlife Sanctuary
- Galiakot – Mazar-e-Seyadi Fakhruddun Shaheed
- Dungarpur – Gap sagar, city palace
- Banswara – Mahi dam and Tripura Sundari temple
- Chavand – the third capital of Mewar and also the place where Great Maharana Pratap spent his last 21 years.
- Bhinder – fort, pond, temples, Drgah Sultan-ji-Shahhed.
- Kanor – Adeshware Ji is an ancient Jain Temple near Kanore, about 3 km
- Sanwaliaji Temple – 70 km east from Udaipur famous krishna temple.
- Charbhuja ji – at Gadbor village in Rajsamand district, one of the char-dham of Mewar, 90 km in north from Udaipur.
- Sardar garh – fort
