= Taj Aravali Resort & Spa =

Luxury hotel and resort in India

- Interactive map of the Taj Aravali Resort & Spa area

General information
- Location: Near, 1, Kheemach Kheda, Kodiyat Main Rd, Forest Chowki, Bujra, Udaipur, Rajasthan 313031
- Coordinates: 24.5792°N 73.6114°E
- Opened: 21 December 2018
- Owner: Taj Hotels

Other information
- Number of rooms: 176
- Parking: Yes

Website
- www.tajhotels.com/en-in/hotels/taj-aravali-resort-and-spa-udaipur

Taj Aravali Resort & Spa is a luxury resort located near Udaipur, Rajasthan, at the foothills of the Aravalli Range. Spread over 27 acres, the resort opened in 2018 and offers 176 rooms, suites, and tents designed with regional decor elements. The property blends traditional Rajasthani architecture with modern amenities, providing guests with a retreat-like experience surrounded by natural landscapes.

== Location ==
The resort is located about 9 kilometers from Udaipur and easy accessibility to all the local attractions- City Palace (9 km), Monsoon Palace (6.2 km), Taj Lake Palace (9.6 km), Fateh Sagar Lake (9.5 km) etc. The nearest airport, Maharana Pratap Airport, is approximately 30 kilometers away, while the Udaipur Railway Station is 11 kilometers from the resort.

== History ==
The resort was inaugurated in 2018 as part of the Taj Hotels brand, which is owned by the Indian Hotels Company Limited (IHCL). The design of the resort draws inspiration from the traditional architecture and culture of Rajasthan. The resort's architecture blends Rajasthani aesthetics with modern amenities, creating a contemporary interpretation of a royal retreat.

== Dining ==
- Javitri: The vegetarian restaurant that serves traditional rajasthani cuisine.
- Ridgeview: An all-day dining restaurant offering a mix of international and Indian dishes.
- Tiri: A modern fine dining restaurant with an emphasis on Mediterranean and global cuisine.
- Odeypore Lounge Bar: A type of indoor bar that serves finger food.

== Wellness and recreation ==
=== Jiva Spa ===
Taj's spa brand, Jiva Spa provides wellness and meditation, including Ayurvedic therapies, massages, and wellness rituals.
