= Lake Badi =

Lake in Rajasthan, India

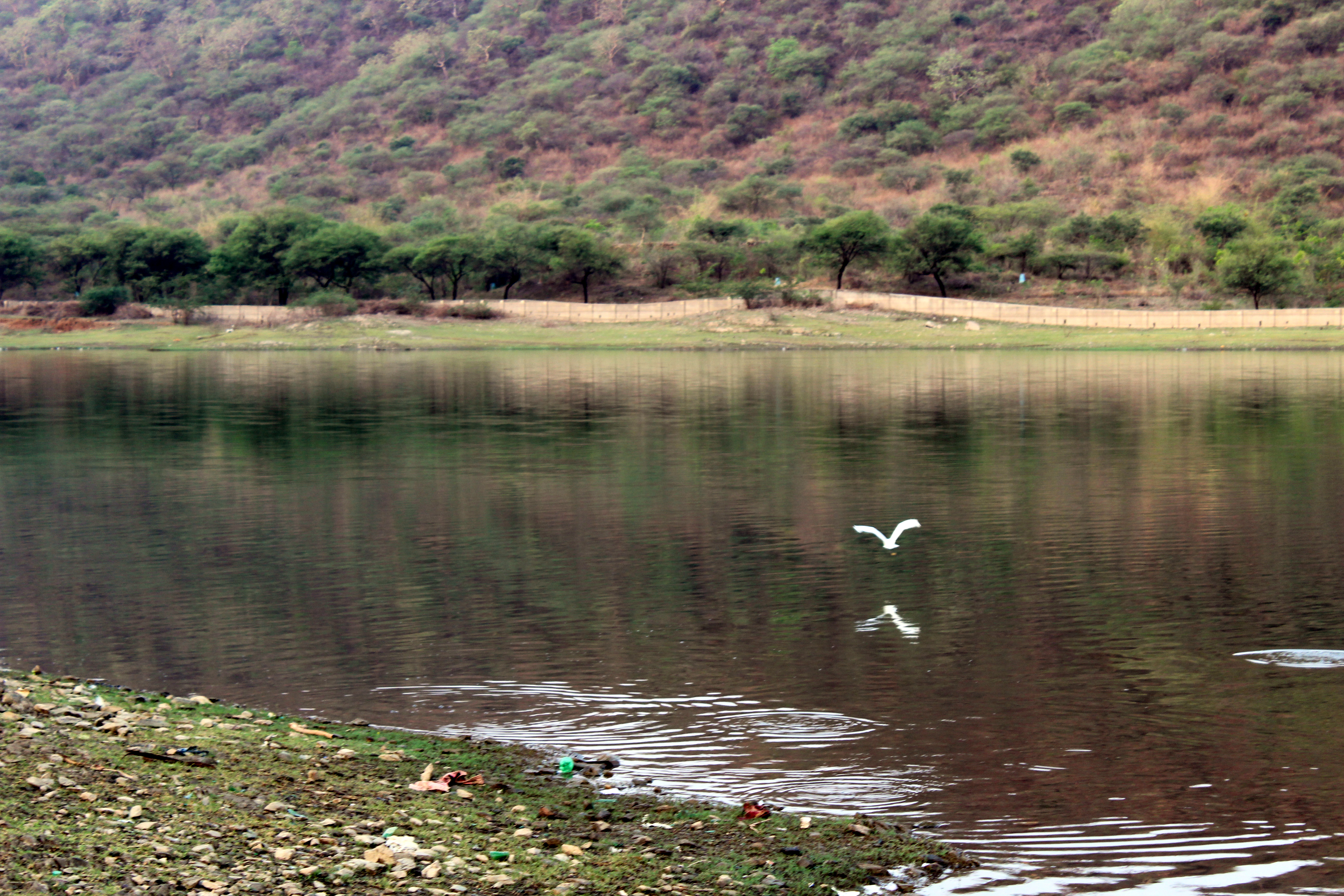
- View of Badi Lake

- Location within Rajasthan
- Interactive map of Lake Badi
- Location: Udaipur, Rajasthan
- Coordinates: 24.616105°N 73.622127°E
- Lake type: Freshwater
- Max. length: 2.32 km (1.44 mi)
- Max. width: 567 m (1,860 ft)
- Surface area: 0.8 km^{2} (0.31 sq mi)

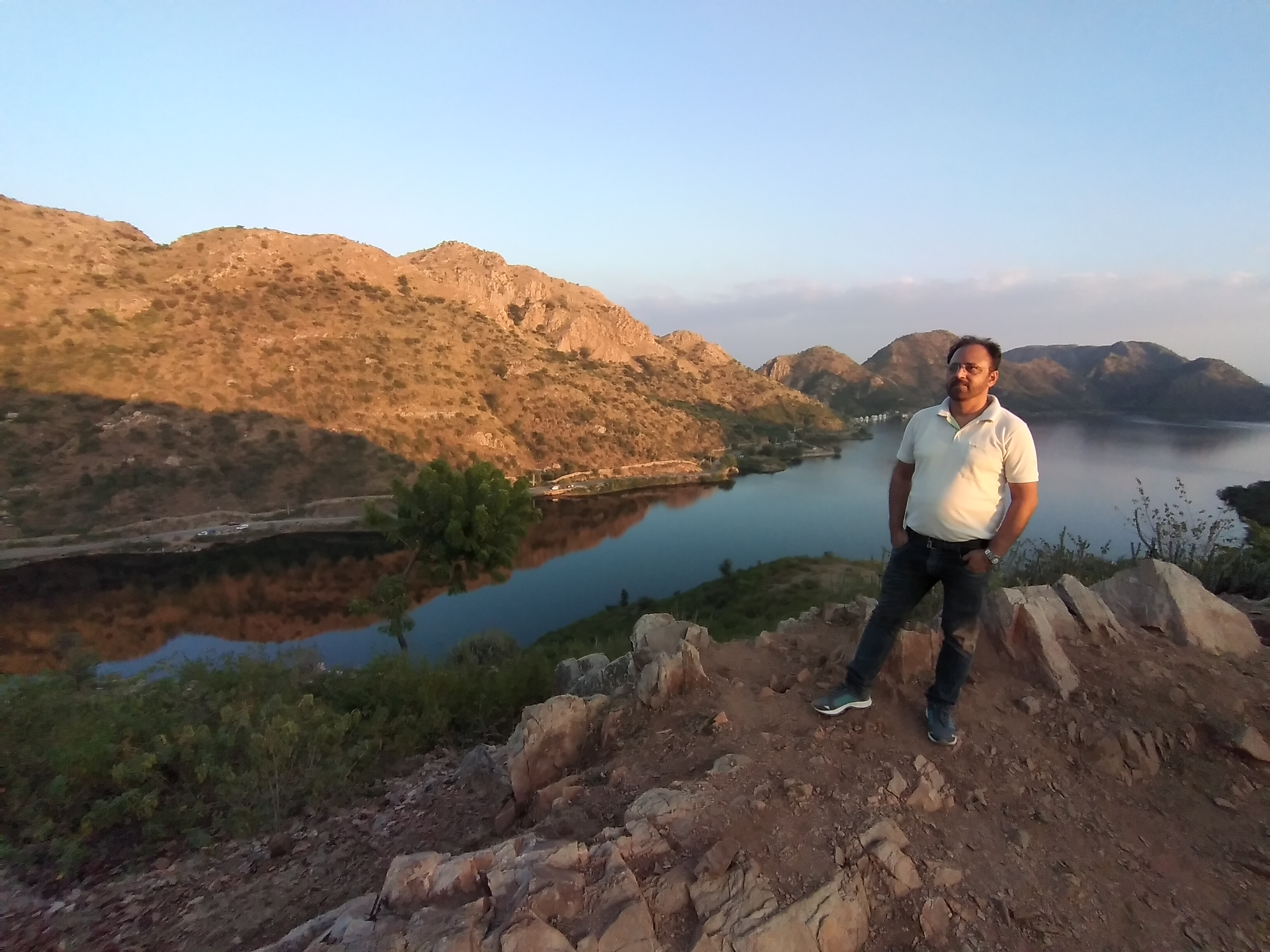
View of Badi Lake, Udaipur, Rajasthan, India from Bahubali Hills

Lake Badi is an artificial freshwater lake situated in Udaipur city in the Indian state of Rajasthan. currently famous for a view of a hill

1. Bahubali Hills which is small trek nearby lake
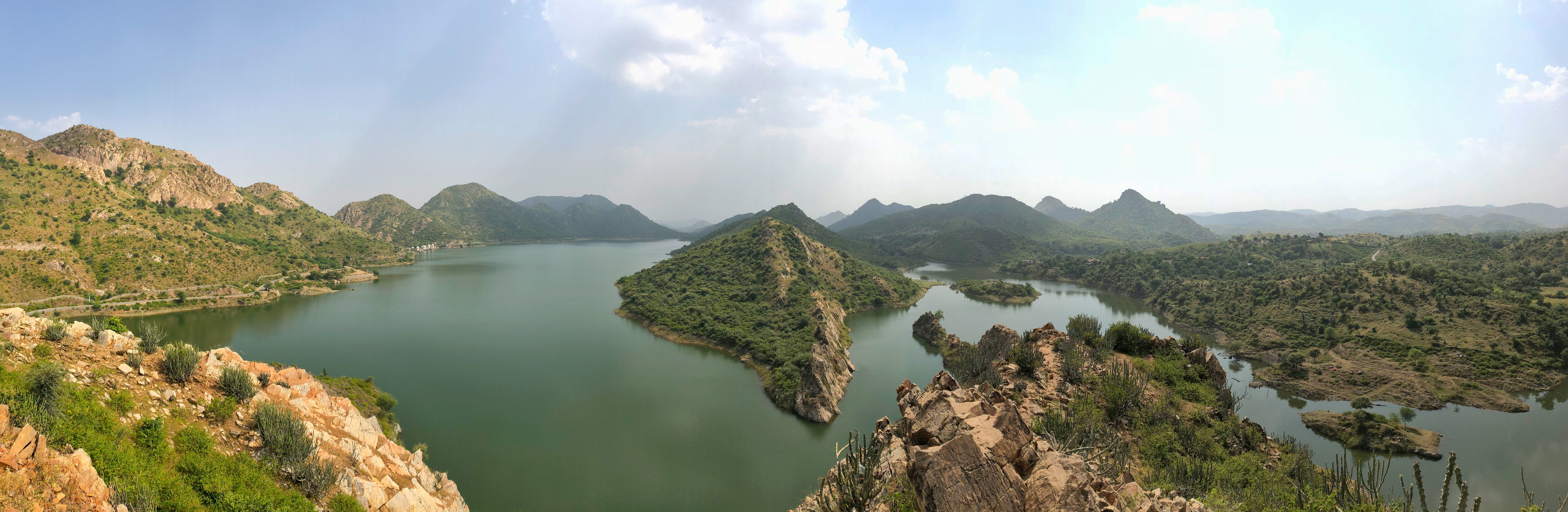
  Baahubali hills

== History ==
The lake was built in the village of Badi, about 12 km from Udaipur, by Maharana Raj Singh I (1652–1680) to counteract the devastating effects of a famine. He named it Jiyan Sagar after his mother Jana Devi. The lake covers an area of 155 km2 and has an embankment 180 m long and 18 m wide, graced by three artistic chhatris (kiosks or pavilions). During the drought of 1973, Lake Badi supplied water to the people of Udaipur.

== See also ==
- List of tourist attractions in Udaipur
- ( shivalik dam )
- ( Bada Madar lake )
- ( Chota Madar Lake )
