= Sajjangarh Biological Park =

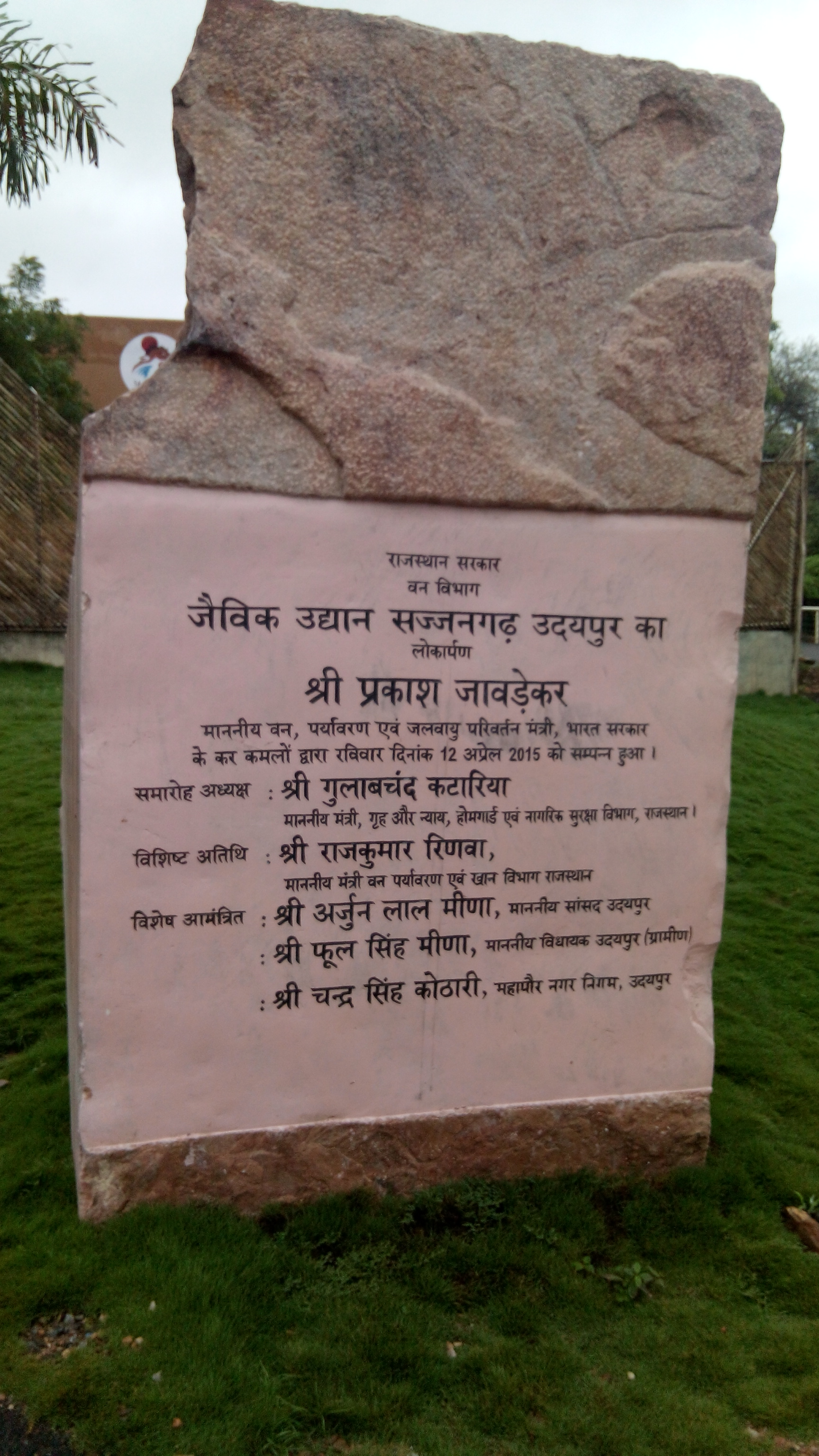
- Sajjangarh Biological Park Foundation Stone
- Interactive map of Sajjangarh Biological Park
- 24.5931841°N 73.6497259°E
- Date opened: 12 April 2015
- Location: Udaipur, Rajasthan, India
- Land area: 36 hectares
- Website: http://www.sajjangarhbiologicalpark.in

Sajjangarh Biological Park is a zoological garden located in Udaipur, Rajasthan, India. This biological park is situated just beneath the Monsoon Palace (also known as Sajjangarh Palace), around 4 km from the city center.

== History ==
Construction of this park started off in 2004-05 under the Rajasthan Forestry and Biodiversity Project, with financial assistance of Japan International Co-operation Agency. The park is developed over an area of 36 hectares, with a budget of 21.70 crore rupees. This park was an outcome of the fact that existing zoo Gulab Bagh failed to facilitate the norms prescribed norms by the Central Zoo Authority, New Delhi. During its construction, the civil construction works are being executed by the Rajasthan State Road Development and Construction Corporation Ltd., while service road was built by the Public Works Department. The forestry related works are being done by the Forest Department. The park was inaugurated on 12 April 2015 by Prakash Javdekar, an Indian Minister holding portfolios of Environment and Forests. The park launched India's First Augmented Reality Application and their mascot in association with Panther Studio Pvt Ltd to promote wildlife tourism and education about local flora and fauna. The application was launched on 29 May 2019 by Dr. C. P. Joshi is an Indian politician holding position of Speaker of the Rajasthan Legislative Assembly.

== Attractions ==
The zoo has different varieties of animals and birds which have been brought from different parts of world. At present, it houses 60 animals of 21 species including tigers, panthers, lions, ostriches, alligators, rhesus monkeys etc. Within two months of its inauguration, the park has received more than 46,000 visitors in a month, generating a revenue of Rs 14 lakh for the forest department, which is a record in itself. Biopark's mascot is one of the most engaging attraction of biopark. Visitors can click selfies with the mascot by scanning Sajjangarh logo using Sajjangarh AR Application.

== In media ==
India's First, Udaipur’s Sajjangarh Biological Park taps in Augmented Reality app to attract visitors.
