= Kanor, Rajasthan =

Kanore Kanore
- Tehsil & Nagar Palika
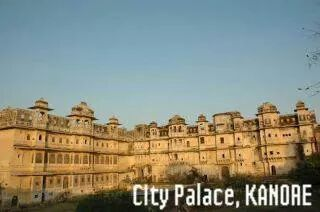
- Kanore Palace
- Nickname: City of Ponds
- Location in Rajasthan, India Kanore (India)
- Coordinates: 24.43°N 74.27°E
- Country: India
- State: Rajasthan
- District: Udaipur

Government
  - Body: Nagar Palika
- Elevation: 469 m (1,539 ft)

Population (2001)
  - Total: 12,616

Languages
  - Official: Hindi, Mewari
- Time zone: UTC+5:30 (IST)
- Postal code: 313604
- ISO 3166 code: RJ-IN
- Vehicle registration: RJ-27

Kanore is a town in Udaipur district in the Indian state of Rajasthan.

== Geography ==
Kanore is located at 24.43°N 74.27°E. It has an average elevation of 469 metres (1,539 ft).

== Demographics ==
As of 2001 India census, Kanor had a population of 12,616. Males constitute 54% of the population and females 46%. Kanor has 78% literacy for males and 54% for females, for an average literacy rate of 67%, which is higher than the national average of 59.5%. In Kanor, 12% of the population is under 6 years of age.
