= Saheliyon-ki-Bari =

Garden in Udaipur, India

Coordinates: 24°36′10″N 73°41′07″E

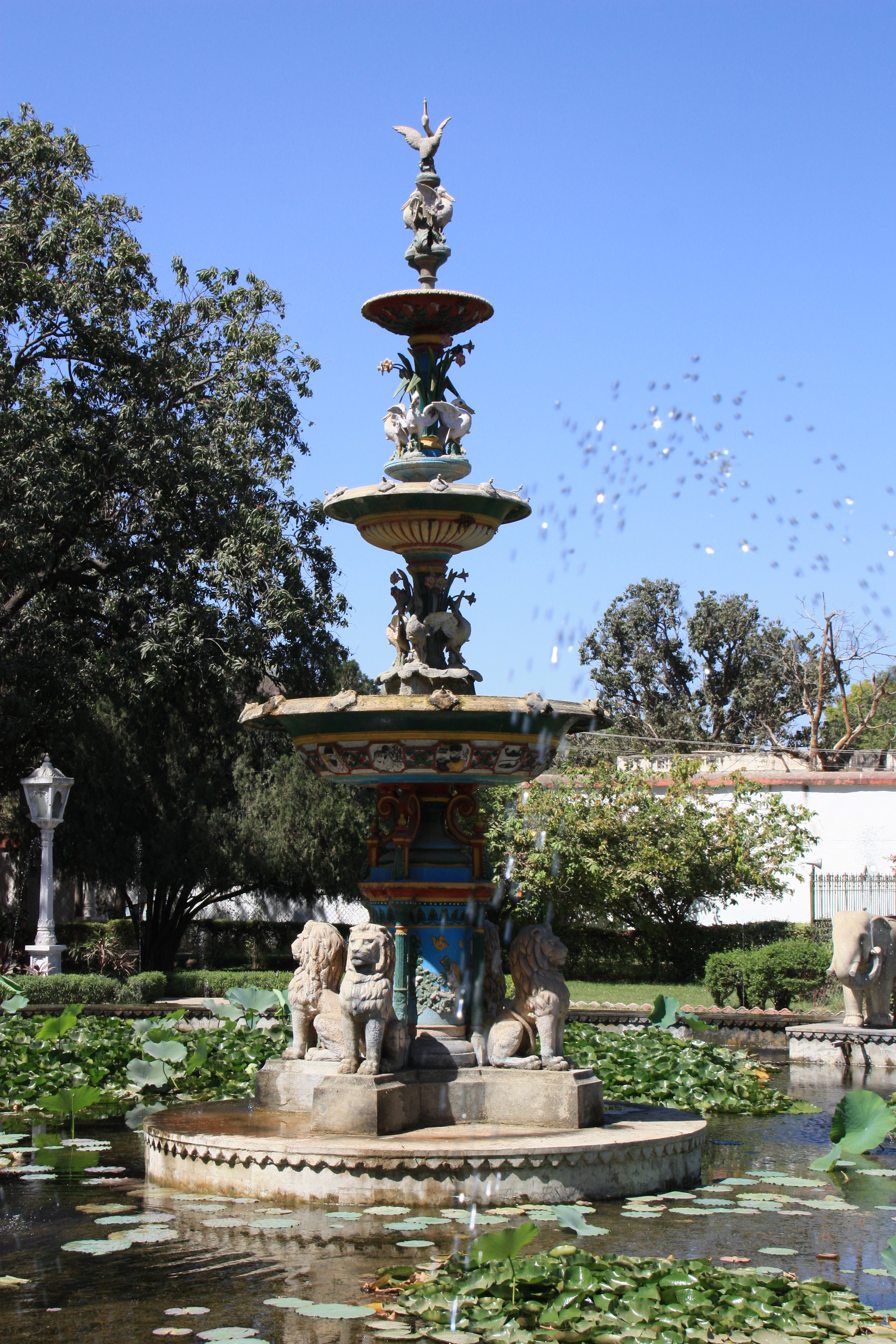
- Saheliyon-ki-Bari
- Interactive map of Saheliyon-ki-Bari
- Type: Garden
- Location: Near Fateh Sagar Lake
- Created: 1710–1734

Saheliyon-ki-Bari (Courtyard or Garden of the Maidens) is a major garden and a popular tourist space in Udaipur in the Indian state of Rajasthan. It lies in the northern part of the city and has fountains and kiosks, a lotus pool and marble elephants. It was built by Rana Sangram Singh. There is also a small museum here which has a lot of information about Indian history.

== History ==
Saheliyon Ki Bari was laid for a group of forty-eight maidens. This garden is located on the banks of the Fateh Sagar Lake, presenting a green retreat in the dry lands of Rajasthan. It was built from 1710 to 1734 by Maharana Sangram Singh for the royal ladies.

As per legend, the garden was designed by the king himself and he presented this garden to his queen. The queen was accompanied by 48 maids in her marriage. To offer all of them pleasurable moments away from the political intrigues of the court, this garden was made. This patterned garden used to be the popular relaxing spot of the royal ladies. The queen with her maids and female companions used to come here for a stroll and spend their time in leisure.

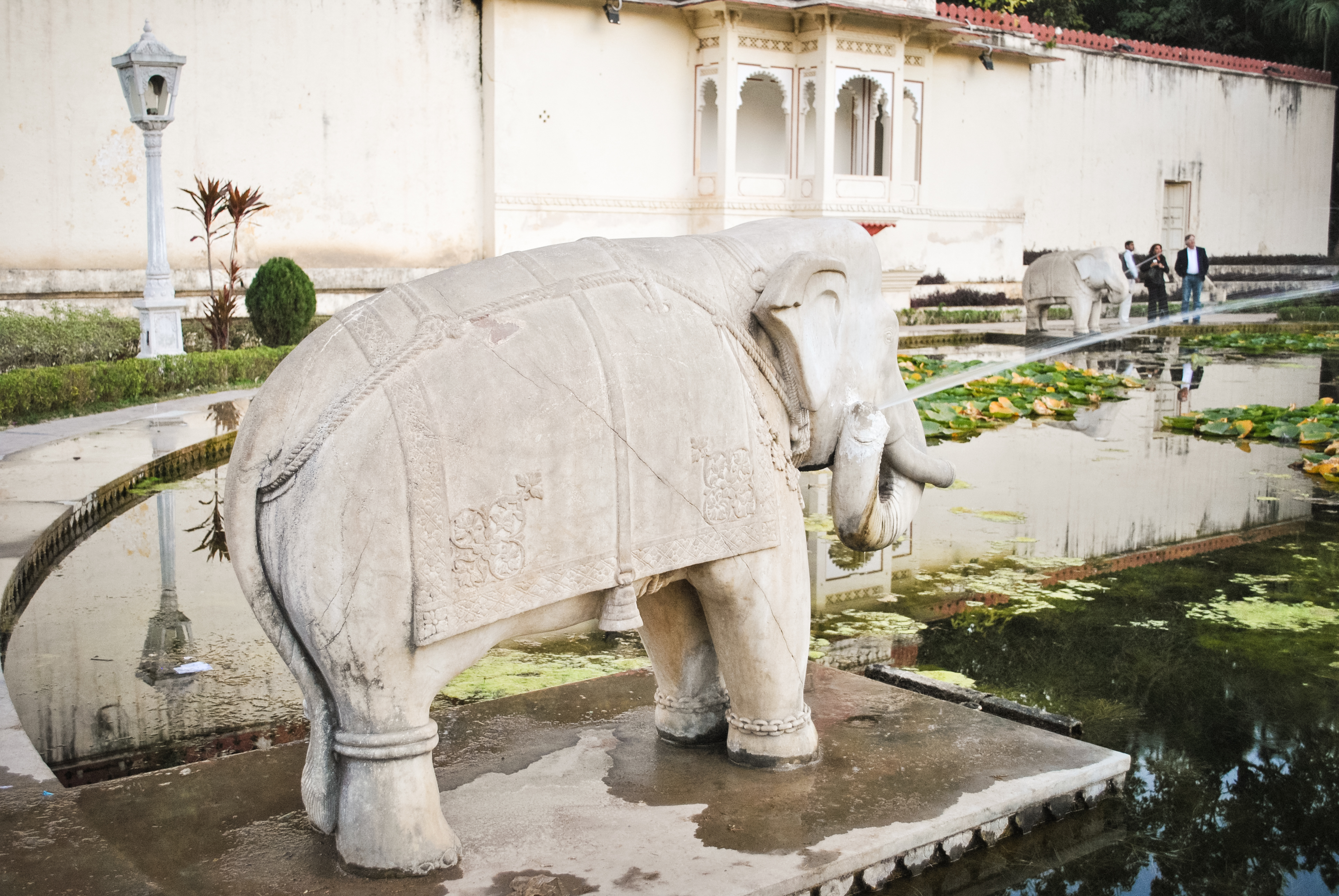
Elephant shaped fountain – Sahelion Ki Bari, Udaipur
