= Mewar family dispute =

Succession and property dispute in House of Mewar

The ongoing dispute within the House of Mewar concerns succession rights and property ownership in Udaipur, Rajasthan.

== Background ==
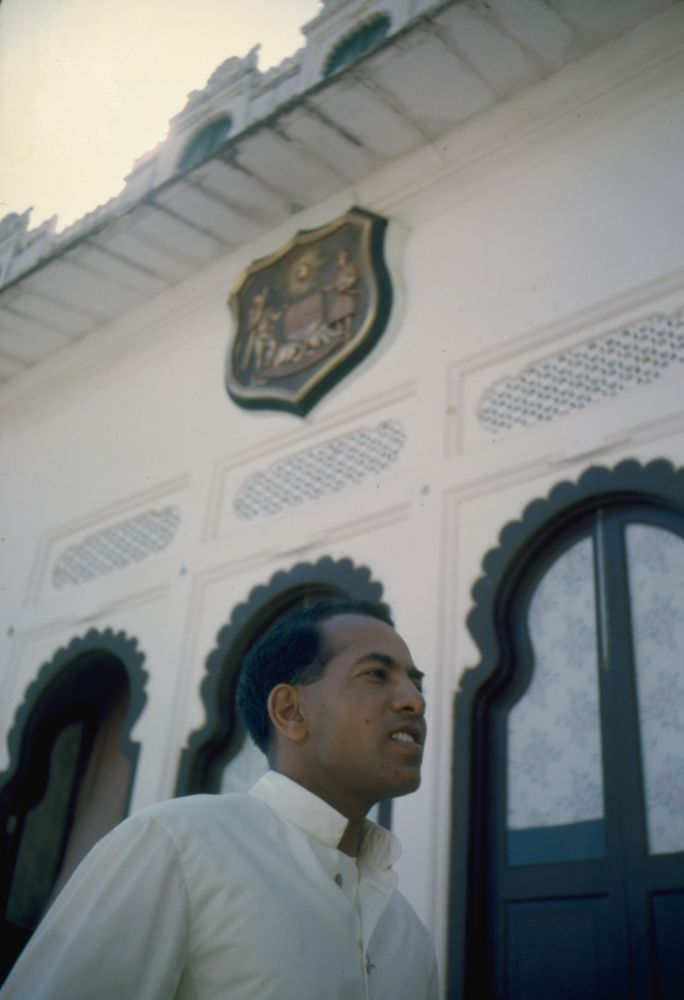
Bhagwat Singh Mewar

The Sisodia clan of Rajputs, to which the members of the House of Mewar belong, claims descent from Rama. Its head, the Maharana, formerly ruled Mewar as the Diwan of Eklingji. Eklingji is regarded as an incarnation of Shiva.

Bhupal Singh, the Maharana of Mewar, having no issue of his own, adopted Bhagwat Singh Mewar as his son and successor. Bhagwat Singh Mewar was married on 24 February 1940 to Sushila Kumari, a daughter of Sadul Singh, the Maharaja of Bikaner, by his wife Sudarshan Kumari, a princess of Rewa. They had three children: Mahendra Singh Mewar, Yogeshwari Kumari, and Arvind Singh Mewar. Upon Bhupal Singh’s death in 1955, Bhagwat Singh Mewar succeeded to his title, rank, and dignity. His succession was recognised by the Government of India. His adoptive father received a privy purse of Rs 2,500,000, along with an additional Rs 400,000 due to his physical disability. However, his own privy purse was reduced to Rs 10,00,000. Within five years, he converted the Jag Niwas Palace, his summer residence, into a heritage hotel named Lake Palace. In 1971, when Indira Gandhi abolished privy purses and princely privileges, Bhagwat Singh Mewar wrote to her: "I cannot accept being instrumental in the derogation of the institution to which I belong," and established the Maharana of Mewar Charitable Foundation (MMCF).

During Bhagwat Singh Mewar lifetime, his eldest son, Mahendra Singh Mewar, filed court cases against him. Mahendra Singh Mewar accused Bhagwat Singh Mewar of wasteful expenditure and asked for division of the property. In a fit of anger, Bhagwat Singh Mewar disinherited Mahendra Singh Mewar. At the same time, Bhagwat Singh Mewar gave the responsibility of managing the family’s properties to his younger son, Arvind Singh Mewar. In 1984, Bhagwat Singh Mewar, in his final will and testament, bequeathed his entire property to his son, Arvind Singh Mewar, through a trust. He included Yogeshwari Kumari as a trustee in it. He excluded his eldest son, Mahendra Singh Mewar, on the grounds that he was incapable of managing the family legacy. He excluded his first wife, Sushila Kumari, from the will and named Annabella Parker, his second wife, as a beneficiary.

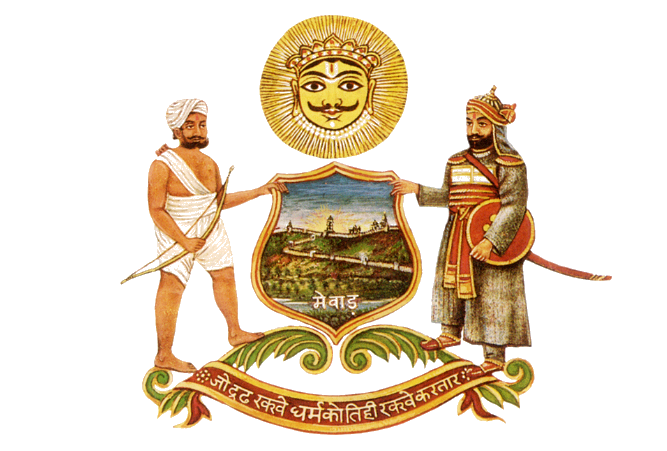
CoA of Mewar

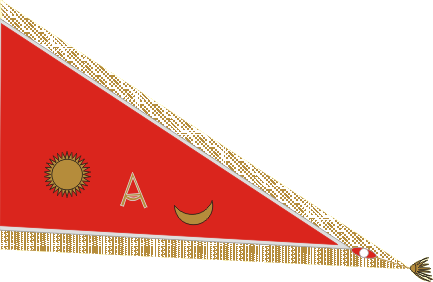
Flag of Mewar

== Developments ==
Following the death of Bhagwat Singh Mewar in 1984, Arvind Singh Mewar, his younger son, assumed the headship of the House of Mewar with the title of Shriji Hazur, in accordance with his father's will. However, at the same time, his eldest son, Mahendra Singh Mewar, was crowned Maharana of Mewar at Tripolia inside the City Palace by the Rawat of Salumber.

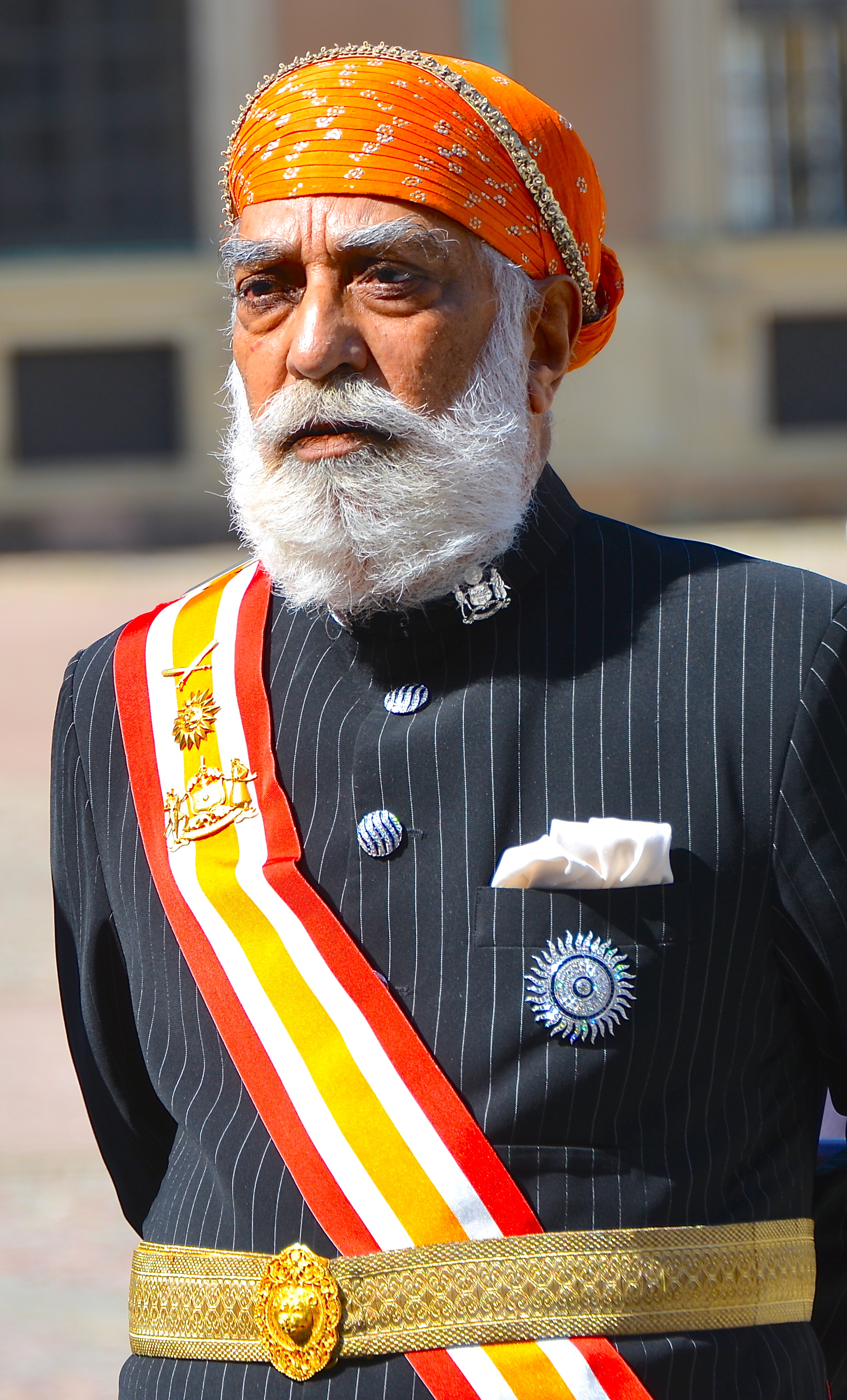
Arvind Singh Mewar

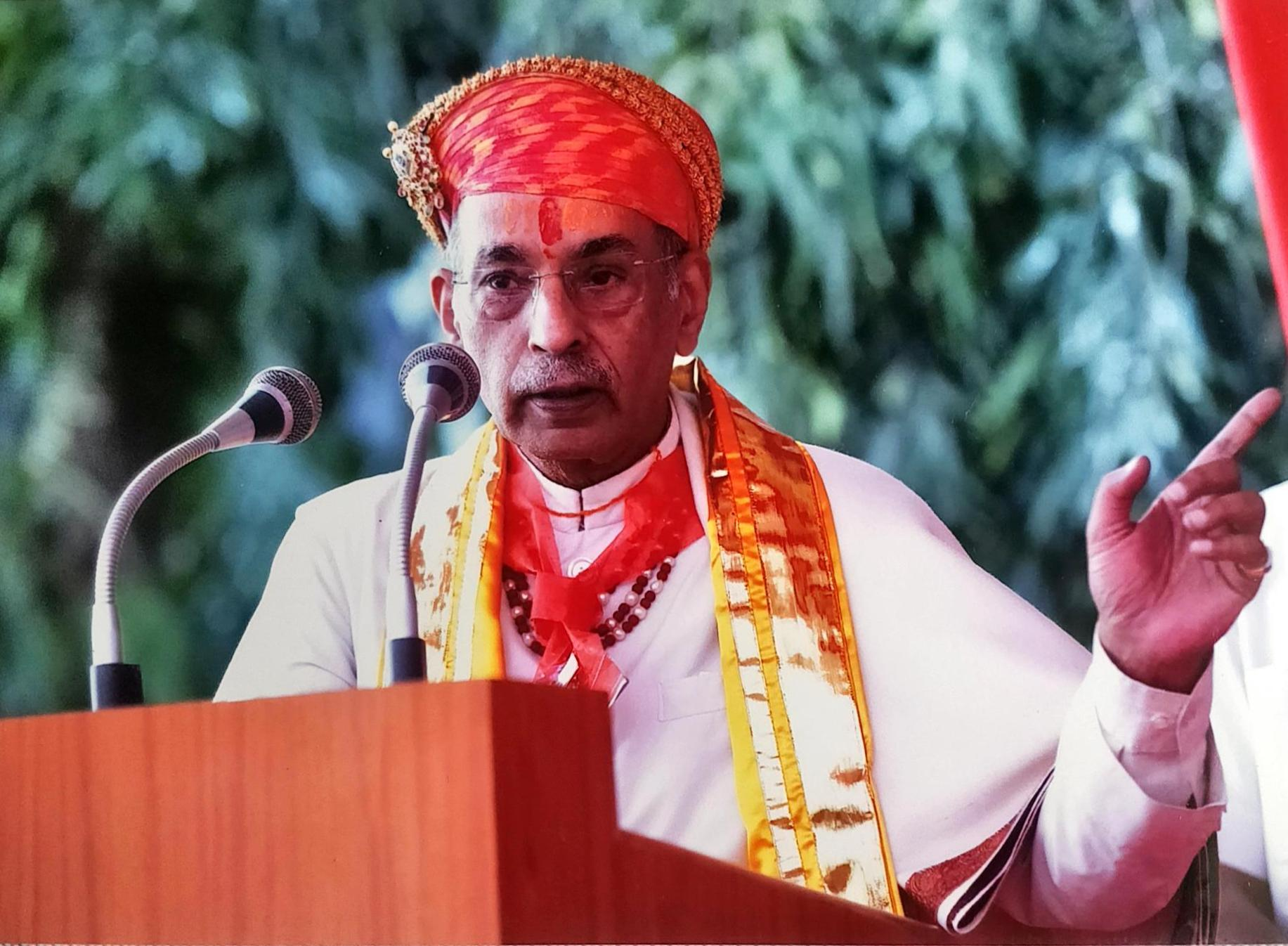
Mahendra Singh Mewar

Mahendra Singh Mewar died on 10 November 2024. Following this, on 25 November 2024, his son, Vishvaraj Singh Mewar, was installed as the Maharana of Mewar at the Fateh Prakash Palace within Chittorgarh Fort. The Rawat of Salumber, Devrat Singh, performed his tilak using blood drawn from his thumb. He then proceeded to the City Palace to seek darshan of the Dhuni there, but was refused entry. Earlier that day, his uncle, Arvind Singh Mewar, had published public notices warning of legal action against trespassing. A large number of police officers were deployed to prevent any untoward incidents. The streets surrounding the City Palace were cleared of tourists, and the shops had closed their shutters. His supporters attempted to cross the police barricades but were unsuccessful. Vishvaraj Singh Mewar himself waited for several hours at Jagdish Chowk. The local authorities then intervened and held separate talks with him and his cousin, Lakshyaraj Singh Mewar, in an attempt to prevent the situation from escalating further. However, the talks proved unproductive. That night, both parties threw stones at each other. After this, the local authorities took possession of the part of the City Palace where Vishvaraj Singh Mewar was to seek darshan and escorted him there to complete the ritual. This was 48 hours after he was crowned. After this, he paid his respects to Eklingji and departed for his residence the Samore Bagh.

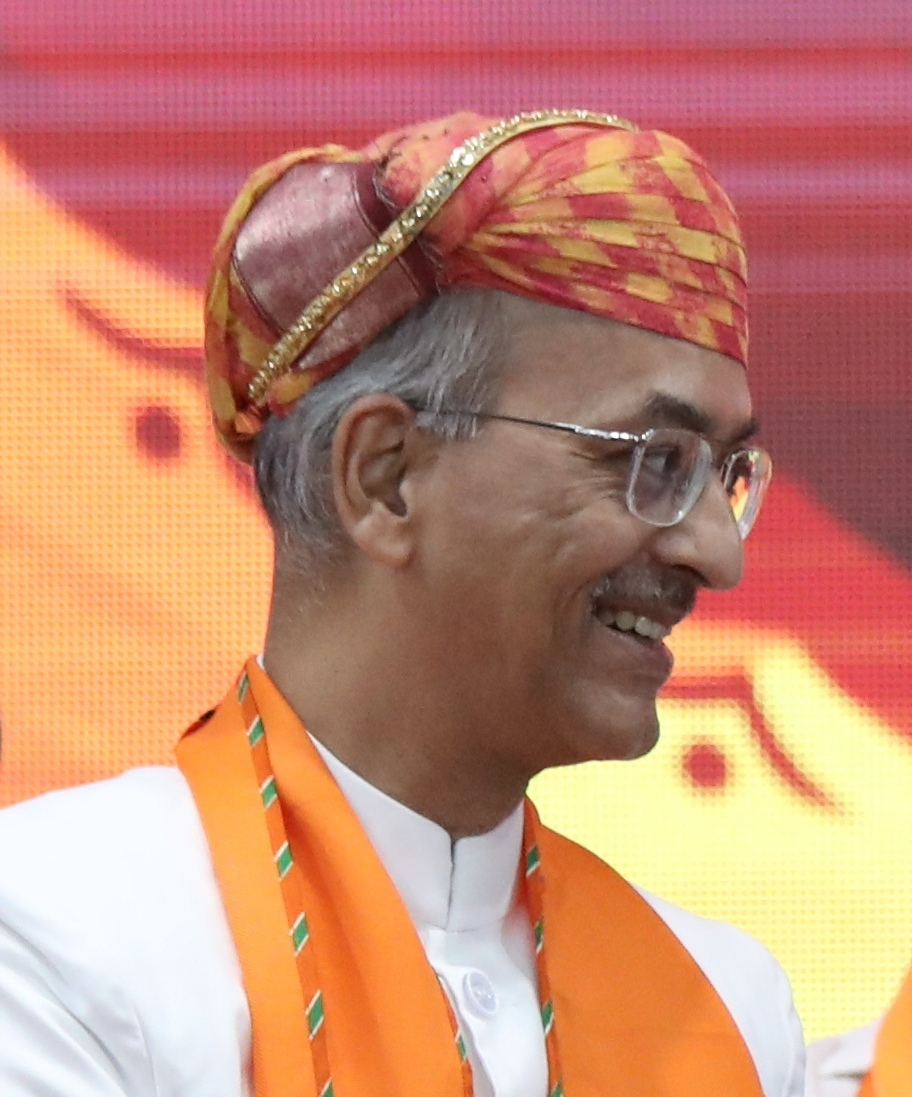
Vishvaraj Singh Mewar

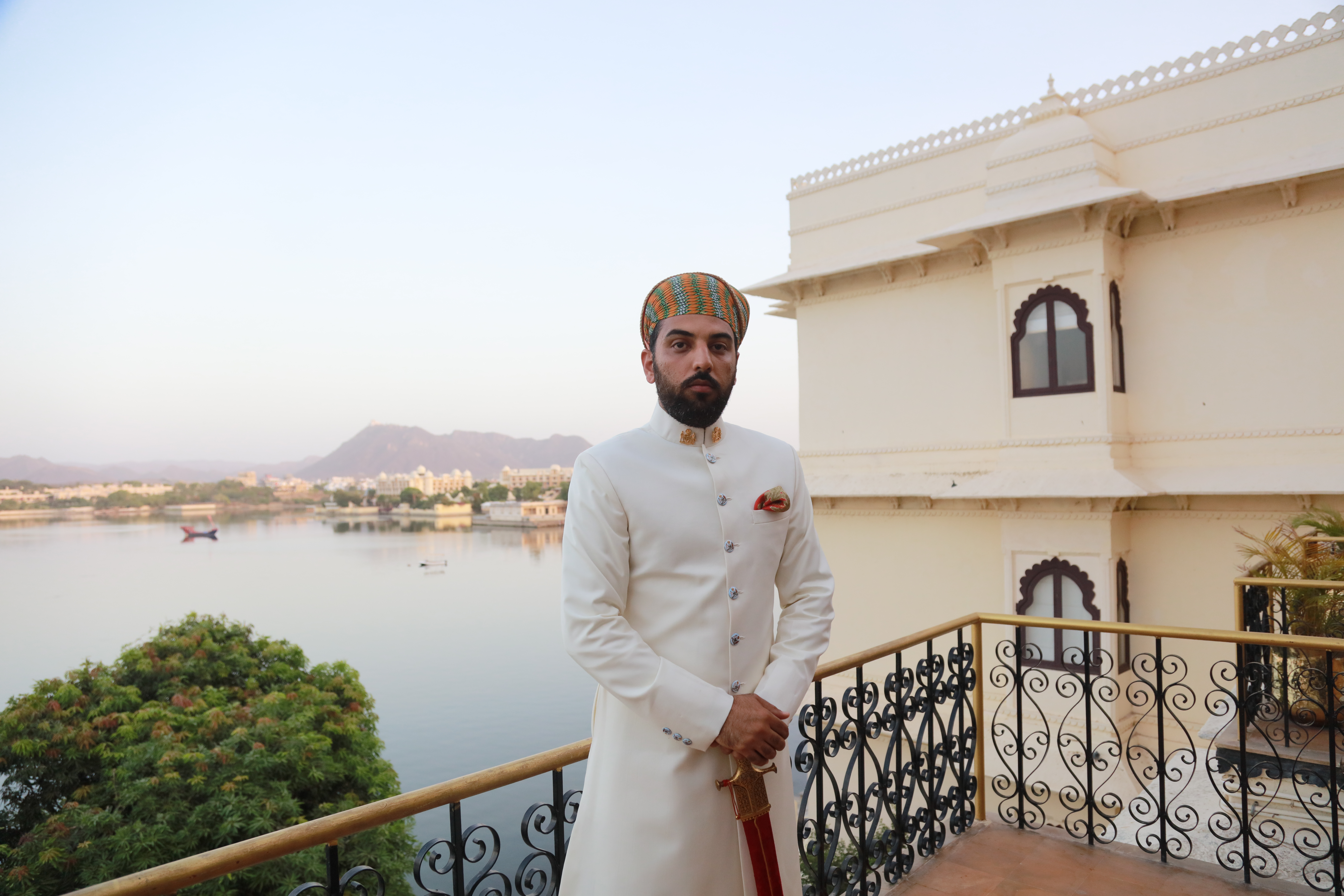
Lakshyaraj Singh Mewar

Arvind Singh Mewar died on 16 March 2025. On account of his death, the City Palace was closed until after his funeral. His funeral rites were performed by his son, Lakshyaraj Singh Mewar, on 17 March 2025 at Mahasati. A few days after his father's demise, on 2 April 2025, Lakshyaraj Singh Mewar held his Gaddi Utsav (transl. coronation ceremony) and Rang ka Dastur (transl. ceremony of changing the turban to a colored one).

A dispute arose between Lakshyaraj and his sister, Padmaja Kumari Parmar, following their father’s death regarding the rights to the City Palace, HRH Group of Hotels, and other properties that were self-acquired by Arvind Singh Mewar. In this matter, Lakshyaraj wanted the proceedings to be held in the Rajasthan High Court, while Padmaja preferred them to be held in the Bombay High Court. Supreme Court of India intervened and ordered that all these cases between the two be transferred to the Delhi High Court, where they will be heard on 11 January 2026.

== Legal status ==
The legal proceedings concerning the Mewar family's assets have continued for decades. In 2020, the Udaipur District Court issued a ruling that divided key properties, namely Shambhu Niwas Palace, Badi Pal, and Ghas Ghar, equally among the three children of Bhagwat Singh Mewar. A fourth share was retained under his name. The court further declared that the three children would be permitted to use the properties on a rotational basis. However, Arvind Singh Mewar appealed the decision at the Rajasthan High Court, which subsequently stayed the district court's order and maintained the status quo until a final verdict is reached. Lakshyaraj Singh Mewar has been looking after the properties following his father’s death and functions as the managing trustee of the Maharana of Mewar Charitable Foundation.
