= Lakshyaraj Singh Mewar =

Custodian of the House of Mewar and Indian businessman

- Maharana
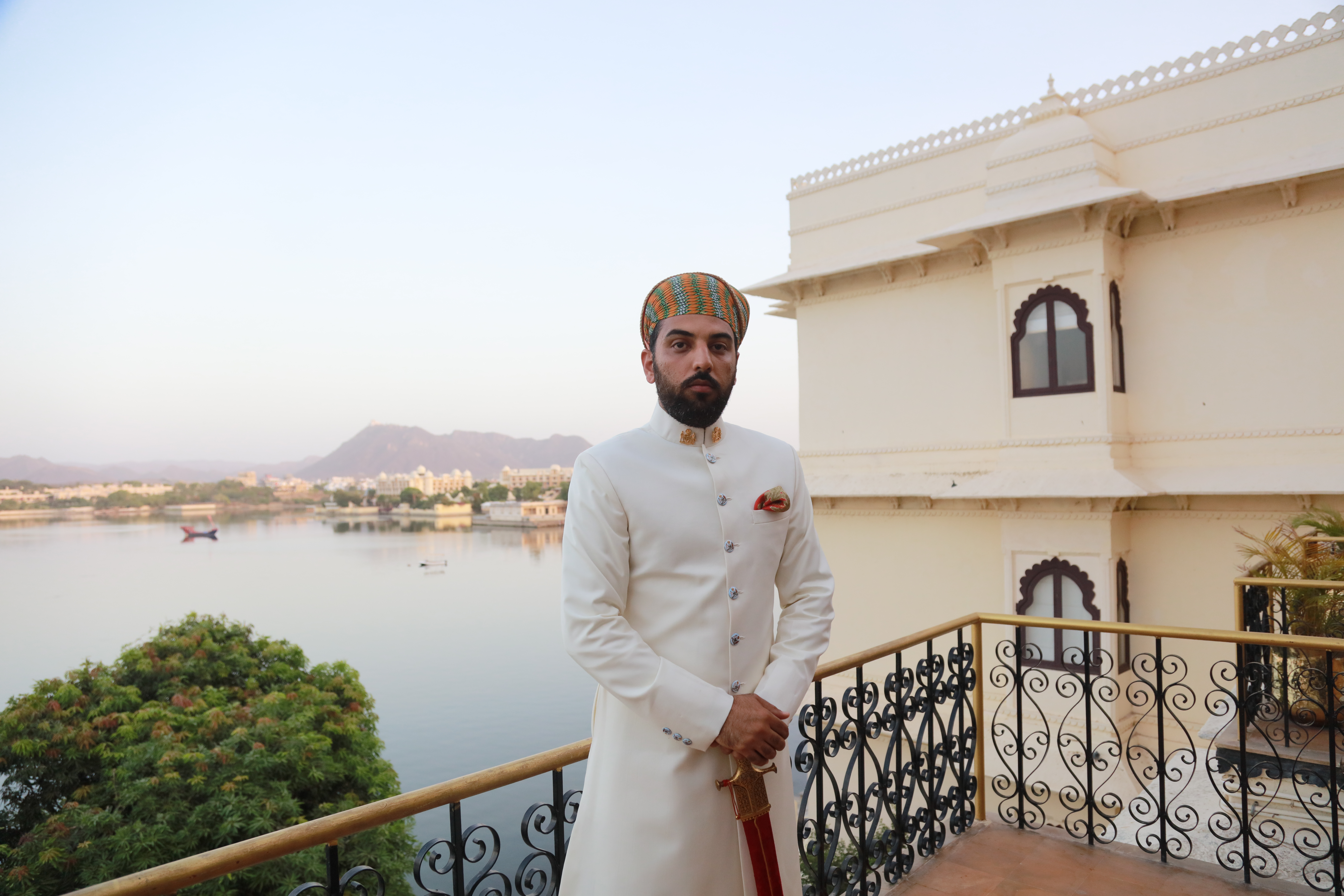
- Lakshyaraj in 2016

Head of the House of Mewar (disputed)
- Tenure: 16 March 2025–present
- Coronation: 2 April 2025
- Predecessor: Arvind Singh Mewar
- Heir apparent: Haritraj Singh Mewar
- Born: 28 January 1985 (age 41)
- Spouse: Nivritti Kumari
- Issue: Mohlakshika Kumari Mewar; Praneshwari Kumari Mewar; Haritraj Singh Mewar
- Dynasty: Sisodia
- Father: Arvind Singh Mewar
- Mother: Vijayraj Kumari Mewar

Public and Government Roles
- Tourism Advisor to Governor of Rajasthan: 2022–present
- Board Member of NCHMCT: October 2026–present

Organization(s)
- HRH Group of Hotels; Maharana of Mewar Charitable Foundation

Official Website
- lakshyarajsinghmewar.com

Lakshyaraj Singh Mewar (born 28 January 1985) is an Indian aristocrat, businessman, and the disputed Head of the House of Mewar. In April 2026, Mewar hosted the United States Ambassador to India, Sergio Gor, at the Udaipur City Palace to discuss the cultural heritage, tourism development, and history of the Mewar region. He also hosted a four-nation diplomatic delegation at the City Palace, welcoming Ambassador Mariano Caucino of Argentina, Ambassador Victor Echeverri of Colombia, Ambassador Antonio Bartoli of Italy, and Ambassador Javier Paulinich of Peru.

== Early life, family, and education ==
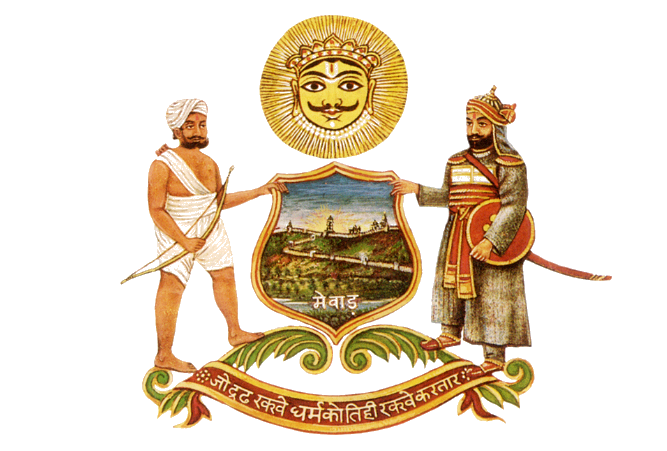
Princely arms of the Princes of Mewar (Udaipur).

Mewar was born to Arvind Singh Mewar and his wife Vijayraj Kumari Mewar. He is an agnatic grandson of Maharana Bhagwat Singh Mewar. His mother is the granddaughter of Vijayarajaji, the Maharao of Kutch.

He was educated at the Mayo College, Ajmer. He attended Blue Mountains International Hotel Management School in Australia, where he graduated with a BCom. Later, he studied management at the Nanyang Institute of Hospitality Management in Singapore.

He is married to Nivritti Kumari, the daughter of politicians Kanak Vardhan Singh Deo and Sangeeta Kumari Singh Deo. Nivritti is also the great-granddaughter of Rajendra Narayan Singh Deo, former Chief Minister of Odisha. Mewar and Nivritti have three children: Mohlakshika Kumari Mewar, Praneshwari Kumari Mewar, and Haritraj Singh Mewar.

== Career ==
He works as the executive director of HRH Group of Hotels. He also looks after the day-to-day affairs of Maharana Mewar Public School and Maharana Mewar Vidya Mandir.

In May 2026, he was a featured panelist for the India Week London to discuss India's growing role as a soft power alongside the need to preserve its culture and heritage.

== Overseas engagements ==
=== Involvement with the Australian Football (AFL) ===
Mewar, and sprinter Usain Bolt are honorary members of Richmond Football Club, based in Melbourne, Australia.

During his Australia visit in June 2017, Mewar was made the number-one ticket holder of Richmond Football Club (Richmond Tigers). He is the first, and only Indian male, to be bestowed with such an honour in the AFL.

Mewar was presented with honorary membership of Tigers at the Melbourne Cricket Ground (MCG), in presence of former Victorian premier Hon.Ted Baillieu.

He was also given an official tour of the MCG, including its fully operational central Kitchen during a live match.

=== Victorian Business Ambassador program ===
In May 2018, the main opposition political coalition of Victoria, Australia - the Liberal Nationals proposed to nominate Mewar as a "Victorian Business Ambassador". The Victorian Business Ambassador program enlists well known and connected business leaders to assist in promoting Victoria’s trade and investment overseas.

== Succession ==
Following the death of his father, Arvind Singh Mewar, on 16 March 2025, the City Palace, Udaipur, announced that his Gaddi Utsav (transl. coronation ceremony) as the 77th Maharana of the now-defunct Kingdom of Mewar, along with the Rang ka Dastur (transl. ceremony of changing the turban to a colored one), would be held on 2 April 2025. The Maharana is the head of the Sisodia clan of Rajputs and holds the highest rank among all Rajput princes. The Maharana is also regarded as the Diwan or hereditary high priest of Shree Eklingji, the tutelary deity of the House of Mewar. The Maharana is sometimes addressed as Shriji or Bapji, meaning "honorable" or "sire/father," respectively.

Mewar's Gaddi Utsav was held on 2 April 2025 at the Rai Angan courtyard of the City Palace in Udaipur. A havan was performed during the event. His father-in-law, Kanak Vardhan Singh Deo, and Shailesh Lodha, along with other dignitaries, attended the event. Vagishkumar Goswami, the head priest of the Mewar royal family, applied tilak to Mewar’s forehead after the completion of Gaddi Puja (transl. worship of throne). He then offered flowers to the image of Eklingji. Afterward, he sought the darshan of Dhuni. He then performed the religious rites of the Ashwa Puja (transl. worship of horse). He then visited the Eklingji Temple in Kailashpuri. In the evening, he performed the worship of Hathi Pol at City Palace, Udaipur, followed by the ceremonial Rang Palatai (transl. change of mourning colors). He then visited Jagdish Temple in the evening.

=== Dispute ===
Following the demise of his grandfather, Bhagwat Singh Mewar, in 1984, both his father and uncle, Mahendra Singh Mewar, claimed to be custodians of the House of Mewar. After his uncle's death, his cousin, Vishvaraj Singh Mewar, was declared the 77th Maharana of Mewar by all the Sardars and Umraos at Fateh Prakash Palace, Chittorgarh Fort, on 25 November 2024. The title, which he and his cousin claim, is merely symbolic and serves as a means of carrying forward the family legacy. The 26th Amendment to the Constitution of India abolished the official recognition of titles, privileges, and special rights previously granted to the rulers of former princely states.

== Philanthropy and records ==
He has set nine Guinness World Records till now.

On 2 November 2023, he sponsored the full tuition fees for all the girls at Government Girls' Senior Secondary School, Udaipur, for the academic year 2023-2024.

== Brand ambassador ==
On 15 February 2024, the Indian Hotels Company Limited, known as Taj Hotels Group, announced that Mewar has been appointed its brand ambassador.

On 2 April 2024 the Arvind Mills, announced that Mewar has been appointed brand ambassador for Primante, its premium suiting and shirting brand.

== Honors and awards ==
=== Honorary degree ===
| Country | Date | School | Degree | References |
|---|---|---|---|---|
| India | 20 December 2022 | Mohanlal Sukhadia University | Doctor of Literature (D. Lit.) | |
| India | 1 February 2025 | Ajeenkya DY Patil University | Doctor of Letters (D. Lit.) | |

=== Awards ===
- July 2019: Received the 7th Bharat Gaurav Award at the House of Commons of the United Kingdom.
- August 2026: Received the Grand Cross of Order of Rana Raghubir (GCRR)
