= Arvind Singh Mewar =

Indian royal and businessman (1944–2025)

- Maharana; Shriji Hazur
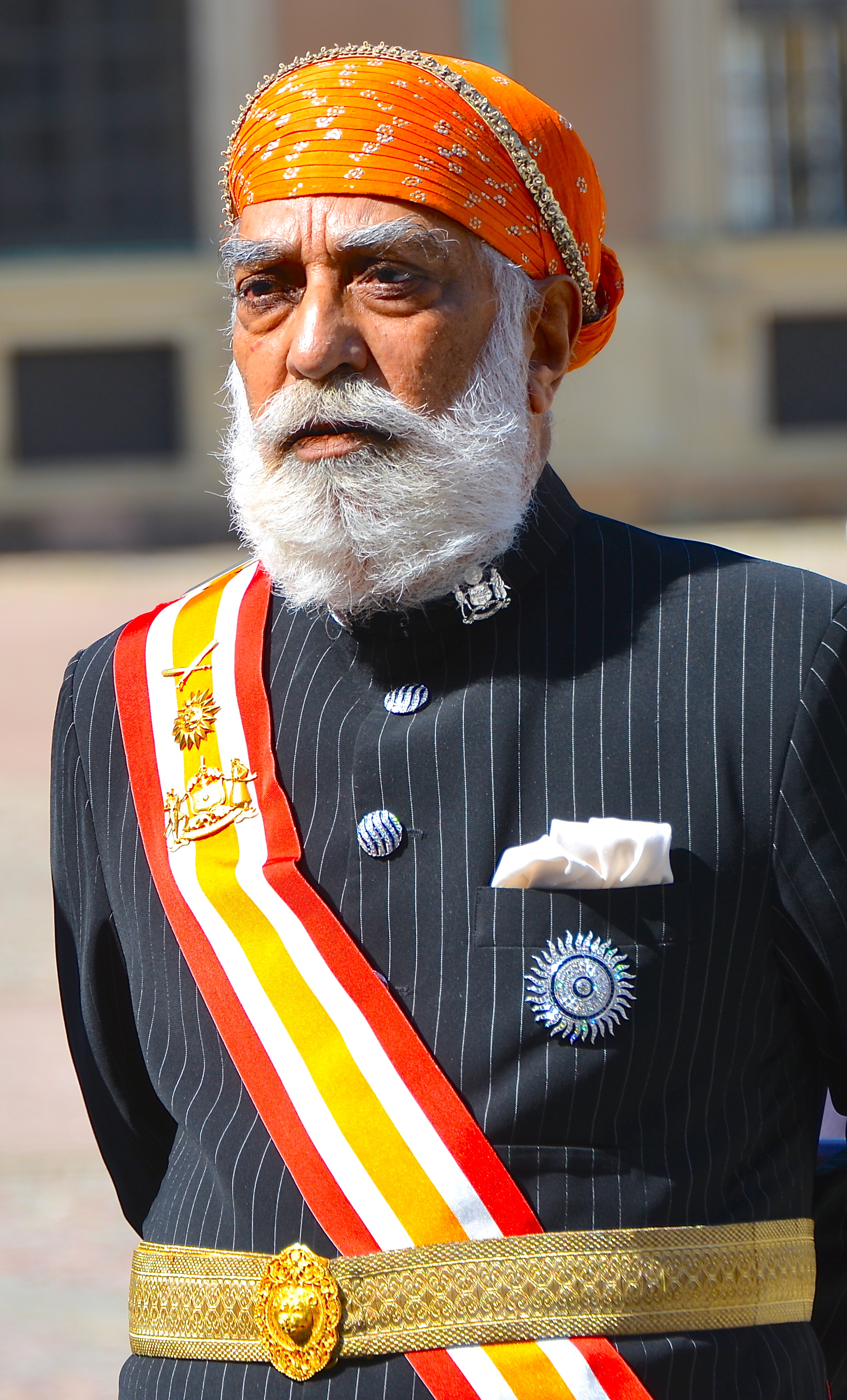
- Mewar in 2013

Head of the House of Mewar (disputed)
- Tenure: 3 November 1984 – 16 March 2025
- Predecessor: Bhagwat Singh Mewar
- Successor: Lakshyaraj Singh Mewar
- Born: 13 December 1944; Udaipur, Udaipur State, British India (present-day Rajasthan, India)
- Died: 16 March 2025 (aged 80); Udaipur, Rajasthan, India
- Spouse: Vijayraj Kumari Mewar
- Issue: Lakshyaraj Singh Mewar; Bhargavi Kumari Mewar; Padmaja Kumari Mewar
- Dynasty: Sisodia
- Father: Bhagwat Singh Mewar
- Mother: Princess Sushila Kumari of Bikaner
- Organization(s): HRH Group of Hotels; Maharana of Mewar Charitable Foundation
- Website: www.arvindsinghmewar.com

Arvind Singh Mewar (Note: Hindi pronunciation: [ʌɾʋɪndᵊ sɪɳɣʰ meʋäːɽ]) (13 December 1944 – 16 March 2025) was an Indian aristocrat and businessman who was the chairman of HRH Group of Hotels. He was also the disputed Head of the House of Mewar.

== Early life and education ==
Mewar was born on 13 December 1944 to Bhagwat Singh Mewar and his wife, Shushila Kumari, as their second son. Singh received his primary education at home. In 1957, he was sent to Mayo College, Ajmer, where he passed his Senior Cambridge in 1961. Afterward, he studied at Maharana Bhupal College, Udaipur, until 1965. He obtained his BA there after studying subjects like English literature, economics, and political science. Then, he went to the UK and US to study hotel management. In the UK, he studied a course in hotel management at Metropolitan College, St Albans. After completing the course, he moved in 1967 to Chicago, US, where he did on-the-job training in hospitality services.

== Career ==
Arvind Singh Mewar was the chairman and managing director of the HRH Group of Hotels, which was started by his father in 1963. He had a crystal collection in the palace as well as a fleet of antique cars. These are open to the public.

From 1979 to 1981, Arvind Singh Mewar lived and worked in Chicago. Back in Udaipur, from 1981 to 1984, he worked as the personal secretary to his father, the former Maharana Bhagwat Singh Mewar. In 1982–83, he was General Manager of Lake Palace Hotel, Udaipur.

== Cricketing and polo career ==
Mewar played cricket in England. He joined Bramhall Cricket Club and later played as an opening batsman for the Lancashire 2nd XI. He then moved to Manchester to continue playing in the Lancashire League. On 15 December 1961, he made his Ranji Trophy debut for Rajasthan against Vidarbha in a match played at Bhopal Nobles' College ground. He established The Cricket Institute, Udaipur, to promote the sport across Rajasthan. Mewar was actively involved with several cricket associations, including the Rajasthan Cricket Association, the Cricket Club of India, the Bombay Cricket Association, and the Marylebone Cricket Club in London. He began playing polo in the 1970s but had to give up the sport for medical reasons. He later established the Udaipur Cup at the Cambridge and Newmarket Polo Club.

== Personal life ==
Mewar married Vijayraj Kumari in 1972. She is the daughter of Fateh Singh, the son of Vijayarajaji, the Maharao of Cutch. They had three children: two girls, Bhargavi Kumari and Padmaja Kumari, and one son, Lakshyaraj Singh Mewar. Lakshyaraj married Nivritti Kumari, who is the daughter of politicians Kanak Vardhan Singh Deo and Sangeeta Kumari Singh Deo. Nivritti is the great-granddaughter of Rajendra Narayan Singh Deo, former Chief Minister of Odisha.

== Death ==
Mewar remained in good health for most of his life, but his condition gradually declined in his final years. He was undergoing treatment at his residence, the City Palace in Udaipur. He died on 16 March 2025, at the age of 80.

His body was kept at Shambu Niwas for relatives, friends, and the public to pay their respects. The City Palace, Udaipur, was closed to tourists on 16–17 March due to his death. His funeral procession began around 11 a.m. on 17 March from Shambhu Niwas in City Palace, Udaipur. It passed through Badi Pol, Jagdish Chowk, Ghantaghar, Bada Bazaar, and Delhi Gate before reaching the cremation site at Mahasati in Udaipur, where his last rites were performed. His funeral pyre was lit by his son, Lakshyaraj Singh Mewar.

His nephew, Vishvaraj Singh Mewar, along with other dignitaries, attended his funeral.

== Controversies ==
Since the death of Bhagwat Singh Mewar, there have been conflicts and issues between his descendants regarding the leadership of the house of Mewar and a property dispute. It all started in 1984 when his father willed his entire property through a trust to Arvind, named him his successor, and disinherited his eldest son, Mahendra Singh Mewar, because he had filed a lawsuit against him. He made Arvind the executor of the will and his daughter, Yogeshwari Kumari, the trustee. This will was kept confidential, and no one knew of it until Bhagwat Singh Mewar's death, which led to questions about the will's legitimacy. After the death of his father, Arvind assumed the leadership of the house with the title of Shriji Hazoor, and his eldest brother Mahendra was crowned as the Maharana of Mewar by the Rawat of Salumber on 19 November 1984. The Maharanas were not considered rulers but mere custodians or diwans of Mewar on behalf of Sri Eklingji. In 2020, a court ruled that the estate shall be divided into four equal shares and allocated to Arvind, Mahendra, Yogeshwari and the deceased Maharana.

== See also ==
- Mewar
- Udaipur State
