= Vishvaraj Singh Mewar =

Maharana of Mewar and Politician

- Maharana
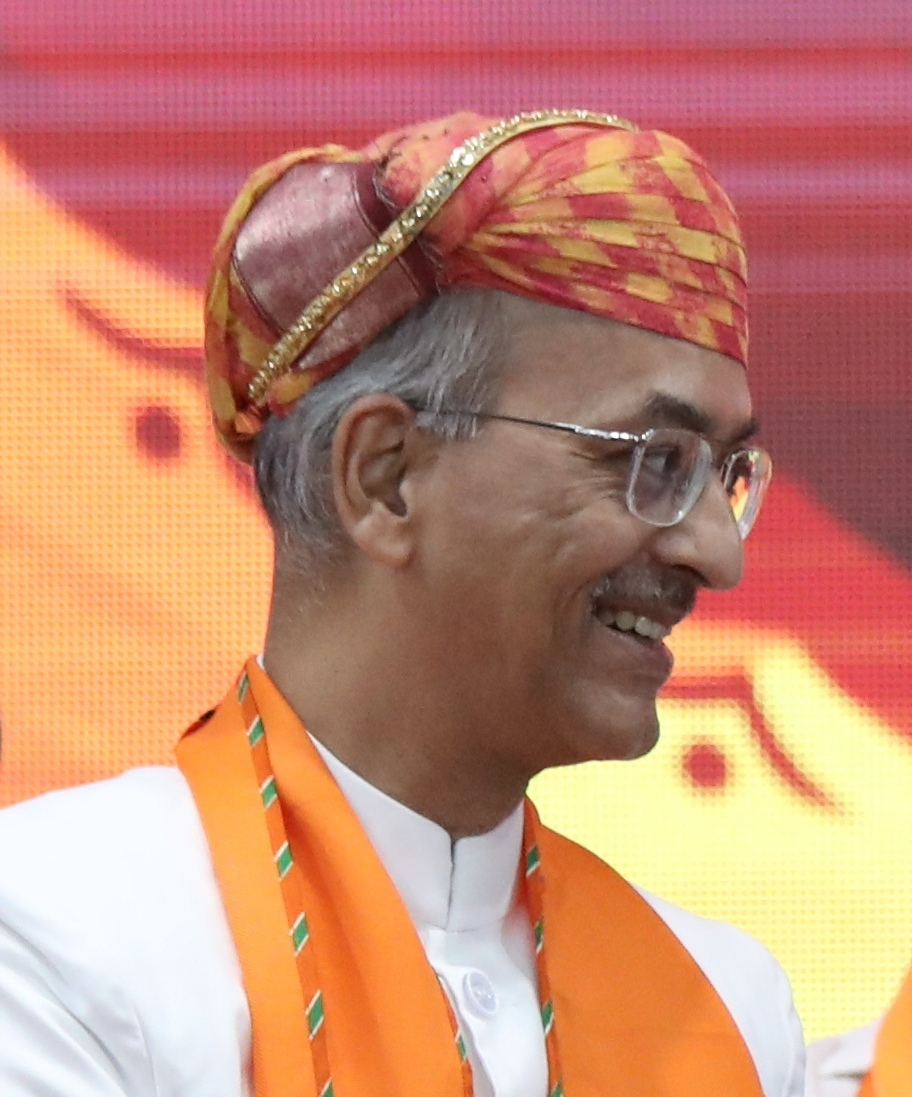
- Vishvaraj Singh

Head of the House of Mewar (disputed)
- Tenure: 10 November 2024–present
- Coronation: 25 November 2024
- Predecessor: Mahendra Singh Mewar
- Heir apparent: Devajaditya Singh Mewar
- Born: 18 May 1969 (age 57); Udaipur, Rajasthan, India
- Spouse: Mahima Kumari Mewar
- Issue: Prince Devajaditya Singh Mewar; Princess Jayati Kumari
- Dynasty: Sisodia
- Father: Mahendra Singh Mewar
- Mother: Maharani Nirupama Kumari, also Princess of Tehri Garhwal State

Member of the 16th Rajasthan Legislative Assembly
- Incumbent
- Assumed office 2023
- Preceded by: C. P. Joshi
- Constituency: Nathdwara

Personal details
- Party: Bharatiya Janata Party
- Relations: Manabendra Shah (maternal grandfather)
- Website: vishvarajsinghmewar.in

Vishvaraj Singh Mewar (born 18 May 1969) is an Indian aristocrat and politician who is a member of the Bharatiya Janata Party. He was elected as MLA from Nathdwara constituency and is the disputed Head of the House of Mewar.

== Personal life ==
He is married to Mahima Kumari Mewar, a royal family member and the daughter of Vidya Devi of Bandhi Talukdari (Madhya Pradesh) and Jagdishwari Prasad Singh Deo of Panchkote. She also supports him in canvassing. They have two children, one daughter named Baisa Jayati Kumari and a son named Devajaditya Singh.

== Political life ==
His father, Mahendra Singh Mewar, made his electoral debut with the Bharatiya Janata Party in the 1989 Lok Sabha elections. He later joined Indian National Congress, after which he lost the 1991 Lok Sabha elections in Chittorgarh and 1996 Lok Sabha elections in Bhilwara. His maternal grandfather Manabendra Shah, was an eight-time Member of Parliament from Tehri Garhwal and also a member of Bharatiya Janata Party.

He is the grandson of Bhagwat Singh of Mewar, the last Maharana of Mewar, and descendant of Rajput warrior Maharana Pratap. His father Mahendra and his uncle Arvind both are claiming to be 76th custodian of the House of Mewar. The matter is currently sub judice. The Royal Family of Udaipur (former Maharanas) were not direct rulers rather they were considered as custodians of the kingdom of Mewar on behalf of Eklingji (form of Shiva).

He defeated incumbent C.P. Joshi, five-term incumbent MLA and former Speaker of the Rajasthan Vidhan Sabha. He is an MLA from Nathdwara constituency in 16th Rajasthan Assembly. This is his electoral debut and re-entry of his family into Bharatiya Janata Party after 3 decades. His entry in Bharatiya Janata Party is attributed to Diya Kumari, Deputy Chief Minister of Rajasthan.

He had written to PM Narendra Modi and the CBFC in 2017 to stop the release of Bhansali's Padmaavat movie to prevent inaccurate portrayal of history and hurting of public sentiments. He had also written to the PM, S Jaishankar (Minister of External Affairs), and G Kishan Reddy (Minister for Tourism) with respect to the consent not being taken for their disputed property being used in G20 Summit.

== False Maratha map controversy ==
In 2025, Maharana Vishvaraj Singh Mewar Strongly Objected to an NCERT Map showing Mewar under Maratha rule and sought a correction. The disputed map appears in the Class 8 NCERT history textbook (Part-1, Unit-3, Page 71), showing the political divisions of India during a certain period. Singh said that sometimes Mewar is shown under British rule and at other times under Maratha control, which he described as not just historical ignorance but a deliberate distortion of history. He has written to the Ministry of Education and NCERT demanding an amendment to the concerned map.

== See also ==
- Kingdom of Mewar
- Mewar
