= HRH Group of Hotels =

Chain of heritage hotels based in India

- Company type: Private
- Industry: Hospitality
- Founded: 1986; 40 years ago
- Founder: Arvind Singh Mewar
- Headquarters: Udaipur, Rajasthan, India
- Number of locations: 10
- Area served: Udaipur; Bikaner; Ranakpur
- Key people: Lakshyaraj Singh Mewar (Chairman and MD)
- Services: Hotels and resorts
- Website: www.hrhhotels.com

HRH Group of Hotels, or Historic Resort Hotels Pvt. Ltd., is a chain of heritage hotels with its head office in Udaipur, Rajasthan, India.

== History ==
In 1959, Bhagwat Singh Mewar decided to convert Jag Niwas Palace into Udaipur's first luxury hotel, hoping it would attract tourists to Udaipur. He opened its gates in 1961. His son, Arvind Singh Mewar, established the HRH Group of Hotels in 1986, some fifteen years after the Government of India abolished privy purses and princely privileges. A total of five palaces in and around Udaipur were converted into hotels to form the group.

Arvind Singh Mewar served as chairman and managing director until his death in 2025, with Lakshyaraj Singh Mewar acting as executive director during that period. Lakshyaraj Singh Mewar now holds the position of chairman and managing director.

It is the only chain of heritage hotels and resorts under private ownership.

== Properties ==
The group currently manages 10 hotels and resorts with approximately 600 rooms across Rajasthan. Some of the properties they manage are:

- Shiv Niwas Palace, Udaipur
- Gajner Palace, Bikaner
- Jagmandir Island Palace, Udaipur
- Shikarbadi Hotel, Udaipur
- Garden Hotel, Udaipur
- Fateh Bagh, Ranakpur
- Karni Bhawan Palace, Bikaner

== Gallery ==
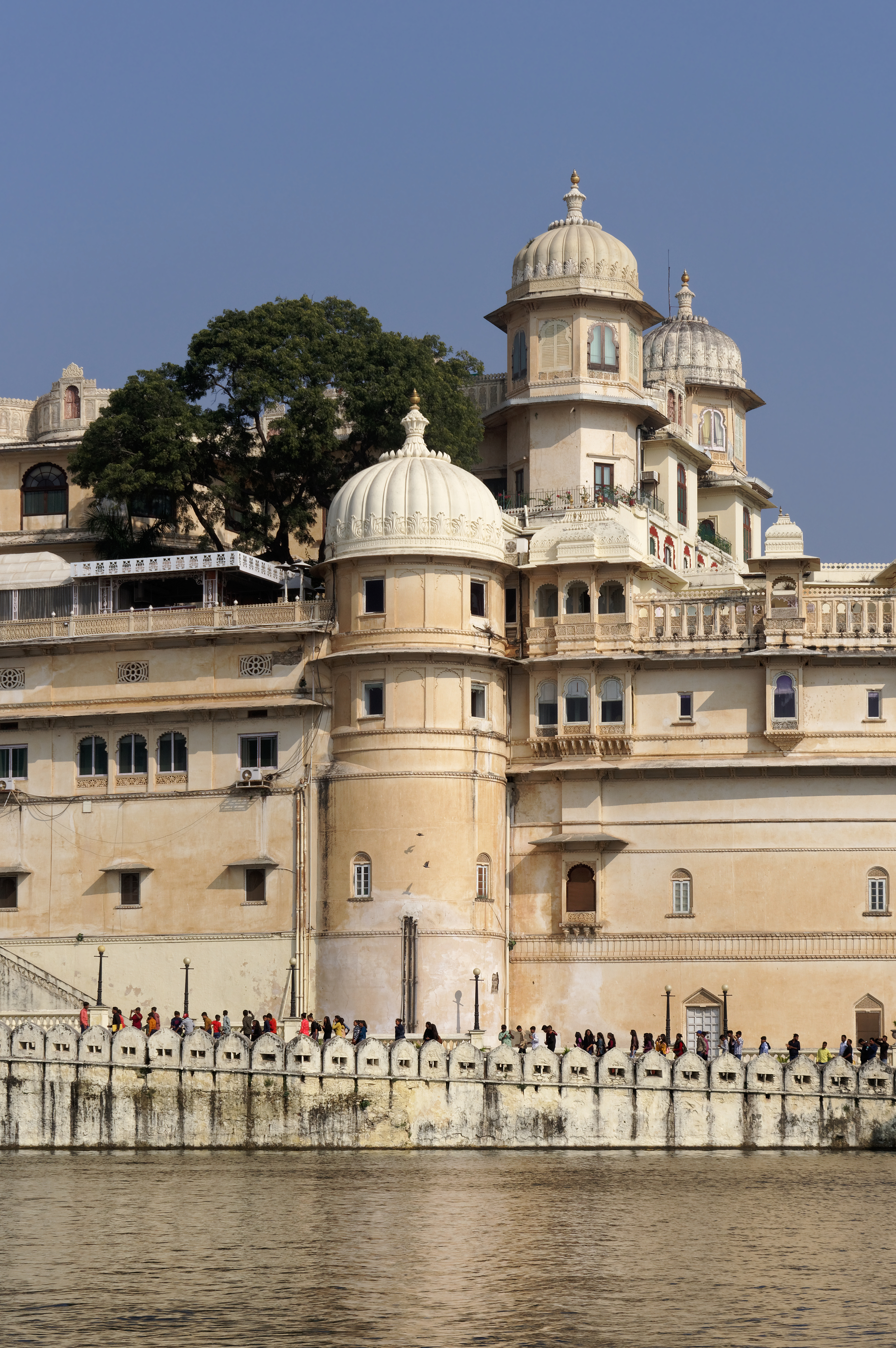
Shiv Niwas Palace, Udaipur

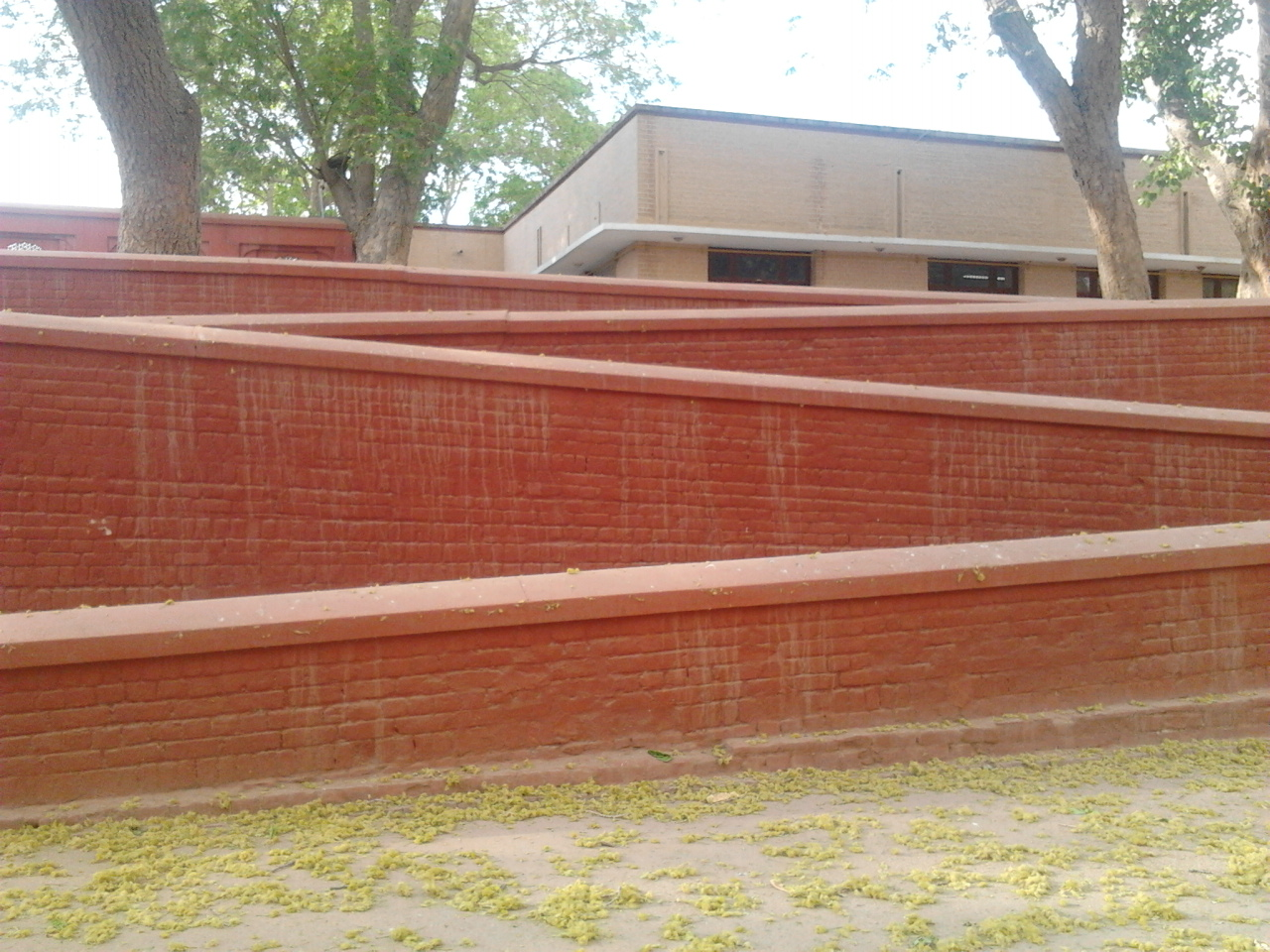
Staircase at Gajner Palace, Bikaner

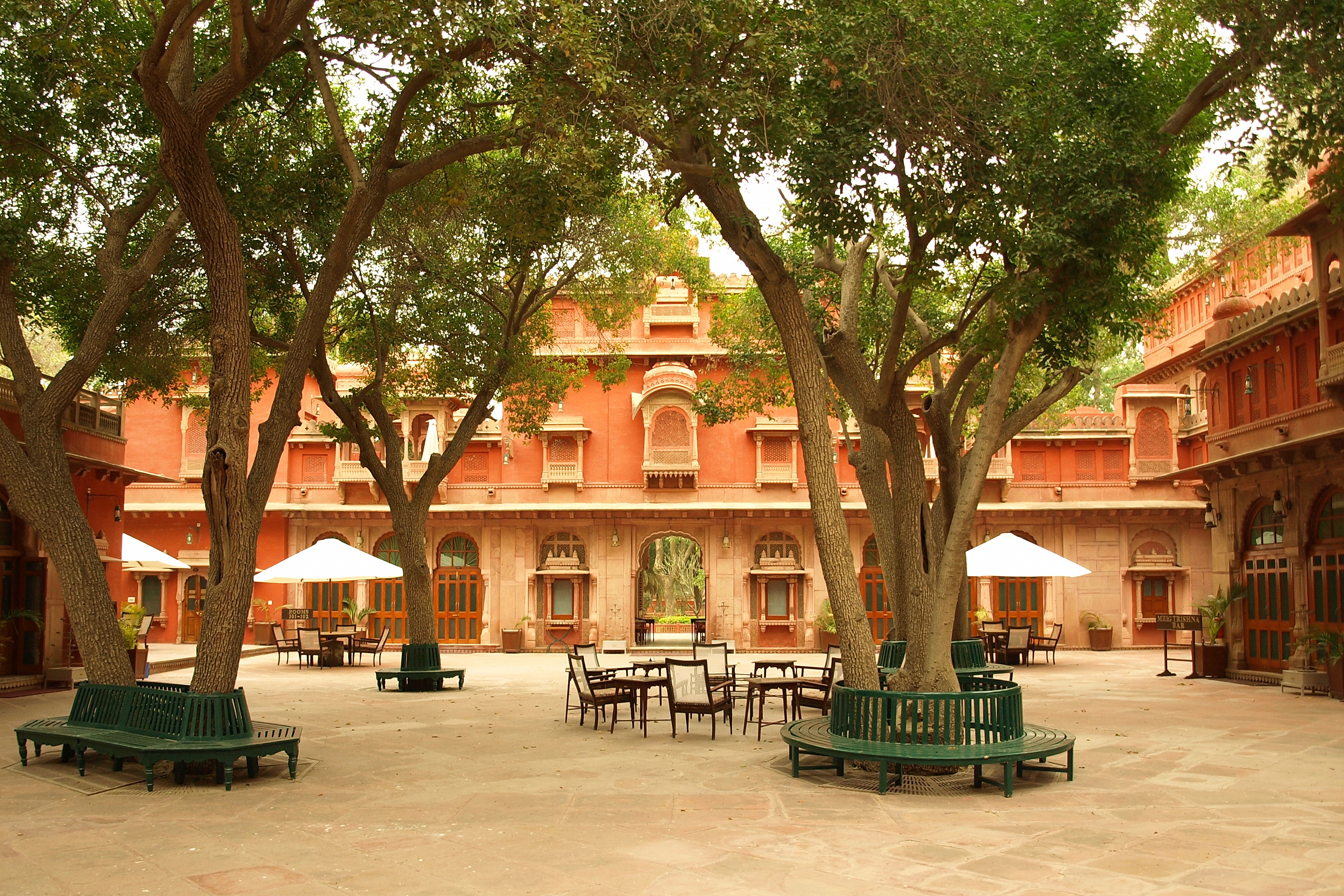
Gajner Palace, Bikaner

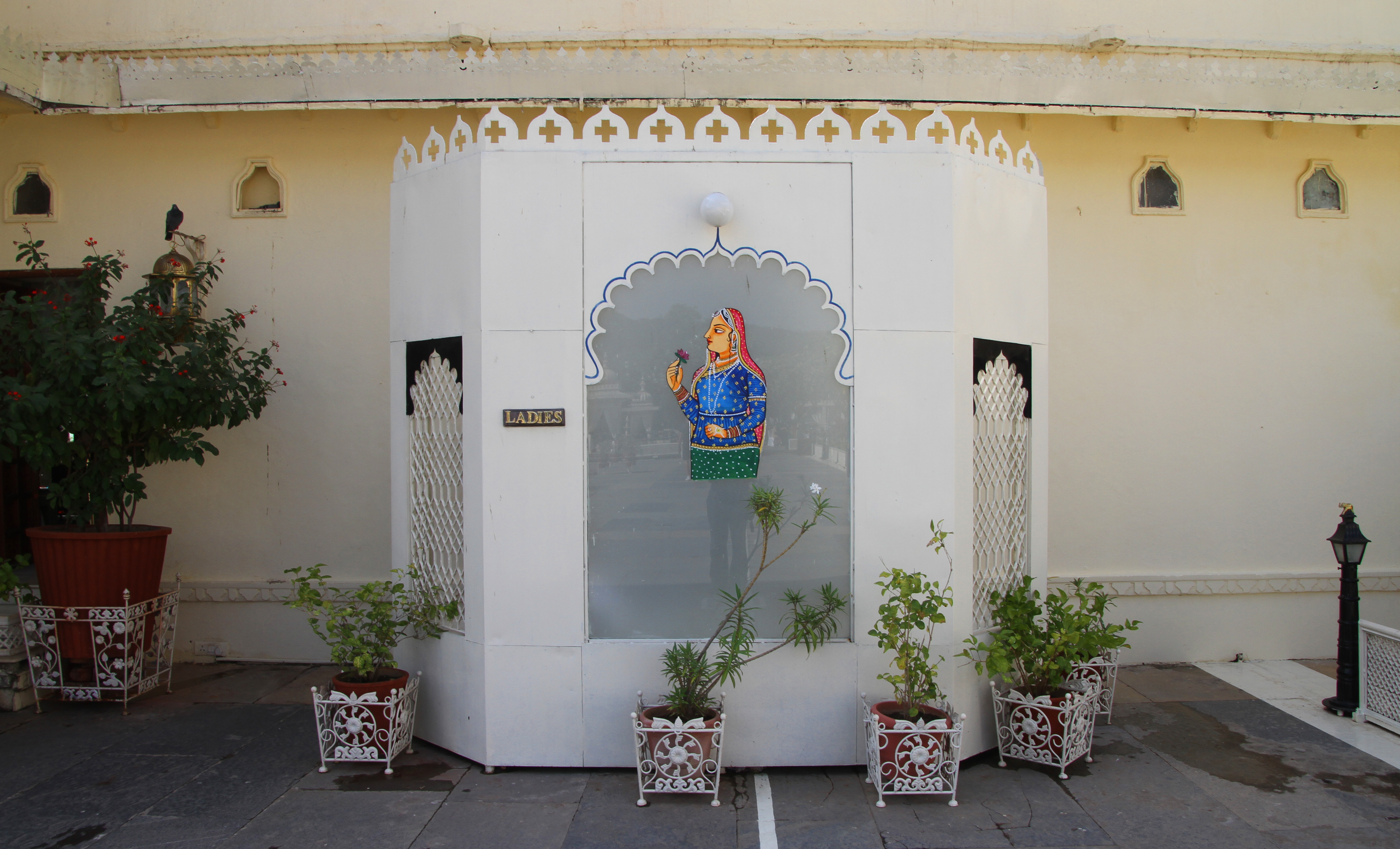
Jagmandir Island Palace, Udaipur

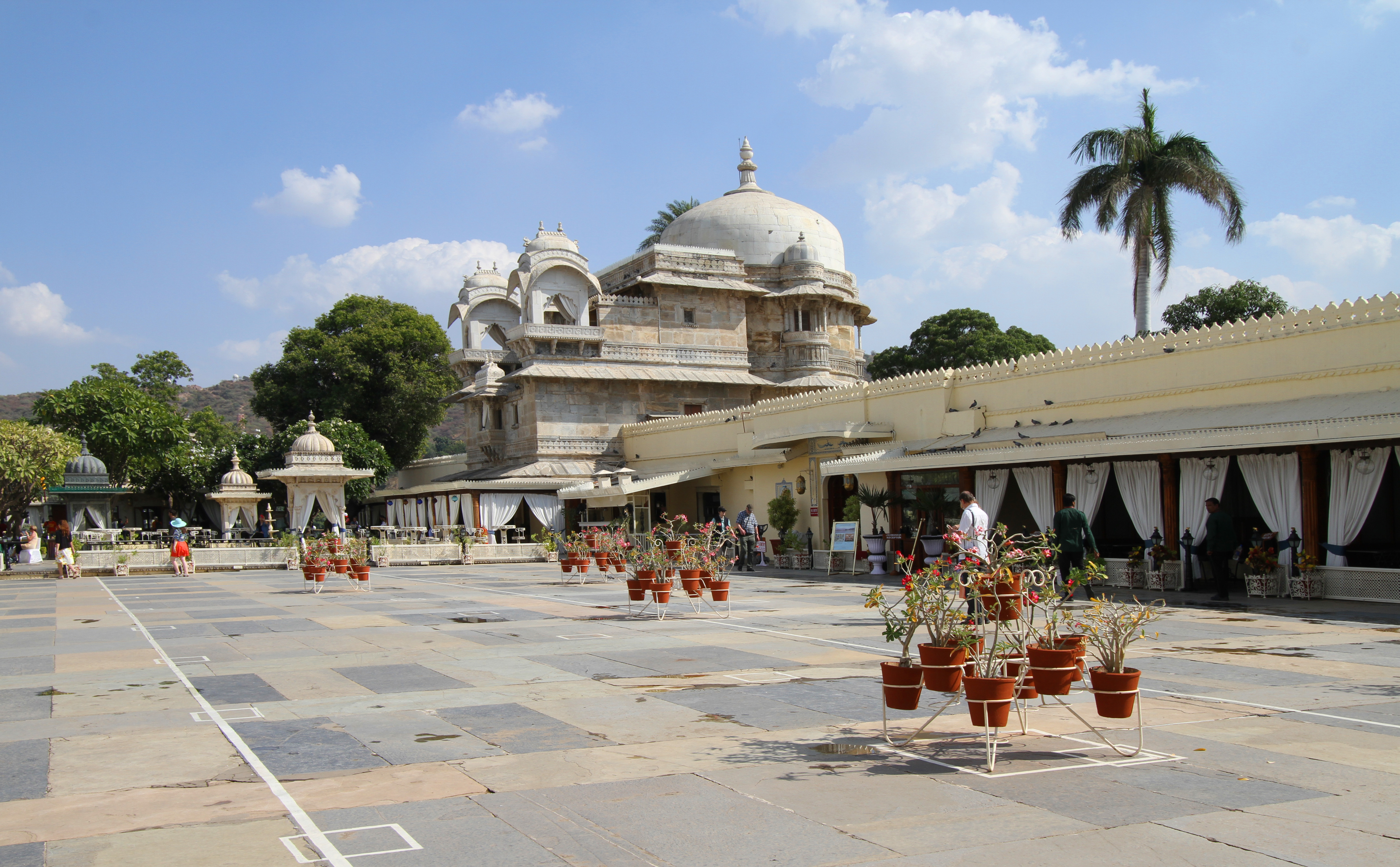
Jagmandir Island Palace, Udaipur
