= Maharana of Mewar Charitable Foundation =

Indian charitable trust

- The Maharana of Mewar Charitable Foundation (MMCF), Udaipur
- Abbreviation: MMCF
- Nickname: Eternal Mewar
- Formation: October 20, 1969; 56 years ago
- Founder: Bhagwat Singh Mewar
- Headquarters: City Palace, Udaipur
- Location: Udaipur, India
- Coordinates: 24.576°N 73.683°E
- Leader: Lakshyaraj Singh Mewar
- Website: https://www.eternalmewar.in/

Maharana of Mewar Charitable Foundation (also known as Eternal Mewar; commonly abbreviated MMCF) is a charitable trust.

== Background ==
Bhagwat Singh Mewar was a patron of numerous trusts throughout his lifetime. On 20 October 1969, he founded the MMCF by providing a substantial endowment and donating key sections of the City Palace in Udaipur for its establishment. In his will and testament of 1984, he reconstituted the institution of the Maharana for the MMCF, so that the office of Maharana shall continue in perpetuity. After his death, his son Arvind Singh Mewar was appointed Chairman and Managing Trustee of the MMCF. Following the death of Arvind Singh Mewar on 16 March 2025, his son, Lakshyaraj Singh Mewar, now functions as the Managing Trustee of the trust.

== Awards ==
Each year, the MMCF confers a series of awards for social service, scholarship, art, and economic initiative. These awards are traditionally presented to residents of Udaipur as well as to individuals from across India. They are named after figures who hold importance in the history of Mewar. These awards are:

Name	Instituted in	Notes
Colonel James Tod Award	1982-83	Named after James Tod. This award is presented to a foreign national who, like Tod, has contributed to a deeper understanding of the spirit and values of Mewar through work of lasting significance.
Haldighati Award	1986-87	Haldighati refers to the Battle of Haldighati. This award is presented to an individual whose work holds lasting value in awakening society, particularly through journalism or other forms of media.
Hakim Khan Sur Award	1996-97	Named after Hakim Khan Suri. This award honour work of permanent value for the cause of national integration.
Maharana Udai Singh Award	1997-98	Named after Udai Singh II. This award honors work that helps protect and improve the environment.
Panna Dhai Award	1980-81	
Maharishi Harit Rashi Award	1981-82	
Maharana Mewar Award	1980-81	
Maharana Kumbha Award	1983-84	
Maharana Sajjan Singh Award	1981-82	
Dagar Gharana Award	1986-87	
Rana Punja Award	1983-84	
Aravali Award	1983-84	
Best Police Station of Rajasthan	2007-08	
Bhamashah Award	1980-81	Named after Bhamashah. This award honors students who achieve the highest percentage and top position among all universities in Rajasthan.
Maharana Raj Singh Award	1980-81	
Maharana Fateh Singh Award	1996-97	
Maharana Arvind Singh Mewar Award	2025-26	Named after Arvind Singh Mewar.

== Recipients ==
Date	Venue	Award Name	Recipient(s)	Reference(s)
15 March 2026	City Palace, Udaipur	Colonel James Tod Award	Molly Emma Aitken	
15 March 2026	City Palace, Udaipur	Haldighati Award	Kamlesh Kishore Singh	
15 March 2026	City Palace, Udaipur	Hakim Khan Sur Award	Rizwan Malik	
15 March 2026	City Palace, Udaipur	Maharana Udai Singh Award	Marimuthu Yoganathan	
15 March 2026	City Palace, Udaipur	Panna Dhai Award	Crew of Jet Airways flight 9W 569	
15 March 2026	City Palace, Udaipur	Maharana Arvind Singh Mewar Award	Puneet Chhatwal	
15 March 2026	City Palace, Udaipur	Maharishi Harit Rashi Award	Vedamurti Devavrat Mahesh Rekhe	
15 March 2026	City Palace, Udaipur	Maharana Mewar Award	K. Prithika Yashini	
15 March 2026	City Palace, Udaipur	Maharana Mewar Award	Bhuvnesh Jain	
15 March 2026	City Palace, Udaipur	Maharana Mewar Special Award	Rajesh Vaishnav	
15 March 2026	City Palace, Udaipur	Maharana Kumbha Award	Tarun Kumar Dadhich	
15 March 2026	City Palace, Udaipur	Maharana Sajjan Singh Award	Ajay Rawat	
15 March 2026	City Palace, Udaipur	Dagar Gharana Award	Hariprasad Chaurasia	
15 March 2026	City Palace, Udaipur	Rana Punja Award	Dimple Chandat	
15 March 2026	City Palace, Udaipur	Aravali Award	Ram Ratan Jat	
15 March 2026	City Palace, Udaipur	Aravali Award	Avani Lekhara	
15 March 2026	City Palace, Udaipur	Best Police Station of Rajasthan	Suratgarh City Police Station	

== Gallery ==
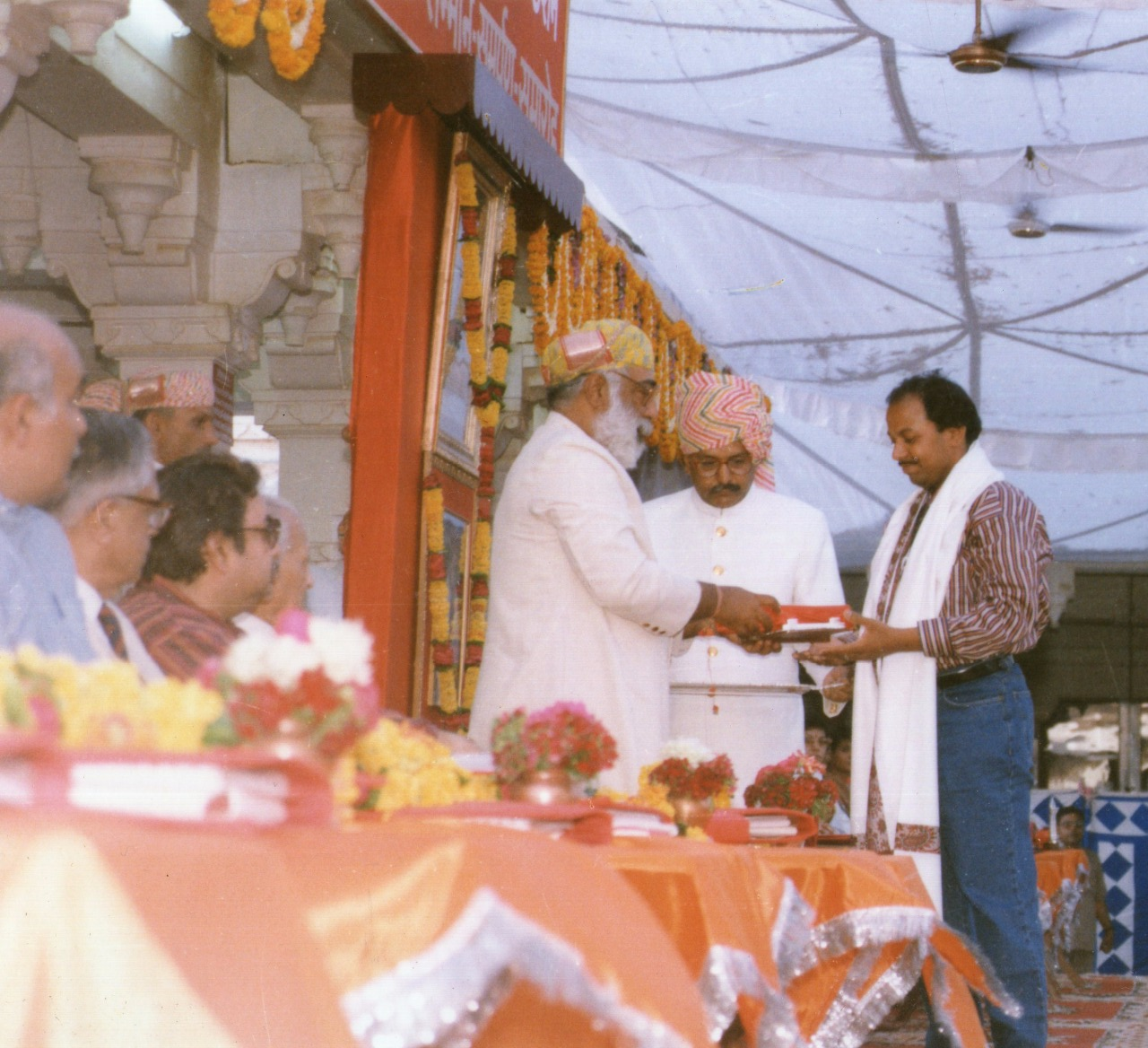
Arvind Singh Mewar presents the Maharana Sajjan Singh Award to Gopal Prasad Sharma.
