= List of ranas of Mewar =

Ranas/Maharanas of Mewar
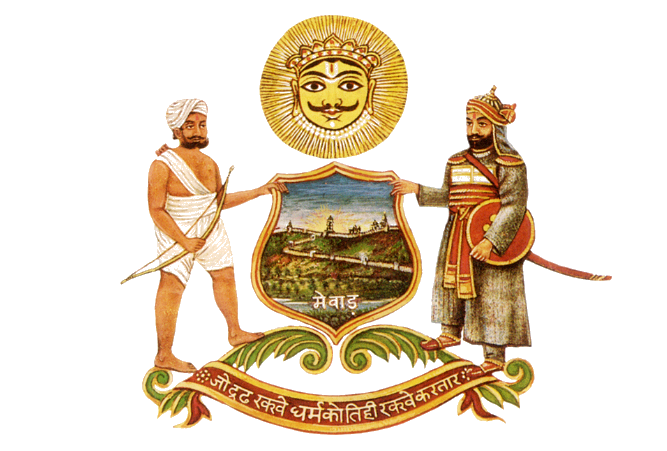

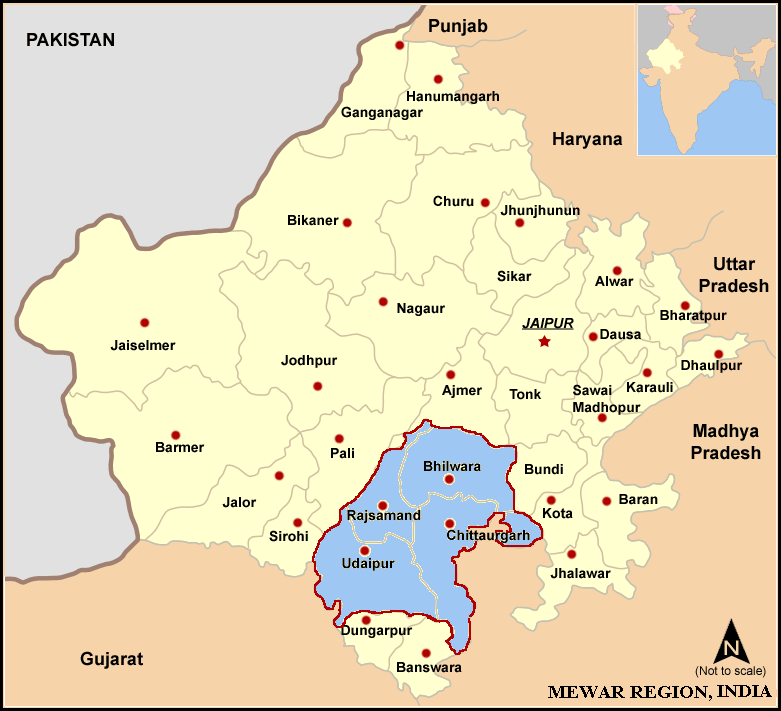
- Map of the Mewar Region
- Parent house: Guhila dynasty Sisodia dynasty
- Country: Kingdom of Mewar
- Founded: 1326
- Founder: Hammir Singh
- Current head: Disputed: Lakshyaraj Singh Mewar; Vishvaraj Singh Mewar
- Final ruler: Bhupal Singh
- Seat: Udaipur
- Historic seat: Chittorgarh
- Titles: Maharana, Rana
- Style: His Highness
- Motto: Jo drirha rakhe dharma koun tihin rakhe katar (The Almighty protects those who stand steadfast in upholding righteousness)
- Cadet branches: Sisodias of Pratapgarh; Chundawat; Shaktawat

The Sisodia clan of Mewar, also called the House of Mewar, is a Rajput clan founded in 1325-1326 that ruled the Kingdom of Mewar, later called Udaipur State under the British Raj, after their relatives of the Guhila dynasty were deposed during the 1303 Siege of Chittorgarh. The dynasty traces its ancestry back to Rahapa, a son of the Guhila king Ranasimha. Hammir Singh, a scion of this branch family of the Guhilas, re-established the Kingdom of Mewar after defeating the Tughluq sultans of Delhi.

== List of Maharanas of Mewar ==
Picture	Name	Reign	Notes
	Hammir Singh	1326–1364	He rebelled against the Tughlaqs in 1326 and recaptured Chittor from them, which was lost to Khijis in 1303. Defeated the Delhi Sultanate at Singoli. Captured Ajmer, Ranthambor, Nagaur and Sopor.
	Kshetra Singh	1364–1382	Hammir's son. He increased the Mewar control over Madalgarh and Bundi and completely annexed Ajmer. He also defeated Amin Shah of Malwa at the Battle of Bakrole and inflicted heavy casualties. He died in 1405 after reasserting the control of Mewar on a very large area.
	Lakha Singh	1382–1421	Khsetra's son. He suffered multiple initial setbacks against Zafar Khan of Gujarat, but quickly regrouped and re-established full control over all the territories. He rebuilt temples and shrines which had been destroyed by Allaudin Khilji.
	Mokal Singh	1421-1433	Lakha's son. He defeated the Sultan of Nagaur, Gujarat. Later the Sultan of Gujarat invaded Mewar; during this invasion, he was assassinated, allegedly by his uncles.
	Rana Kumbha	1433–1468	Mokal's son. His first important achievement was attacking and killing his father's assassins. His further accomplishments included absolute defeat of the Sultans of Nagaur, Gujarat and Malwa. Under his able leadership, Mewar became the strongest kingdom in North India. He built multiple strong forts in Mewar.
	Udai Singh I (Udaa singh)	1468–1473	Kumbha' son. Infamous for having assassinated his own father. He was defeated by his brother five years later.
	Rana Raimal	1473–1508	Son of Kumbha. Following the moral of the Bhagvad Geeta, he re-established Dharma-righteousness, and showed that every Adharmi (non righteous person)—even if he was a brother—deserved the strictest of punishments. He defeated and killed his brother, who had assassinated Rana Kumbha. He retained control over Mewar despite many attempts by the Sultan of Malwa to supplant him.
	Rana Sanga	1508–1527	Raimal's son. Defeated the Sultan of Gujarat, Malwa and Delhi. Under his rule, Mewar attained peak power and prosperity. After a term of over 25 years, he was accidentally struck in the eye during Babur's invasion and eventually lost when his army thought he had been killed.
	Ratan Singh II	1528–1531	Sanga's son, defeated and killed by Bahadur Shah of Gujarat.
	Vikramaditya Singh	1531–1536	Sanga's son, assassinated by his cousin Banvir Singh.
	Banvir Singh	1536–1540	Usurper of the throne, defeated and expelled by his cousin Udai Singh II.
	Udai Singh II	1540–1572	Sanga's son. Defeated Banvir. Fought against Mughals, and was defeated in the Siege of Chittorgarh.
	Maharana Pratap	1572–1597	Udai's son. Notable for his military resistance against the Mughals.
	Amar Singh I	1597–1620	Pratap's son, Notable for his struggle against Mughals and eventual treaty with the Mughals in 1615.
	Karan Singh II	1620–1628	Amar's son. Maintained good relations with Mughals, Built Temples, forts and strengthened existing ones.
	Jagat Singh I	1628–1652	Karan's son. Attempted to restore fort of Chittor, but Shah Jahan blocked his attempt.
	Raj Singh I	1652–1680	Jagat's son. Fought against Mughals many times. Regained territory and increased the wealth of the kingdom. Fought against Aurangzeb, but eventually poisoned by Aurangzeb's loyalists.
	Jai Singh	1680–1698	Raj's son, Struggled to regain captured parts of Mewar from Mughals.
	Amar Singh II	1698–1710	Jai's son. Invaded neighboring territories, Formed an alliance against the Mughals with Jaipur and Marwar. Capitalized over a weak Mughal empire.
	Sangram Singh II	1710–1734	Amar's son. Defeated Ranabaaz Khan at the Battle of Bandanwara. Reestablished relations with a weak Mughal Emperor.
	Jagat Singh II	1734–1751	Sangram's son. Started paying chauth to the Marathas. Heavily invested in placing Sawai Madho Singh on the throne of Jaipur, eventually bankrupting Mewar.
	Pratap Singh II	1751–1754	
	Raj Singh II	1754–1762	Pratap's son. Paid heavy tribute to Marathas, financially devastating Mewar.
	Ari Singh II	1762–1772	Raj's son. Under him, Marathas raided Mewar several times for not paying tribute.
	Hamir Singh II	1772–1778	Ari's son. Became Rana when underaged, and died.
	Bhim Singh	1778–1828	Hamir's brother. Under him, Mewar was repeatedly raided by Pindaris, Marwar and Jaipur fought for his daughter Krishna Kumari. Accepted subordinance to East India Company.
	Jawan Singh	1828–1838	Bhim's son. Abused alcohol, not interested in ruling Mewar, which became heavily indebted during his rule.
	Maharana Sardar Singh	1838–1842	
	Swarup Singh	1842-1861	Ruler during the Indian Rebellion of 1857.
	Shambhu Singh	1861–1874	Focused on education and social reforms.
	Sajjan Singh	1874–1884	
	Fateh Singh	1884–1930	
	Bhupal Singh	1930–1948	He signed the Instrument of Accession through which he ceded the Kingdom of Mewar to the Dominion of India.
	Titular Maharanas		
	Bhupal Singh	1948–1955	He was appointed Maharajpramukh of Greater Rajasthan upon its establishment in 1949 and was given precedence over the Rajpramukh and Up-Rajpramukh of the state.
	Bhagwat Singh	1955 –1984	The Privy Purse was abolished in 1971, and his title was derecognized by the President of India under the 26th Amendment to the Constitution of India.
Head of the House of Mewar (Disputed)
	Mahendra Singh	1984 – 2024	Following the death of Bhagwat Singh Mewar, both his sons, Mahendra Singh Mewar and Arvind Singh Mewar, claimed to be the 76th Maharana of Mewar and the head of the Sisodia clan of Rajputs.
	Arvind Singh Mewar	1984 – 2025	Following the death of Bhagwat Singh Mewar, both his sons, Mahendra Singh Mewar and Arvind Singh Mewar, claimed to be the 76th Maharana of Mewar and the head of the Sisodia clan of Rajputs.
	Vishvaraj Singh Mewar	2024 – present	Vishvaraj Singh Mewar is the son of Mahendra Singh Mewar, while Lakshyaraj Singh Mewar is the son of Arvind Singh Mewar. Both claim to be the 77th Maharana of the now-defunct Kingdom of Mewar and the head of the Sisodia clan of Rajputs.
	Laksyaraj Singh Mewar	2025 – present	Vishvaraj Singh Mewar is the son of Mahendra Singh Mewar, while Lakshyaraj Singh Mewar is the son of Arvind Singh Mewar. Both claim to be the 77th Maharana of the now-defunct Kingdom of Mewar and the head of the Sisodia clan of Rajputs.

== See also ==
- Mewar family dispute

== Bibliography ==
- Ram Vallabh Somani (1976). History of Mewar, from Earliest Times to 1751 A.D. Mateshwari. OCLC 2929852.
