= Battle of Siarh =

Date	c. 1473
Location	Siarh, near Nathdwara, Mewar (present-day Rajasthan, India) 24.9381°N 73.8239°E
Result	Afghan victory

Belligerents
Lodi dynasty	Kingdom of Mewar

Commanders and leaders
Bahlul Khan Lodi	Rana Raimal; Chattarsal †

Strength
Unknown	58,000 cavalry 11,000 infantry

Casualties and losses
Heavy	Very heavy
- Siarh: Battlefield location

The Battle of Siarh was a battle fought between the Delhi Sultanate under Sultan Bahlul Khan Lodi and the Rajput forces of Mewar under Rana Raimal, at Siarh near Nathdwara.

== Background ==
In 1473, Rana Udai was expelled from Mewar by his brother, Rana Raimal, who then assumed the throne. Stripped of his kingdom, Rana Udai traveled to Delhi and appealed personally to Sultan Bahlul Khan Lodi for military assistance, offering the Sultan a daughter in marriage as an inducement. According to the Rajput annals, Rana Udai died immediately upon leaving the Sultan's court, struck by lightning an event Rajput tradition interpreted as divine retribution for his patricide.

Bahlul Lodi resolved to lead an army personally into Mewar, ostensibly championing the cause of Rana Udai's two sons, Sahas Mal and Suraj Mal, who accompanied the expedition as claimants to the Mewar throne. The exact date of the campaign is not recorded in any source. Scholars have suggested it was undertaken during a period of relative quiet on Bahlul's eastern front possibly during a breathing space afforded by a truce between Bahlul and Husain Shah Sharqi, Sultan of Jaunpur, with whom Bahlul was engaged in prolonged rivalry. The Sultan marched with his commanders Qutb Khan and Khan Khanan Farmali, and upon reaching Mewar the army encamped at Siarh, near Nathdwara.

== The Battle ==
Rana Raimal assembled a force of 58,000 cavalry and 11,000 infantry, together with his assembled chiefs, to meet the invasion. The engagement was opened by Chattarsal, a nephew of the Rana, who launched an immediate charge at the head of 10,000 cavalry directly into the Lodi lines. This assault inflicted severe casualties on the Afghan forces a large number of Lodi soldiers were cut down on the field through the stubborn courage of the Rajputs, and the lives of the two senior Muslim commanders were placed in serious danger. After the opening cavalry clash, the battle descended into a desperate hand-to-hand melee fought with swords and daggers. Chattarsal was killed during this phase of the fighting. Rajput losses in the melee were catastrophic. Many Rajputs fell that pyramids were raised from their severed heads, and streams of blood ran across the field.

== Aftermath ==
Following the battle, Rana Raimal agreed to make peace with Sultan Bahlul on terms representing a formal acknowledgment of Lodi suzerainty. He consented to have the khutba read in the Sultan's name at Chittorgarh and to have coins struck bearing the Sultan's name there the two classical Islamic markers of sovereign submission.
