= Udai Singh I =

Rana of Mewar from 1468 to 1473

Rana Udai Singh I
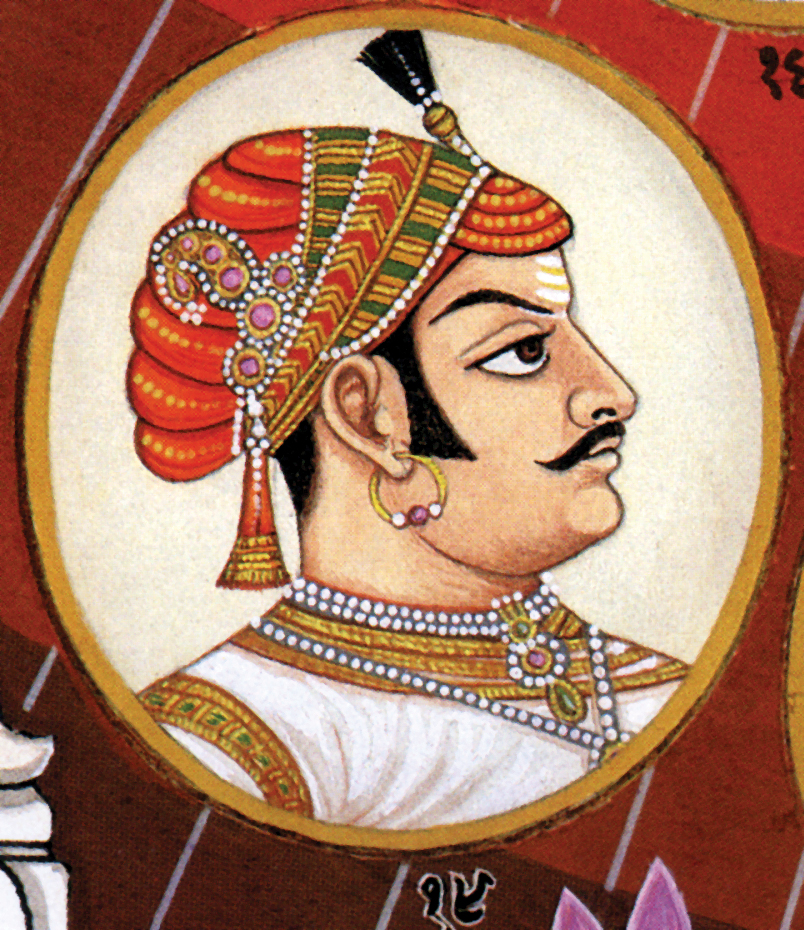

Rana of Mewar
- Reign: 1468–1473
- Predecessor: Kumbhkaran Singh
- Successor: Raimal Singh
- Died: 1473
- Spouse: (not known)
- Issue: Surajmal; Sahasmal
Names
- Rana Udai Singh Sisodia
- Dynasty: Sisodias of Mewar
- Father: Rana Kumbha
- Mother: (not known)

Udai Singh I, also known as Udaikaran, was the Sisodia Rajput ruler of Mewar Kingdom. He was the eldest son of Rana Kumbha whom he assassinated to gain the throne of Mewar.

== Biography ==
Rana Udaykaran/uda was born to Rana Kumbha as his eldest son. He was suspicious that his father wanted to make his younger brother, Raimal, his successor. So he assassinated his father Rana Kumbha in the year 1468 while he was praying in the Kumbhashyam Temple in Kumbhalgarh Fort. Thereafter, he became known as pitrahanta (patricide) or "Uda Hatiyaro" (Uda, The Murderer). Udai Singh himself died in 1473, with the cause of death sometimes being stated as being struck by lightning but more likely to have also been murdered by his own brother Rana Raimal to avenge the death of their father, Rana Kumbha.

The death by lightning account is mentioned in the late 19th century Mewar chronicle "Vir Vinod" by the court poet Kaviraj Shyamaldas, which James Tod mistook to be about the sultan of Delhi rather than Ghiyath Shah, the Sultan of Malwa Sultanate .It was Ghiyath Shah who agreed to render assistance to Udai Singh, and in return Udai Singh agreed to give his daughter in marriage to him. The proposed matrimonial alliance aimed at establishing friendly relations between the two kingdoms. But destiny had it otherwise. Rana Udai Singh was struck with lightning, when he was returning to his camp, after completing the negotiations, and thus the entire plan fell through and no marriage took place. His two sons Surajmal and Sahasmal, however, remained in the Malwa court and continued to press the Sultan to help them in recovering their patrimony. Sultan Ghiyath Shah finally agreed to assist them and with his forces marched on Chittor, the capital of Mewar.

Udai Singh I Sisodia Rajput Clan Born: 1468 Died: 1473
| Preceded by Rana Kumbha | Sisodia Rajput Ruler; 1468–1473 | Succeeded by Rana Raimal |
