= Abbas Sadriwala =

Abbas Sadriwalla (Hindi: अब्बास सद्रीवाला; born 1948 in Bombay, now Mumbai, India) is chairman and CEO of the Fort Lauderdale-based Wireless Logix Group of seven companies, which offer Wi-Fi technologies.

== History ==
Sadriwalla is himself of Mewari origin. His father comes from the village of Bari Sadri in the Mewar region of Rajasthan (hence the name Sadriwalla), from where he migrated to Mumbai as a penniless teenager. After working for several years with a rubber products company, he set up his own rubber firm which eventually grew into Rubber Industries India Pvt Ltd, one of the largest rubber products manufacturers in India till the 1970s.

Sadriwalla had to take charge of the family rubber business at the age of 18 after his father died prematurely in 1966. But he wanted to become a pilot and opted to move to the United States in 1973 to pursue his dream, leaving the family fortune to his three siblings.

Sadriwalla started life in the US from scratch, working in a string of shop floor jobs while financing his own pilot training. "I arrived," he remembers, "with very little money in my pocket." In 1976, he qualified as a commercial pilot and trained further to become a pilot instructor. Between 1978 and 1984, he taught flying in South Florida. Always a technology buff, Sadriwalla spotted an opportunity to supply special purpose computers to the aviation industry in 1990 and launched a company called ADS (Application Designed Systems) Associates. After speciality computers became less relevant in a rapidly changing technology marketplace, he diversified into the pager business and built a highly profitable company called Pageco International to manufacture pager crystals. As pagers were displaced by cell phones, Abbas moved into Wi-Fi technology. Pursuing his interest in R&D Sadriwalla is currently the CEO of Liquiguard Technolologies, Inc., a manufacturer that develops coatings for everyday objects.

== Personal life ==
Sadriwalla lives in Fort Lauderdale with his wife Deborah and sons Abbas and Alexander.
