= Sisodia dynasty =

Royal Rajput dynasty of Rajasthan

Sisodia dynasty House of Mewar
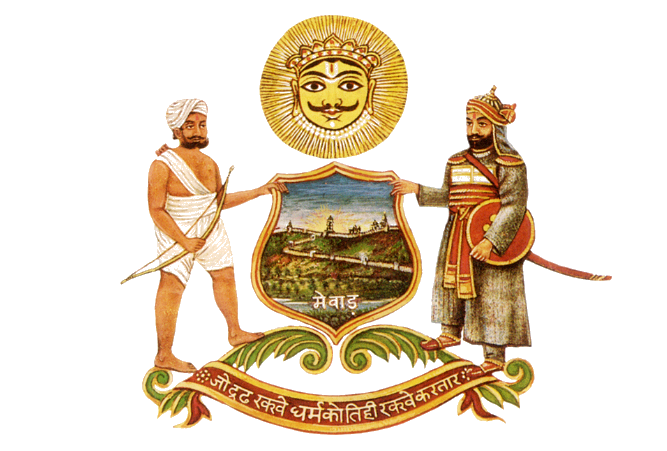
- Coat of arms

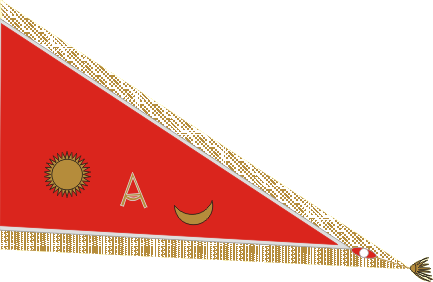
- Flag of Kingdom of Mewar
- Parent house: Guhila dynasty
- Country: Kingdom of Mewar
- Founded: 1326; 700 years ago
- Founder: Rana Hammir Singh
- Current head: Disputed: Vishvaraj Singh Mewar; Lakshyaraj Singh Mewar
- Final ruler: Bhagwat Singh Mewar
- Titles: Maharana, Rana
- Cadet branches: Chundawat • Ranawat Shaktawat • Kanawat • Sarangdevot

The Sisodia was a Rajput dynasty belonging to the clan that ruled over the Kingdom of Mewar, in the region of Mewar in Rajasthan, India. The Sisodias were an off-shoot of the Guhila Dynasty and claimed descent from the Suryavamsha (Solar dynasty).

== Origins ==
The Sisodia dynasty traced its ancestry to Rahapa, a son of the 12th century Guhila King Ranasimha. He founded the village of Shisoda, in modern day Rajsamand district, as his capital, after which his descendants were called Sisodias. The main branch of the Guhila dynasty ended with their defeat against the Khalji dynasty at the Siege of Chittorgarh (1303). In 1326, Rana Hammir, who belonged to Sisodiya branch, reclaimed control of the region with the help of Baruji Sauda and his Charan allies, re-established the dynasty, and also became the founder of the Sisodia dynasty clan, a branch of the Guhila dynasty, to which every succeeding Maharana of Mewar belonged, and the Sisodias regained control of Chittor, the former Guhila capital. The Sisodiyas were engaged in multiple battles against Sultans of Malwa, Nagor, Gujarat and Delhi. They were a significant reason in weakening of the adjacent sultanates including the Delhi Sultanate.

According to the Rajprashasti genealogy, one of these – Rana Samar – married Prithi, the sister of Prithviraj Chauhan. His grandson Rahapa adopted the title Rana (monarch). Rahapa's descendants spent some time at a place called Sisoda, and therefore, came to be known as "Sisodia".

== History ==
The most notable Sisodia rulers were Rana Hamir (r. 1326–1364), Rana Kumbha (r. 1433–1468), Rana Sanga (r.1508–1528) and Rana Pratap (r. 1572–1597). The Bhonsle clan, to which the Maratha Empire's founder Shivaji belonged, also claimed descent from a branch of the royal Sisodia family. Nainsi in his book mentioned Shahji descended from Chacha, son of Rana Lakha. Similarly, Rana dynasty of Nepal also claimed descent from Ranas of Mewar.

According to the Sisodia Chronicles, when the Delhi Sultan Alauddin Khalji attacked Chittorgarh in 1303, the Sisodia men performed Saka (fighting to the death), while their women committed Jauhar (self-immolation in preference to becoming enemy captives). This was repeated twice: when Bahadur Shah of Gujarat besieged Chittorgarh in 1535, and when the Mughal emperor Akbar conquered it in 1567.

Frequent skirmishes with the Mughals greatly reduced the Sisodia power and the size of their kingdom. The Sisodias ultimately accepted the Mughal suzerainty, and some even fought in the Mughal army. However, the art and literary works commissioned by the subsequent Sisodia rulers emphasized their pre-Mughal past. The Sisodias were the last Rajput dynasty to ally with the Mughals, and unlike other Rajput clans, never intermarried with the Mughal imperial family. The Sisodias cultivated an elite identity distinct from other Rajput clans through the poetic legends, eulogies and visual arts commissioned by them. James Tod, an officer of the British East India Company, relied on these works for his book Annals and Antiquities of Rajasthan, or the central and western Rajpoot states of India (1829–1832). His widely read work further helped spread the views of the Sisodias as a superior Rajput clan in colonial and post-colonial India.

== Sub-Clans ==
- Chundawat - descendants of Rana Chunda Sisodia.
- Shaktawat - descendants of Shakti Singh.
- Ranawat - descendants of Maharana Pratap.
- Kanawat - descendants of Kanh Singh.

== Princely States ==
- Kingdom of Mewar
- Shahpura State
- Dharampur State
- Dungarpur State
- Barwani State
- Pratapgarh State
- Banswara State

== List of Rulers ==
- Rana Hammir (1326–1364) established the sisodiya dynasty
- Rana Kshetra (1364–1382)
- Rana Lakha (1382–1421)
- Rana Mokal (1421–1433)
- Rana Kumbha (1433–1468)
- Rana Udai I (1468–1473)
- Rana Raimal (1473–1508)
- Rana Sanga (1508–1527), Under his rule Mewar reached its pinnacle in power and prosperity.
- Rana Ratan II (1528–1531)
- Rana Vikramaditya (1531–1536)
- Banvir (1536–1540)
- Rana Udai II (1540–1572)
- Maharana Pratap (1572–1597), 13th king of Mewar, notable for his military resistance against the Mughals.
- Amar Singh I (1597–1620)
- Karan Singh II (1620–1628)
- Jagat Singh I (1628–1652)
- Raj Singh I (1652–1680)
- Jai Singh (1680–1698)
- Amar Singh II (1698–1710)
- Sangram Singh II (1710–1734)
- Jagat Singh II (1734–1751)
- Pratap Singh II (1751–1754)
- Raj Singh II (1754–1762)
- Ari Singh II (1762–1772)
- Hamir Singh II (1772–1778)
- Bhim Singh (1778–1828)
- Jawan Singh (1828–1838)
- Sardar Singh (1838–1842)
- Swarup Singh (1842–1861)
- Shambhu Singh (1861–1874)
- Sajjan Singh (1874–1884)
- Fateh Singh (1884–1930)
- Bhupal Singh (1930–1947)

=== Titular Maharanas ===
- Bhupal Singh (1947–1955)
- Bhagwat Singh Mewar (1955–1984)
- Mahendra Singh Mewar (1984–2024)
- Vishvaraj Singh Mewar (2024 - )

== See also ==
- List of Ranas of Mewar
- Chundawat
- Rajput clans
