= Bhupal Singh =

Last ruling Maharana of Udaipur from 1930–1948 and Rajpramukh from 1948–1955

Sir Bhupal Singh
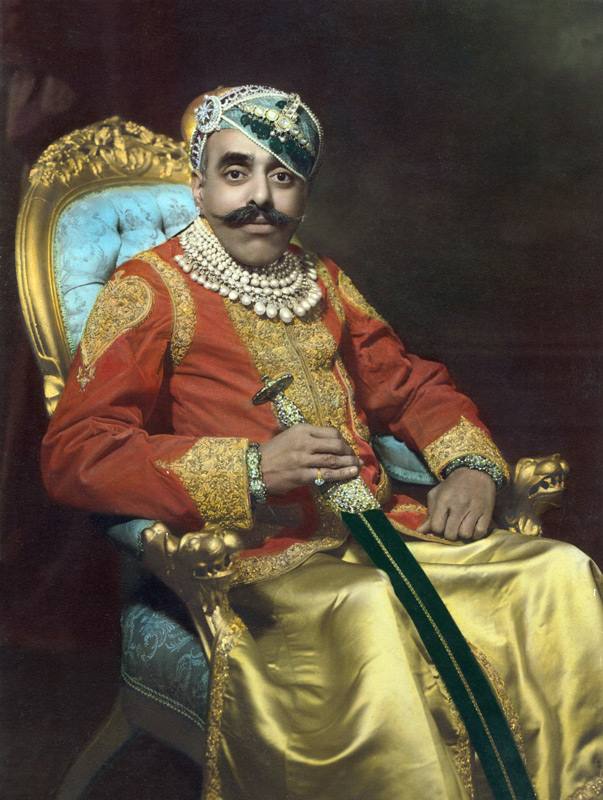
- Bhupal Singh

Maharana of Udaipur
- Reign: 24 May 1930 – 18 April 1948
- Predecessor: Fateh Singh
- Titular reign: 18 April 1948 – 4 July 1955
- Successor: Bhagwat Singh Mewar
- Born: 1884
- Died: 4 July 1955 (aged 70–71)
- Issue: Bhagwat Singh Mewar (adoptive son)
- House: Sisodia
- Father: Fateh Singh

Rajpramukh of Rajasthan
- In office 18 April 1948 – 1 April 1949
- Preceded by: Bhim Singh II
- Succeeded by: Man Singh II

Maha-Rajpramukh
- In office 1 April 1949 – 4 July 1955

Shri Maharana Sir Bhupal Singh Bahadur KCIE (1884 – 4 July 1955), also spelt Bhopal Singh, was the ruler of the Indian princely state of Udaipur (Mewar) from 1930 and also Rajpramukh of Rajasthan from 1948 until his death on 4 July 1955.

== Biography ==
Singh was born in 1884, a year before the accession of his father Fateh Singh to the throne of Mewar and Udaipur as Maharana. He became paralyzed at the age of 5. On 28 July 1921, following some social unrest in Mewar, his father was formally deposed, while being allowed to retain his titular title, and effective power in the state fell into the hands of Bhupal as his son and heir. He became ruler of the state in name as well as in fact in 1930. After the independence and partition of British India in 1947, Singh was one of the first of the Indian princes to sign an Instrument of Accession to the new Dominion of India, and on 18 April 1948 he became Rajpramukh of Rajasthan, succeeding Sir Bhim Singh, Maharaja of Kotah. With effect from 1 April 1949 his title was raised to Maha Rajpramukh. Also he was held titles of Honorary Major-General, Indian Army 15 October 1946 (earlier Honorary Lt.-Col. 4 August 1939), Honorary Colonel, Indian Grenadiers, 1 June 1954.

Bhagwat Singh succeeded him as the titular ruler of the state.

One of Bhupal Singh's palaces was Jag Niwas, on an island in Lake Pichola, for which he undertook major repairs and restorations. The palace is now operated as a luxury hotel.
