= Mahendra Singh Mewar =

Indian politician (1941–2024)

- Maharana
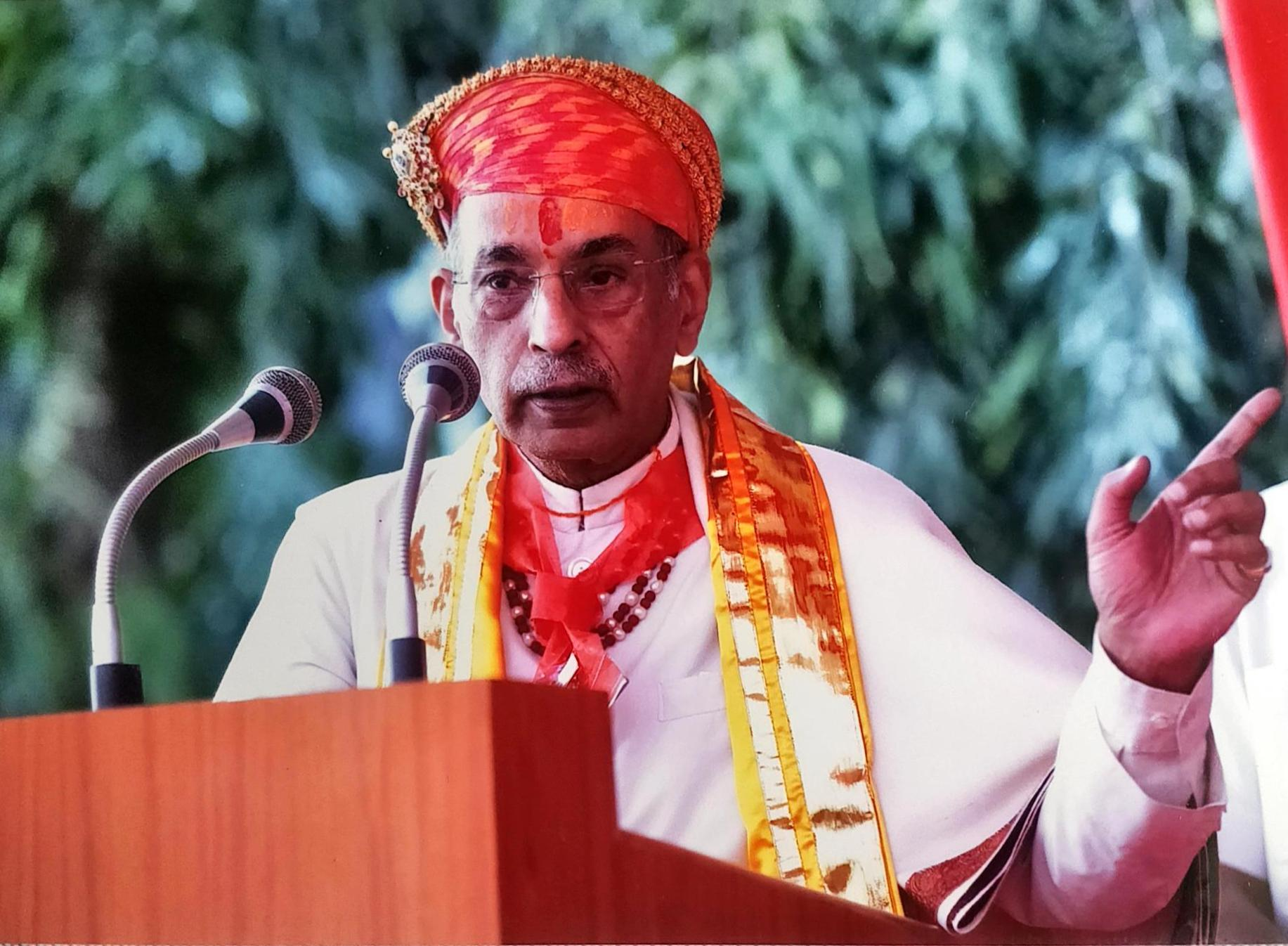
- Mahendra Singh in 2021

Head of the House of Mewar (disputed)
- Tenure: 3 November 1984 – 10 November 2024
- Predecessor: Bhagwat Singh Mewar
- Successor: Vishvaraj Singh Mewar
- Born: 24 February 1941; Udaipur, Udaipur State, British India (present-day Rajasthan, India)
- Died: 10 November 2024 (aged 83)
- Spouse: Princess Nirupama Kumari of Tehri Garhwal
- Issue: Prince Vishvaraj Singh Mewar; Princess Trivikrama Kumari
- Dynasty: Sisodia
- Father: Bhagwat Singh Mewar
- Mother: Princess Sushila Kumari of Bikaner
- Political Party: Bharatiya Janata Party and Indian National Congress

Mahendra Singh Mewar (Note: Hindi: Mahendra Singha Mewaṛa, pronounced [məɦɜndɾᵊ sɪɳɣʰ meʋäːɽ]) (24 February 1941 – 10 November 2024) was an Indian aristocrat and politician who served as a Member of Parliament (Lok Sabha) and was the disputed Head of the House of Mewar.

== Business and political career ==
Mahendra had led a yatra with Atal Bihari Vajpayee in Mewar. Mahendra was elected to the Lok Sabha from Chittorgarh in the 1989 Indian general election from BJP with a record winning margin of over 190,000 votes. He was a Member, Consultative Committee, Ministry of Industry, 1990. He joined Indian National Congress and contested from Chittorgarh Constituency but lost to Jaswant Singh of the BJP. He also contested from Bhilwara Constituency where he lost to Subhash Chandra Baheria in 1996 Lok Sabha elections. His father-in-law Manabendra Shah, was an eight-time Member of Parliament.

He was also the President, Maharana Bhupal Institutions (under Vidya Pracharini Sabha, Udaipur, Rajasthan); St. Vice-President, General Council and Board of Governors, Mayo College, Ajmer; Patron, Akhil Bharatiya and Mewar Kshetra Kshatriya Mahasabha.

== Personal life ==
Mahendra Singh Mewar was the eldest son of Mewar's titular ruler Bhagwat Singh. He graduated from Mayo College, Ajmer. He completed his B.A. at Government College, Ajmer and resided in Samor Bagh.

Singh was married to Nirupama Kumari of Tehri Garhwal and had a son, Vishvaraj Singh Mewar, and a daughter.

He died on 10 November 2024, at the age of 83.

== Dispute over succession ==
In 1984, Maharana Bhagwat Singh willed his entire property through a trust to younger son Arvind. He not only made Arvind the executor of the will, but also included daughter Yogeshwari Kumari as a trustee. Elder son Mahendra Singh, who had a year before accused his father of wasteful expenditure, polygamy and sought division of the vast property, was left out.

However, after the demise of Late Bhagwat Singh ji Mewar of Udaipur, as his eldest son, Mahendra Singhji Mewar was 'Crowned' the Maharana of Mewar -76th Custodian of the Shrine, in a Raj Tilak ceremony on 19 November 1984, with the religious ceremonies and public participation within the City Palace, Udaipur, and thereafter the procession and "darshan" before Shri Eklingji at Kailashpuri.

His younger brother, Arvind Singh Mewar has since however, claimed that he is the Head of the Family. The Estate of Late Bhagwat Singh Mewar of Udaipur has been declared a H.U.F (Hindu United Family - Joint Family) by the Income Tax Tribunal in 1981 and is subject to a partition suit since 1983. Stay orders have been applicable on this Estate since and the activities initiated, expanded, alterations undertaken by Shri Arvind Singh Mewar have been during the pendency of these orders. Mahendra Singh Mewar had filed a petition in the court demanding equal share of property for family members and finally the decree has been passed in his favour. The court has also put an immediate stop to all commercial activities at movable and immovable properties like Shambu Niwas, Badi Pal and Ghasghar which have not been given to any companies or trusts so far. All movable and immovable properties which have not been transferred to the company, trustees or persons, such as Shambhu Niwas, Badi Pal, Grass House, etc will be used by three parties—Mahendra Singh, Arvind Singh and Yageshwari Devi for four years. Since these properties are currently with Arvind Singh, he has been asked to give the said assets, accounts and documents to his elder brother, Mahendra Singh on 1 April 2021. Mahendra Singh will give the property to Yageshwari on 1 April 2025. After this, Yageshwari on 1 April 2029 will hand over these assets to Arvind Singh. The asset transfer process will start from January 2021.

Arvind Singh's place of residence is Shambhu Niwas Palace and their ancestral hunting lodge Shikarbadi Palace. On the demise of Late Bhagwat Singh Mewar of Udaipur, parts of the Palace, specifically those in which Late Maharana Bhagwat Singh ji Mewar of Udaipur was residing were sealed by Mahendra Singh Mewar. Against orders of the High Court of Rajasthan, the government / administration handed over these parts to Arvind Singh for which a contempt petition is under adjudication before the Supreme Court of India. Mahendra Singh Mewar had been permitted by the Supreme Court of India to take steps to repossess these parts of the Palace. It is under these circumstances that Arvind Singh has been residing in the City Palace.

The relationship between the two branches of the family have remained tense. While in the international press, Arvind Singh Mewar is mentioned as the current head of the family, the local old noble families of Udaipur recognised Maharana Mahendra Singhji Mewar as the rightful head.

== See also ==
- Mewar
- Arvind Singh Mewar
- List of Ranas of Mewar
- Kingdom of Mewar
- Mewar family dispute
