= Bhagwat Singh of Mewar =

Maharana of Udaipur from 1955 to 1984

Bhagwat Singh Mewar
- Maharana
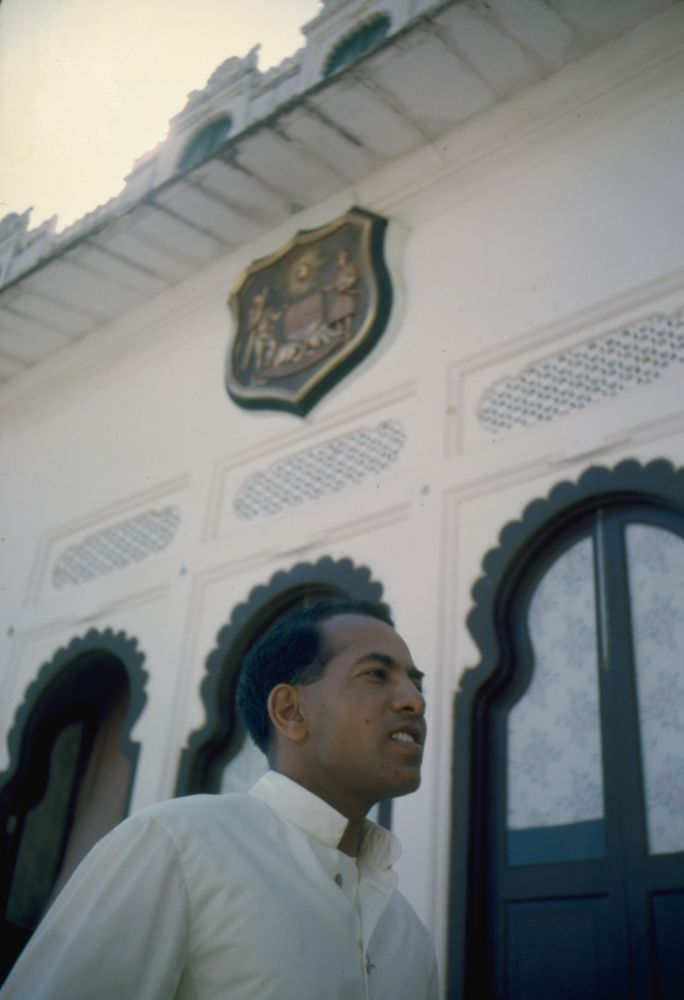

Maharana of Udaipur
- Titular reign: 4 July 1955 – 28 December 1971
- Predecessor: Bhupal Singh
- Successor: Position abolished by the 26th Amendment of the Indian Constitution

Head of the House of Mewar
- Tenure: 4 July 1955 – 3 November 1984
- Predecessor: Bhupal Singh
- Successor: Disputed between: Arvind Singh Mewar; Mahendra Singh Mewar
- Born: 20 June 1921; Udaipur, Udaipur State, British India (present-day Rajasthan, India)
- Died: 3 November 1984 (aged 63); Udaipur, Rajasthan, India
- Wives: Sushila Kumari (m. 1940); Annabella Parker
- Issue Detail: Mahendra Singh Mewar; Yogeshwari Kumari; Arvind Singh Mewar
- Dynasty: Sisodia
- Father: Bhupal Singh (adoptive); Pratap Singh (biological)
- Mother: Virad Kanwar
- Education: Mayo College

Bhagwat Singh Mewar (Note: Hindi pronunciation: [ˈbʱɑːɡʋət ˈsɪ́ŋʱ meːˈʋɑːɽ]) (20 June 1921 – 3 November 1984) was the titular Maharana of Udaipur from 4 July 1955 until the title was abolished in 1971. He also became the chairman, Vishva Hindu Parishad in 1969 unanimously.

== Early life, family, and education ==
Mewar was born on 20 June 1921 to Pratap Singh of Shivrati and his wife Virad Kanwar. His biological family claimed descent from Arjun Singh, the fourth son of Sangram Singh II. Bhupal Singh, who had no male issue to succeed him in due course of time, adopted Mewar as his son and successor in 1939, and granted Mewar's biological father the estate of Bhupalgarh. He was educated at Mayo College in Ajmer. Mewar married twice. Firstly, on 29 February 1940, to Sushila Kumari, a daughter of Sadul Singh, the Maharaja of Bikaner, and his wife, Sudarshan Prasad Kumari, who was from Rewa. Secondly, to Annabella Parker in the 1960s. Mewar had three children by his first wife: two sons, Mahendra Singh Mewar and Arvind Singh Mewar, and a daughter, Yogeshwari Kumari.

== Reign ==
Upon the death of his adoptive father on 4 July 1955, he immediately succeeded him on the Udaipur throne. His succession as the ruler of Udaipur was recognised by Rajendra Prasad, in his capacity as the President of India, on 10 August 1955 with effect from 4 July 1955. At the same time, his privy purse was reduced to INR 1,000,000. He ceased to be recognised as the ruler of Udaipur by the Government of India when V. V. Giri, in his capacity as the President of India, issued an order to this effect on 6 September 1970.

Some of Bhagwat Singh's palaces were Jag Niwas, on an island in Lake Pichola, and Monsoon Palace, both since used for the filming of several films, including the James Bond film Octopussy in 1983.

== Cricket career ==
Bhagwat Singh played 31 first-class matches and scored 846 at an average of 18.35 and also took five wickets in his career spanning from 1945–46 to 1961–62, He played for both Rajputana cricket team as well as its successor Rajasthan cricket team.
