= Lake Palace =

Coordinates: 24.57507°N 73.68022°E

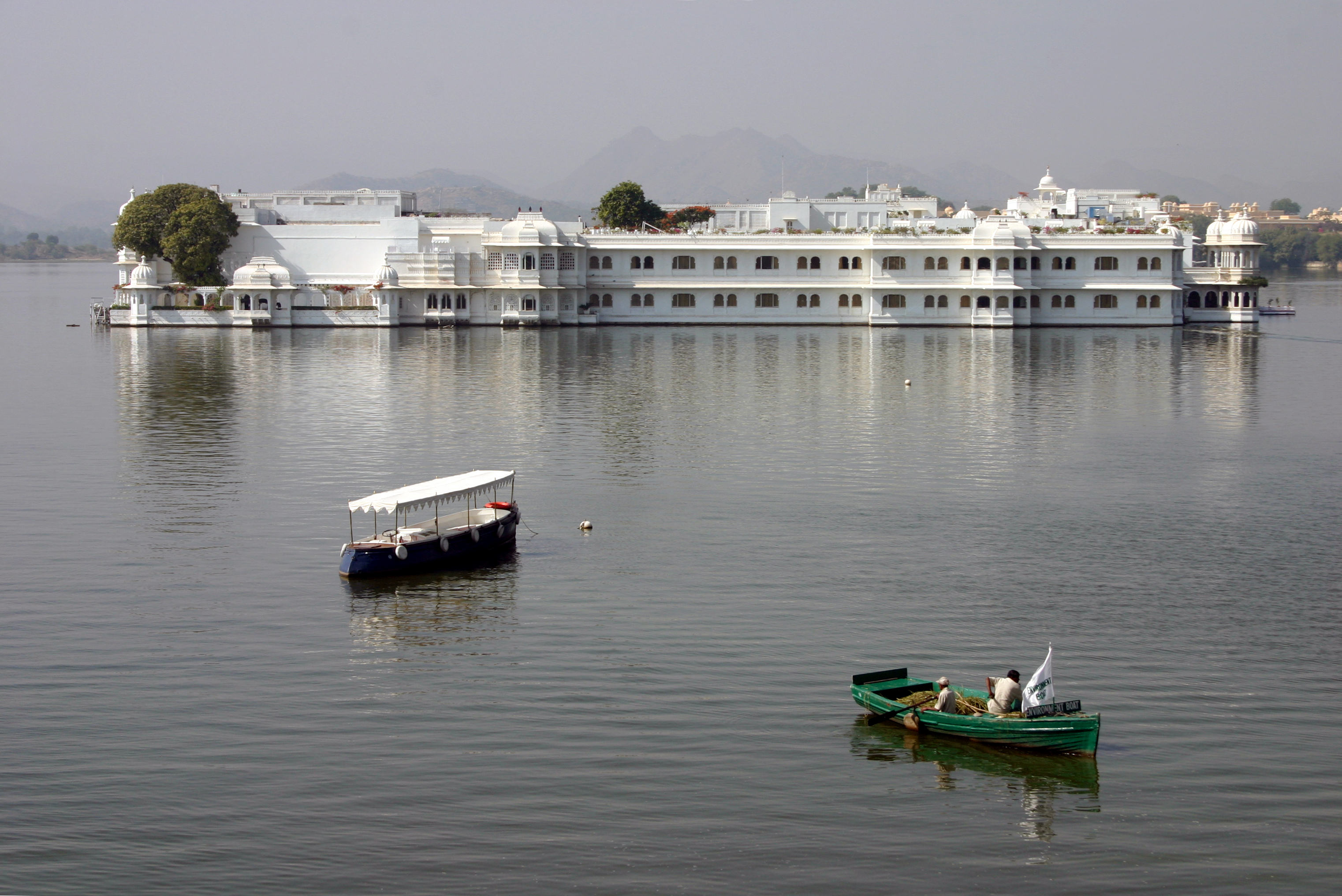
- Boats moving near the Lake Palace

- Location within Rajasthan

General information
- Architectural style: Rajput architecture
- Location: Udaipur, India
- Construction started: Rebuilt in 1746
- Client: Jagat Singh II

Lake Palace (formerly known as Jag Niwas Palace) is a former summer palace of the royal dynasty of Mewar, now operated as a hotel. The Lake Palace is located on the island of Jag Niwas in Lake Pichola, Udaipur, India, and its natural foundation spans 4 acres (16,000 m^{2}).

The Jag Niwas palace was constructed of white marble circa 1743–1746 by Maharana Jagat Singh II, the 62nd custodian of the House of Mewar. The palace, built to look like it is floating on the lake, was extensively used as a summer retreat for the Mewar royal family.

Currently, IHCL is managing the hotel and has done so for the last 50 years. The palace has attained global fame for its appearance and as a location for several hit movies.

== History ==
Lake Palace, and Pichola Lake was built by Rana Lakshasimha (Laakha) of Parmar Rajputs, in 1362 AD. The Lake Palace was rebuilt between 1743 and 1746 under the direction of the Maharana Jagat Singh II (62nd successor to the royal dynasty of Mewar) of Udaipur, Rajasthan as a summer palace. It was initially called Jagniwas or Jan Niwas after its founder.

The palace was constructed for facing east, allowing its inhabitants to pray to Surya, the Hindu sun god, at the crack of dawn. Jagat Singh felt that the City Palace was too public to invite the beautiful young ladies of Udaipur with decadent, moonlit picnics. Therefore a palace in the centre of Lake Pichola would offer much more privacy. The successive rulers used this palace as their summer resort, holding their regal durbars in its courtyards lined with columns, pillared terraces, fountains, and gardens.

The walls are made of black and white marbles and are adorned by semi-precious stones and ornamented niches. Gardens, fountains, pillared terraces and columns line its courtyards.

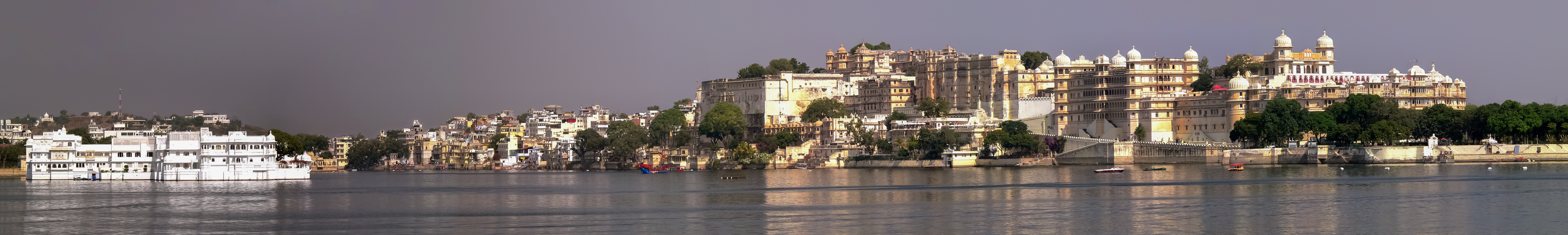
Relation of the palace to the city of Udaipur Panorama from Jag Mandir Island

The upper room is a perfect circle and is about 21 feet (6.4 m) in diameter. Its floor is inlaid with black and white marble, the walls are ornamented with niches and decorated with arabesques of colored stones, the dome is exquisitely beautiful in form.

During the famous Indian Sepoy Mutiny in 1857, several European families fled from Nimach and used the island as an asylum, offered to them by Maharana Swaroop Singh. To protect his guests, the Rana destroyed all the town's boats so that the rebels could not reach the island.

By the latter half of the 19th century, time and weather took their toll on the extraordinary water palaces of Udaipur. Pierre Loti, a French writer, described Jag Niwas as "slowly moldering in the damp emanations of the lake." About the same time bicyclists Fanny Bullock Workman and her husband William Hunter Workman were distressed by the 'cheap and tasteless style' of the interiors of the water palaces with "an assortment of infirm European furniture, wooden clocks, coloured glass ornaments, and children's toys, all of which seems to the visitor quite out of place, where he would naturally expect a dignified display of Eastern splendor."

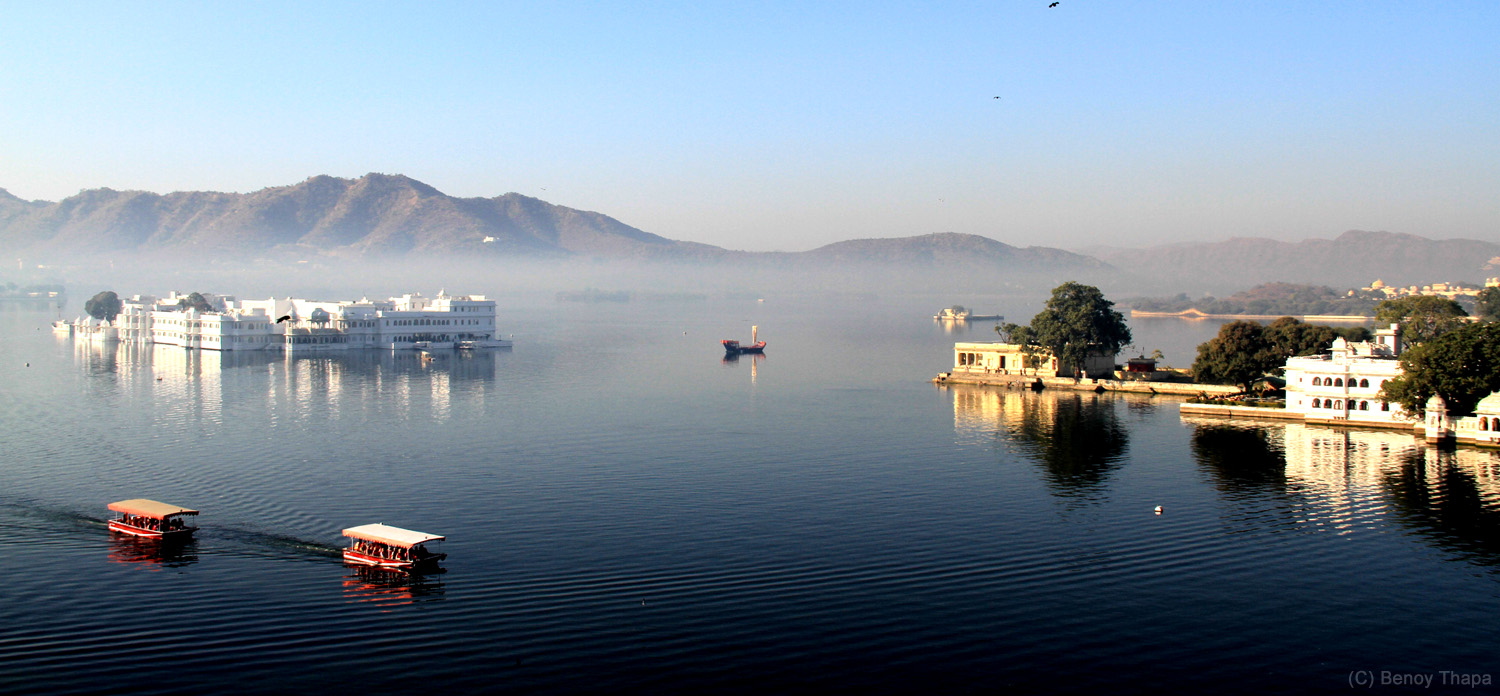
Lake Palace in Udaipur

The reign of Maharana Sir Bhopal Singh (1930–55) saw the addition of another pavilion, Chandra Prakash, but otherwise the Jag Niwas remained unaltered and decaying. Geoffrey Kendal, the theater personality, described the palace during his visit in the 1950s as "totally deserted, the stillness broken only by the humming of clouds of mosquitoes."

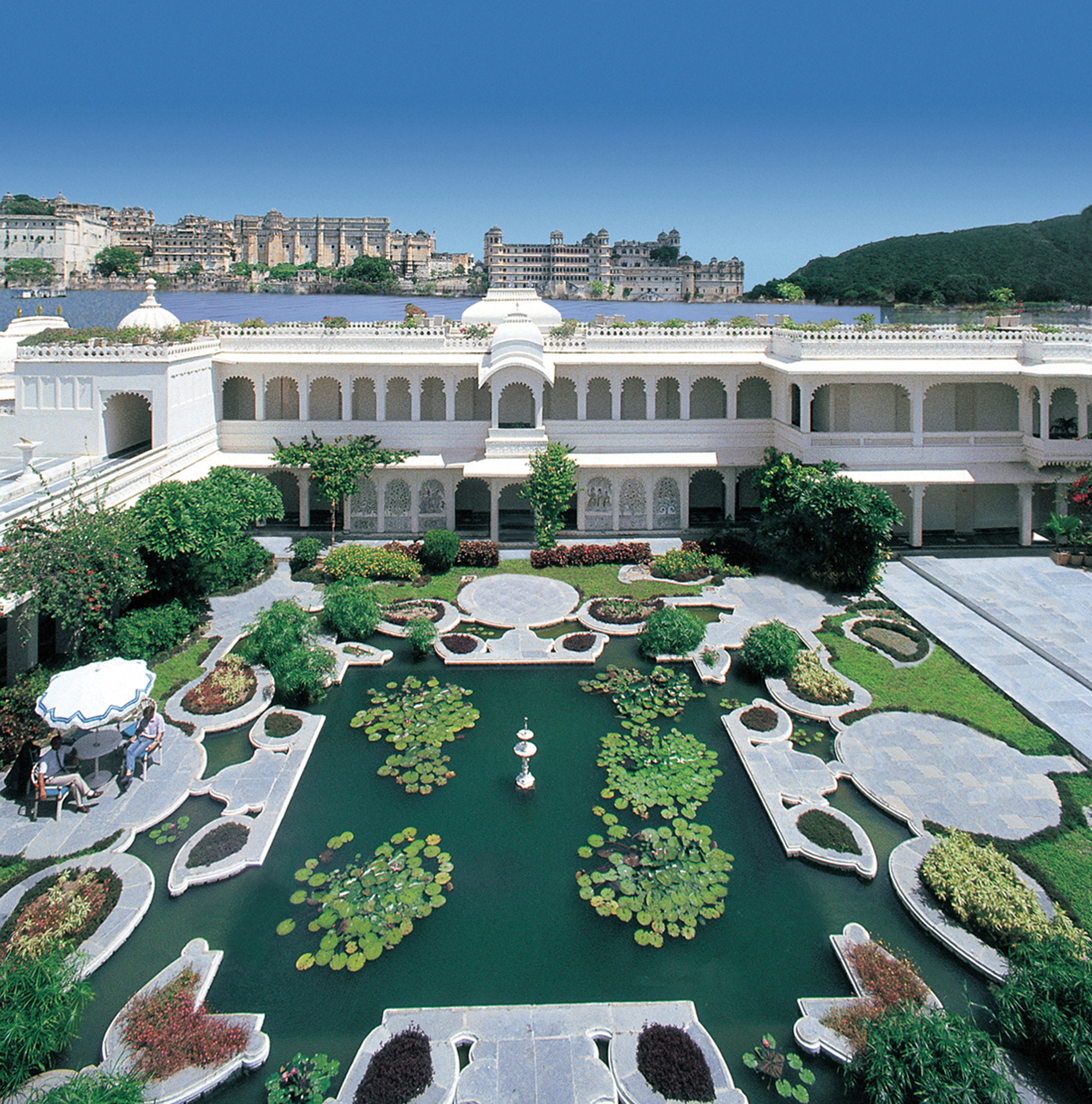
Lily Pond at Lake Palace, Udaipur

Bhagwat Singh decided to convert the Jag Niwas Palace into Udaipur's first luxury hotel. Didi Contractor, an American artist, became a design consultant to this hotel project. Didi's accounts gives an insight to the life and responsibility of the new Maharana of Udaipur:

I worked from 1961 to 1969 and what an adventure! His Highness, you know, was a real monarch – really like kings always were. So one had a sense of being one of the last people to be an artist for the king. It felt the way one imagines it was like working in the courts of the Renaissance. It was an experience of going back in time to an entirely different era, a different world. His Highness was actually working on a shoestring. He was not in dire straits, mind you, but when he came to the throne he inherited big problems like what to do with the 300 dancing girls that belonged to his predecessor Maharana Bhopal Singh. He tried to offer them scholarships to become nurses but they didn't want to move out of the palace so what could he do? He had to keep them. They were old crones by this time and on state occasions I remember they would come to sing and dance with their ghunghats [veils] down and occasionally one would lift hers to show a wizened old face underneath. He had something like twelve state elephants, and he had all these properties which were deteriorating. The buildings on Jag Niwas were starting to fall down and basically the Lake Palace was turned into a hotel because it seemed the only viable way that it could be maintained ... It was really a job of conservation.

Maharana Mahendra Singh, the current head of the Mewar dynasty was managing the Lake Palace Hotel when it got its 5 star rating. In 1971, Taj Hotels Resorts and Palaces took over management of the hotel and added another 75 rooms. In 2000, a second restoration was undertaken.

The "Royal Butlers" in the hotel are descendants of the original palace retainers.

Former guests have included Lord Curzon, Vivien Leigh, Queen Elizabeth, the Shah of Iran, the king of Nepal and US First Lady Jacqueline Kennedy.

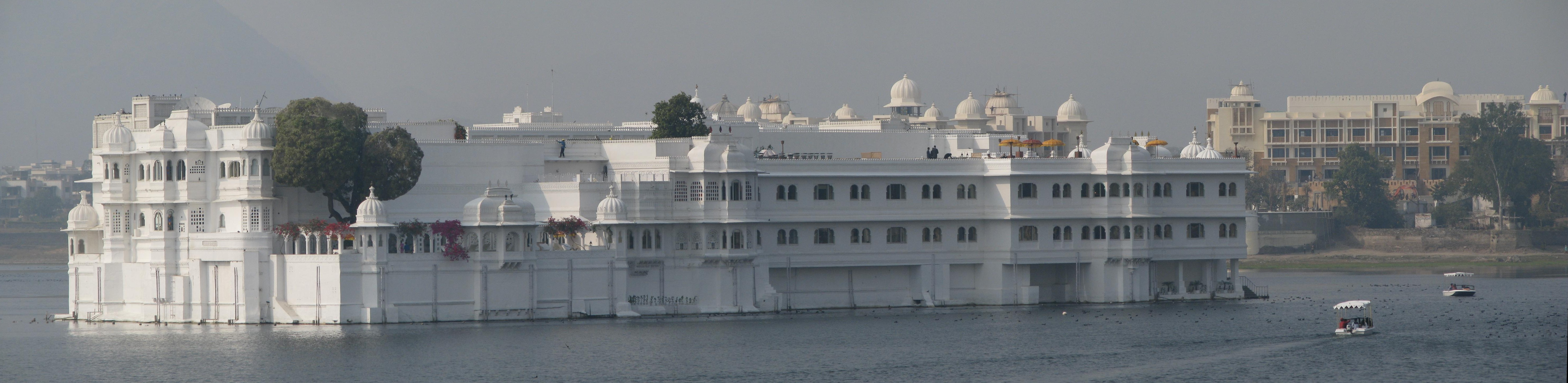
Lake Palace on Lake Pichola, Udaipur, India.

The palace was used to film several movies:

- 1959: Fritz Lang's The Tiger of Eschnapur and The Indian Tomb as palace of Chandra, the maharajah of the fictitious town of Eshnapur.
- 1983: the James Bond film Octopussy, as the home of titular character Octopussy (played by Maud Adams). It was also shot in the other palaces of Udaipur: Jag Mandir and Monsoon Palace.

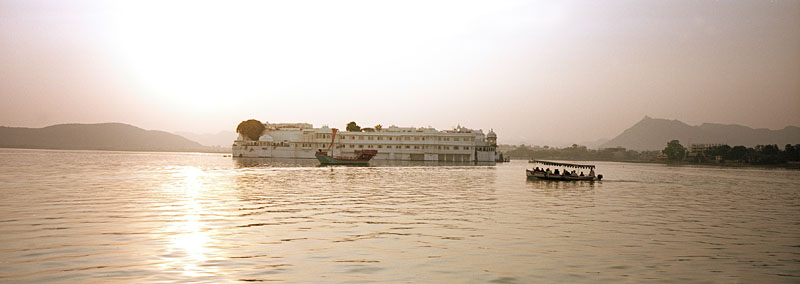
Lake Palace Hotel

== Literature ==
- Crump, Vivien; Toh, Irene (1996). Rajasthan (hardback). London: Everyman Guides. pp. 400 pages. ISBN 1-85715-887-3.
- Crites, Mitchell Shelby; Nanji, Ameeta (2007). India Sublime – Princely Palace Hotels of Rajasthan (hardback). New York: Rizzoli. pp. 272 pages. ISBN 978-0-8478-2979-8.
- Badhwar, Inderjit; Leong, Susan (2006). India Chic. Singapore: Bolding Books. p. 240. ISBN 981-4155-57-8.
- Michell, George, Martinelli, Antonio (2005). The Palaces of Rajasthan. London: Frances Lincoln. pp. 271 pages. ISBN 978-0-7112-2505-3.
- Preston, Diana & Michael (2007). A Teardrop on the Cheek of Time (Hardback) (First ed.). London: Doubleday. pp. 354 pages. ISBN 978-0-385-60947-0.
- Tillotson, G. H. R (1987). The Rajput Palaces - The Development of an Architectural Style (Hardback) (First ed.). New Haven and London: Yale University Press. pp. 224 pages. ISBN 0-300-03738-4.
- William Warren; Jill Gocher (2007). Asia's Legendary Hotels: The Romance of Travel (hardback). Singapore: Periplus Editions. ISBN 978-0-7946-0174-4.
