= Shambhu Niwas =

Palace in Udaipur

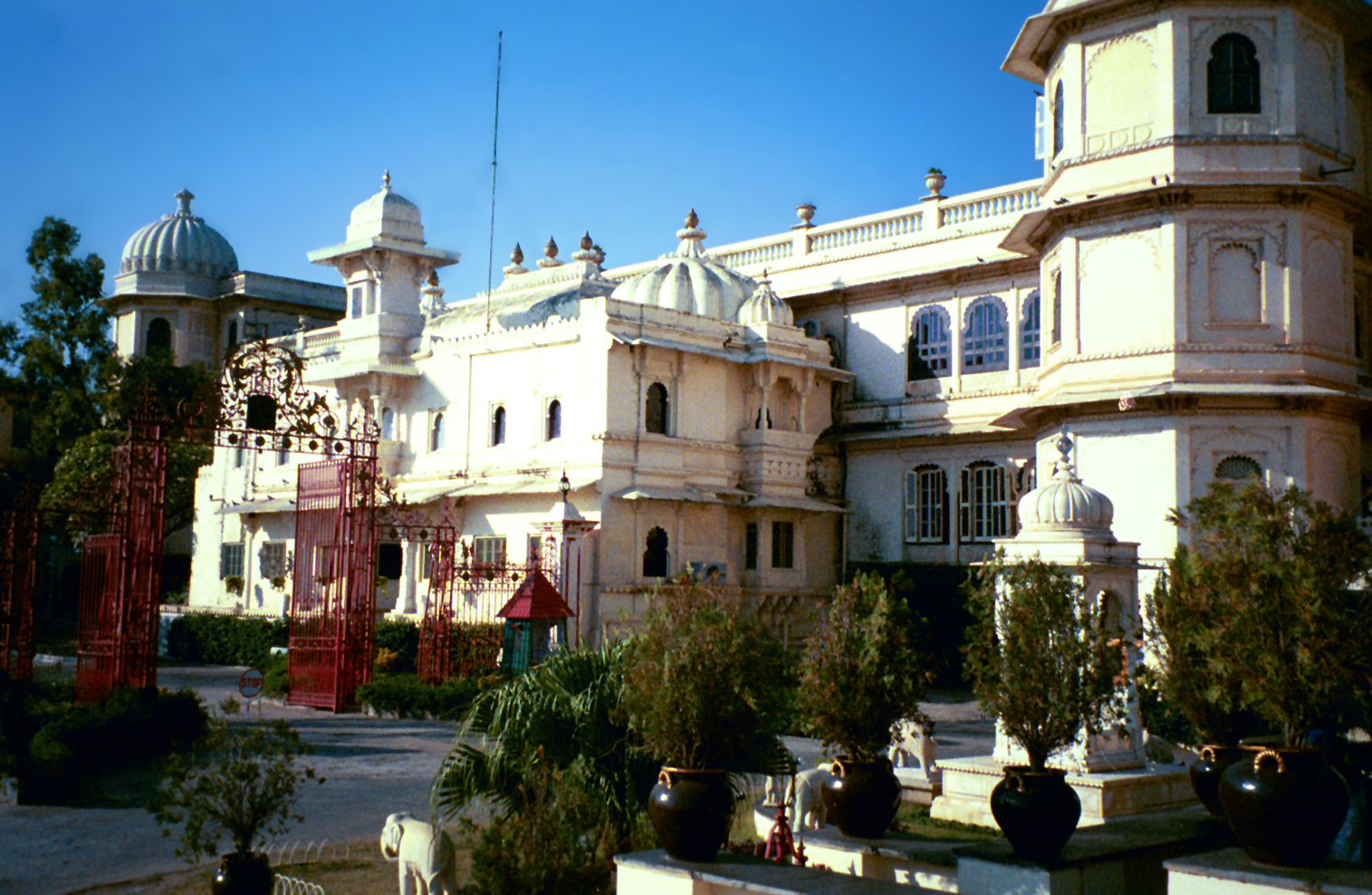
- Shambhu Niwas, Udaipur

General information
- Town or city: Udaipur
- Country: India

Shambhu Niwas is part of the City Palace, Udaipur, and serves as the private residence of the erstwhile royal family of Udaipur.

== Description ==
It was built in the 1870s during the reign of Shambhu Singh, the Maharana of Udaipur. It was designed as a modern European-style villa by an English architect. It covers an area of 5,000 sq. m. and is part of the City Palace complex in Udaipur. Shambu Singh entrusted Pannalal Mehta with the responsibility of overseeing and expediting its construction. When it was completed, he gifted Pannalal a golden langar (transl. an ornament worn around the anklet).

Furniture made from Belgian crystal was originally purchased for it by Sajjan Singh but was later moved to Shiv Niwas Palace on the orders of Fateh Singh. It contains numerous paintings, crystal chandeliers, objets d'art, and furniture from around the world.

Pierre Loti described it as "... modern, with European drawing-rooms, looking-glasses, sideboards laden with silver, and billiard-rooms, appointments which we had been far from expecting to see in so indigenous a town."

== Usage ==
It now serves as the private residence of the erstwhile royal family of Udaipur.
