= City Palace, Udaipur =

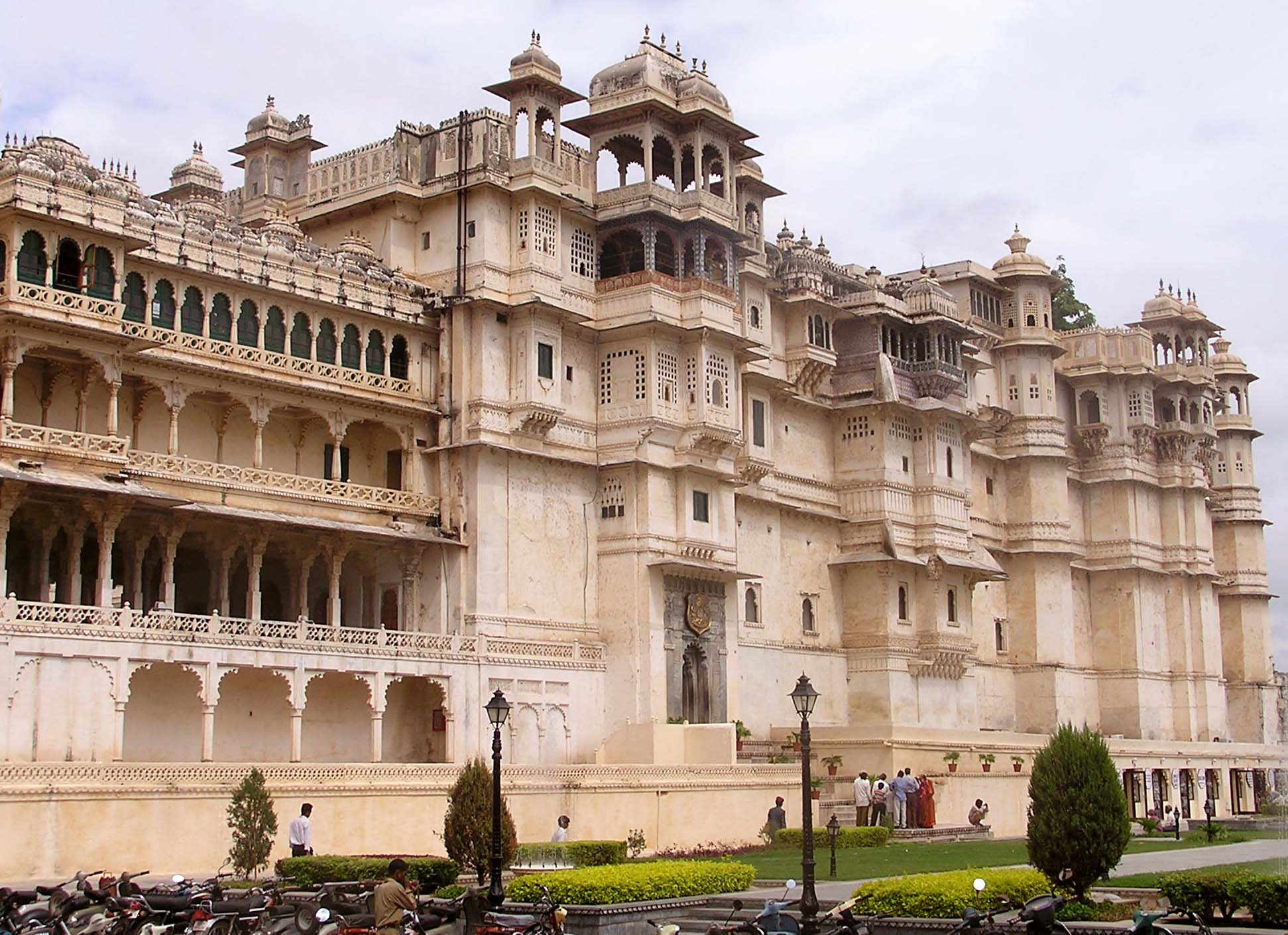
- Exterior of the palace in 2006

- Location within Rajasthan

General information
- Architectural style: Rajput Architecture
- Location: Udaipur, India
- Coordinates: 24.576°N 73.683°E
- Construction started: 1559
- Completed: 16th century
- Owner: The Maharana Of Mewar Charitable Foundation (MMCF) HRH Group of Hotels Pvt. Ltd. Lakshyaraj Singh Mewar(in possession) and Vishvaraj Singh Mewar(claimant)

Technical details
- Structural system: Marble and masonry

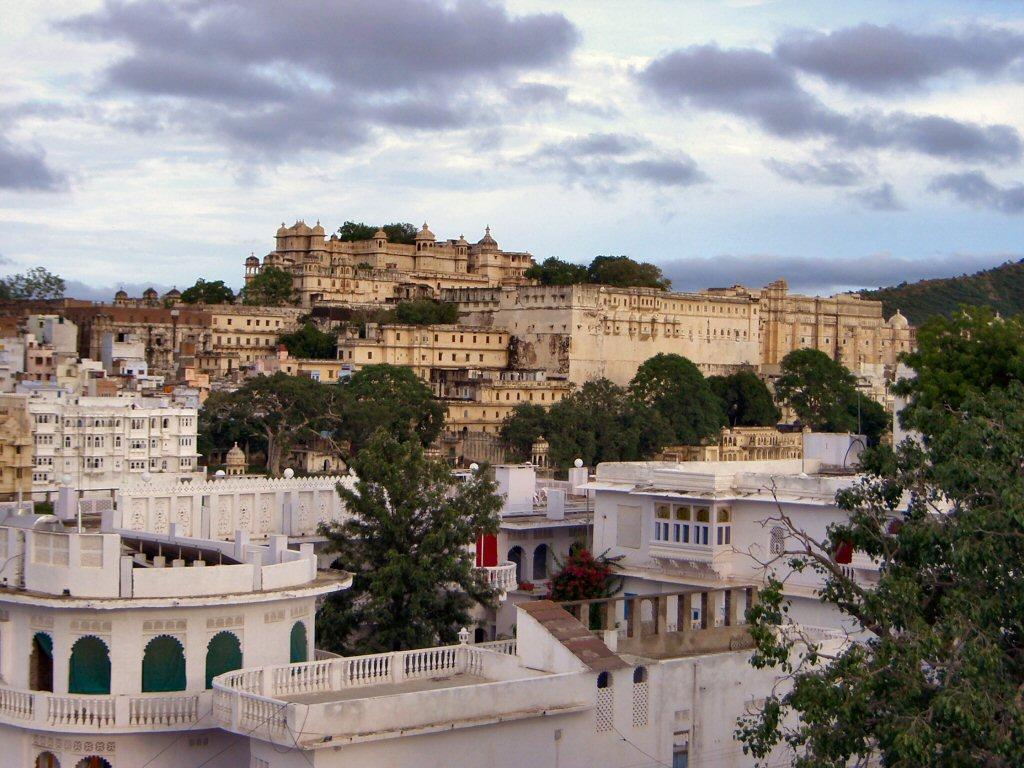
Full view of the City Palace complex

City Palace (Raj Mahal), Udaipur is a palace complex situated in the city of Udaipur in the Indian state of Rajasthan. It was built over a period of nearly 400 years, with contributions from several rulers of the Mewar dynasty. Its construction began in 1553, started by Maharana Udai Singh II of the Sisodia Rajput family as he shifted his capital from the erstwhile Chittor to the newfound city of Udaipur. The palace is located on the east bank of Lake Pichola and has several palaces built within its complex.

The City Palace in Udaipur was built in a flamboyant style and is considered the largest of its type in the state of Rajasthan. It was built atop a hill, in a fusion of the Rajasthani Rajput architecture providing a panoramic view of the city and its surroundings. Overlooking Lake Pichola, several historic monuments like the Lake Palace, Jag Mandir, Jagdish Temple, Monsoon Palace, and Neemach Mata temple, are all in the vicinity of the palace complex. Nestled within the Aravali mountain range, these landmarks are also associated with popular culture.

== History ==
The City Palace was built concurrently with the establishment of the Udaipur city by Maharana Udai Singh II and his successor Maharanas over a period of the next 400 years. The Maharanas lived and administered their kingdom from this palace, thereby making the palace complex an important historic landmark.

The Mewar kingdom was flourished initially in Nagda (30 kilometres (19 mi) to the north of Udaipur), established in 568 AD by Guhil, the first Maharana of Mewar. In the 8th century, the capital was moved to Chittor, a hilltop fort from where the Sisodias ruled for 800 years. Maharana Udai Singh II inherited the Mewar kingdom at Chittor in 1537 but by that time there were signs of losing control of the fort in wars with the Mughals. Udai Singh II, therefore, chose the site near Lake Pichola for his new kingdom as the location was well protected on all sides by forests, lakes and the Aravalli hills. He had chosen this site for his new capital, much before the sacking of Chittor by Emperor Akbar, on the advice of a hermit he had met during one of his hunting expeditions.

The earliest royal structure he built here was the Royal courtyard or 'Rai Angan', which was the beginning of the building of the City Palace complex. The court was built at the location where the hermit had advised Maharana to build his new capital.

After Udai Singh's death in 1572, his son Maharana Pratap took the reins of power at Udaipur. Later, in the famous Battle of Haldighati, which ended in stalemate against the Mughal Emperor Akbar in the year 1576. After the death of Maharana Pratap, Amar Singh I took the reins of power at Udaipur.

But with the increasing Marathas attacks by 1761, Udaipur and the Mewar state were in dire straits and in ruins. By 1818, Maharana Bhim Singh signed a treaty with the British accepting their protection against the other empires. After the Indian independence in 1947, the Mewar Kingdom, along with other princely states of Rajasthan, merged with the democratic India, in 1949. The Mewar Kings subsequently also lost their special royal privileges and titles. The successive Maharanas, however, retained their ownership of the palaces in Udaipur and converted parts of the palace complex into heritage hotels.

In November 2024, clashes broke out outside the palace after Vishvaraj Singh Mewar, the ceremonially anointed 77th Maharana of Mewar on 25 November 2024 at chittorgarh fort after the death of his father Mahendra Singh Mewar, was prevented from entering the complex by his estranged uncle, Arvind Singh Mewar, who manages the trust running the estate.

== Architecture ==
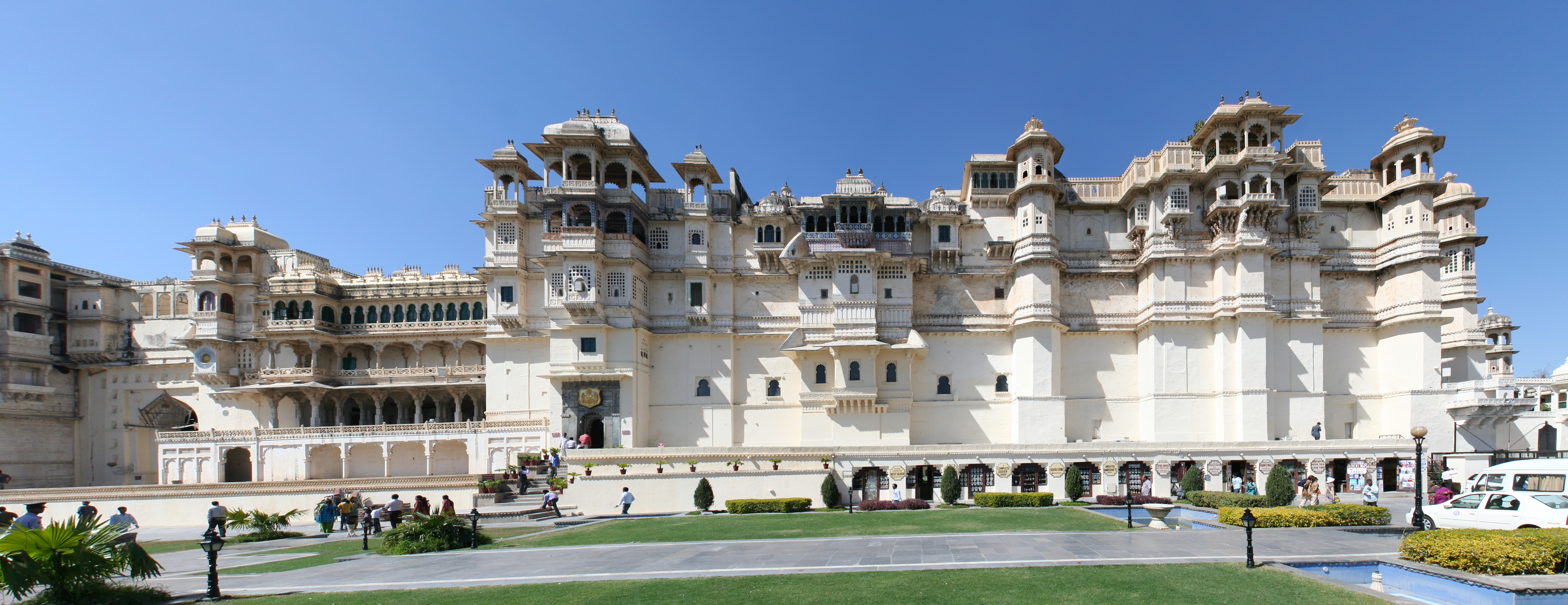
The facade of Udaipur City Palace

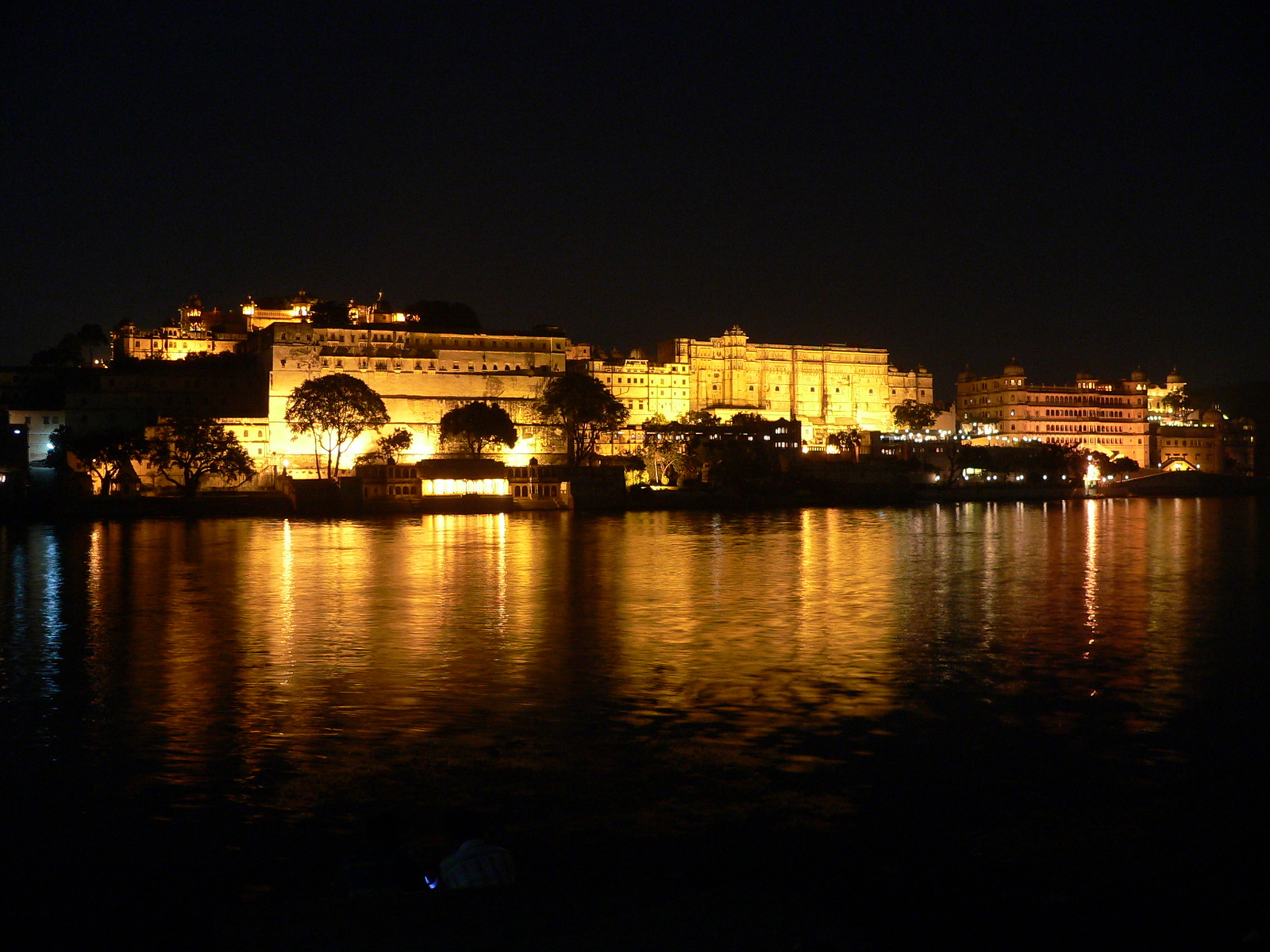
Panoramic view of the Udaipur City Palace Complex at night

The series of palaces in the city palace complex, behind an exquisite facade of 244 metres (801 ft) length and 30.4 metres (100 ft) height, were built on a ridge on the east of lake Pichola. The complex is located in Udaipur city at 24.576°N 73.68°E, which is set with an average elevation of 598 metres (1,962 ft). They were built over a long period, from 1559 onwards, by 22 generations of Sisodia Rajputs. Several Maharanas starting with Udai Singh II, have contributed to this edifice, which comprises an agglomeration of structures, including 11 small separate palaces. The unique aspect of this conglomeration is that the architectural design is distinctly homogeneous. The palace complex has been built entirely in granite and marble. The interiors of the palace complex with its balconies, towers and cupolas exhibit delicate mirror-work, marble-work, murals, wall paintings, silver-work, inlay-work and leftover of colored glass. The complex provides a view of the lake and the Udaipur city from its upper terraces.

The palaces within the complex are interlinked through a number of chowks or quadrangles with zigzag corridors, planned in this fashion to avoid surprise attacks by enemies. Erected in the complex, after entering through the main Tripolia (triple) gate, are the Suraj Gokhda (public address facade), the Mor-chowk (Peacock courtyard), the Dilkhush Mahal (heart's delight), the Surya Chopar, the Sheesh Mahal (Palace of glass and mirrors), the Moti Mahal (Palace of Pearls), the Krishna Vilas (named after Lord Krishna), Shambu Niwas (royal residence now), the Bhim Vilas, the Amar Vilas (with a raised garden) that faces the Badi Mahal (the big palace), the Fateprakash Palace and the Shiv Niwas Palace; the last two have been converted into heritage hotels. The complex is set with facilities of a post office, bank, travel agency, numerous craft shops and also an Indian boutique belonging to the World Wildlife Fund (WWF). The entire complex is the property of the Mewar royal family with various trusts maintaining the structures.

== Structures within the complex ==
Gateways

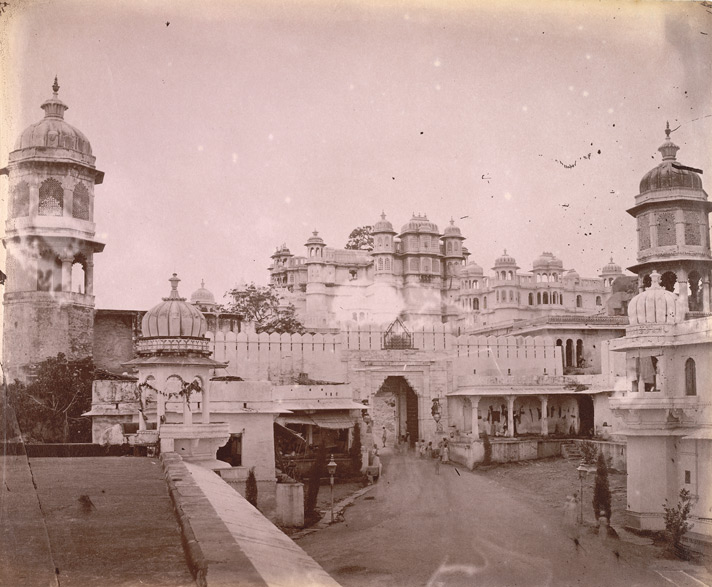
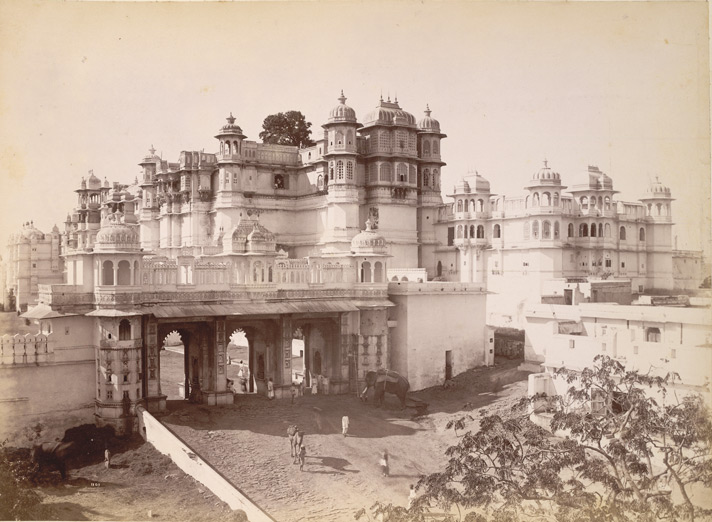
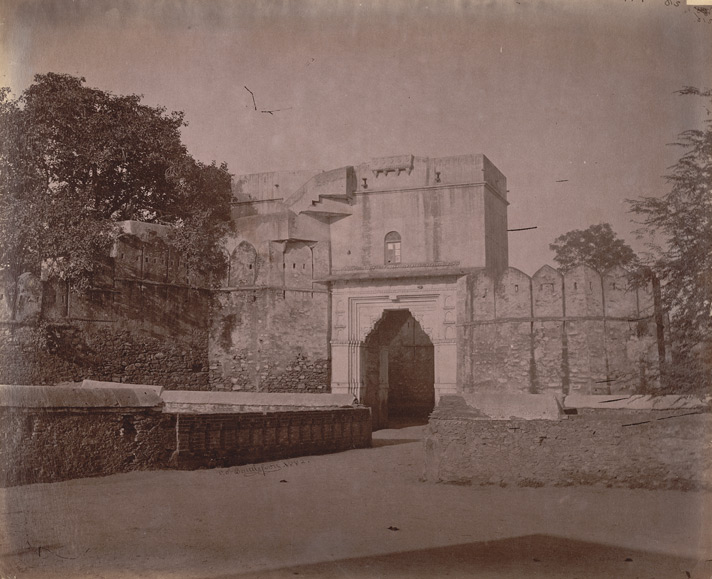
Entrance gateway Badi Pol (left) to City Palace, Tripolia (Triple) Gate (centre), Hathi Pol (Elephant Gate) (right)

Gateways, colloquially called Pols, are set to the east of Udaipur city. A number of such gateways provide access to the palace complex.

The main entry from the city is through the 'Badi Pol' (Great Gate), which leads to the first courtyard. Badi Pol (built in 1600) leads to the ‘Tripolia Pol', a triple-arched gate built in 1725, which provides the northern entry. The road between this gate and the palace is lined with shops and kiosks owned by craftsmen, book-binders, miniature painters and textile dealers. Between these two gates, eight marble arches or Toranas are erected. It is said that the Maharanas used to be weighed here with gold and silver, which was then distributed among the local people. Following the Tripolia gate is an arena in front of the Toran Pol and the facade palace, the Manak Chowk, where elephant fights were staged in the past to test their prowess before starting on war campaigns.

The main block of the city palace is approached through a modest door from the Ganesha Deodhi terrace. The door is flanked by whitewashed walls vibrantly painted with martial animals in the traditional Rajput style. There is a big boulders in the entry where elephants were tied. This elephant parking has now become car parking.

Behind the entrance of Badi Pol there is a huge wall which was for the elephant fight. The elephant which touches the wall first would be considered weak elephant. Both elephants would pull each other in this fight.

Amar Vilas

Amar Vilas is the uppermost court inside the complex, which is an elevated garden. It provides entry to the Badi Mahal. It was built in Mughal style as a pleasure pavilion. It has cusped arcades enclosing a square marble tub. Amar Vilas is the highest point of the City Palace and has wonderful hanging gardens with fountains, towers, and terraces.

Badi Mahal

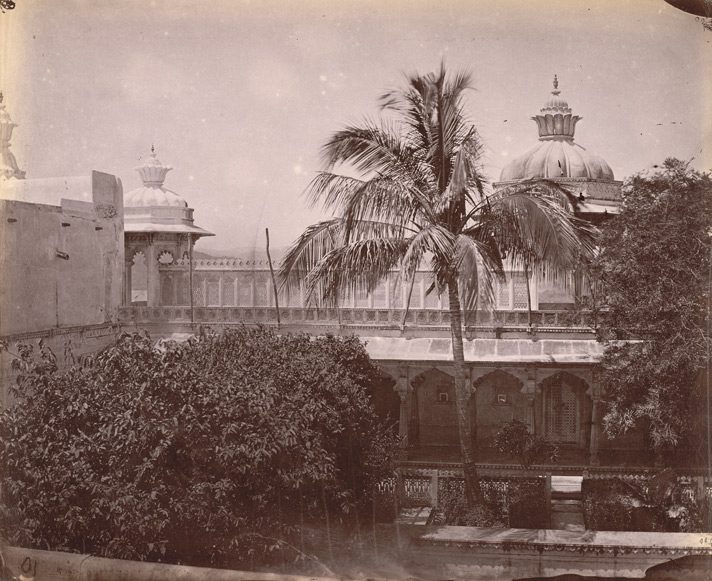
Badi Mahal

Badi Mahal (Great Palace) also known as Garden Palace is the central palace situated on a 27 metres (89 ft) high natural rock formation bis-a-bis the rest of the palace. The rooms on the ground floor appear to be at the level of the fourth floor in view of the height difference to its surrounding buildings. There is a swimming pool here, which was then used for Holi festival (festival of colors) celebration. In an adjoining hall, miniature paintings of 18th and 19th centuries are displayed. In addition, wall paintings of Jag Mandir (as it appeared in the 18th century), Vishnu of Jagdish temple, the very courtyard and an elephant fight scene are depicted.

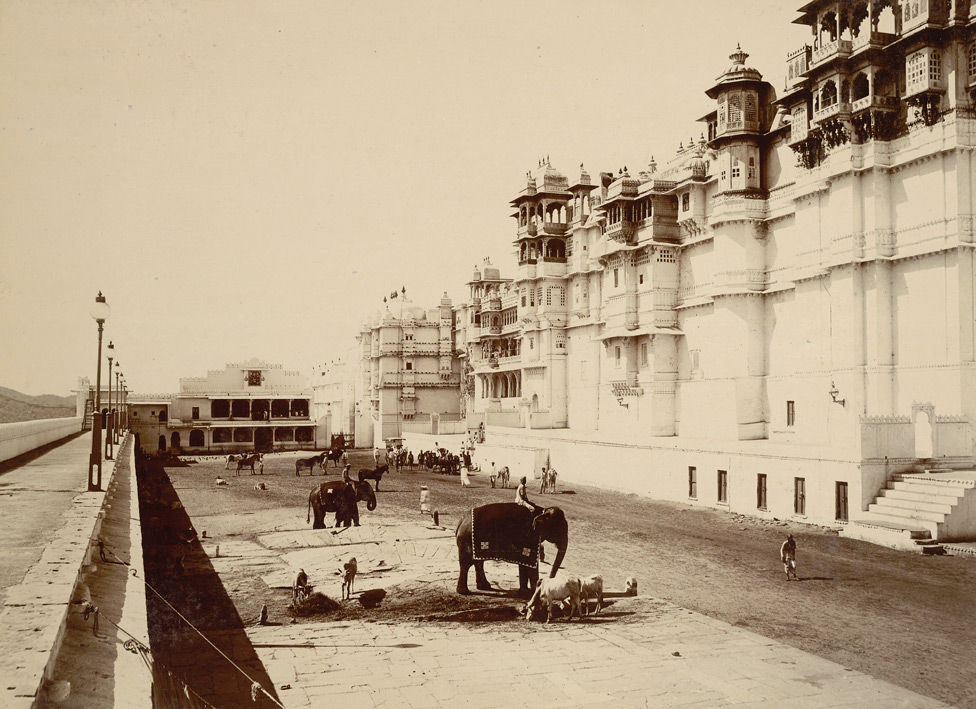
Elephants fights arranged in this venue

Bhim Vilas

Bhim Vilas has a gallery of a collection of miniature paintings that depict the real-life stories of Radha-Krishna.

Chini Chitrashala

Chini Chitrashala (Chinese art place) depicts Chinese and Dutch ornamental tiles.

Choti Chitrashali

Choti Chitrashali or 'Residence of Little Pictures', built in the early 19th century, has pictures of peacocks.

Dilkhusha Mahal

Dilkhusha Mahal or ‘Palace of Joy’ was built in 1620.

Durbar Hall

Durbar Hall was built in 1909 within the Fatehpraksh Palace as a venue for official functions such as State banquets and meetings. The gallery of the hall was used by the Royal ladies to observe the Durbar proceedings. This hall has a luxuriant interior with large chandeliers. Weapons of the maharanas and some of their portraits are depicted here. The foundation stone for this hall was laid by Lord Minto, the Viceroy of India, in 1909, during the rule of Maharana Fateh Singh and was then called Minto Hall.

Fateprakash Palace

Fateprakash Palace, which is now a luxury hotel, has a crystal gallery that consists of crystal chairs, dressing tables, sofas, tables, chairs and beds, crockery, table fountains which were never used. There is also a jewel studded carpet here. Maharana Sajjan Singh had ordered these rare items in 1877 from F& C Osler & Co of London but he died before they arrived here. It is said that the packages containing these crystals remained unopened for 110 years.

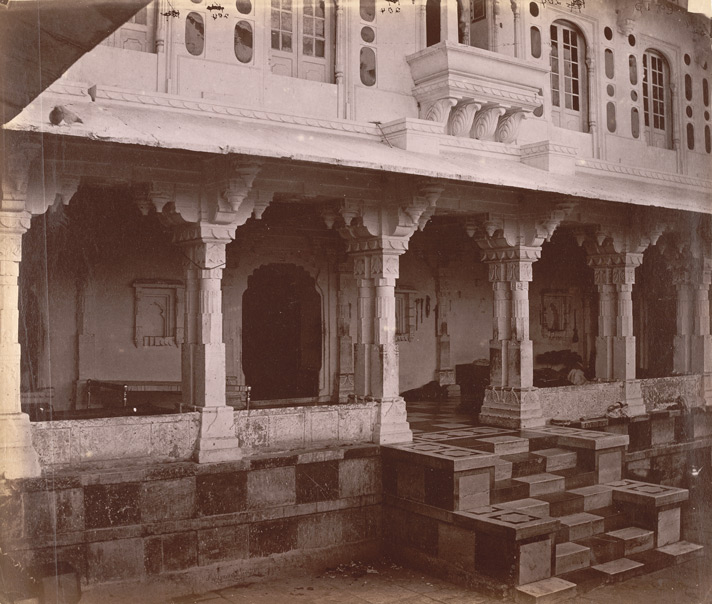
Royal Angan the first structure built by Maharana uday Singh

Krishna Vilas

Krishna Vilas is another chamber, which has a rich collection of miniature paintings that portray royal processions, festivals and games of the Maharanas.

Laxmi Vilas chowk

Laxmi Vilas Chowk is an art gallery with a distinctive collection of Mewar paintings.

Manak Mahal

The Manak Mahal approached from the Manak Chowk is an enclosure for formal audience for the Mewar rulers. It has a raised alcove inlaid completely in mirror glass. Sun-face emblems, in gleaming brass, religious insignia of the Sisodia dynasty are a recurring display at several locations in the City Palace with one being depicted on the façade of the Manak Chowk. The largest of such an emblem is also seen on the wall of the Surya Chopar, a reception centre at the lower level. Surya or Sun emblem of the Mewar dynasty depicts a Bhil, the Sun, Chittor Fort and a Rajput with an inscription in Sanskrit of a quotation from the Bhagavad Gita (Hindu holy scripture), which means "God Helps those who do their duty". It was customary for the Maharanas to offer obeisance to the Sun facing east, every morning before taking breakfast.

Mor Chowk

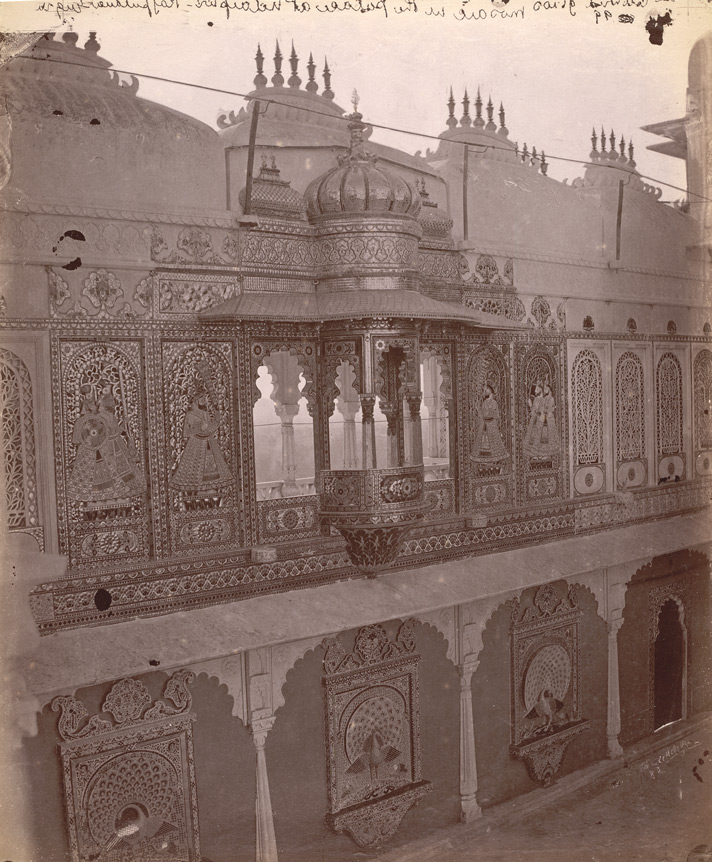
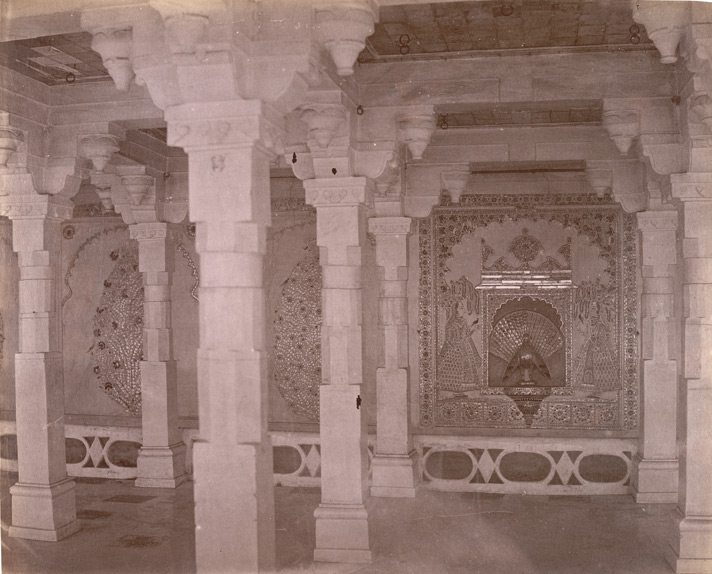
Left:Three peacocks in Mor Chowk wall. Right: Pillared hall with glass and mirror mosaic decorations

Mor Chowk or Peacock square is integral to the inner courts of the palace. The elaborate design of this chamber consists of three peacocks (representing the three seasons of summer, winter, and monsoon) modeled in high relief and faced with coloured glass mosaic, built into successive niches in the wall area or jharoka, These were built during Maharana Sajjan Singh's reign, 200 years after the palace was established. The peacocks have been crafted with 5000 pieces of glass, which shine in green, gold, and blue colours. The apartments in front of the Chowk are depicted with scenes of Hindu god Lord Krishna's legends. At the upper level, there is a projecting balcony, which is flanked by inserts of coloured glass. In an adjoining chamber, called the Kanch-ki-Burj, mosaics of mirrors adorn the walls. The Badi Charur Chowk within this chowk is a smaller court for private use. Its screen wall has painted and inlaid compositions depicting European men and Indian women. Proceeding further from the Mor-Chowk, in the Zenana Mahal or women's quarters exquisitely designed alcoves, balconies, colored windows, tiled walls, and floors are seen.

Rang Bhawan

Rang Bhawan is the palace that used to hold the royal treasure. There are temples of Lord Krishna, Meera Bai and Shiva located here.

Sheesh Mahal

The Sheesh Mahal (Palace of Mirrors) in the City Palace of Udaipur was likely constructed during the reign of Maharana Udai Singh II, who founded Udaipur in 1559. It was later enhanced by successive Maharanas over the centuries.

Museum

In 1974, a part of the city palace and the 'Zenana Mahal' (Ladies Chamber) were converted into a museum. The museum is open for public.

== In popular culture ==
The palace was picturised as a hotel in the 1983 James Bond film Octopussy, where Bond (played by Roger Moore) stayed as he began his quest to apprehend the antagonist Kamal Khan (Louis Jourdan).Octopussy (1983) - Filming & production - IMDb

A 1991 documentary film directed for television by Werner Herzog called Jag Mandir consists of footage of an elaborate theatrical performance for the Maharana Arvind Singh Mewar at the City Palace staged by André Heller.

The palace was used for filming part of Goliyon Ki Raasleela Ram-Leela (English: A Play of Bullets: Ram-Leela) 2013 directed by Sanjay Leela Bhansali. On 15 August 2018, India Post issued a commemorative stamp depicting the Palace.

The palace area of Manak Chowk serves as the venue of the annual Maharana Mewar Foundation Awards, honouring students, national and international personalities.

== Gallery ==
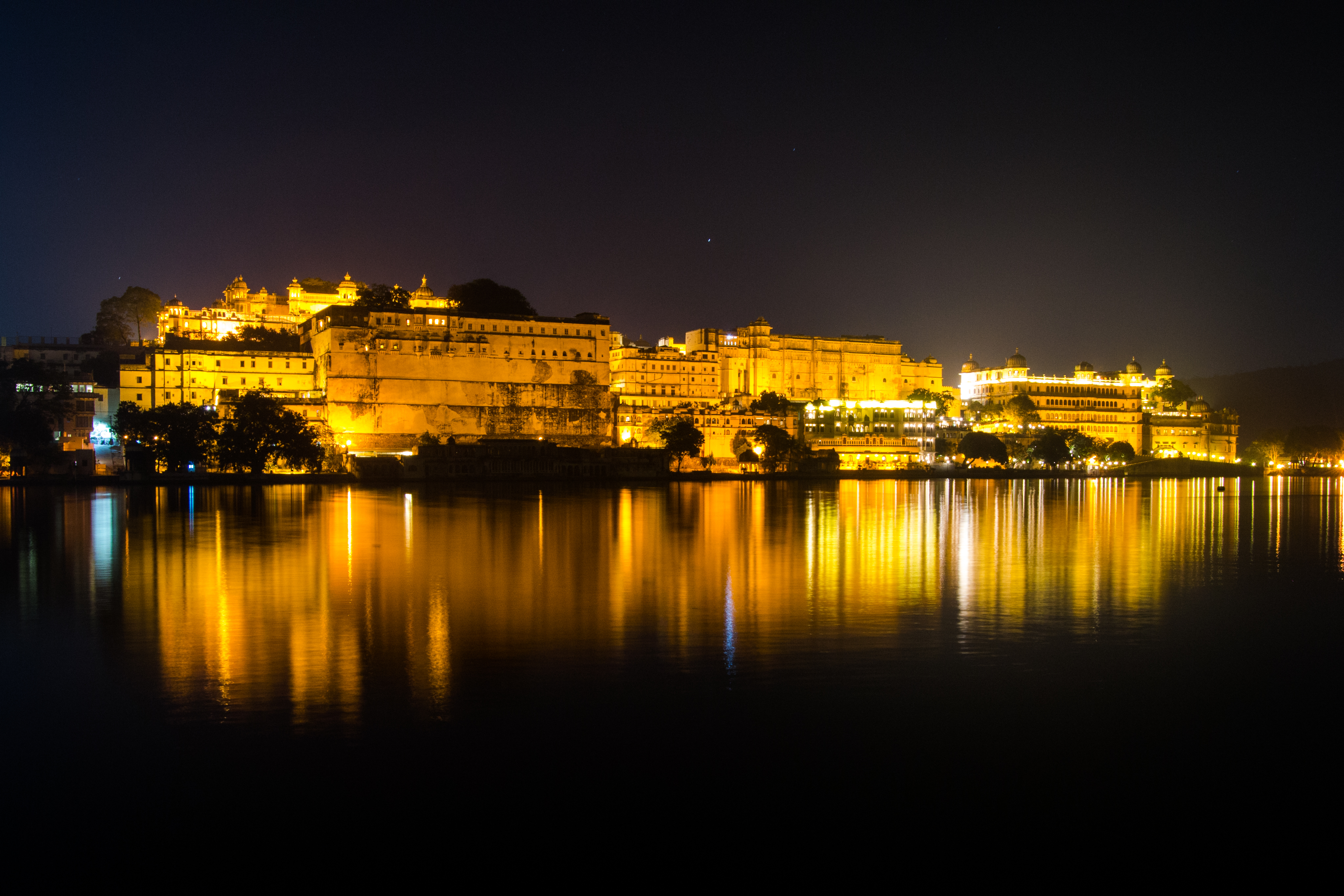
Night view of Udaipur city palace by lake Pichola, a view from Ambrai ghat.

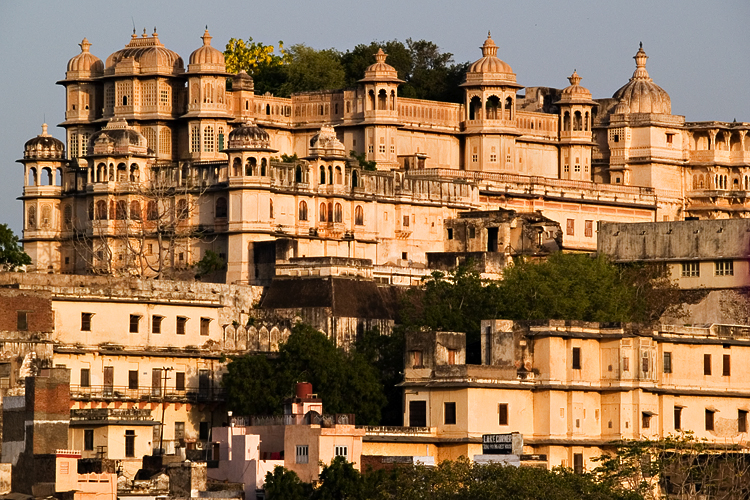
City Palace.

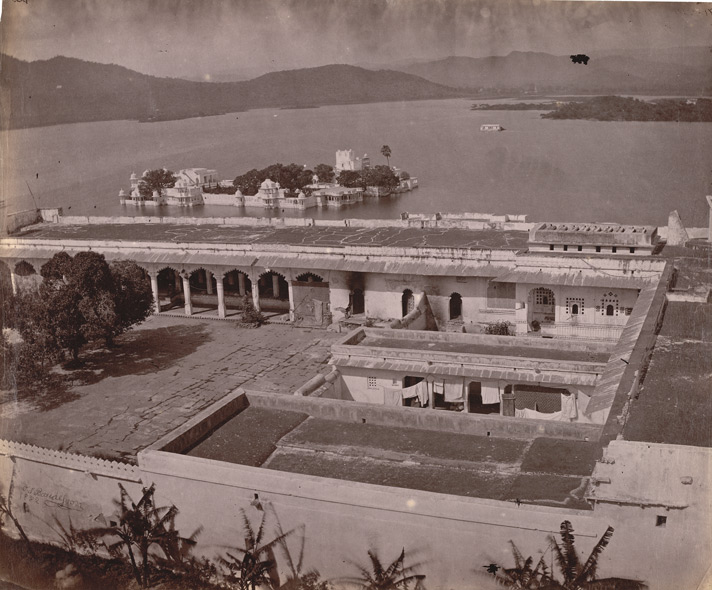
Palace View of courtyards towards Lake Pichola.

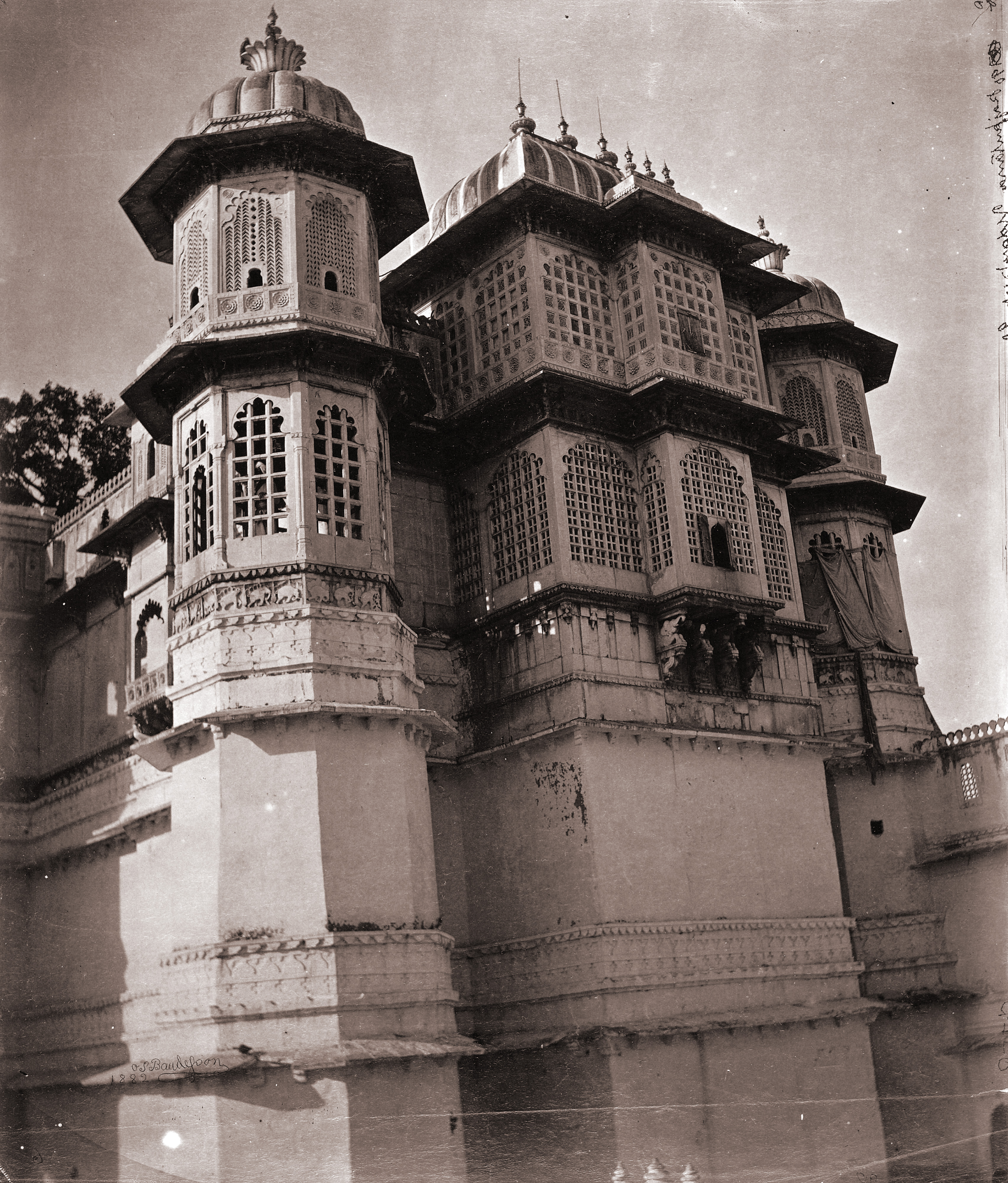
Exterior view of corner of the palace.

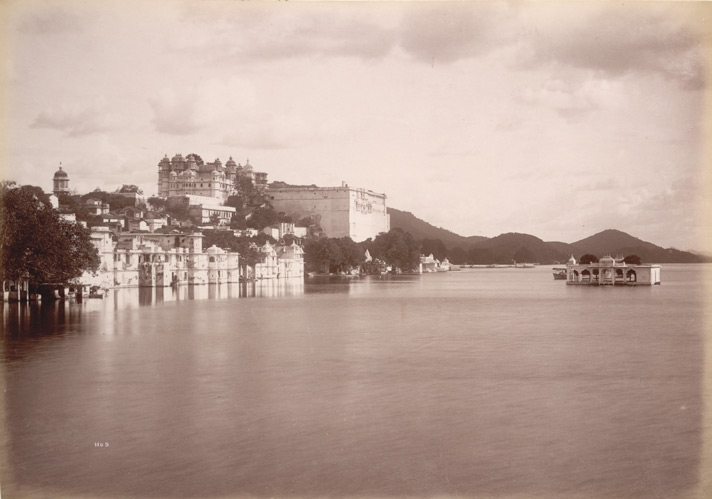
Rear View of the Palace.

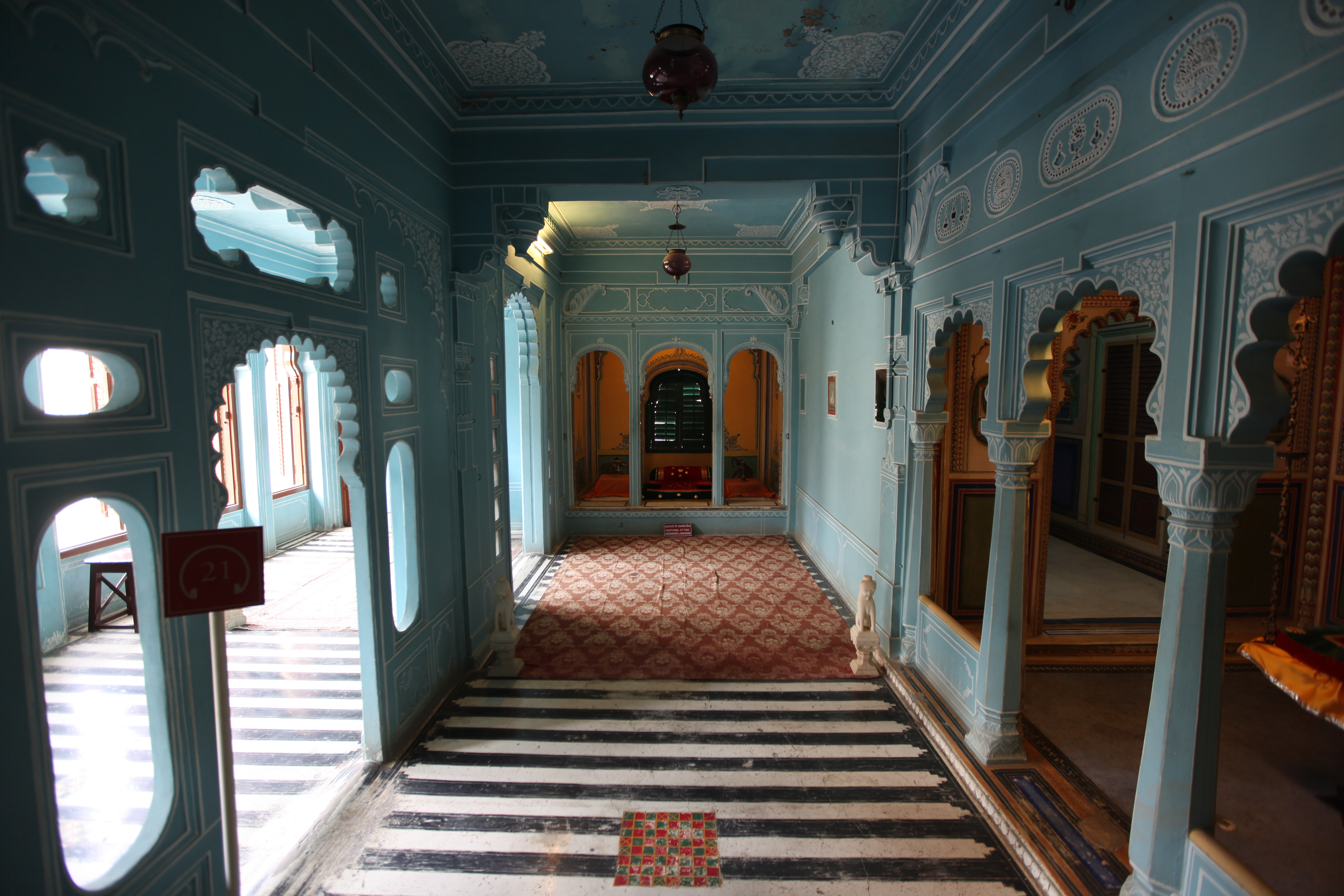
Inside view of City Palace, Udaipur.

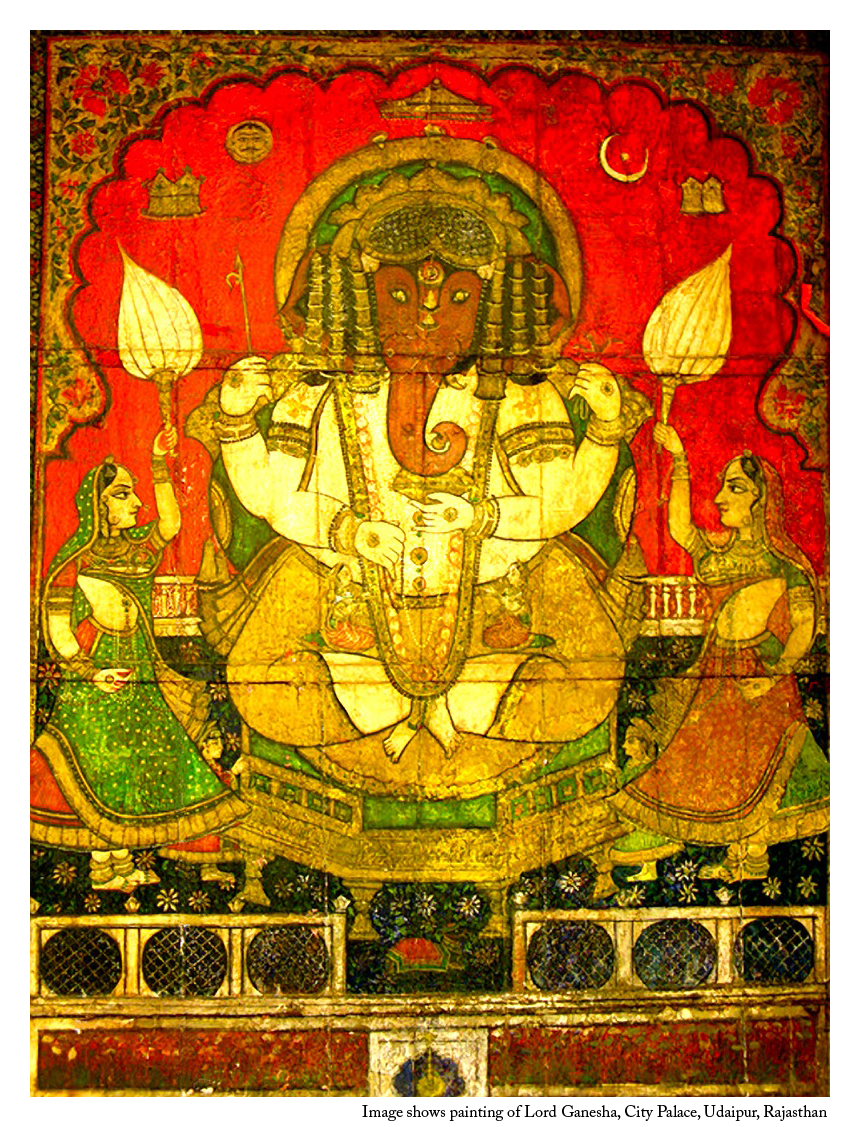
Rajasthani painting of Lord Ganesha, City Palace.

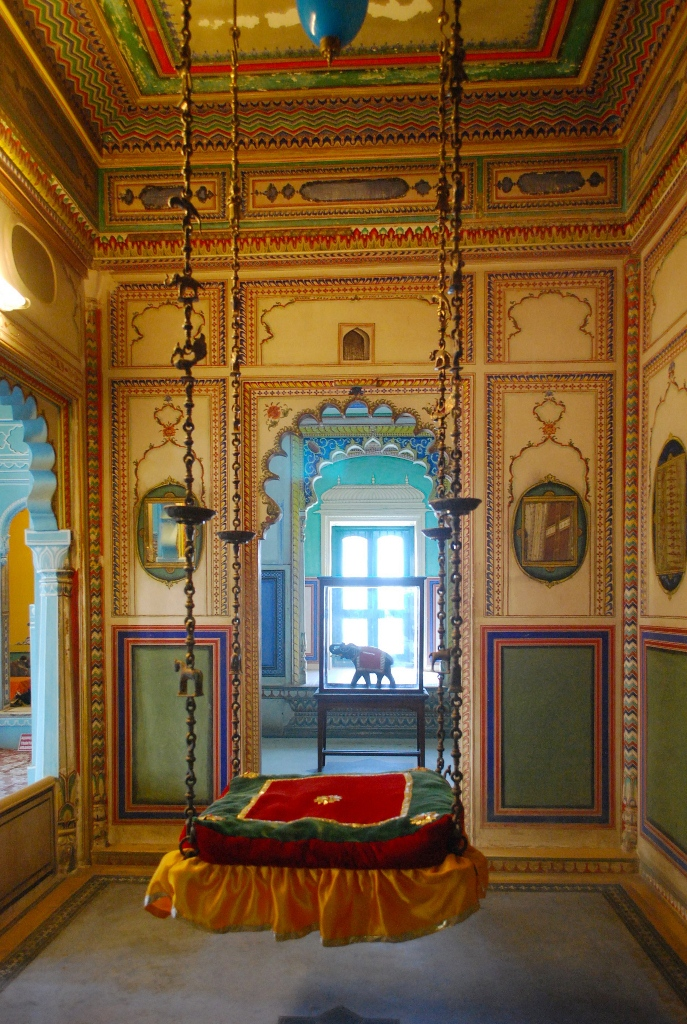
Royal Swing inside the Palace.

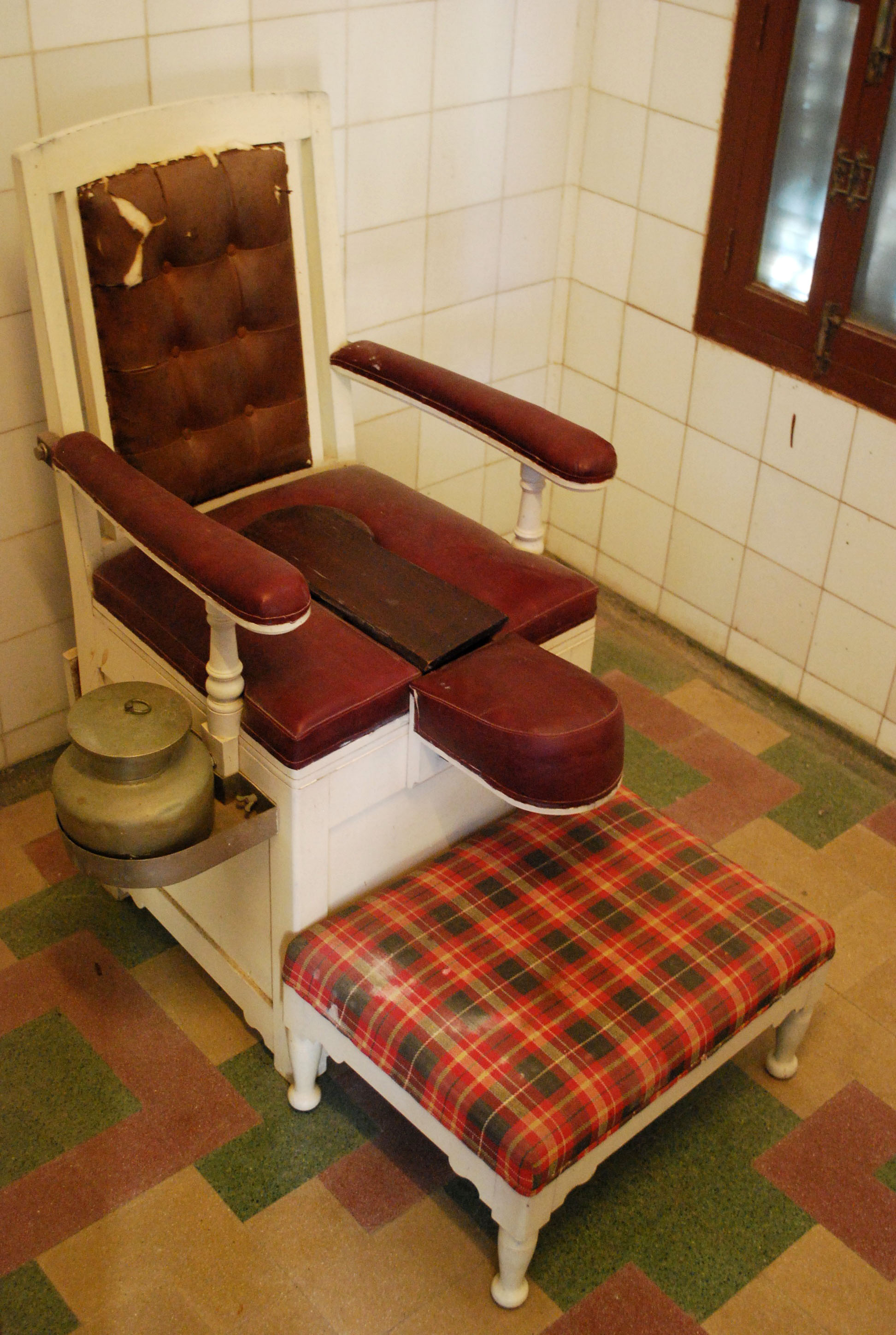
King's Lavatory.

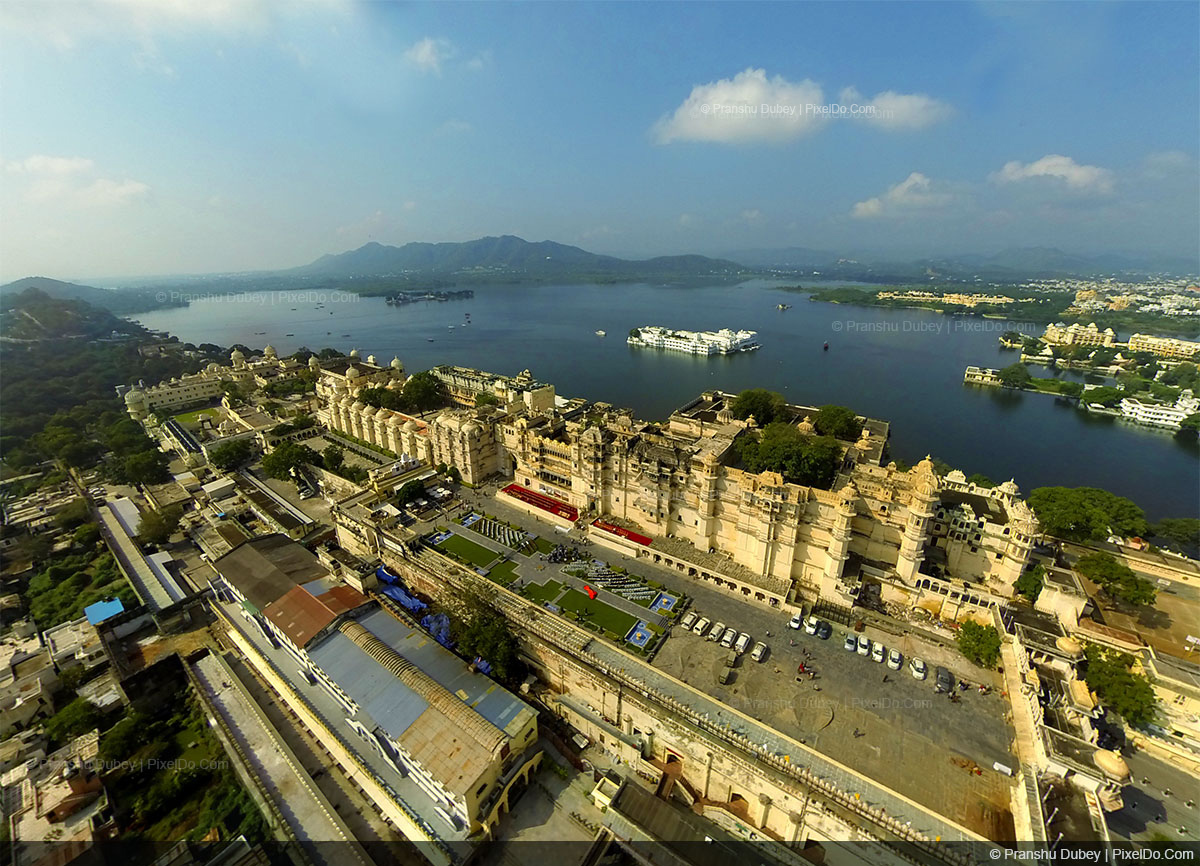
Aerial Photography in India.

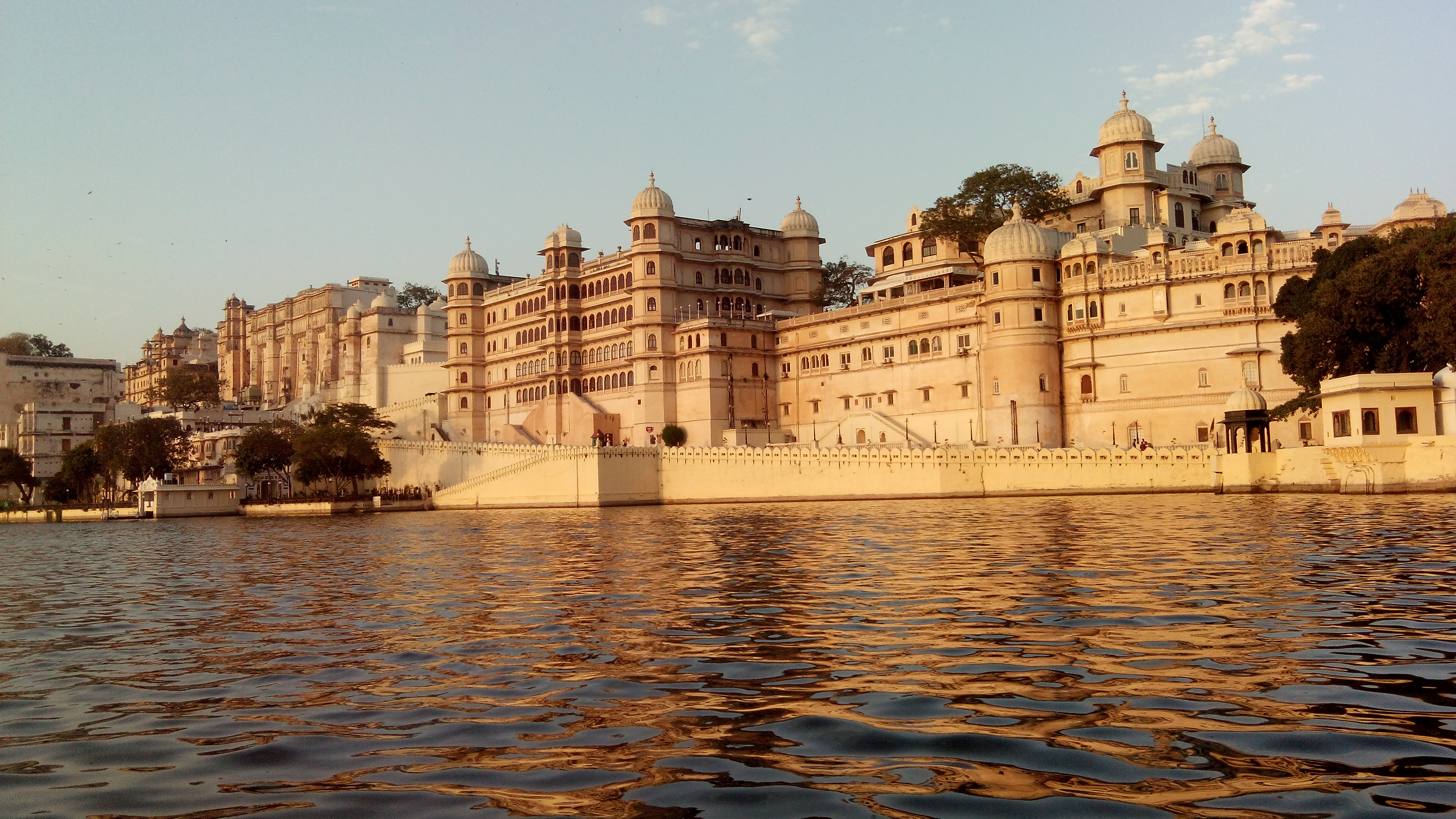
Wide angle view of the City Palace from the backside, also showing Pichola Lake.

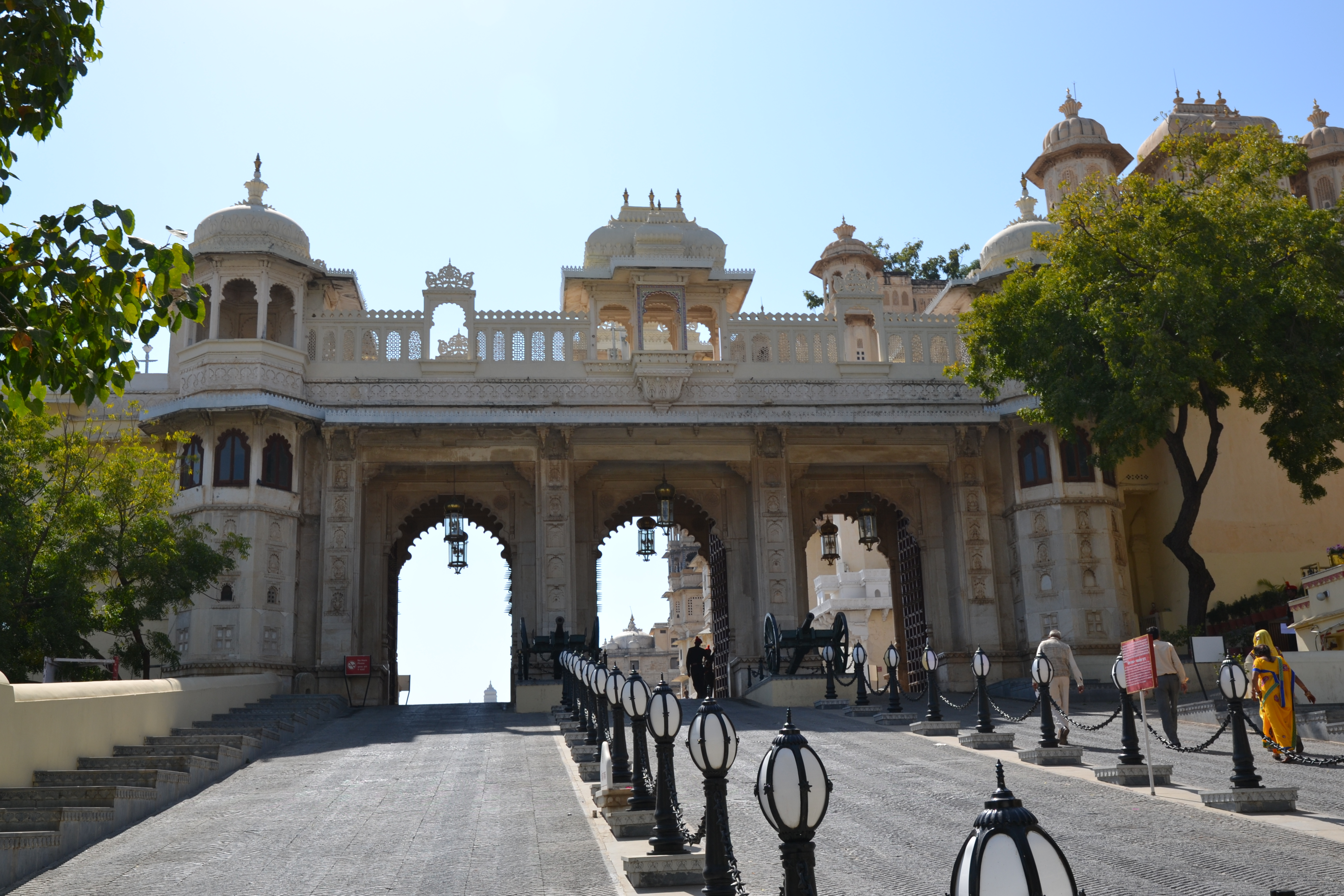
Tripolia Gate from Badi Pol.

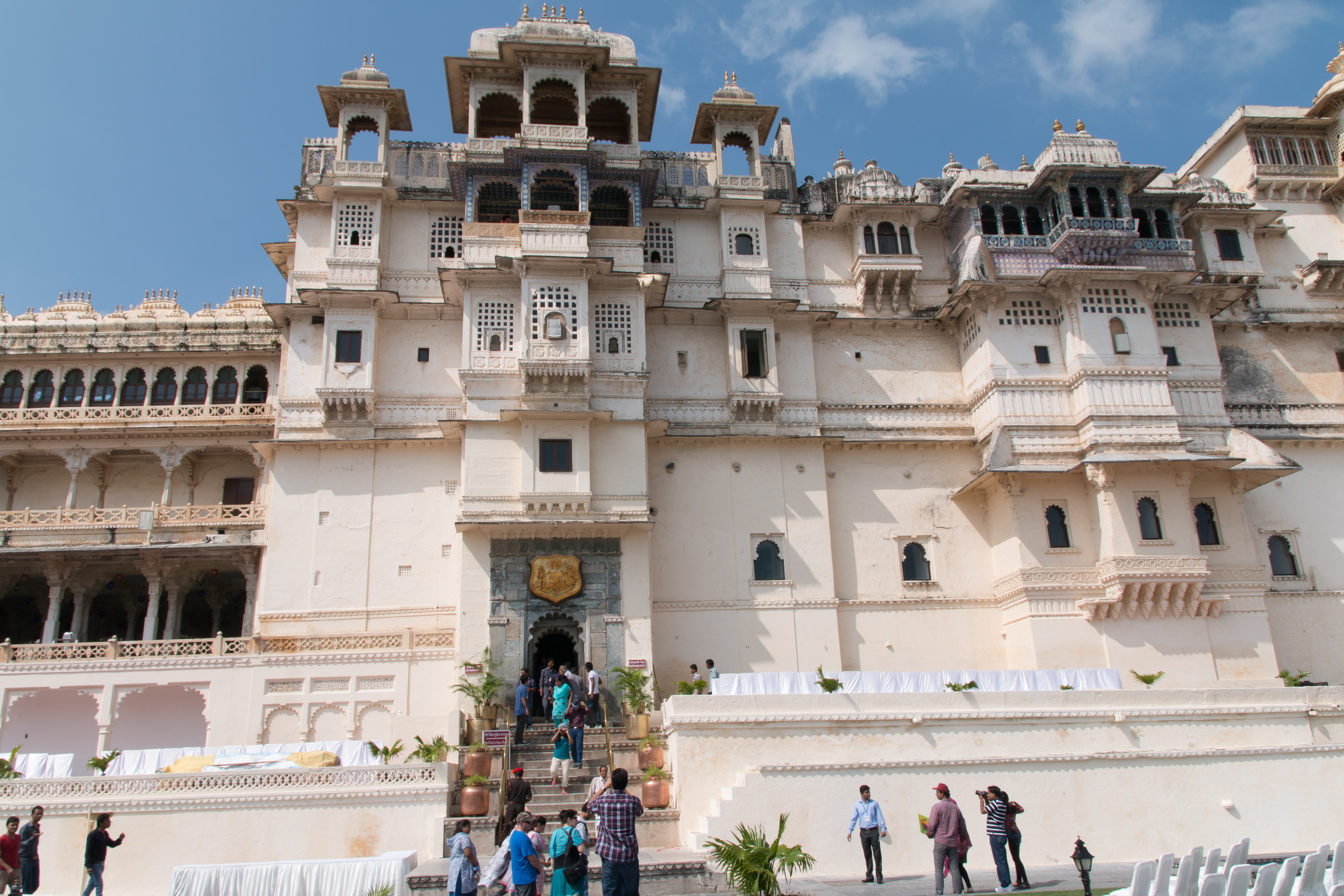
City Palace facade from Manek Chowk.

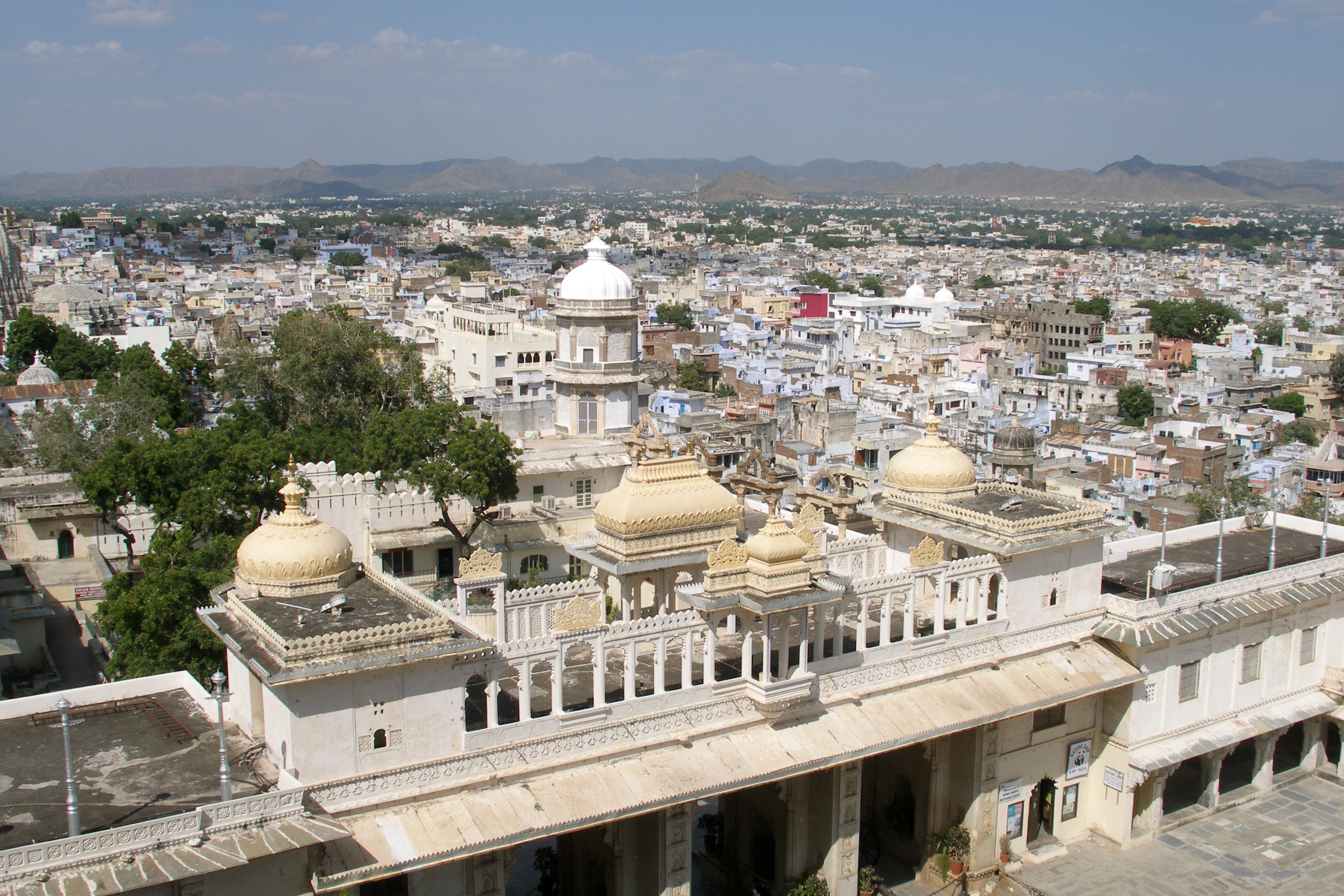
Skyline of Udaipur with Udaipur Palace.

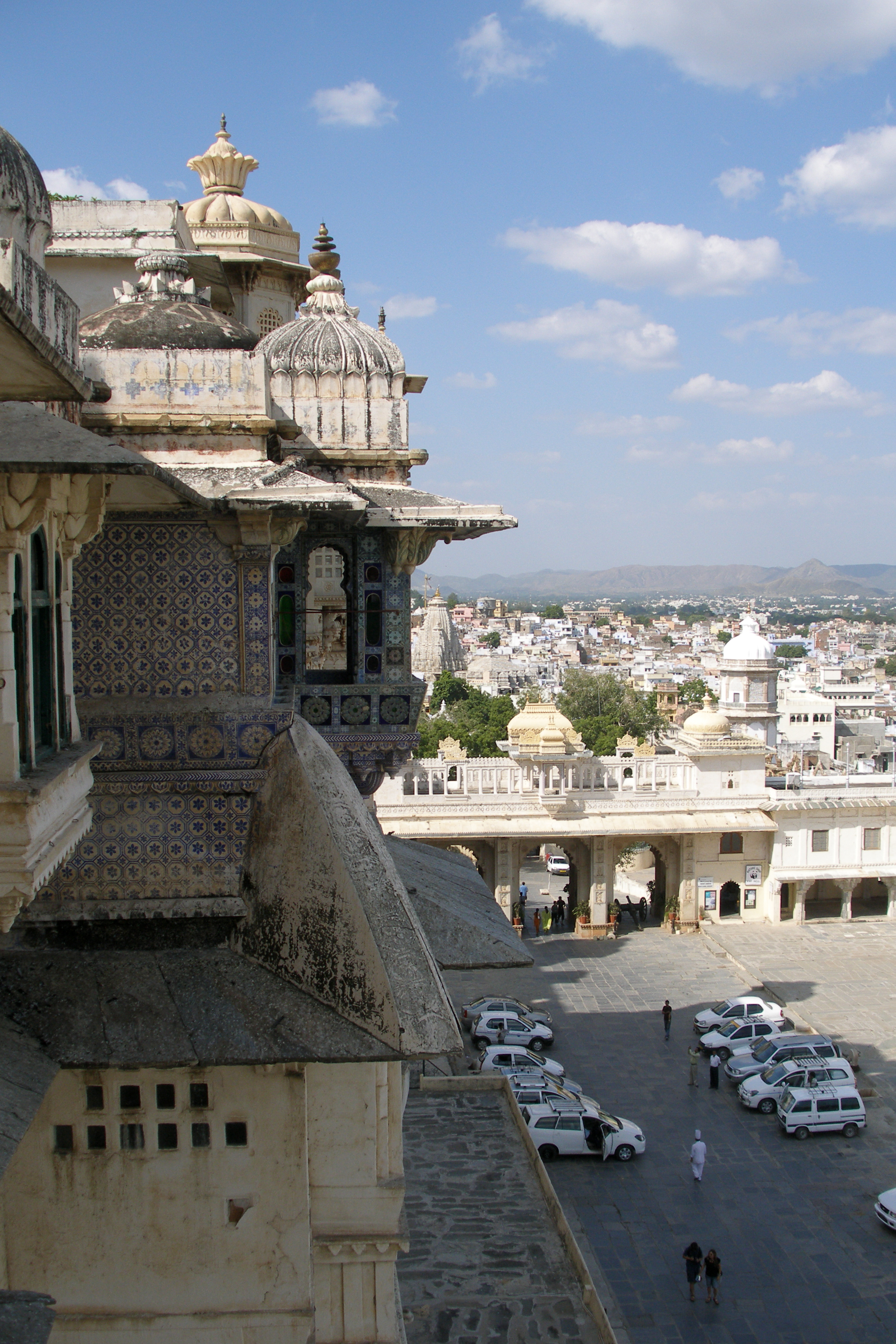
A fusion of the Rajasthani and Mughal architectural styles.

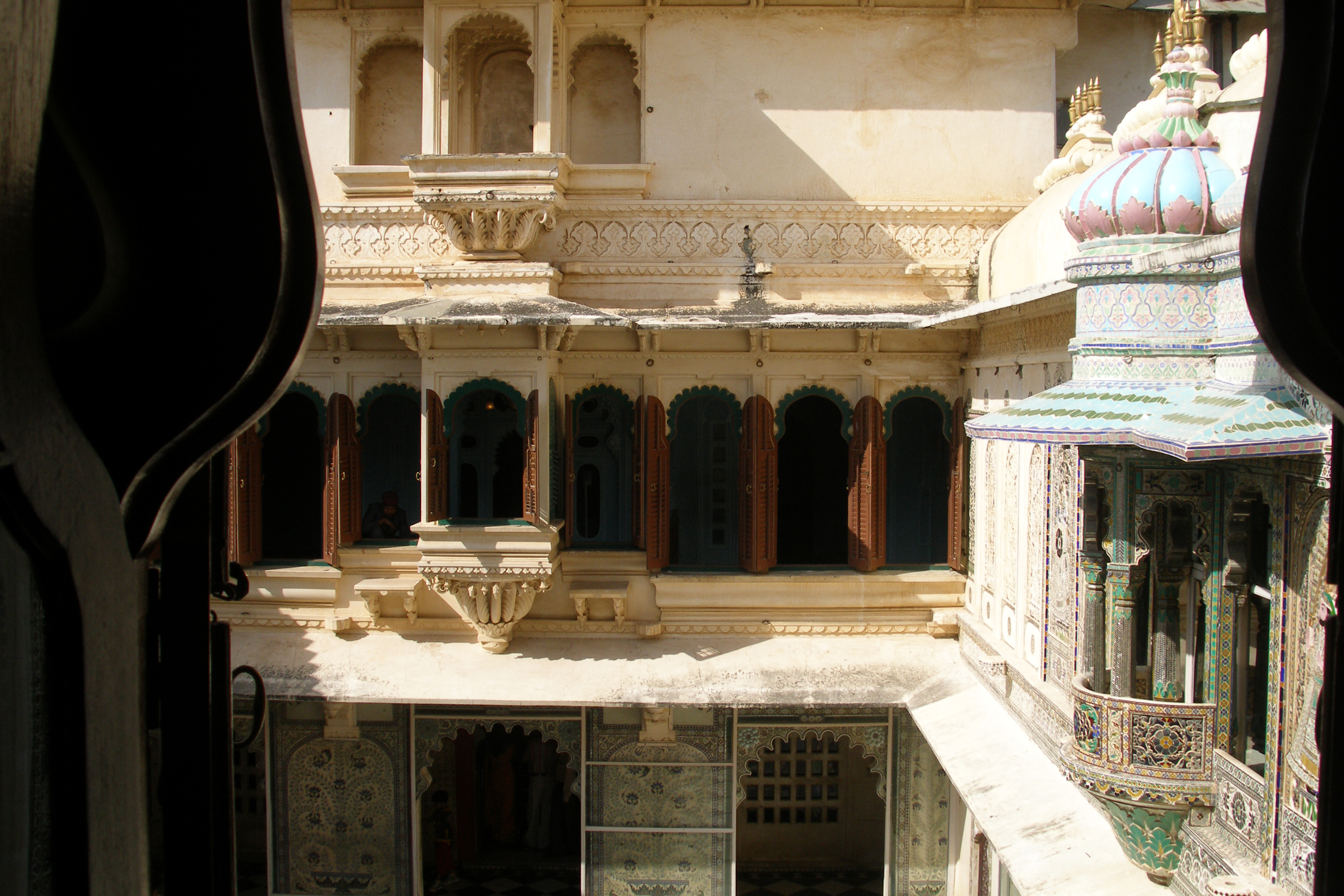
Balconies at the City Palace.

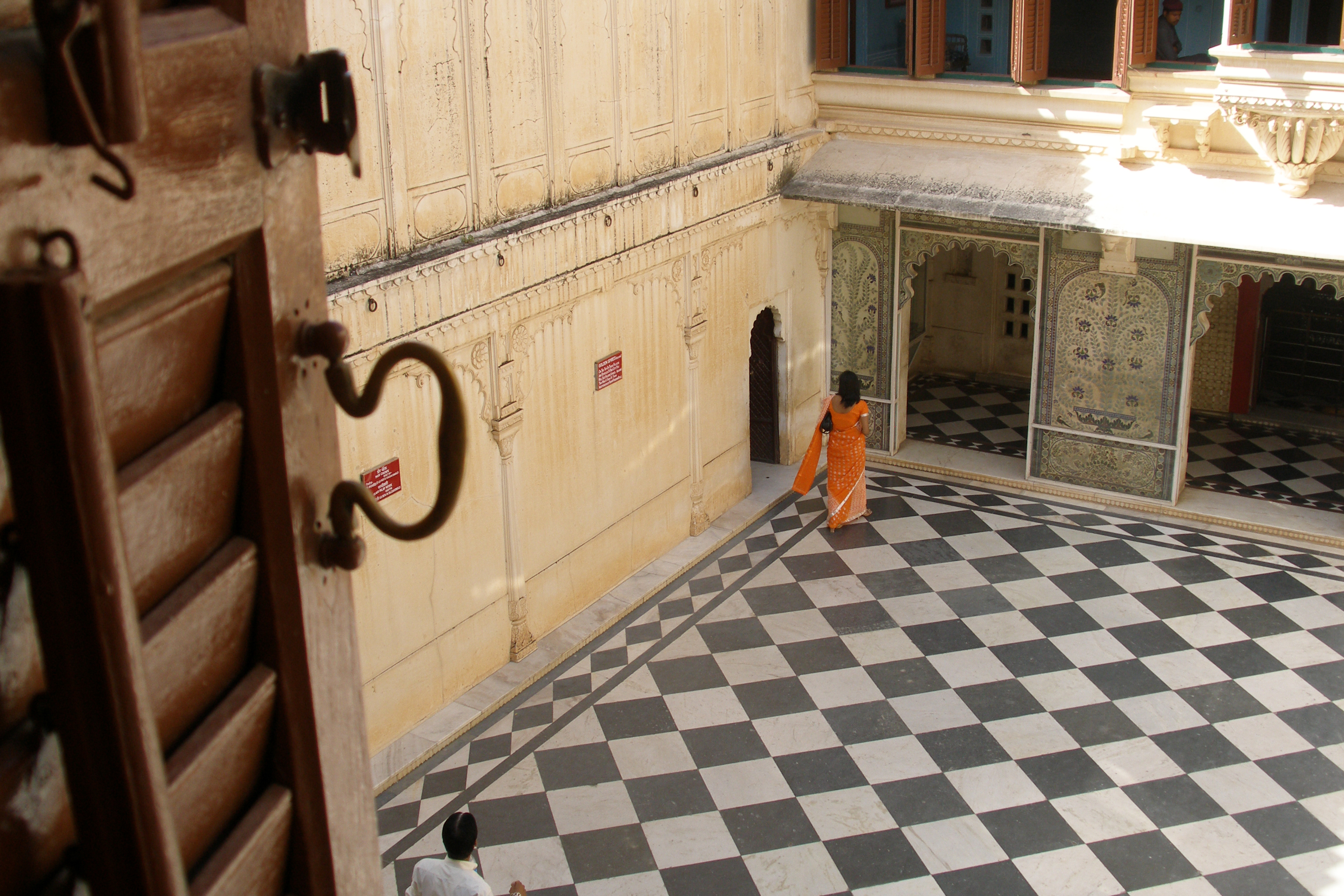
Interiors.

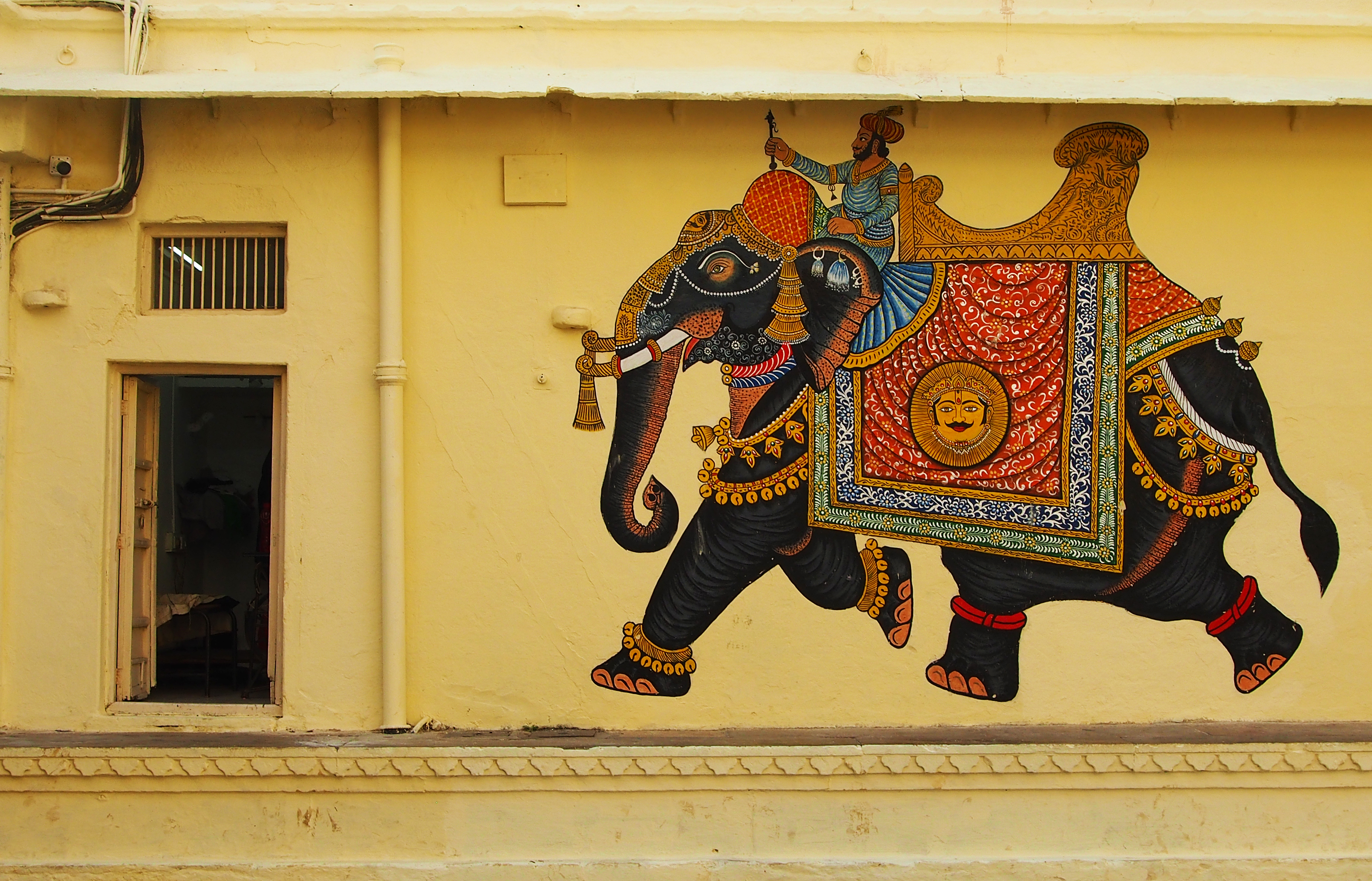
Mural at Moti Chowk - City Palace, Udaipur
