= Rai Pannalal Mehta =

Rai Pannalal Mehta CIE
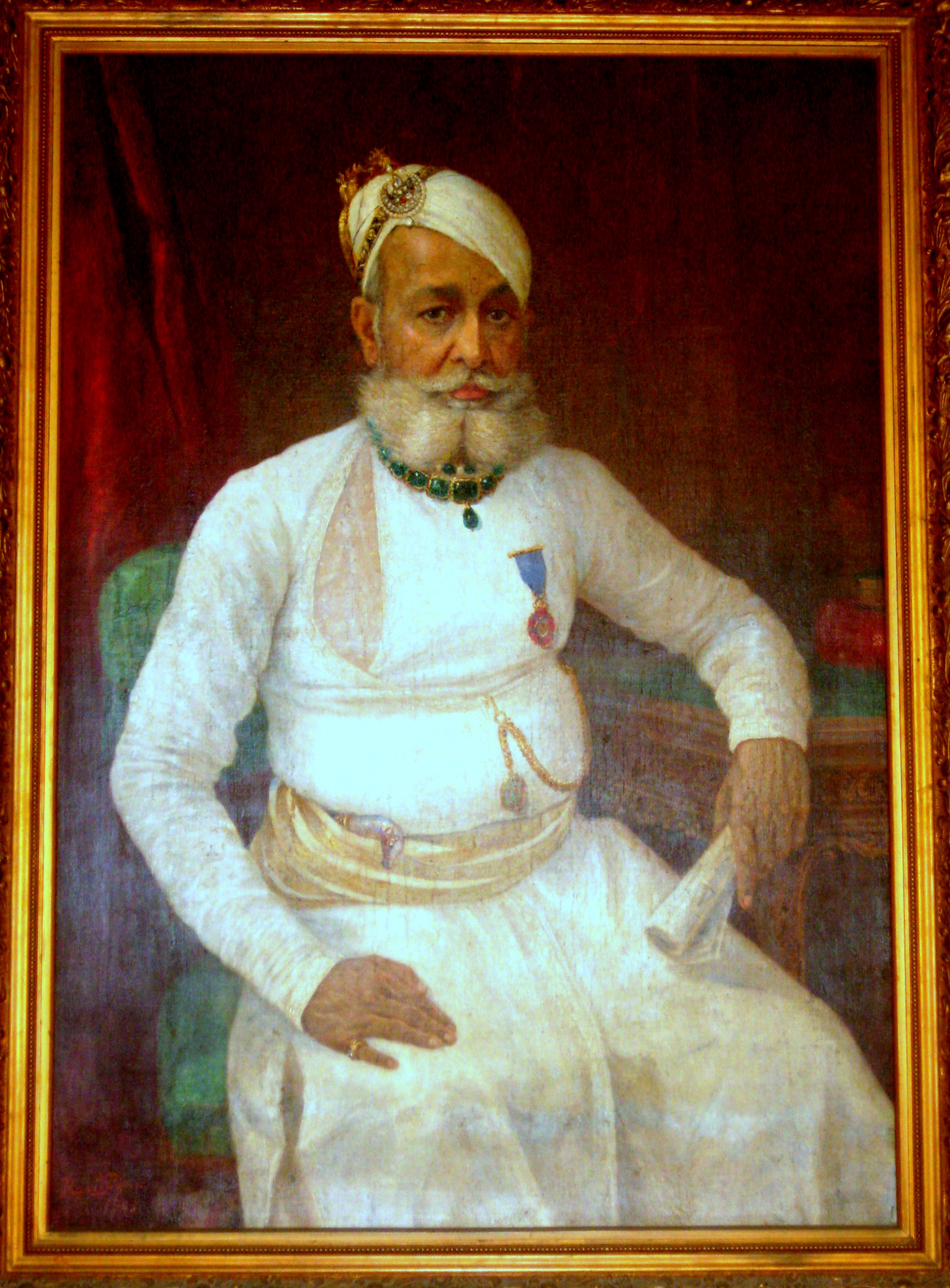
- Portrait of Rai Pannalal Mehta by Raja Ravi Varma (1901).
- Born: 1843
- Died: 1919 (aged 75–76)
- Resting place: Mahasatiyaji at Aayad in Udaipur (Rajasthan, India)
- Occupation: Secretary to Executive Council : 1869-78 AD Prime Minister of Mewar : 1878-94 AD
- Title: Rai
- Predecessor: Pradhan Gokal Chand Mehta
- Successor: No one was officially appointed till Independence of India in 1947
- Children: Fatehlal Mehta
- Father: Murlidhar Mehta
- Relatives: Lakshmilal and Takhat Singh Mehta (Brothers)

Mewar Vibhuti (distinguished; विभूति), Pradhan Rai Pannalal Mehta (1843–1919) served four Maharanas, as Prime Minister of Mewar state in former state of Rajputana (now Rajasthan) in India.

Rai Pannalal Mehta carried out the duties of Munshi (Secretary) Mahakma Khas (Executive Council) from 1869 to 1878 AD. De facto he was carrying out the duties of Pradhan (Prime Minister), as most of the time the post of Pradhan was either not filled or their powers were diluted. In 1878, he was formally appointed as Pradhan. In 1894, on the advice of Agent to the Governor General, Col GH Trevor, Pannalal proceeded on long leave and whilst on a pilgrimage, he resigned.

During his tenure as Pradhan, Rai Pannalal Mehta was instrumental in conceiving and promoting various reforms and public interest projects:

- The Separation of judiciary from executive and the publication of the first regular Gazette cum Journal.
- Land and fiscal reforms and introduction of financial budget.
- In 1885, Lord Dufferin, then Viceroy of India, laid foundation for New Walter Zanana Hospital (now Ayurvedic Hospital at Moti Chohatta, Udaipur)
- In 1889, Prince Albert Victor, inaugurated the marble statue of his grandmother Empress Victoria in Gulab Bagh.
- In 1889, Lord Lansdowne, then Viceroy of India, inaugurated public library (now Sarasvati Sarvajanik Pustakalya) in Gulab Bagh, Udaipur.
- In 1889, Duke and Duchess of Connaught, laid foundation of Connaught Dam (now called Fateh Sagar Paal).
- In 1889, Marwar-Mewar railway line project (1885–89) completed.
- In 1889, amicably resolved century-old border dispute between Marwar and Mewar at Pagliya-ki-Naal (Desuri), directly with Maharaja Jaswant Singh of Jodhpur, Marwar.
- In 1891, proposed construction of railways line to connect Udaipur with Chittor, but it was stalled by vested interests.

== Upbringing ==
Rai Pannalal Mehta was born in 1843 AD (Vikram Samvat 1900, Bhadava sud 2; Indian Lunar calendar) at Udaipur to Murlidhar Mehta, a trusted emissary of Maharana Swarup Singh. Rai Pannalal Mehta (1843–1919) writes in his autobiography, ‘Swa-jeevni’,

"My upbringing rested totally with my mother as my father Murlidhar Mehta was away to Kota on Durbar (court of ruler; दरबार) duties most of the time. When I was 12-13 years old, my elder cousin Ajeet Singh Mehta, then Hakim (Administrator) Nimbahera (1851-57), started my physical training and horse-riding instructions. Ajeet Singh insisted that I also learn Farsi & English and attend to Kachahri (courthouse; कचहरी). Then as young boy, I was often asked to visit Durbar of Shriji Hazoor (His Highness; श्रीजी हजूर) Maharana Swarup Singh at Goverdhan Vilas. Whenever there was discussion on accounts and calculation, I was always quick to answer”.

This impressed Maharana Swarup Singh and he started keeping watch on Pannalal. During 1857 revolution English ladies were put up in Jag Mandir, an island garden palace in Lake Pichola at Udaipur for safety. The young Pannalal was sent there to take care of hospitality, as he knew English fluently. Later in 1857, Pannalal was married at the age of 14 years to the daughter of Chaganlal Kothari, younger brother of Kesri Singh Kothari, who also held post of Pradhan for short duration and interim periods.

== Administrative career ==
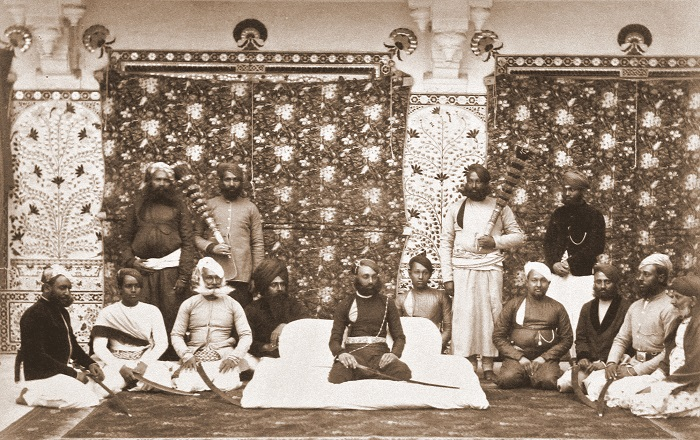
Maharana Fateh Singh with Pradhan Pannalal Mehta on his right, and Fatehlal Mehta (son of Pannalal) behind the bolster on right in Durbar at Mor Chowk (1884) - Courtesy Museum Archives of the Maharanas of Mewar

Young Pannalal started his administrative career in 1860 at Nimbahera, at Rupees 25/- per month. He assisted his uncle and former Pradhan (1827–29, 1831–39 and 1844–56) of Mewar and then Hakim (Administrator) at Nimbahera, Sher Singh Mehta. During a short apprenticeship at Nimbahera, his administrative acumen and negotiation skills were noticed by Maharana Swarup Singh. He was asked to report to political officer's office at Choti Sadri and then to Udaipur in 'Dewani Office' (office of Pradhan).

On 23 December 1869, the Maharana announced establishment of a new executive council called ‘Mahakma Khas’ (Executive Council; महकमा खास) and appointed Pannalal Mehta as its Munshi (Secretary; मुंशी). Subsequently, various important administrative reforms in the Mewar State, such as land reforms, revenue settlement, sati-pratha, salt trade agreement, reconstitution of state council, etc., were carried out under the guidance and leadership of Pannalal, who was de facto Pradhan of the state.

Eminent historian RK Gupta obverses in his book Studies in Indian History: Rajasthan Through the Ages,

“On the 23rd December 1869, the Maharana announced establishment of a new executive council called ‘Mahakma Khas’ and appointed Pannalal Mehta as its Munshi. In July 1870, Kothari Kesari Singh resigned from the post of Pradhan as he was opposed to the new changes in the administration of Justice. The post of Pradhan was not immediately filled up but Pannalal, the Munshi acted as the medium of communication between the ruler and the various branches of the administration. Later, the work of Pradhan was handed over to Mehta Gokal Chand – taking care of administration and Laxmanrao looking after the judiciary”

.

== Awards and honours ==
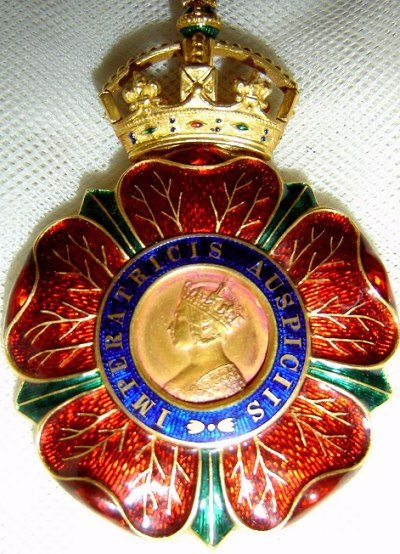
Rai Pannalal Mehta awarded the title of CIE (Companion of Indian Empire) in 1887.

The British Government held an Imperial Durbar at Delhi on 1 January 1877, to proclaim the assumption of the title of ‘Empress of India’. Pannalal Mehta and Kothari Chaganlal (also his father-in-law) received the titles of ‘Rai’. The title of His Excellency, the courtesy title as Prime Minister of the state of Mewar, was extended only to Rai Pannalal Mehta. Rao Bhakhta Singh of Bedla was awarded the title of ‘Rao Bahadur’.

In 1887, the fifty-year golden jubilee of the reign of Queen Victoria was celebrated throughout the British Empire. Maharana Fateh Singh was awarded the title of GCSI (Knight Grand Commander of the Order of the Star of India) and his Prime Minister Rai Pannalal Mehta was awarded the title of CIE (Companion of the most Eminent order of the Indian empire).

== Golden period of Mewar history: reforms and projects ==
The separation of judiciary from executive and the publication of the first regular Gazette-cum-Journal are cited as examples of contributions made by Rai Pannalal Mehta. As a principal advisor to Maharanas Shambhu Singh and Sajjan Singh, he is credited with balancing loyalty to the Maharanas, coordination with the British political department, and the interests of the state's people.

Maharana Shambhu Singh (1874–84), on advice of Rai Pannalal Mehta, decided to take measures to make regular settlement of the land revenue in the Khalsa (state owned land; खाल्सा). Maharana was embroiled not only in administrative problems, but also disputes and insubordination from his close relatives and nobles. Therefore, Pannalal concentrated on reorganisation and fiscal reforms in the administration and to bring together all stakeholders on board for smooth running of the affairs of the state. Under able guidance of Pannalal, Maharana Sajjan Singh could win back the trust of his kin and nobles (ठाकुर और सिरदर) and the public at large. Among the major administrative reforms, was making financial budget for various expenditures and revenues. Pannalal took steps that introduced Mewar to modernity. He widened roads and built new ones. He ordered the reforestation of the surrounding hills, laid new water pipelines and repaired existing water tanks.

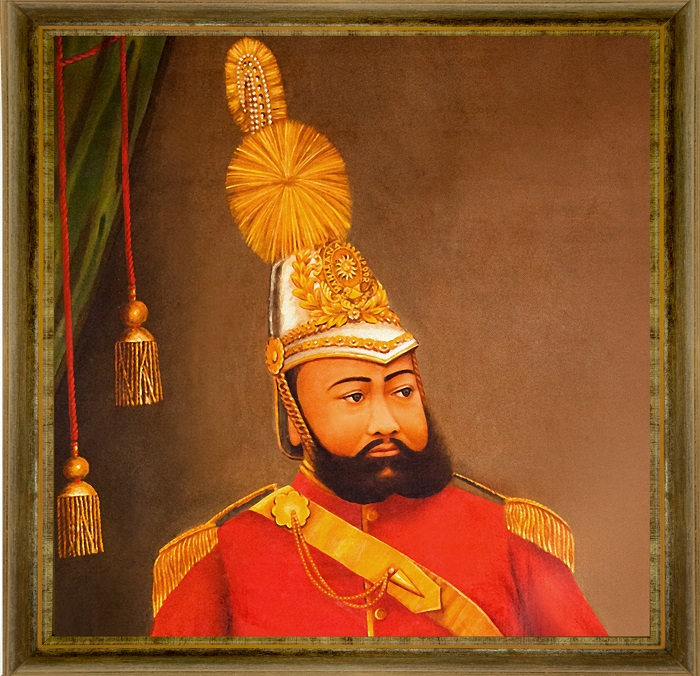
Portrait of Laxmilal Mehta - Military commander and Hakim Jahajpur (1876-88). Painted in 1904 by Artist Pannalal Chatur.

Pannalal modernised the police force and established settlement department, which recorded correct boundaries for agricultural fields and villages. Mewer's judicial system was also upgraded. Maharana Sajjan Singh inaugurated a separate civil court and a criminal court where a committee, like the modern jury system, made the decisions. Mahadraj Sabha, like a High Court was also established, along with new government departments. He also established an Education Committee and set up first government printing press in the state.

This is also known as the 'golden period' in the history of Mewar. Mehta Pannalal writes in his book Swa-Jeewani (Autobiography),

“In 1877, the military was also reorganised. The fighting force was separated from law & order force under the directions of Laxmilal Mehta, Commanding Officer of Mewar military and Hakim at Jahajpur”.

Laxmilal was the younger brother of Pannalal.

During the reign of Maharana Fateh Singh, Pannalal was instrumental in conceiving and promoting various public interest projects. On the recommendations of Pannalal, it was also decided to raise the paal (dam; पाल) of Devali-ka-Talaab (देवाली का तालाब) by 20 feet. The foundation stone was laid by Duke of Connaught in 1889. The paal was christened as ‘Connaught Bandh’ and lake was renamed as ‘Fateh Sagar’. Later a canal connecting Swarup Sagar with Fateh Sagar, suggested by Pannalal and named Thompson canal, after Mr Thompson, the engineer behind the project was constructed. Similarly, the projects for setting up of Zanana (Women) Hospital, in 1885, at Moti Chohatta and Sarasvati Sarvajanik Pustkalay, (public library; सरस्वती सार्वजनिक पुस्तकालय) in 1889 at Gulab Bagh were completed. The project of Marwar-Mewar railway line were conceived in 1885 and completed in 1889 by Pannalal. The century-old border dispute between Marwar and Mewar about Pagaliyon-ki-Naal (valley pass at Desuri; पगलियों की नाल) was tactfully resolved directly by Pradhan Rai Pannalal Mehta with Maharaja Jaswant Singh of Jodhpur in 1891. However, in 1891, proposal for construction of railway line to connect Udaipur with Chittor by Pannalal was stalled by vested interests and his detractors.

== Conspiracy and displeasure ==
Since the welfare and well being of Mewar state was always foremost with Rai Pannalal Mehta, certain Sirdars & Umraos (the nobility) were envious of his growing popularity and began to conspire against him. He faced court displeasure, attack on his life and exile from the state. However, each time he returned more determined and powerful. Eminent historian BK Gupta writes in his book, ‘Studies in Indian History: Rajasthan Through the Ages’,

“An anti-English group developed, comprising mainly Maharaj Gaj Singh and Kothari Balwant Singh, who supported Maharana Fateh Singh. Rai Pannalal Mehta, CIE, had been working as the Minister since Maharana Shambhu Singh’s time. He enjoyed British support throughout the period of his service as a Minister. Gradually he came to be looked upon as British ‘Agent’ in the state enjoying the powers of Pradhan, that the young Maharana Sajjan Singh never had the courage to oppose him outright.”

BK Gupta continues,

“The construction of railway line was indeed the brainchild of Pannalal Mehta with support from the British Resident. However, anti-British group, who were constantly opposing the progressive measures by Pradhan Pannalal also opposed the construction of Railway line, as local traders who ran transportation and supply line would lose their business, because of improved and cheaper means of transporting goods and passenger.”

Earlier, on the suspicion of poisoning Maharana Shambhu Singh, Pannalal was dismissed as Secretary. He was at once arrested and imprisoned on 9 September 1874 and kept in Karan Vilas Palace (popularly known as kitchen; रसोड़ा). The security guards were also placed at his residence and those of his brother Takhat Singh Mehta and few others. A few days before his arrest, Gopal Singh (Kataria) Mehta (his brother-in-law) had sent a message to Pannalal that he is likely to be arrested soon and he should escape incognito. But Mehta Pannalal replied,

“I am grateful for your advice. But I have worked in the best interest of the state and have not committed any crime. Hence I shall not escape.”

His detractors continued to invent other charges, such as corruption but failed. However, Pannalal continued to remain in custody. Lt Col Wright, the Political Agent at Udaipur counseled the Maharana not to punish Pannalal and others until an open and fair trial had been held.

== Attempt on life and exile ==
Maharana Shambhu Singh could not recover from his illness and breathed his last on 7 October 1874. Maharana was only 27 years old when he died. Rai Pannalal Mehta, who was under close custody, requested permission to accompany the funeral procession of late Maharana Shambhu Singh. His request was granted with two security guards attending on him. At Mahasatyaji (royal cremation ground at Aayad in Udaipur), he sat under a tree to take some rest. He was brutally attacked thrice with sword by unknown persons, believed to be at the instigation of his detractors. He received two wounds on the head and one on the shoulder. Because of headgear (pagdi; पगड़ी) his life was saved.

Later, under Maharana Sajjan Singh, Pannalal was called by Political Agent Lt Col Wright and told, “The Charges against you have been dismissed, except for corruption Charge.” Though Pannalal vehemently denied the corruption charge but Agent said that since he has large number of detractors in the state, it would be advisable for him to leave Mewar for some time. Pannalal left for Ajmer in October 1874. In view of safety, Political Agent, Lt Col Wright provided five riders from Ashind and Shahpura villages, to accompany the carriage of Pannalal to Ajmer.

Shahiwal Arjun Singh, was appointed as Secretary to Mahakma Khas in place of Pannalal. He could not fit himself in the new system of work and atmosphere dominated by the Political Agent, so he resigned after a few months from Mahakma Khas in 1875. Kothari Chaganlal who was working as the head of Finance department was appointed as the Secretary in place of Sahiwal and he too could not work satisfactorily. After about eight months in 1875, new Political Agent Col Herbert wrote to Pannalal Mehta, then at Ajmer,

“I am happy to inform that previous Agents had praised your work and you are free to return to Udaipur as such there was no ban on you. But you are cautioned that your detractors are still present and ready for revenge”.

Maharana Sajjan Singh directed that Pannalal be sent to take charge of Mahakma Khas and was re-appointed on 8 September 1875 as Munshi to Mahakma Khas. Although he was not designated as Prime Minister, but he has been referred to as Pradhan both orally and in letters. He was also restored with jagir (a feudal land grant; जागीर) and other allowances.

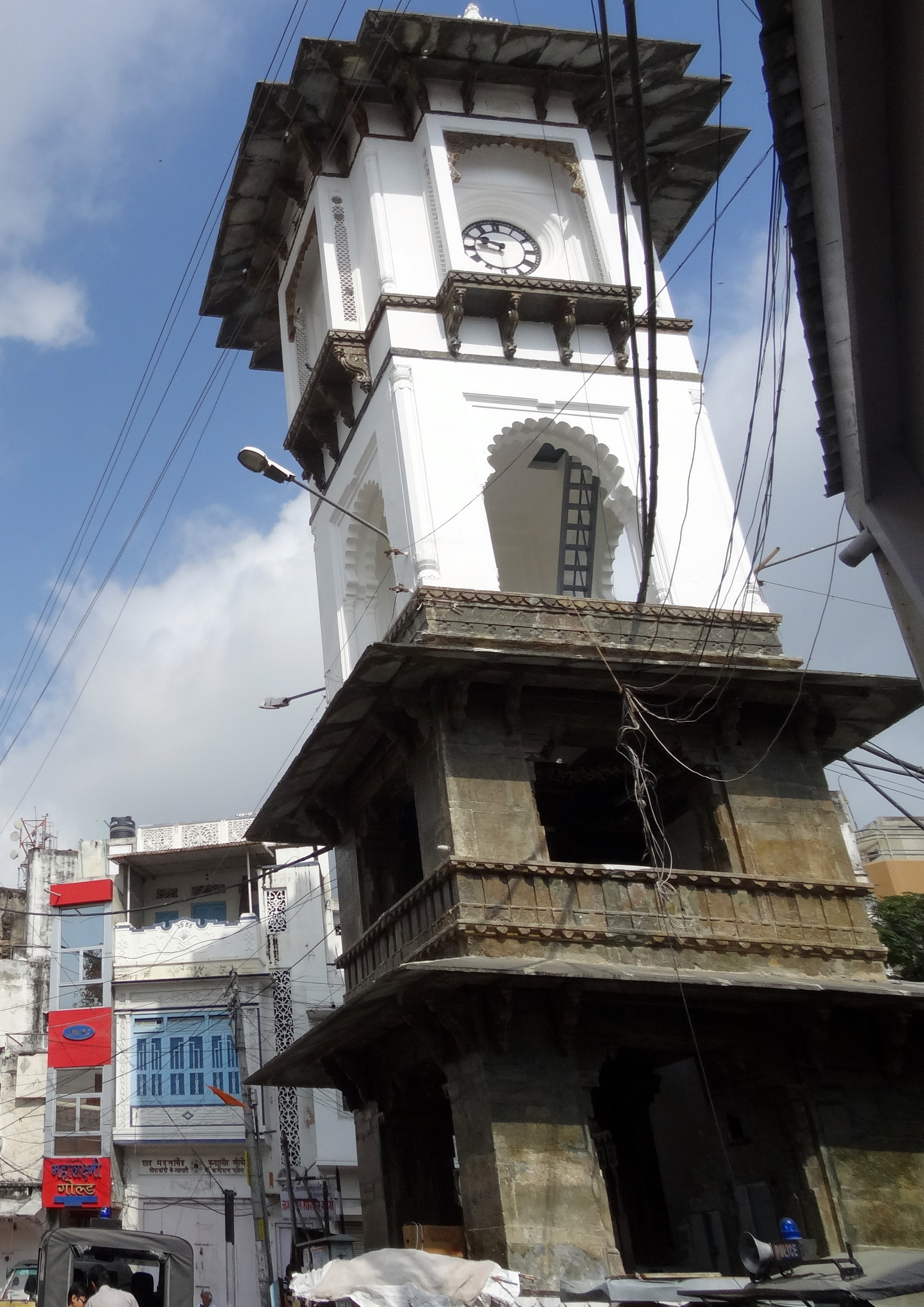
City Clock Tower - symbol of communal harmony. Constructed in 1887 by Pradhan Rai Pannalal Mehta

== Appointed as Pradhan ==
In 1878, Rai Pannalal Mehta was formally appointed as Pradhan (Prime Minister) of Mewar upon demise of Pradhan Gokal Chand Mehta (1856–59, 1861–67, 1874–78). Although, Gokal Chand was Pradhan but de facto Pannalal was running the affairs of the state as Munshi to Mahakma Khas.

== City Clock Tower – symbol of communal harmony ==
“Hazoor (Your Highness), there is no clock tower (Ghanta Ghar; घंटा घर ) in the city, hence it is proposed to build a clock tower in front of city Kotwali (police station; कोतवाली), to symbolise the harmony between Mahajans and Bohras”.

In 1887, there was a street fight with bricks and batons between Mahajans (a Hindu/Jain trader sect) and Bohras (a Muslim sect), over taking a male goat through Maldas street at Udaipur for sacrifice during holy festive month. The proactive Pradhan, Rai Pannalal Mehta immediately summoned a company of military to control the people of two communities. The prompt action of Pradhan to contain the riot was well appreciated by both Maharana and the Resident. The British Resident conducted the enquiry and fined Rupees 5000 to each community. Upon which Pannalal proposed to Maharana Fateh Singh,

The fine so collected was also added towards grant from Durbar. The Clock Tower was constructed under the supervision of Pradhan Rai Pannalal Mehta. It stands tall even today, with the same Kotwali in the background.

== Pradhan resigns whilst on leave ==
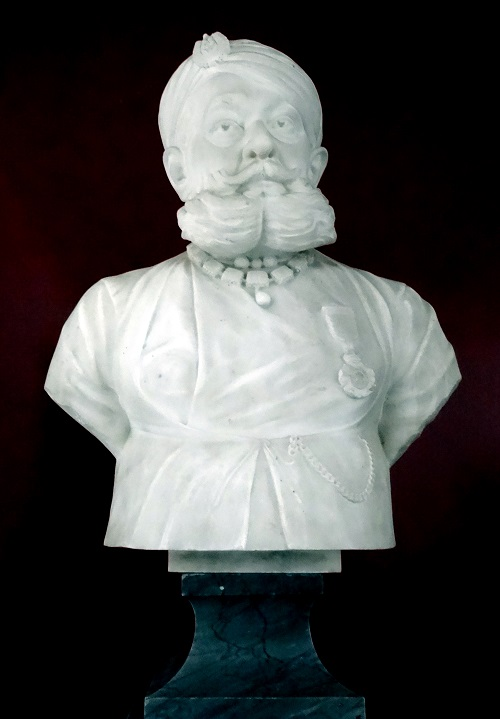
Bust of Pradhan Rai Pannalal Mehta. Sculpted in 1925 by Rai Bahadur GK Mhatre. Pannalal bust identified by Sandeep Dahisarkar, archaeologist and art historian.

The detractors of Pradhan Rai Pannalal Mehta continued to fill the ears of Maharana Fateh Singh with negative information about the former. In August 1894, Agent to the Governor General (AGG) Col GH Trevor came to Udaipur from Abu. When AGG Col Trevor met Maharana, the latter expressed his desire to dismiss Pannalal from the post of Prime Minister, as in his opinion Pannalal was the evil spirit conspiring in everything against him and was corrupt to the core. The Maharana further stated that he would have dismissed Pannalal long ago, but for fear of the interference by the British Government. Trevor did not like Maharana's idea, however, he found him firm on his decision to remove Pannalal. Trevor, before leaving, called Pannalal aside and advised him to take long leave and proceed out of Udaipur.

It was decided that Pradhan Rai Pannalal Mehta will be allowed to take paid leave and then resign. In September 1894, Pannalal took leave for six months and handed over the charge of Mahakma Khas to Sahiwala Arjun Singh and Kothari Balwant Singh. Pannalal submitted his resignation after a few weeks on leave. He spent the remaining years of his life in Mewar as a close observer of the affairs of the state. During the above meeting with the Maharana, Col Trevor, however, achieved an Imperial objective, while conceding to the Maharana's demand to dismiss Pannalal, he could persuade Maharana to agree to construct the long pending railway line from Chittor to Udaipur. The Maharana was then counselled by the British government to appoint someone as the Prime Minister which the former declined to do. Maharana Fateh Singh was not prepared to part with his ruling powers. Once Pradhan Rai Pannalal Mehta resigned, he never, throughout next thirty years of his reign, employed an official as the Prime Minister. Though Pannalal did not receive official acceptance of resignation but he received an appreciation letter from AGG Col GH Trevor at Abu:

Rai Pannalal Mehta, CIE, has been the Chief official of the Udaipur Durbar for I believe about 25 years and has been highly praised for his abilities by successive Residents. He now retires from office having been held in high estimation by the Government and to the regret of many friends in Mewar.

My best wishes to him. I trust he will find peace and repose after his long-distinguished career.
GH Trevor
Agent to the Governor General for Rajputana
Abu, 18th March 1895

== Charismatic personality ==
Raja Ravi Varma, a celebrated Indian painter and artist, closely related to the royal family of Travancore (Trivandrum), visited Udaipur at the invitation of Maharana Fateh Singh, from Saturday 6 April 1901 onward to commission his portrait. Varma writes in his autobiography ‘Raja Ravi Varma: Portrait of an Artist’

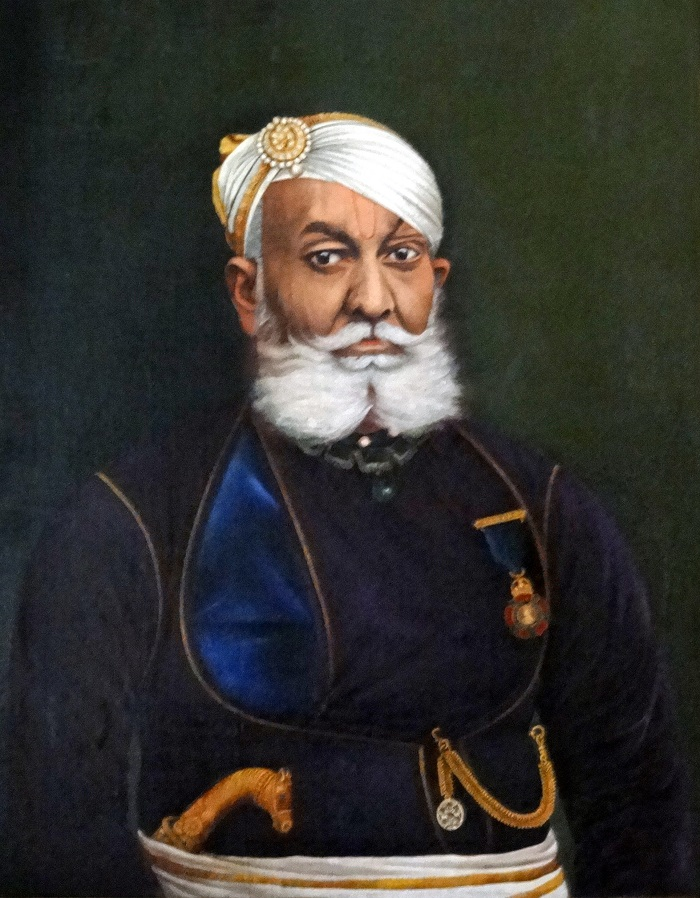
Portrait of Rai Pannalal Mehta. Painted in 1910 by Artist Pannalal Chatur, Mewar

"We met Fatehlal Mehta, a noble of Mewar state, with whom we had a long correspondence on the subject of their visit, at the Public Gardens. Mr Fatehlal Mehta had returned only the day before from the pilgrimage. He is the son of Rai Pannalal Mehta, CIE and former Dewan of Udaipur….”

Raja Ravi Varma liked the charismatic and photogenic face of Pannalal so much, that they requested Fatehlal to ask his father to sit for a photo session. They then completed his portrait at Travancore (Trivandrum). Varma writes in his book (25 June 1901).

"Rai Pannalal Mehta, our friend’s father, sat to us this evening for his portrait which we intend finishing at home, as our departure is approaching. His features are very regular and his complexion is fair. He has a dignified and noble air. He was Dewan of the state for nearly thirty years and had during his administration introduced many reforms of improvement.”

Capt Pitney, then a British Resident in India once described Pannalal Mehta as,

“I have met royal persons and dignitaries in my life and sometimes been disappointed but one person I shall never forget is Rai Pannalal Mehta, former Pradhan of Mewar. I saw him first when he called on me in plain and spotless white with his uncurled white Rajput beard framing the face like smoothly wrinkled parchment. He moved with such dignity that in slightness of his figure seemed of no account but his gaze defied flattery and deceit. Though he spoke softly, every syllable could be heard in rush, which his calm presence created. I thought of myself that if that was the result of over five hundred years of breeding and generations of Mehtas, there was clearly something to be said for preserving such qualities for the further well-being of this clan”.

Rai Pannalal Mehta passed away at Udaipur in December 1919. He was cremated with full state honours at Mahasatiyaji in Oswal nobles’ (Musaddi’s) cremation area. A cenotaph (Chatri) in the memory of Pradhan Rai Pannalal Mehta was constructed by his son Mehta Fatehlal in 1920. At the time of his death he was survived by his son Fatehlal, grandsons Devilal and Udailal, who all distinguished as able high-profile administrators in the state of Mewar. Pannalal’s younger brother Laxmilal predeceased him in 1906 and youngest brother Takhat Singh passed away in 1924. Pannalal was the last Pradhan of Mewar state and also from Bachhawat clan, who held this exalted position in the reign of four successive Maharanas, starting with Swarup Singh, Shambhu Singh, Sajjan Singh and ending with Fateh Singh.

Pannalal maintained a diary along with important correspondence and documents in his life time but he formally commenced collating and writing his memoirs in 1916. Later in 1960s his great grandson Mehta Gokal Lal, IAS, collated all the information to publish a biographical book, ‘Swa-Jeewni – Rai Pannalal Mehta, CIE, Amatya of Mewar State’.

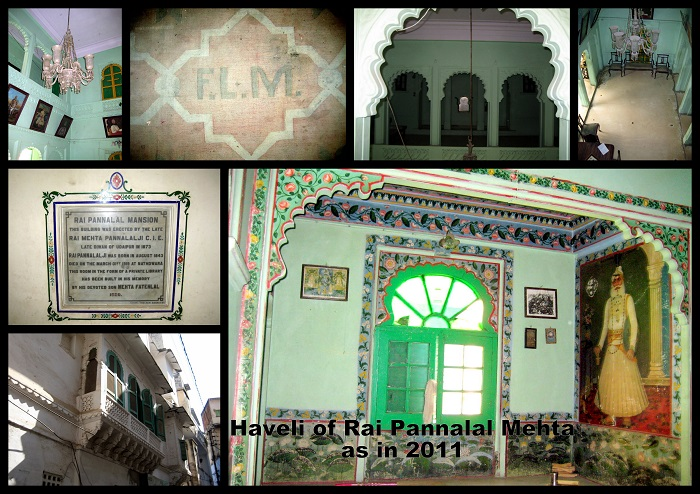
Haveli (1869-73) of Rai Pannalal Mehta as in 2011

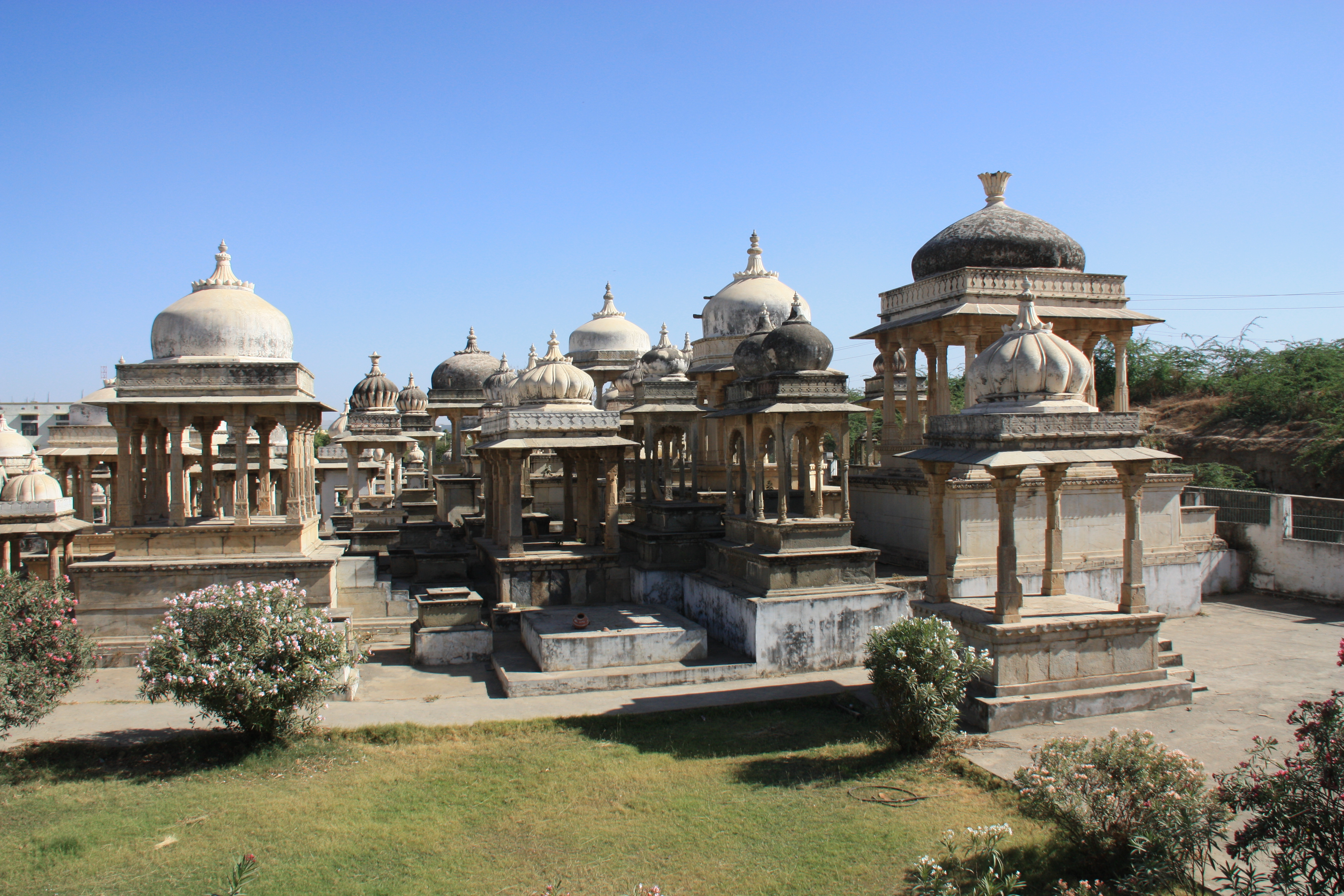
Royal Cremation - Mahasatiyaji at Aayad, Udaipur, Rajasthan, India

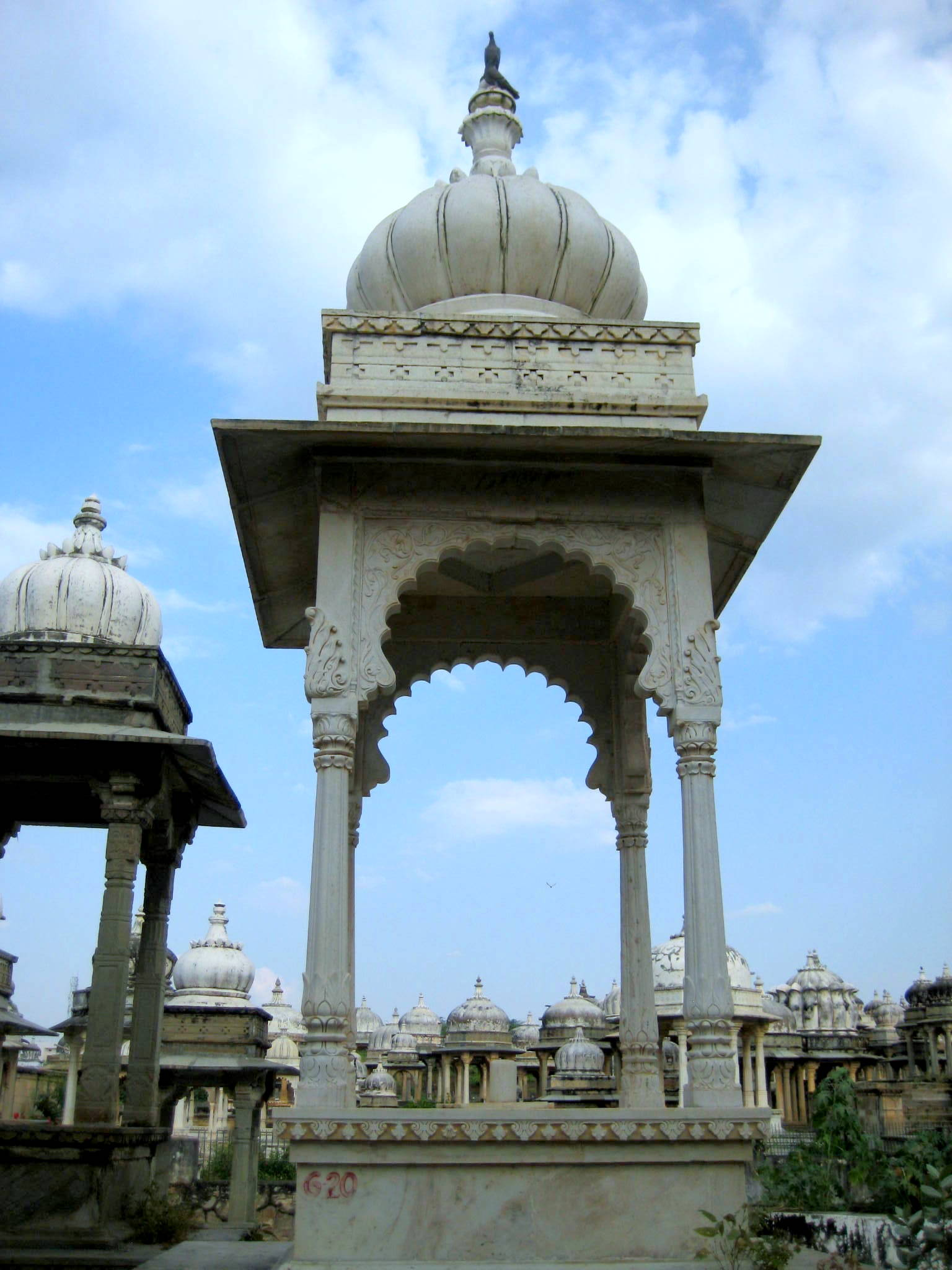
Cenotaph of Pradhan Rai Pannalal Mehta at Mahasatiyaji in Aayad, Udaipur
