= Chetavani ra Chungatya =

Patriotic Dingal poem

- by Thakur Kesari Singh Barhath
- Written: 1903
- First published in: India
- Country: India
- Language: Dingal (Rajasthani)
- Subjects: British rule; Indian Independence Movement
- Publisher: Shodh Patrika
- Publication date: 1953
- Media type: paperback
- Lines: 26

Chetavani ra Chungatya (Devnagari: चेतावणी रा चूंगटिया; transl: The Pinches of Admonition or Urges to Awake) is a patriotic Dingal poem composed by Thakur Kesari Singh Barhath in 1903 and addressed to Maharana of Mewar, Fateh Singh, exhorting him to uphold the traditions of his lineage and to not attend the Delhi Durbar organized by the British Raj. The couplets had the desired effect on the Maharana who decided not to attend the durbar despite being present in Delhi. The work remains one of the great literary works produced during the freedom struggle. It consists of 13 stanzas or sortha (saurashtra-duha).

== Background ==
=== Invitation ===
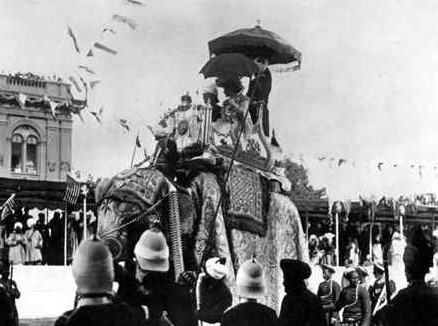
Lord and Lady Curzon arriving at the Delhi Durbar, 1903.

The Delhi Durbar of 1903 was held to celebrate the succession of King Edward VII and Queen Alexandra as Emperor and Empress of India. At the same time, the capital of British India was shifted from Kolkata to Delhi. Lord Curzon had obtained the consent of almost all the kings, nawabs, feudatories, and vassals, except the Maharana of Udaipur (Mewar), to appear in the Durbar.

In response, the Maharajas of Jaipur, Jodhpur, Kishangarh, Sirohi, Kota, Bikaner, etc., appreciated the invitation & expressed joy & gratitude. Udaipur, however, received it coldly due to the treaty of 1818 (Note: They argued that Maharana's presence was not obligatory as per the Treaty and Alliance of 1818 signed between Mewar and the British.) b/w Mewar State and the British. Lord Curzon went to convince the Maharana to attend the Delhi Durbar, which he eventually agreed to do with conditions: first position among the native rulers of India, exemption from the procession, and a seat in keeping with his status.'

The main concern of Maharana was the potential compromise of his claim to precedence over all other Indian princes. Thus, it was assured that "due consideration would be given to his dignity" and his place would be first in the order of precedence among all the ruling Princes of India.

=== The Counsel ===
The general opinion of the nobles and the people in the Mewar State was against the Maharana's decision. Even many nobles and chieftains from outside Mewar State were disheartened at the news. Some of them gathered and requested Thakur Kesari Singh Barhath to find a solution to this predicament.

Kesari Singh Barhath of Devpura (Shahpura), earlier chief advisor to Fateh Singh, consulted Rao Gopal Singh of Kharwa to dissuade Maharana from going to Delhi. Thakur Hari Singh of Khatu, Thakur Karan Singh of Jobner, Rao Umrao Singh, Sajjan Singh of Khandela and Thakur Bhur Singh from Malsisar joined in. Everyone agreed that to uphold Mewar's pride, Fateh Singh should be reminded of Rana's traditions, pride and honor. These discussions took place at Malsisar thakur's haveli in Jaipur.

Rao Gopal Singh suggested that in critical times such as this in the history of Rajputana, the Charanas have always given the right guidance through their eloquent speech. Hence, Kesari Singh was entrusted with this task, who composed a poem of thirteen sorthas, hearing which, everyone present there were very impressed. They were certain of the effectiveness of these sorthas (couplets) that if conveyed to Maharana in time, he would give up the idea of attending the Durbar.

The purpose of the poem was to convey to the Maharana that it was derogatory to his dignity and beneath his status to attend the Durbar, and would impair the prestige, which he enjoyed among the Rajputs and the Hindus of India.

=== Delhi Durbar-1903 ===
Rao Gopal Singh Kharwa had taken the responsibility of delivering these couplets to Fateh Singh in Udaipur, titled Chetavani Ra Chungatia. However, by the time he arrived, Fateh Singh had departed by train. Despite this, Zorawar Singh, younger brother of Kesari Singh, was prepared and delivered the couplets in hand to Maharana at Sareri (Bhilwara) or Nasirabad railway station en route to Delhi.

Rao Gopal Singh writes in a letter to his nephew Khet Singh, "Kesari Singhji, a devotee of Kshattra Shakti, composed a couplet addressed to Maharana Saheb. At that time, Maharana Saheb had left for Udaipur by a special train. This couplet was then presented before Shri Darbar at the Nasirabad station, where he stated that if he had received these couplets in Udaipur itself, then he wouldn't have left. However, he would only deliberate on the matter after reaching Delhi."

=== The deliberation ===
It is believed that Fateh Singh came to Delhi due to the pressure of the colonial government, but reading the couplets written by Kesari Singh had a profound effect on him. Moreover, his conditions over precedence in seating were not followed. The poet reminded the Maharana of the glorious and heroic traditions of his ancestors, who never submitted to any power nor paid ‘Nazar’ (Note: Nazar is a tribute conventionally presented at a ruler's accession. Jagirdars present nazar to the king and the king may present nazar to the emperor.) to anyone but carried on constant struggle to uphold their name and fame. The composition accused the ruler of deviating from the heroic traditions of his dynasty. The couplets had clearly indicated the wishes of the people.

The famous Indian diarist Amar Singh, son of Thakur Narayan Singh of Kanota, attended the Delhi Durbar as an Imperial Cadet. He recounted in his diary that Sir Pratap, Maharaja of Idar & Regent of Jodhpur, was woken up at midnight by him & informed of Maharana's refusal to attend; who, in turn, informed Viceroy's secretary Lawrence of the situation and warned him that if undue pressure was put on Maharana or retaliatory action was taken, the matter would worsen. He reminded that, at the moment, the armed forces of all the princely states were halted in Delhi and their full sympathies remained with the Maharana. Lord Curzon, upon learning of this, reluctantly accepted the outcome.

Since his arrival in Delhi, Fateh Singh had stayed in his camp, the rebuking couplets (Chetavani ra Chungatya) causing him to reconsider his decision and creating turmoil. Thakur Narayan Singh of Kanota and Maharaja Jai Singh of Alwar disguised themselves and came to his camp to show their support. They detailed the arrangements for his travel from Delhi to Chittor, with horses at every mile: his travel from Delhi to Baswa to be handled by Alwar State, from Baswa to Jahazpur by Jaipur State, and from Jahazpur to Chittor by Gopal Singh Kharwa. Sir Pratap of Jodhpur would handle everything back in Delhi.

These words strengthened his resolve. Maharana declared he was ill and returned to Udaipur via a special train. (Note: Fateh Singh arrived in Delhi from on 31st December 1902. From Delhi, he onboarded the train back to Udaipur at 7pm on 3rd January 1903.)

== Chetavani ra Chungatya ==
Dingal	English translation
पग-पग भ्रम्या पहाड़, धरा छोड़ राख्यो धरम, महाराणा'र मेवाड़, हिरदै बसिया हिन्द रै।	Wandered among the hills giving up their lands, yet they upheld their dharma. That is why Maharana and Mewar, remain in the heart of India.
घणा घालिया घमसांण, राण सदा रहिया निडर, पेखंता फ़रमाण, हलचल किम फ़तमल हुवै !	Enduring insurmountable odds and fighting fierce battles, the Maharanas of Mewar were always fearless. But O Fateh Singh, what kind of stir in your mind was created by this small decree?
गिरद गजां घमसांण, नहचै धर माई नहीं, मावै किम महाराण, गज दोसे रा गिरद में !	Went into battle with thousands of elephants and innumerable soldiers that the earth fell short for them. How shall then Maharana fit into 200 yards of the Delhi Durbar?
ओरां ने आसाण, हाँका हरवळ हालणों, किम हालै कुल राण, हरवळ साहाँ हाँकिया !	Easy it is for other kings to be steered as they are herded into battle. But how shall thou be steered, whose ancestors had herded and driven back the imperial armies?
नरियंद सह नज़रांण, झुक करसी सरसी जिको, पसरैलों किम पाण, पाण छतां थारो फ़ता !	While other kings will offer nazrana, bowing down and extending their palms; but O Fateh Singh, how will you even raise your hand, who till today has not moved nor bowed down in front of anyone?
सिर झुकिया सहसांह, सींहासण जिण साम्हनै, रळणो पंगत-राह, फ़ाबै किम तोने फ़ता !	Heads of the Maharajas, Rao, Umrao, and Badshah bowed before the Sisodia throne. But how would it suit you to join the ranks of kings bowing down today?
सकल चढ़ावे सीस, दान धरम जिण रौ दियो, सो खिताब बखशीश, लैवण किम ललचावसी !	Those Maharanas whose donations and religious charities people accepted by touching their foreheads. How did that Maharana allow in his mind the greed of accepting titles and awards?
देखेला हिंदवाण, निज सूरज दिश नेह सूं, पण "तारा" परवाण, निरख निशाण न्हाकशी।	The people of India will look at the Hindua Suraj (Maharana) with affection, but finding the "star" (the title of Star of India) of the British government adorning your chest, their gaze will turn down with shame.
देखे अंजस दीह, मुळकेलो मन ही मनां, दम्भी गढ़ दल्लीह, शीश नमंता सीसवद।	It will see and celebrate, and smile deep down; the conceitful fort of Delhi, when the Sisodia bows his head.
अंत बेर आखीह, पातळ जै लांबा पहल, राणा सर राखी, जिणारी शाखी शिर जटा।	The injunctions Pratap gave in the end; never to bow, pay tax to the Delhi throne, or cutting hair; All the Maharanas followed this pledge, proof of which was the long hair on their heads.
"कठिण जमानो" कौल, बाँधे नर हीमत बिना, बीराँ हंदो बोल, पातल साँगे पेखियो।	Difficult times these are; none can keep his word without courage and a brave heart. Pratap and Sanga were such braves who were tested.
अब लग सारां आस, राणा रीत कुल राखसी, रहो सहाय सुख-रास, एकलिंग प्रभु आप रै।	And now all hope is upon you, Rana, that you will carry on the traditions (reet) of your lineage. May Lord Ekling be with you and give you the strength to succeed.
मान मोद सीसोद, राजनित बळ राखणो, गवरमिंटरी गोद, फ़ळ मीठा दीठा फ़ता !	Uphold your honour, O Sisodia, and keep with the political will and strength; O Fateh Singh, were the fruits ever sweet gained by sitting in the lap of the government?

== Assessment and reactions ==
This incident was widely published in newspapers with big headlines of Maharana withdrawing from the durbar. The incident was seen as part of the nationalistic movements gaining momentum across India. According to the poem, the visit would have been a dishonor to the millions of Hindus in the nation who saw the Mewar King as a savior of the Hindu religion. This ideological overtone was unique to Mewar.

Evaluating the impact of Chetavani Ra Chungatya, the eminent historian Raghubir Singh Gehlot writes—

'…….. The British had their sights on Rajasthan. Kesari Singh's opposition to the colonial government finally boiled over. Maharana Fateh Singh, following his predecessors, was reluctant to attend the Delhi Darbar, despite being invited. When he left for Delhi, Kesari Singh then spoke out against the Maharana and the dormant pride was ignited. Even the chief among the Rajput kings and the revered Hindu Suraj, the Maharana, was pinched (chungatya) that day by Kesari Singh, who with a thundering roar, questioned that descendant of Pratap and Raj Singh. Fateh Singh never attended, and his empty chair symbolically represented the defiance of the Rajput kings and their people. Lord Curzon did not challenge the Maharana. This had a huge impact on Rajasthan and the people, inspiring a wave of courage and hope against the harsh rule of the British.

Dr. Kanhaiyalal Rajpurohit writes—

While the Delhi Durbar was being held, the seat of the Maharana of Mewar was lying vacant. Maharana's special train was moving towards Udaipur. This was a huge blow to the imperialist conceit by the Indians. Kesari Singh's poignant deliverances had performed this miracle. The chetavani was really the call of the soul of Rajasthan which was not possible to ignore.

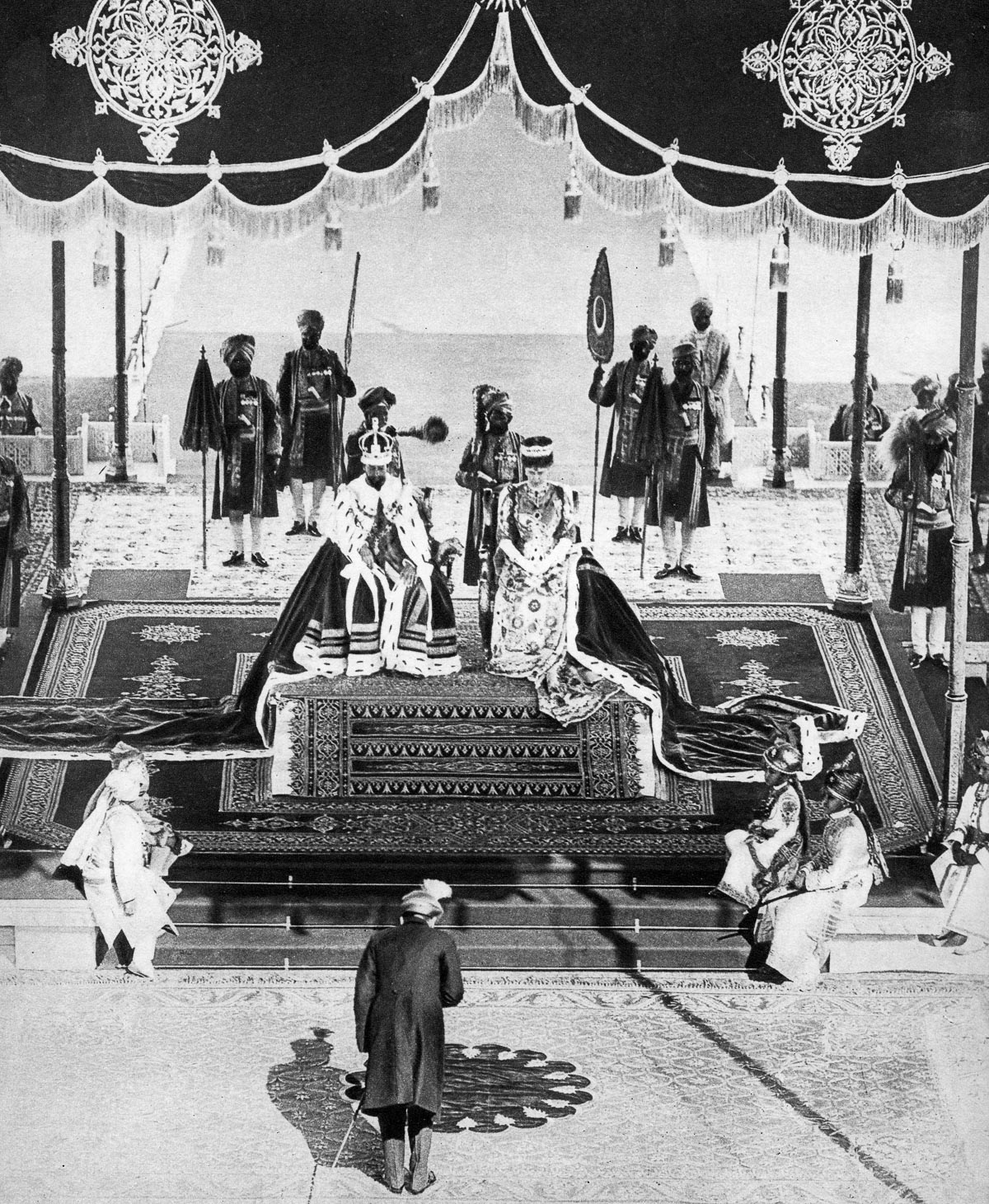
The Nizam of Hyderabad Mir Osman Ali Khan pays homage to the Emperor and Empress at the Delhi Durbar, December 1911

=== Delhi Durbar-1911 ===
Even in the Delhi Darbar of 1911, Maharana Fateh Singh did not attend the durbar and the royal procession of George V. He met the emperor at Salimgarh railway station and returned to Udaipur therefrom. The testimony of the accused Somdutt during the Nimej Murder Case (Arrah Conspiracy), whose main accused was Zorawar Singh Barhath, revealed the plannings of revolutionaries. It became known that Kesari Singh Barhath and Gopal Singh Kharwa had once again devised ways to prevent Maharana from attending the durbar.

The accused Somdutt alias Trivenidas Lahiri divulged in his statement—'An anonymous letter was prepared addressed to Maharana on behalf of the Sardars of Mewar, whose script was edited by me. It was mentioned in the letter that Maharana belongs to the Suryavansh, he has never bowed his head before the Mughals in the past. It would be better to commit suicide rather than bow before to the Firangi (British) now.'

=== Kesari-Pratap Charitra ===
Akshay Singh Ratnu, eminent poet and a trusted confidant of Maharaja of Alwar, has described this historical event in detail in his poem titled "Kesari-Pratap Charitra". This poetic work was published by Charan Sahitya Research Institute (Ajmer) in 1989.

=== Chetavani ra Chungatya (newspaper) ===
Chetavani ra Chungatya is also the name of a Hindi newspaper being published fortnightly from Kota.

== See also ==
- Kingdom of Mewar
- Thakur Kesari Singh Barhath
- Zorawar Singh Barhath
