= Barhath =

Indian title & surname

Barhath (Devnagari: बारहठ; IAST: Bārahaṭha) (spelled variously as Barhat, Bareth) is an honorific title of the Charans. The title was given to prominent Charans who displayed bravery in war and occupied significant positions in the royal courts in medieval India. It is used as a surname by Charans of Rohadia clan as well as other clans such as Sauda.

== Etymology ==
Barhath is derived from "Dvar-pati" or "Dvar-hath". It translates as 'Guardian of the Gate'.

== History ==
The title 'Barhath' is a synonym of the older term 'Prolpat' or 'Paulpat' which also means 'Guardian of the Gate'. They were described as 'the guardians of Rajput codes of conduct whose poetry and history defined valour, loyalty, and honour'. They oversaw the defense and safety of their Rajput rulers: under siege, they would be the first line of defense at the gate of the fort.

Barhath, a title given to trusted Carans who, during times of siege, stood at the main gates (paul) of forts and were the first to fight and give their lives in its defense.

== Notable people ==
- Narharidas Barhath (1591–1676), renowned 17th-century poet and author of vaishnavite text Avatara Charitra
- Thakur Kesari Singh Barhath (1872–1941), Indian revolutionary leader, freedom fighter, poet, writer and educator from Rajasthan
- Thakur Zorawar Singh Barhath (1883–1939), Indian revolutionary and independence activist; main accomplice in the Delhi conspiracy case, threw the bomb on Lord Hardinge
- Kunwar Pratap Singh Barhath (1893–1918), Indian revolutionary & anti-British activist, accomplice in the Delhi conspiracy case to assassinate Lord Hardinge
- Barhath Kriparam Khidiya (1743–1833), 18th-century Rajasthani poet and writer, known for his verses on ethics called Rajiya ra Soratha
- Suryadev Singh Bareth, Indian advocate, poet, and social worker from Alwar; recipient of Padma Shri (1971) for his contributions to progressive agriculture in the region during Green Revolution
- Narayan Bareth, veteran Indian journalist and political analyst; former State Information Commissioner of Rajasthan (2020–2022) and Professor of Journalism at University of Rajasthan (2016–2017) and Haridev Joshi University of Journalism and Mass Communication (2013–2016)
