= Suryadev Singh Bareth =

Indian advocate, poet, and social worker

Pradhan of Kishangarh Bas Panchayat Samiti

Personal details
- Party: Indian National Congress
- Parent: Balwant Singh Bareth
- Education: LLB
- Occupation: Advocate; poet; farmer; politician
- Awards: Padma Shri (1971)

Suryadev Singh Bareth is an Indian advocate, poet, and social worker from Alwar, Rajasthan.

== Biography ==
For his contributions to progressive agriculture in the region during Green Revolution, he was awarded the Padma Shri in 1971. Bareth is also a long-time leader of the Indian National Congress active in local body politics. He served as Pradhan of Kishangarh Bas Panchayat samiti. He has composed poems in both Rajasthani as well as Hindi.

In 2019, Bareth highlighted farmers contribution and stated that if the government waives off farmers' debts, it is not a favor but their right. He also highlighted that the cost of farming with stagnant crop prices, leading to farmer disenchantment. Singh urged politicians to prioritize honesty and transparency while advocating for farmers' rights. He expressed concern over the rising number of farmer suicides in the country and requested that the government take steps to reduce the cost of farming, improve irrigation facilities, and create a scientific roadmap for agriculture.

Bareth remains optimistic despite criticism and believes that India has made great progress in the past 70 years of democracy. He notes the devolution of power to districts and villages, the erosion of caste from social life, and the positive role of various institutions such as the Election Commission of India. Suryadev Singh is a renowned poet and often takes part in literary seminars and conferences. His compositions also include ghazals.

== Awards ==
- Padma Shri (1971) for progressive agriculture
- Amar Shaheed Pratap Puraskar (2014) for literary contributions
- Alwar Gaurav (2015)

== See also ==
- Chandi Dan Detha
- Bareth
