= Kesari Singh Barhath =

Indian revolutionary leader (1872–1941)

Thakur Kesari Singh Barhath
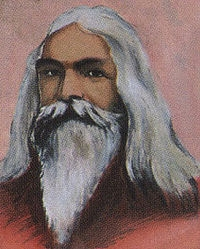
- Born: 21 November 1872; Devpura, Shahpura State
- Died: 14 August 1941 (aged 68)
- Other name: Rajasthan Kesari
- Occupations: Chief Counselor to Maharana of Mewar (Udaipur State); Superintendent of Ethnography of Kota State
- Known for: Revolutionary activities against the British Raj
- Notable work: Chetavani ra Chungatya
- Movement: Indian independence movement
- Criminal penalty: Life imprisonment
- Spouse: Manik Kanwar
- Children: 4, including Kunwar Pratap Singh Barhath
- Relatives: Thakur Zorawar Singh Barhath (brother)

Thakur Kesari Singh Barhath (21 November 1872 – 14 August 1941) was an Indian revolutionary leader, freedom fighter, and educator from the state of Rajasthan. He was the Chief Counselor to Maharana of Mewar (Udaipur State). He was the patriarch of the Souda Barhath family, members of which (including his son Kunwar Pratap Singh Barhath and his brother Thakur Zorawar Singh Barhath) participated in anti-British activities Barhath was also known as Rajasthan Kesari.

He is known for dissuading Maharana Fateh Singh from attending the 1903 Delhi Durbar with Chetavani ra Chungatya, his Dingal (Old Western Rājasthāni) work. Barhath founded Veer Bharat Sabha, a revolutionary organisation based in Rajasthan, and co-founded Rajasthan Seva Sangh and Rajputana-Madhya Bharat Sabha. He wrote extensively about nationalism and independence, and wrote poetry in Dingal.

== Life and education ==
Barhath was born in Charan caste on 21 November 1872 on a jagir in the former Shahpura State. His father, Thakur Krishna Singh Barhath, was a counsellor to the Maharana of Mewar. Barhath spent his early childhood in Shahpura. At age eight, he joined his father in Udaipur.

He was a scholar of Dingal, Sanskrit, Bengali, Marathi, Gujarati, Hindu scriptures, astronomy, history, ancient Indian philosophy, and Indian and European history. By 1889, at age 18, he had completed his education.

Barhath married Manik Kanwar, sister of Kaviraja Devidan of the Kotdi estate in Kota, the following year. His son Kunwar Pratap Singh was born in 1893, and he lived in the Kaviraja Shyamaldas haveli in Udaipur.

== Career ==
In 1891, Barhath began working for Maharana Fateh Singh with his father. Because of political interference by the British in the administration, he left the service two years later.

In 1900, a few years after leaving Udaipur, Barhath was invited by Kota ruler Maharao Ummed Singh to serve in his court. He was appointed the ethnography superintendent of Kota State two years later, a position he held until 1907. Barhath, established the Maharao Bhim Singh Public Library in Kota, which the city's municipal corporation currently operates.

In 1903, British viceroy Lord Curzon held a Delhi Durbar to commemorate the coronation of Edward VII. All Indian kings were required to attend the ceremony to demonstrate their loyalty to the British Empire. Barhath composed Chetavani ra Chungatya, a collection of 13 couplets urging Mewar Maharana Fateh Singh not to attend the Delhi Durbar. He wrote about the tradition of Maharana's noble ancestors who never became part of the Mughal Empire (Durbar), and the importance and the respect the throne of Mewar had in Indian eyes. Influenced by the verses, the maharana returned from Delhi without attending the Durbar.

== Revolutionary activities ==
Between 1900 and 1914, Barhath developed an increasingly hostile view of British rule in India. Noting the subservience of native rulers to the British Raj, he believed that by encouraging soldiers, Rajputs, Charans and other martial groups in Rajputana to take up arms, the region could free itself of the British; the revolution would then spread to the rest of India. Barhath found like-minded friends in Arjunlal Sethi of Jaipur and Rao Gopal Singh Kharwa, and later contacted revolutionaries such as Bal Gangadhar Tilak, Ras Bihari Bose and Sachindra Nath Sanyal in other parts of India. He joined the Revolutionary Party.

Walterkrit Hitkarini Sabha, with the efforts of Kaviraja Shyamaldas, was founded in 1880 and chaired by Rajputana agent to the governor-general Colonel Walter. With branches throughout the region, annual conferences were held but more was needed. Barhath attempted to improve its central organisation. At the 1905 conference, he proposed that the Rajputra Hitkarini Sabha be Rajput-controlled and free of British influence. Barhath insisted on the use of Hindi for the sabhā's proceedings, with a focus on education. From 1905 to 1913, he communicated with officers in Rajputana, kshatriyas, and jagirdars to advocate caste reform and the end of outdated traditions such as tika. Barhath wrote articles in Hindi and English on the origin of tika and its ill effects.

From 1904 to 1913, Barhath attempted to promote national education. In his view, English-medium colleges such as Mayo College in Ajmer – where Rajputana's feudal ruling class sent its children – developed an inferiority complex in its students. Barhath wanted to promote nationalist education, in which students learn about their country's history and culture. In January 1904, his proposal for a kshatriya college in Ajmer was approved; however, fear of British retribution prevented its implementation.

Barhath considered Italy's Giuseppe Mazzini his political guru. Hindutva supremacist Vinayak Damodar Savarkar wrote Mazzini's biography in Marathi while studying in London, and secretly sent it to Bal Gangadhar Tilak because the book was banned by the British. Barhath translated Savarkar's biography of Mazzini into Hindi.

In 1910, Barhath founded Veer Bharat Sabha. At the beginning of World War I in 1914, he prepared for armed revolution by sending a parcel of cartridges to insurgents in Banaras and contacting soldiers in the princely states and the British army.

In British intelligence reports, Barhath was considered particularly responsible for fomenting revolution in Rajputana. In 1912, he topped the National Archives of India list of people monitored by the CID.

To raise funds, revolutionaries headed by Barhath found a wealthy, corrupt mahant from Jodhpur. Barhath ordered him to be brought to Kota (where he was killed), and was arrested in Shahpura on 21 March 1914 for sedition, conspiracy and murder. During his trial, the ruler of Shahpura State confiscated his property. Barhath was sentenced to 20 years' imprisonment and sent to Hazaribagh Central Jail in Bihar. There he vowed not to eat solid food and subsisted only on milk.

After World War I, many political prisoners (including Barhath, Arjun Lal Sethi and Gopal Singh Kharwa) were released in a general amnesty. After his release in April 1920, he resumed denouncing India's British rulers and wrote to the governor-general of Abu proposing responsible government in Rajasthan and India's princely states. His plan called for a bicameral Rajasthan General Assembly, with one chamber representing landlords and lesser nobility and the other peasants and merchants. Barhath's proposed assembly should attempt to promote all-around development, without government greed. India's Director of Criminal Intelligence said about him,

Gopal Singh and Kesari Singh were mixed up with the seditionists in British India and were furthering plots and conspiracies directly affecting British India. When the Thakur (Kesari Singh) was called upon to explain he spun out an evasive statement mouth after mouth, and meanwhile continued his plotting, and remained in possession of an extraordinary arsenal of firearms and ammunition.

Barhath's son, Kunwar Pratap Singh Barhath, was arrested for conspiring to manufacture bombs and sentenced to five years' imprisonment in 1916. After being tortured when he refused to reveal his fellow revolutionaries, he died in prison on 7 May 1917. In 1919, Barhath returned to Kota from prison. Asked when he heard about his son's death, he replied, "Just now".

In 1920-21, Barhath moved to Wardha at the invitation of Seth Jamnalal Bajaj. A weekly newspaper named for him (Rajasthan Kesari) was edited by Vijay Singh Pathik, and Barhath had contact with Mahatma Gandhi. Barhath and Arjun Lal Sethi were active contributors. It became a mouthpiece for the Rajasthan Seva Sangh and its sister organisation, the Rajputana Madhya Bharat Sabha.

At Gandhi's suggestion, Barhath founded Rajasthan Seva Sangh in Wardha with Arjunlal Sethi and Vijay Singh Pathik. They moved the sabha to Ajmer (a British province in Rajputana) a year later, and had branches in Kota, Jaipur and Jodhpur. The organisation's objectives were:

1. to obtain redress of public grievances;
2. to support rightful claims by rulers and jagirdars, and
3. to create friendly relations with the jagirdars.

During the 1920s, the sabha was the leading organisation supporting the Bijolia movement in Rajasthan. Abuses committed by police in Bundi, Sirohi, and Udaipur were reported in the Rajasthan Kesari. Barhath also contributed to the later Navin Rajasthan and Tarun Rajasthan weeklies. In 1920, Rajputana Madhya Bharat Sabha was founded by Barhath with Gopal Singh Kharwa and Arjunlal Sethi to promote political liberty in Rajasthan.

== Death ==
Barhath died on 14 August 1941.

== Works ==
1. Chetawani ra Chungatiya (13 couplets addressed to Maharana Fateh Singh)
2. Kavya-Kusumanjali (based on pun, presented to Lord Curzon)
3. Hindi translation of Buddhacharita by Asvaghosa
4. Hindi translation of the biography of Giuseppe Mazzini
5. Roothi Rani

== Legacy ==
Barhath and other members of his family are part of the secondary-school syllabus of the RBSC board in Rajasthan. The Kesari Singh Barhath Colony is on the Shahpura-Bhilwara road in Bhilwara, Rajasthan.

In November 2022, Rajasthan Chief Minister Ashok Gehlot approved a proposal of ₹4 crore for a panorama of Barath in Shahpura in Bhilwara. It will include a main panorama building, boundary wall, path-way, auditorium, library, audio-video system, artworks, a statue and an inscription. The panorama will provide information about Barhath's work and life and inform visitors about their rights.

Since 1974, Shaeed Mela has been celebrated on 23 December in memory of the Barhath family; on that date in 1912, Thakur Zorawar Singh Barhath attempted to assassinate the British Viceroy of India. A fair takes place in Shahpura, and Shaeed Mela is at the Shahid Trimurti Memorial. The memorial has statues of Barhath, Zorawar Singh, and Kunwar Pratap Singh. The event is hosted by MPs, MLAs, and local politicians. In January 2019, portraits of the three Barhath family revolutionaries (Kesari, Zorawar and Pratap) were hung in the gallery of the Delhi Assembly.

Barhath's haveli in Shahpura is protected by the government of Rajasthan, and became the Shri Kesari Singh Barhath Government Museum in 2018 (the 100th anniversary of Pratap's death). The museum, which contains the family's weapons and armaments, was dedicated by Onkar Singh Lakahwat and Kailash Meghwal.

== Gallery ==
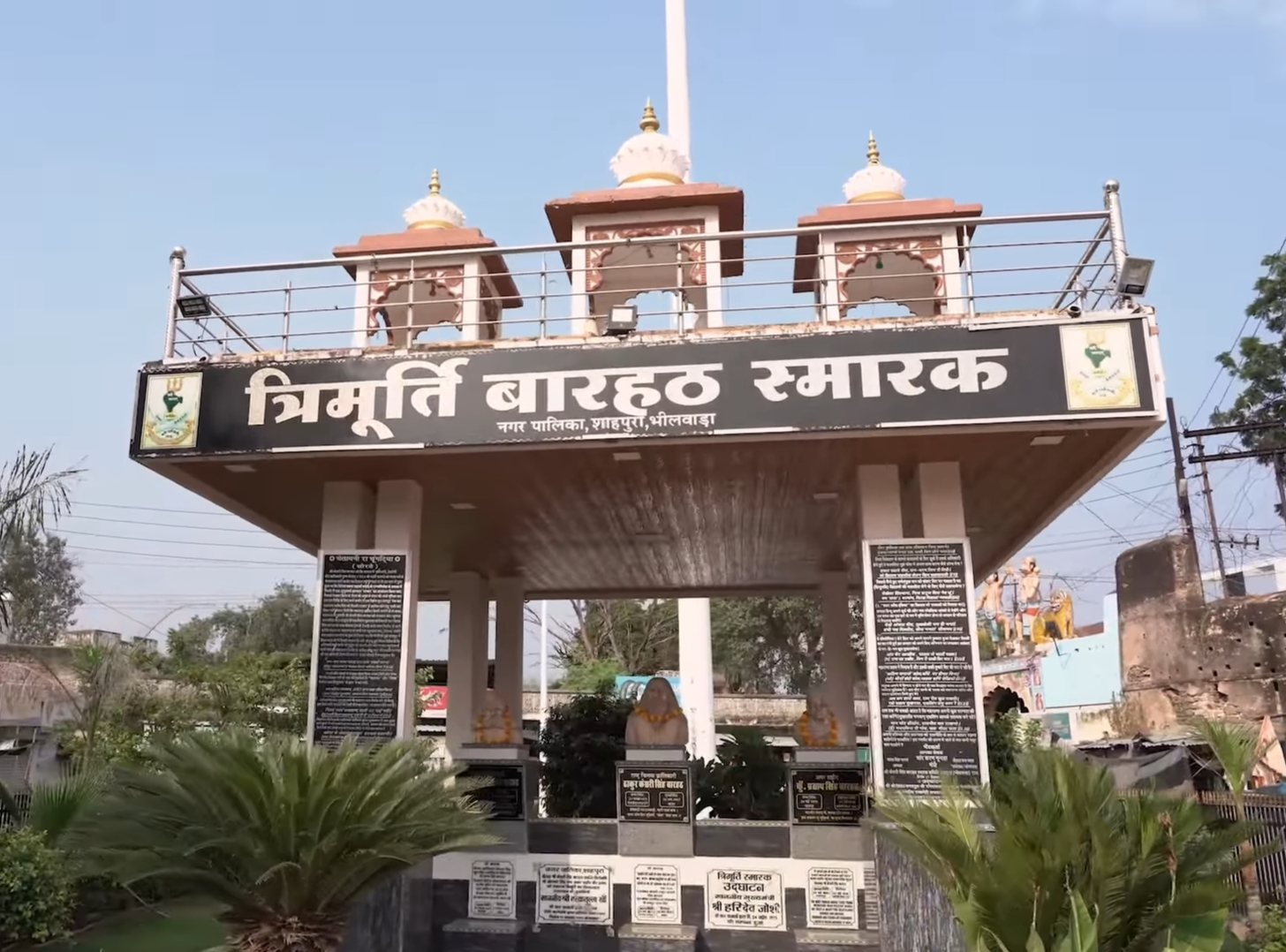
Trimurti barhath smarak at Shahpura bhilwara

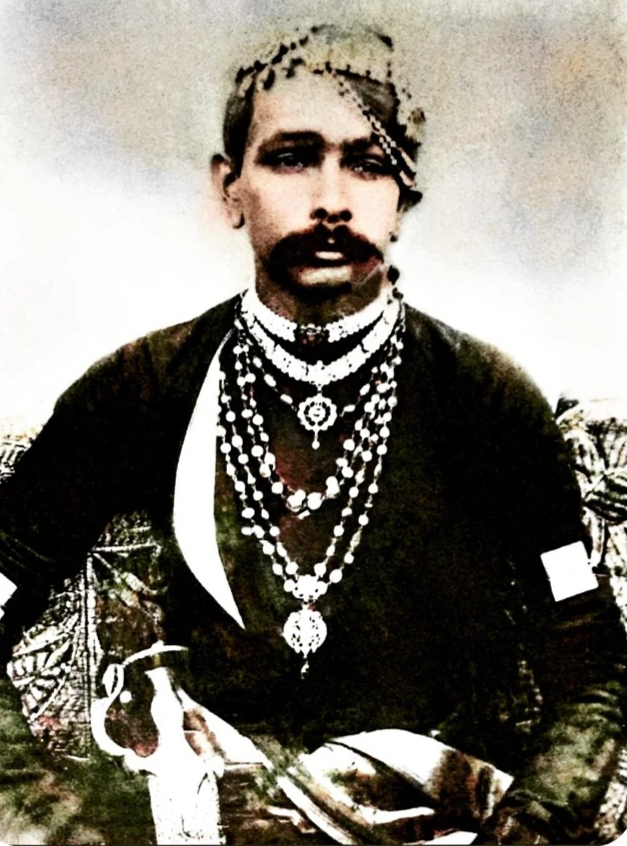
rare photo of Thakur kesari singh barhath in Shahpura museum

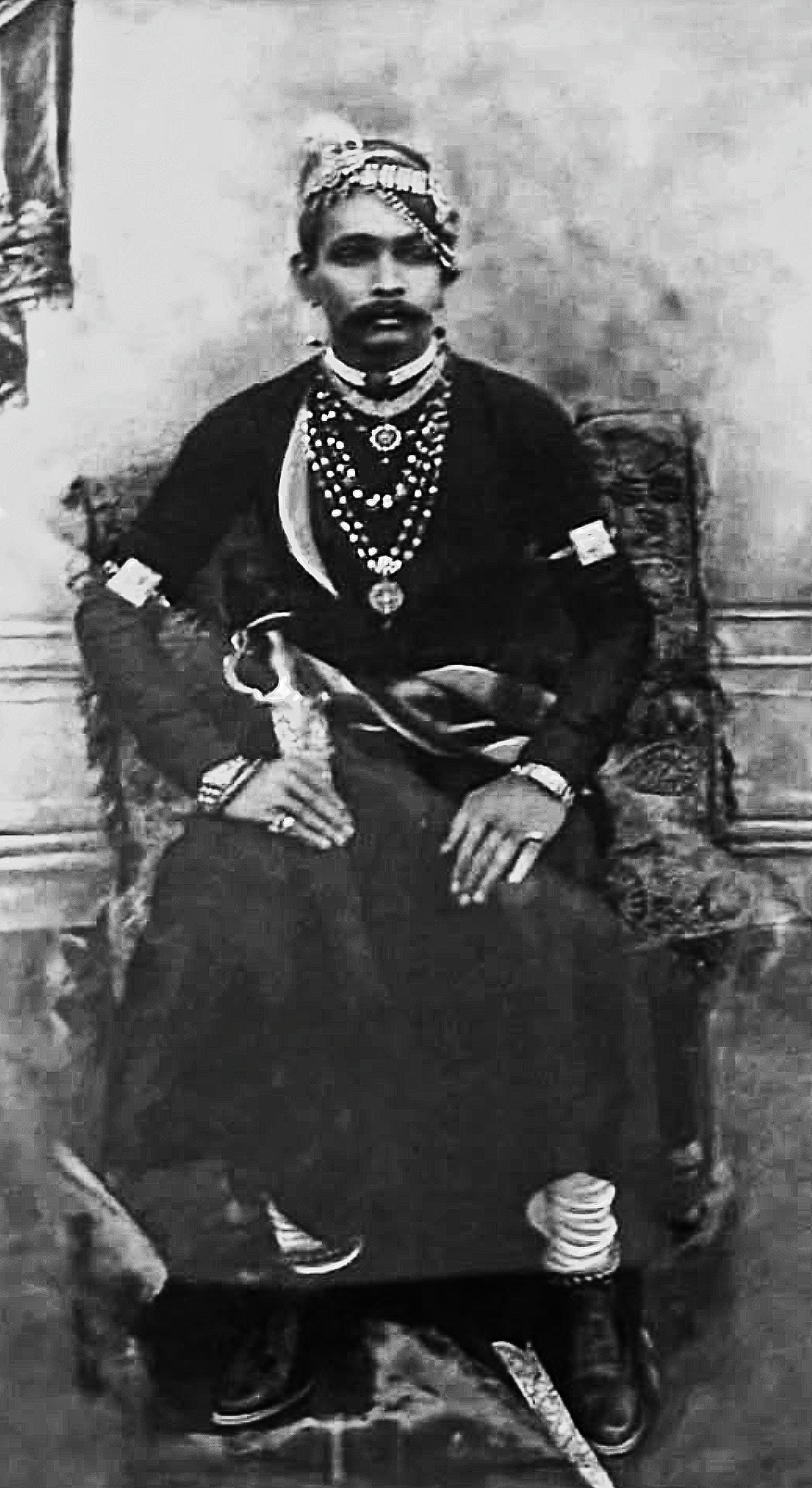
photo of revolutionary Thakur kesari singh barhath when he was young,barhath museum Shahpura, bhilwara

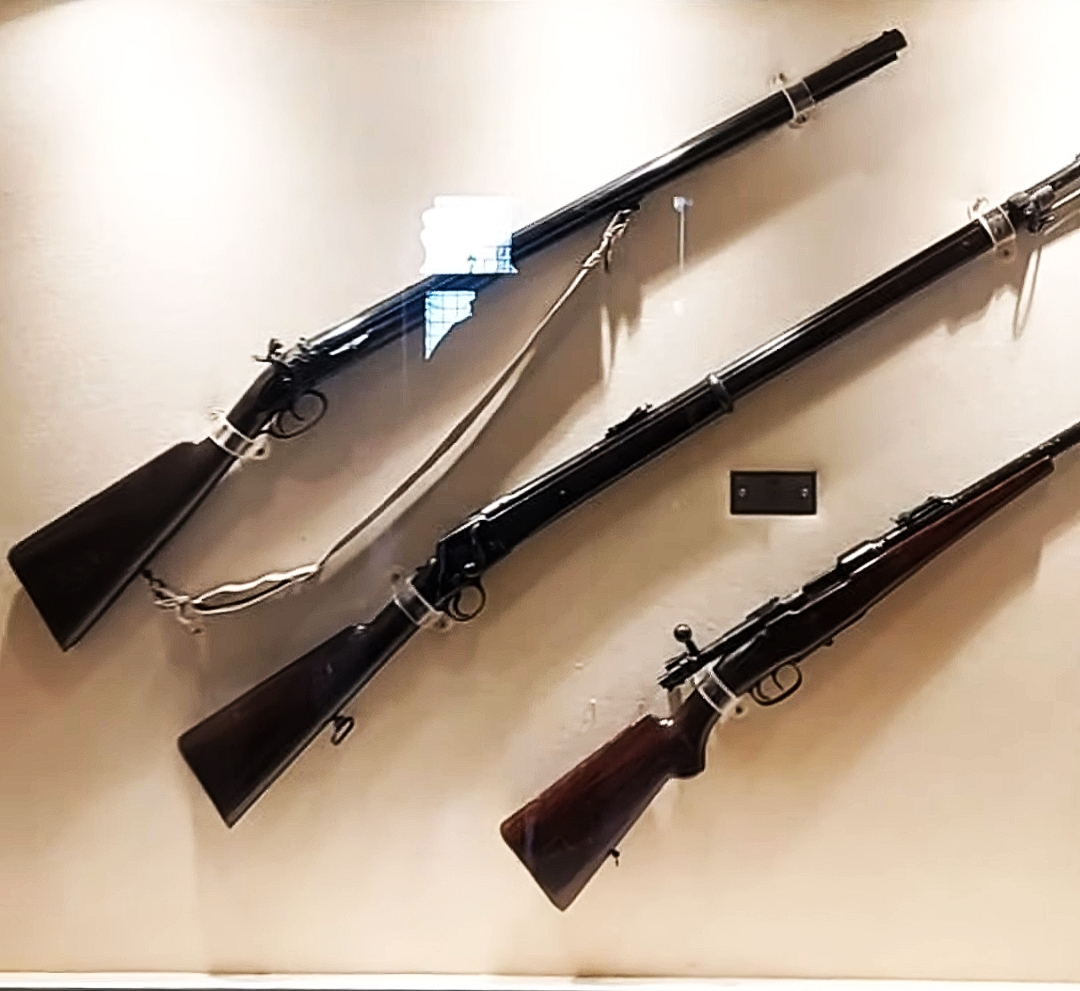
guns used by revolutionary barhath family

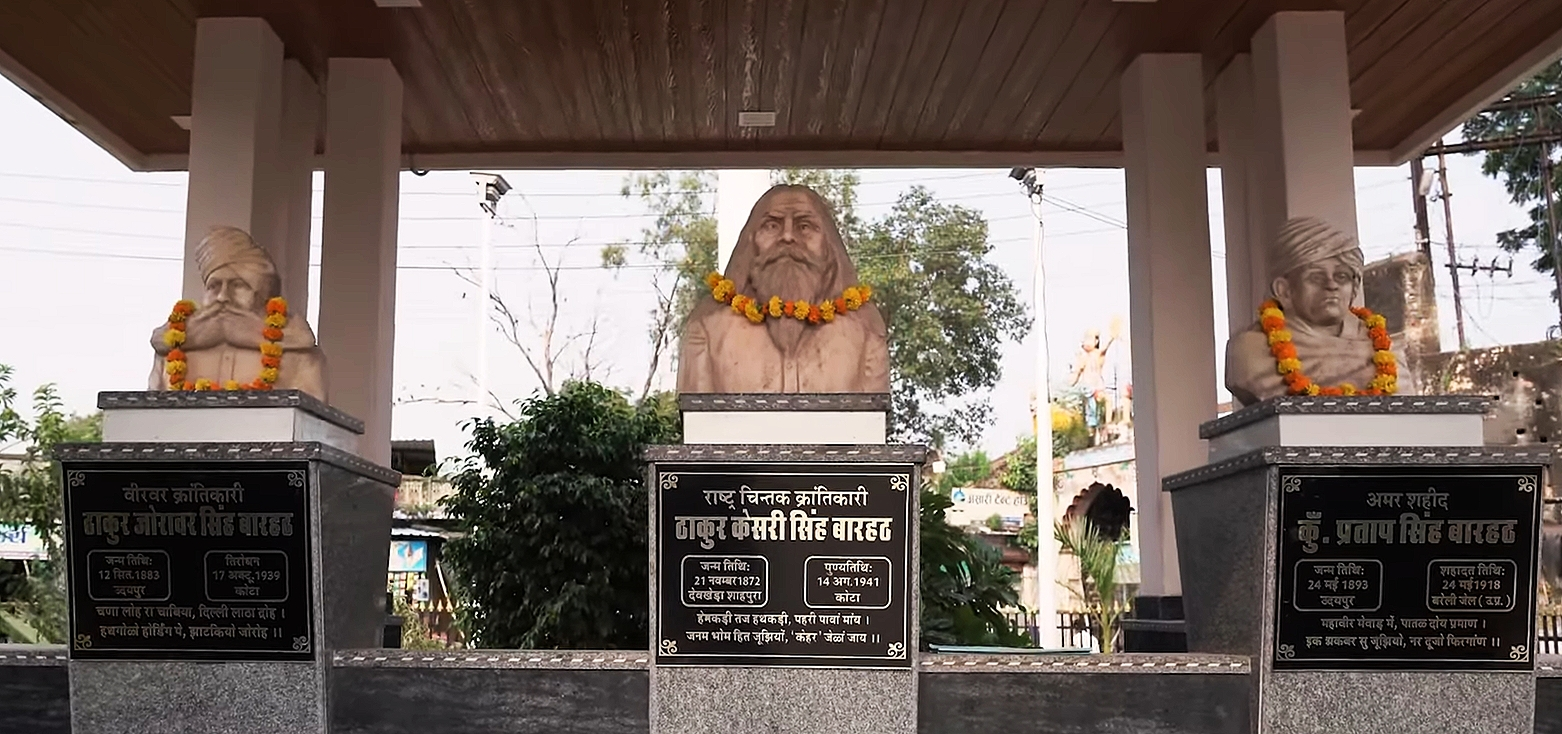
stone statue of barhath Trimurti Shahpura

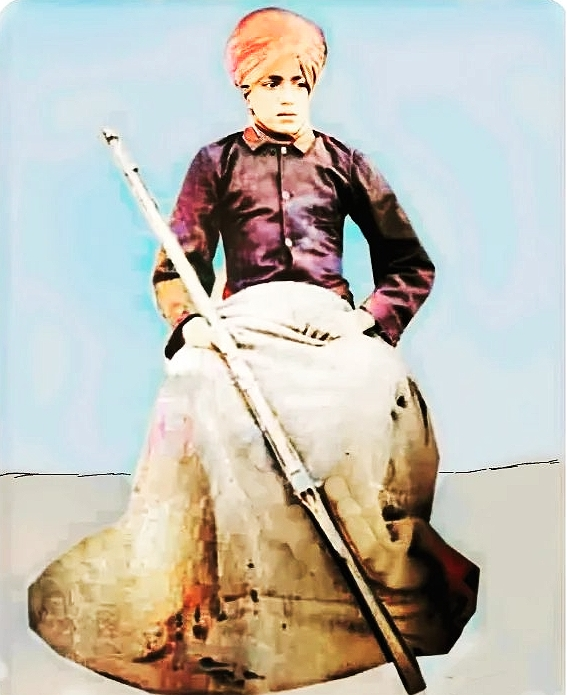
rare photos of ishwar dan ashiya (son in law of kesari singh barhath

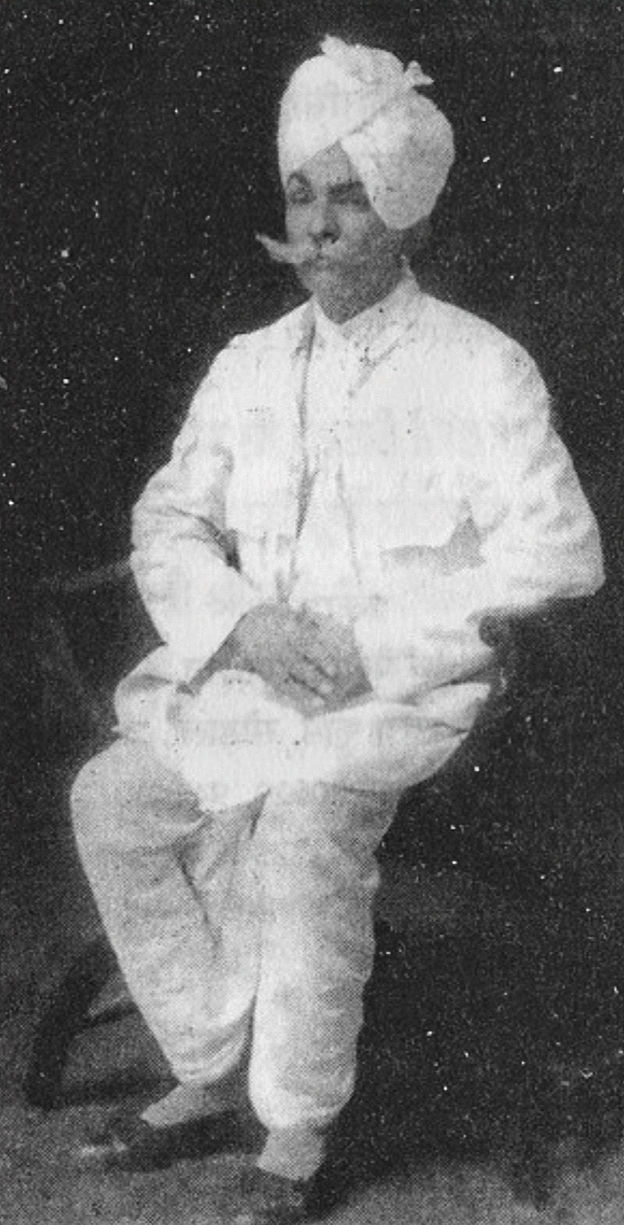
Portrait of Thakur kesari singh barhath

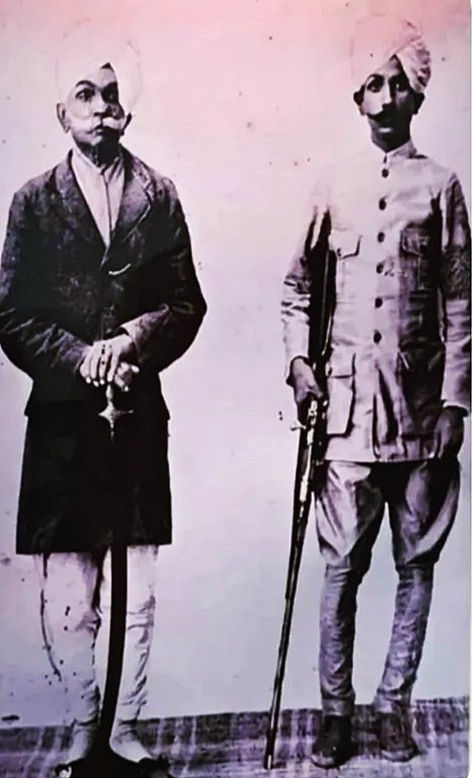
rare photo of kesari singh barhath and his youngest son ranjeet singh barhath

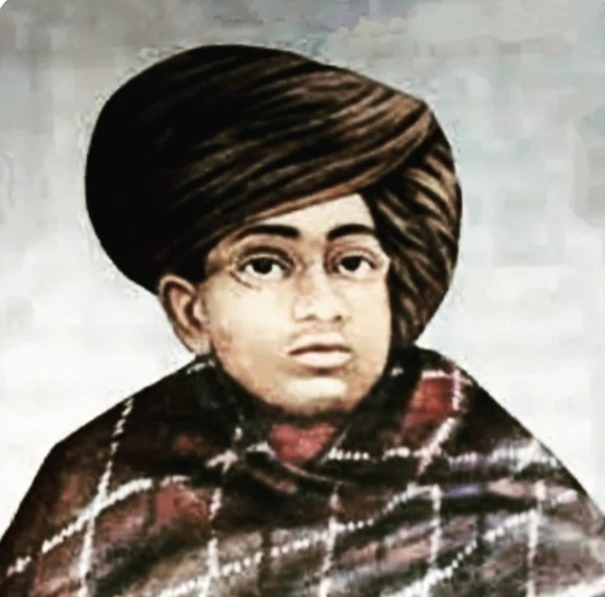
portrait of pratap singh barhat

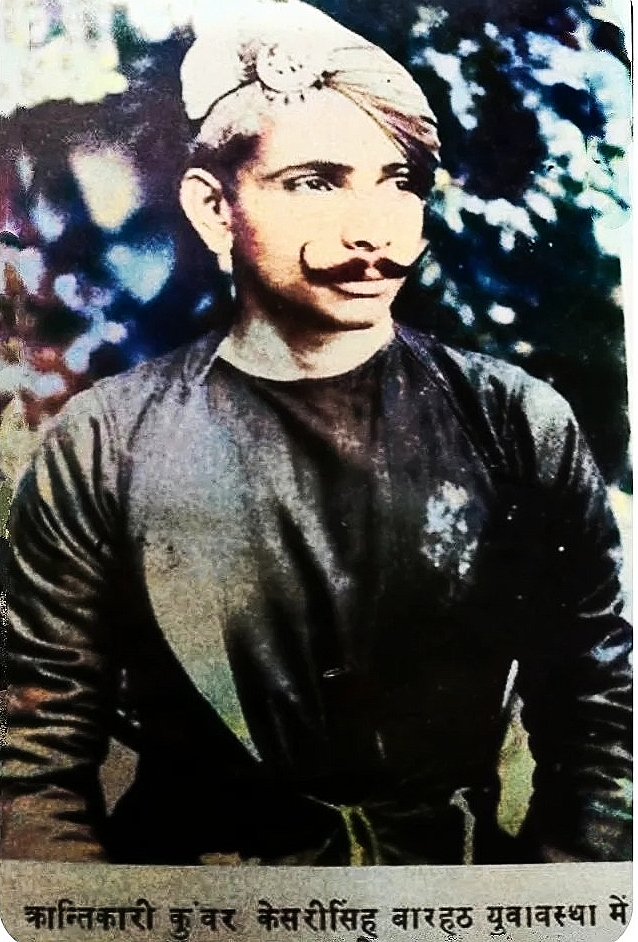
rare photo of kesari singh barhath

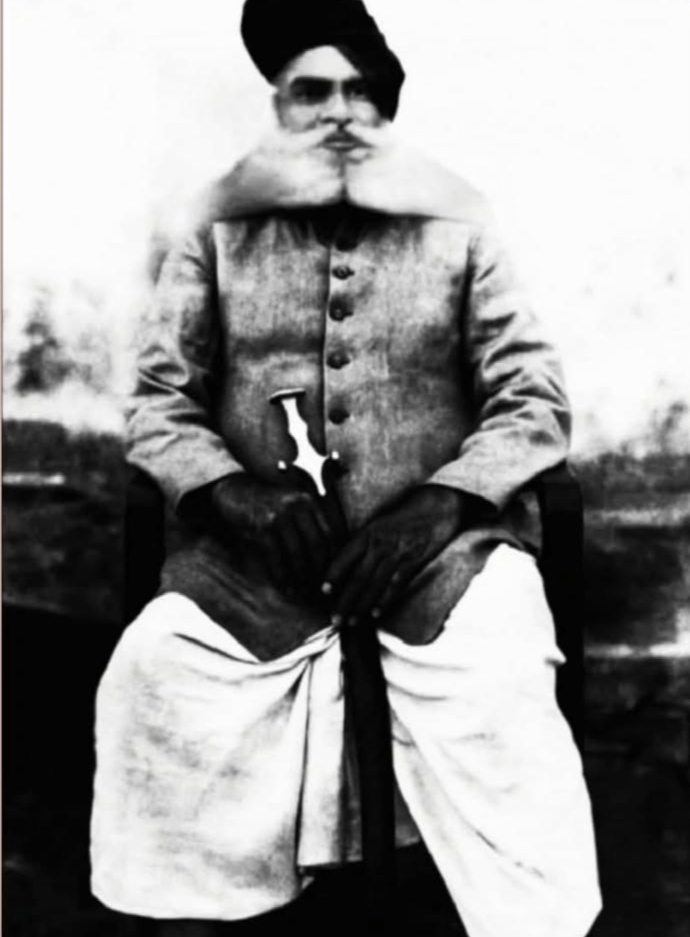
portrait of zorawar singh barhath

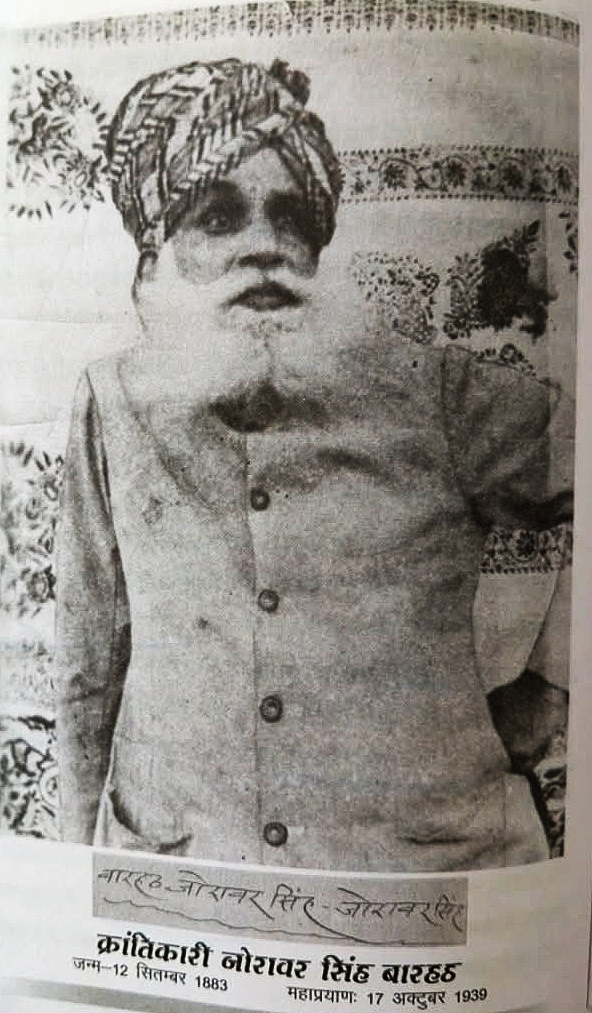
old photo of zorawar singh barhath

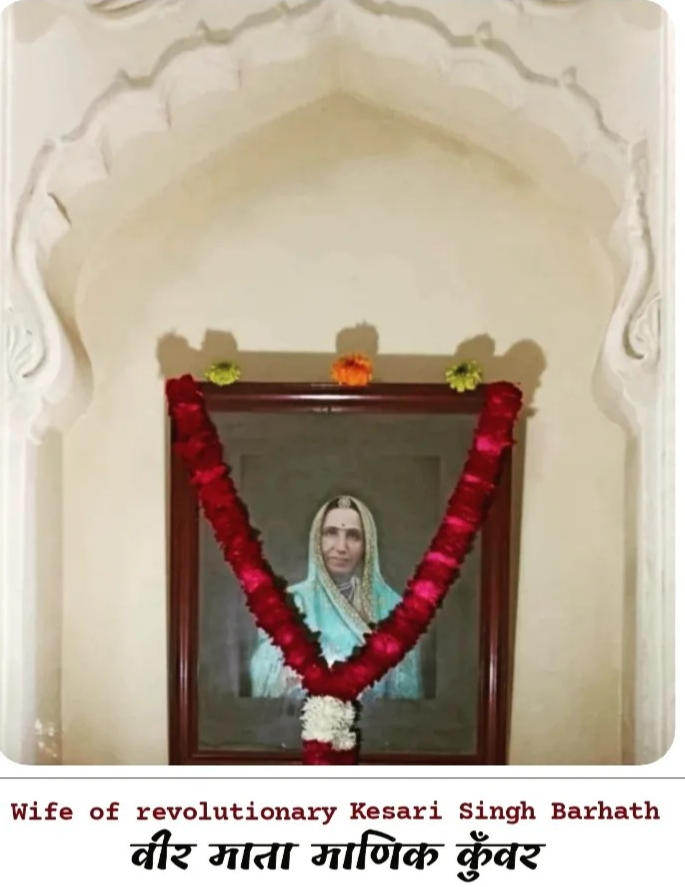
rare photo of veer mata manik kanwar (wife of kesari singh barhath
