= Kunwar Pratap Singh Barhath =

Indian independence activist (1893–1918)

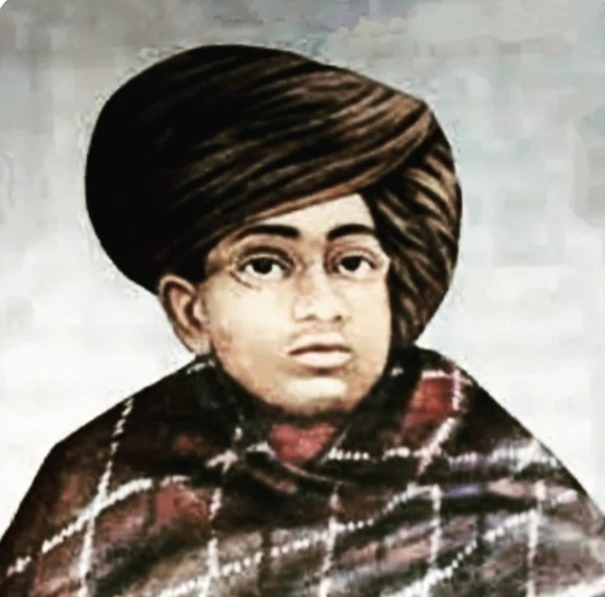
- Born: 24 May 1893; Udaipur, Mewar
- Died: 24 May 1918 (aged 25); Bareilly Central Jail, British India
- Other name: Kunwar Ji
- Occupation: Revolutionary
- Movement: Indian independence movement
- Criminal penalty: 5 years Rigorous Imprisonment
- Parents: Thakur Kesari Singh Barhath (father); Manik Kanwar (mother)
- Relatives: Thakur Kishore Singh Barhath; Thakur Zorawar Singh Barhath (Uncles) Baisa Chandramani; Thakur Ranjeet Singh Barhath; Baisa Saubhagyamani(Siblings)

Kunwar Pratap Singh Barhath (24 May 1893 – 24 May 1918), also known as ‘Kunwar Ji’, was an Indian Revolutionary against the British government. He led the Benaras Conspiracy, part of the larger Ghadar Movement, in the armed rebellion of 1915 against the British Raj. In 1916, he was arrested and imprisoned in the Banaras Conspiracy Case and sentenced to five years in jail. Subjected to brutal physical torture to weaken him, he refused to divulge the names of other co-conspirators and died on 24 May 1918.

Singh was part of the celebrated Sauda Barhath family of Shahpura State (now in Bhilwara district) whose members were prominent revolutionary leaders in the freedom struggle against the British Raj. Thakur Krishna Singh Barhath, his sons Thakur Kesari Singh Barhath and Thakur Zorawar Singh Barhath and grandson Kunwar Pratap Singh Barhath (son of Thakur Kesari Singh) took part in the freedom struggle and devoted their lives and belongings for the cause of Indian independence.

== Early life ==
Kunwar Pratap Singh was born on 24 May 1893 in Udaipur at Kaviraja Shyamaldas Haveli. He was a member of the affluent Barhath family who were aristocrats in Rajputana and jagirdars of Devpura (Shahpura State). At the time, Pratap's father, Thakur Kesari Singh Barhath, was serving as Chief Counsellor to the Maharana of Mewar. He was later invited to join the court of the Maharaja of Kota State, where he served as a member of the council. Hence, Pratap's childhood was spent in Kota.

Thakur Kesari Singh Barhath was a high priority of British CID (Crime Investigation Department) to be monitored at all times. He encouraged Pratap Singh.

Pratap Singh completed his education at Herbert High School Kota and later at DAV High School, Ajmer.

In his father's view, English-medium colleges like Mayo College Ajmer, where the feudal and ruling class of Rajputana sent their children to study, were creating an inferiority complex among the students. He wished to promote nationalist education in which the students learned about the history and culture of their nation. Therefore, Pratap was sent at a young age to Arjunlal Sethi who ran 'Vardhman Pathshala' in Jaipur which secretly gave training in revolutionary activities. Later, Pratap was introduced to Rash Behari Bose. When the school moved to Indore, Kesari Singh thought it best send Pratap to Delhi. Although Kesari Singh was in a high position in the native states, he was also secretly connected to the Revolutionary Party. Thus, he sent his younger brother, Thakur Zoravar Singh Barath, his son Pratap and son-in-law Ishwar Dan Ashiya to Master Amirchand, another nationalist, in Delhi.

== Training ==
In Delhi, Amirchand had trained Pratap for revolutionary activities, including disguise, collecting secret news from government offices, and establishing contacts with soldiers and youths. Amirchand was impressed by Singh, recommending to Bose that he be given responsibility for the Revolutionary Party in Rajasthan.

== Revolutionary Party ==
Amirchand introduced Singh to Bose as a highly trustworthy, capable, and brave person. Bose inducted him to the Revolutionary Party and he became a prominent member and Bose's right-hand man. He had a leading part in revolutionary projects in Delhi, United Provinces, and Rajasthan. In Rajasthan, he took steps to inspire the soldiers in Ajmer and other British Army cantonments to lead them to revolt against the British.

The 20 year-old Singh began travelling to prepare people for the freedom struggle.

== Escape from Delhi ==
Pratap Singh and Zoravar Singh had to escape Delhi and they came to the banks of Yamuna. They couldn't cross at the time since there was flooding in the river. For seven hours, Pratap Singh sometimes swam, sometimes dived and sometimes hanged by the chains of the bridge. When it got dark enough, they swam across the river. Pratap Singh was very tired, when he reached the shore, and fell unconscious. Two police constables who saw him crossing became suspicious of him. Zoravar Singh slashed both of them with his sword and carried Pratap Singh on his back.

When Zorawar Singh & Pratap Singh left from Delhi after throwing the bomb, they walked about forty miles in a day. A spy followed them from there. After a few days, when they were leaving the border of Banswara, the spy alerted the Nakadar and told him to catch them. Zoravar Singh immediately razed that Nakadar with his sword and both of them fled from there.

== Preparation for Armed Rebellion-Ghadar(1915) ==
Singh secretly started fomenting rebellion among the Rajput soldiers. He moved from place to place, sometimes in Rajputana, sometimes in Punjab and sometimes in Hyderabad in South India. He and his brother-in-law, Ishwar Dan Asiya, were arrested by the police in the Delhi conspiracy, but were freed due to lack of evidence. On the other hand, his father, Thakur Kesari Singh Barhath, was tried in the Kota Murder Case and was sentenced to life imprisonment in 1914. Meanwhile, his uncle Zoravar Singh had been sentenced to death in the Arrah conspiracy but had escaped. The properties of both Kesari and Zoravar were confiscated.

After the bombings in Delhi, Bose had moved to Kashi and from there to Navadvipa. Hiding there, they were trying to successfully implement the plan of rebellion. Singh avoided the presence of British military and police to join Bose. It was decided that on 21 February 1915, an armed rebellion would be signalled from Benaras. During this time, the members of the team would contact the military cantonments and collect a large amount of guns and other armaments. Taking advice from Bose, Singh moved to Rajasthan and started working according to the plan.

== Conspiracy to assassinate Reginald Craddock ==
In 1914, after the arrests of his father and other prominent figures, the leadership fell onto Singh. He collaborated with dissident soldiers of the British Indian Army in a conspiracy to murder Sir Reginald Craddock, a member of the British Government of India. His murder was supposed to be a signal to Meerut and other garrisons of the Indian Army, part of an armed rebellion against the British. Singh was entrusted with the assassination, which came to nothing because Craddock failed to appear.

The revolutionaries of the Ghadar Party of Punjab received information that the British Government had come to know about their plan for rebellion, so they decided to change the date but this information could not reach Sachindra Nath Sanyal in time. As per the predetermined schedule, on 21 February 1915, Sanyal along with his associates reached the Parade Ground in Benaras, but the prepared police force present there surrounded them and started arresting them. A total of 25 arrests were made including Sanyal. Meanwhile, Bose feld to Japan. Sanyal was sentenced to life imprisonment. 16 revolutionaries, including Ranveer Singh and Gurcharan Kar, were tried under the Defense of India Act. This trial came to be known as Benaras Conspiracy Case.

== Escape to Sindh ==
Soon, as the Benaras Conspiracy Case progressed, arrest warrants against Singh were issued. He evaded the police and continued his secret work travelling around Rajasthan to consolidate the revolutionary organisation. When his father was imprisoned for life, Singh sent a message to him in jail to assure him that he should not worry.

Singh escaped to Hyderabad in Sindh, where he disguised himself and worked as a compounder in a dispensary. He continued to instill in the youth the spirit of revolution and patriotism. On one hand, the police were looking for him, while on the other hand, his fellow revolutionaries also started searching for him amongst his acquaintances and relatives. Eventually the revolutionaries were successful and Pratap's associates came to know that he was in Hyderabad (Sindh). But in order to mislead the police, they spread rumors of his presence in Hyderabad (South India). Hence, when police interrogated an Oswal family in Jaipur on the whereabouts of Singh, the family, due to harassment gave an address of Hyderabad, but of the Hyderabad in Deccan, leading police on a blind hunt to South India.

Whereas police went looking for him in Hyderabad (South), the Jaipur associates sent Pratap's accomplice Ram Narayan Chaudhary in Hyderabad (Sindh) to warn Pratap. They wanted Pratap to reach Bikaner and take leadership and organise the revolutionaries there. When Ram Narayan Choudhary arrived in Hyderabad, he heard of a young man preaching nationalism & patriotism to the youth & inciting them for revolution. Afterwards, it didn't take long for Chaudhary to find Pratap. Upon meeting Chaudhary & understanding his associates' intentions, Pratap Singh decided to shift his location back to Rajasthan.

== Betrayal and arrest ==
Singh travelled back towards Rajasthan, stopping at Ashanada Station(Jodhpur) to contact the station master, who was also a part of the group. The station master had been caught by the police a few days earlier and had turned approver to save himself. This led to the arrest of Singh, who was tried for his role in the Benaras Conspiracy and sentenced to five years jail.

== Trial in Benaras Consipiracy Case ==
Kunwar Pratap was tried for his complicity in Benaras Conspiracy Case. On 14 February 1916, he was sentenced to five years of rigorous imprisonment.

After the Delhi Conspiracy case, the sensational trial of Banaras Conspiracy Case started under a three-judge tribunal against persons related to the conspirators. In this tribunal, S. R. Daniel, B. K. Dalal, and Sheetal Prasad Vajpayee were the judges. The Tribunal, while pronouncing its judgment on 7 March 1916, awarded the following punishments to the accused:

1. Pratap Singh Barhath: sentenced to Five years Rigorous Imprisonment.
2. Sachindranath Sanyal: life imprisonment and confiscation of property.
3. Rao Gopal Singh Kharwa: case withdrawn
4. Anand: sentenced to three years rigorous imprisonment
5. Kalipad Mukherjee: sentenced to three years rigorous imprisonment
6. Ganeshi Lal Khasta: imprisoned for seven years
7. Girjababu alias Nagendranath Dutta: sentenced to five years rigorous imprisonment, Rs. 500 fine.
8. Jadunath Singh: acquitted.
9. Jitendranath Sanyal: sentenced to two years rigorous imprisonment.
10. Damodar Swaroop alias Master ji: sentenced to seven years imprisonment.
11. Dharam Singh: acquitted.
12. Nalini Mohan Mookerjee: sentenced to five years rigorous imprisonment.
13. Bankim Chandra Mitra: sentenced to three years rigorous imprisonment.
14. Rabindranath Sanyal: acquitted.
15. Laxmi Narayan: sentenced to five years strict imprisonment.
16. Surendranath Mookerjee: acquitted.

According to the judgment, "Pratap’s services were utilised by the conspirators to get into touch with the disaffected people in Central India and Pratap supported the conspirators."

== Bareilly Central Jail- imprisonment and death ==
Pratap Singh was held in Bareilly Central Jail, where he was mentally and physically tortured in an attempt to get him to divulge the names and whereabouts of other revolutionary activists.

The Intelligence Department of the Government of India was pleased with the imprisonment of Singh. They wanted information on the revolutionary party membership, its plans and regarding who threw the bomb at Hardinge, all of which they thought he would know because he was a confidant of Rashi Bihari Bose and Shachindra Sanyal.

The Director of the Crime Investigation Department, Sir Charles Cleveland came to Bareilly to meet Pratap. He wanted to get the information and whereabouts of his revolutionary colleagues. He tempted Pratap by offering a high position in the government, condoning the twenty years' rigorous imprisonment of his father Thakur Kesari Singh (then at Hazari Bagh jail in Bihar)(imprisoned in 1914), withdrawing the warrant against his uncle Zorawar Singh and returning all the forfeited ancestral properties of the family. Pratap did not budge an inch and refused to betray the revolutionaries. Then they told him that his mother was weeping day and night for him. She would die in agony.

He remained unrepentant, was tortured further and as a result died on 24 May 1918, aged 25.

== Legacy ==
Pratap Singh Barhath along with other members of the Barhath family of Shahpura is taught as part of the secondary syllabus in the RBSC board in Rajasthan.

=== Shaheed Mela ===
Since last 50 years, from 1974 onwards, every year on 23 December, Shaeed Mela is celebrated in memory of the Barhath family. It was on this day that Zorawar Singh hurled a bomb on the British Viceroy of India in 1912. A fair is organized in their hometown at Shahpura and the event takes place at Shahid Trimurti Memorial which displays the statues of Thakur Kesari Singh, Thakur Zorawar Singh, and Kunwar Pratap Singh. The event is presided by the political class including MPs, MLAs, and local politicians.

=== Shri Pratap Singh Barhath Government College ===
Shri Pratap Singh Barhath Government College, Shahpura is a government college in Shahpura, Rajasthan.

=== Portraits in Delhi Assembly ===
In January 2019, portraits of revolutionaries of the Barhath family, including Pratap Singh Barhath, were placed in the gallery of the Delhi Legislative Assembly.

=== Barhath Haveli of Shahpura ===
The haveli of the Barhath family has now become a national museum, in which their personal weapons and armaments are displayed.

=== Pratap Singh Memorial, Asanada ===
Pratap Singh Memorial was constructed at Asanada Railway Station in Jodhpur.
