= Shiv Niwas Palace =

Royal palace in Udaipur, Rajasthan, India

Coordinates: 24.5743288°N 73.6816858°E

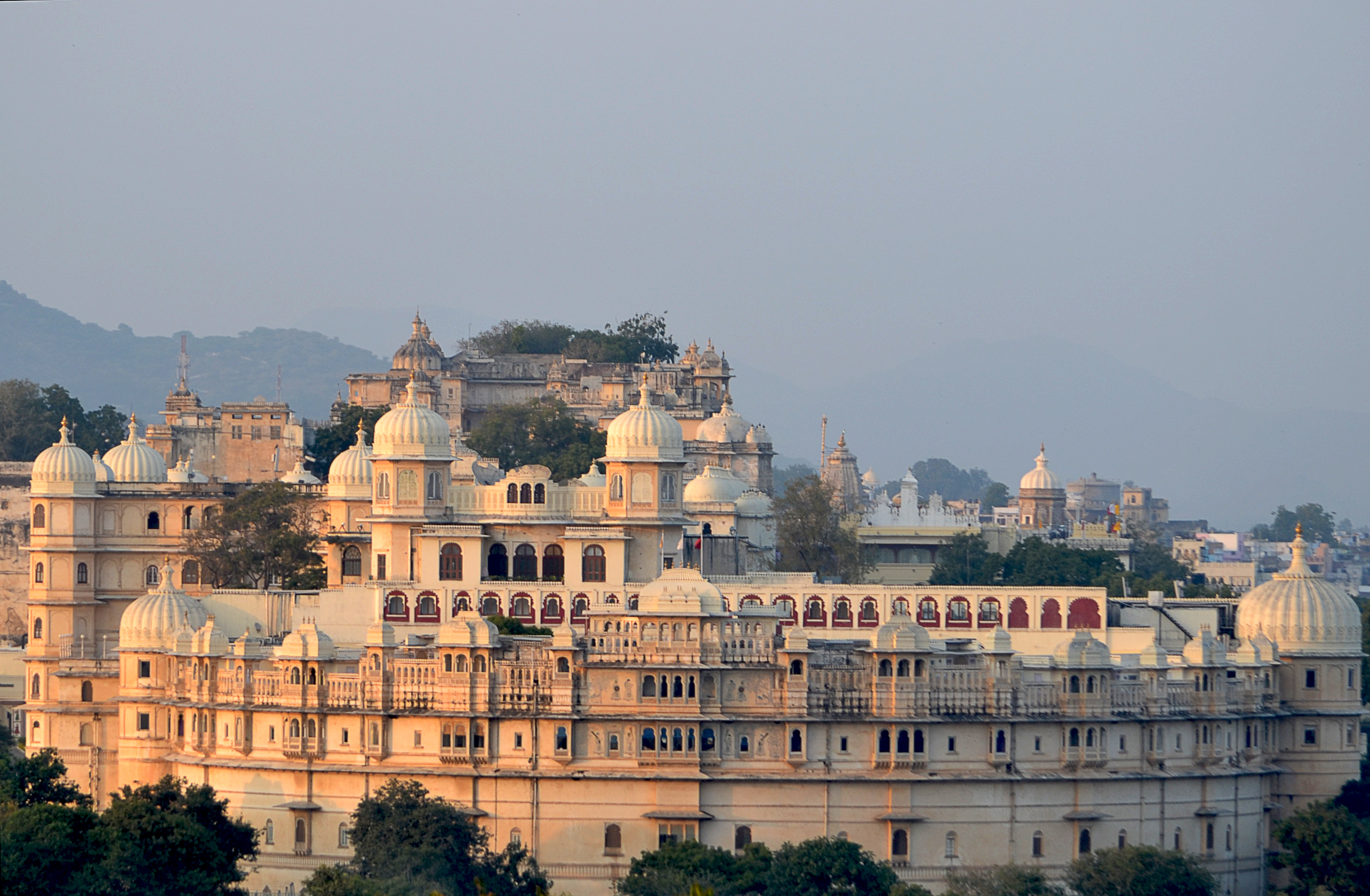
- Shiv Niwas Palace, Udaipur

- Location within Rajasthan

General information
- Architectural style: Rajput architecture
- Location: Udaipur, India

Shiv Niwas Palace is a former residence of the Maharana of Udaipur, Rajasthan, located on the banks of Lake Pichola.

== Guesthouse ==
Located to the south side of and part of the City Palace complex, work on this building was begun by Maharana Sajjan Shambhu Singh (1874 to 1884) and finished by his successor Maharana Fateh Singh at the beginning of the 20th century as a royal guesthouse.

During its time as a guesthouse it hosted a number of royal gatherings and VIP visits from all over the world, including George V of the United Kingdom in 1905, and Edward the Prince of Wales.

By the time that Bhagwat Singh succeeded to the throne of Mewar in 1955, it was becoming increasing difficult for the royal family to afford the cost of maintaining the large numbers of royal residences that they owned, in particular the city palace. Following his success in converting the Lake Palace into an income generating hotel he decided to also convert the Shiv Niwas and the smaller Fateh Prakash Palace into luxury heritage hotels. After a 4 year long period of conversion the Shiv Niwas opened as a hotel in 1982.

== Hotel ==
The 3 levels of the palace are arranged in a semicircular arc around an internal courtyard in the middle of which is a marble pool. Balconies and rooftop terraces opening off different rooms enjoy views to the south of the gardens laid below the dam wall of Lake Pichola; while to the west, the island resorts of Jag Mandir and the Lake Palace. The building is of ancient Rajput architectural styles. The interior features ivory and mother-of-pearl inlay work, glass mosaics and frescoes, many of them produced by Khaja Ustadh and Kundan Lal, whom the Maharana had sent to England to learn the art of glass-mosaic design and to study fresco painting.

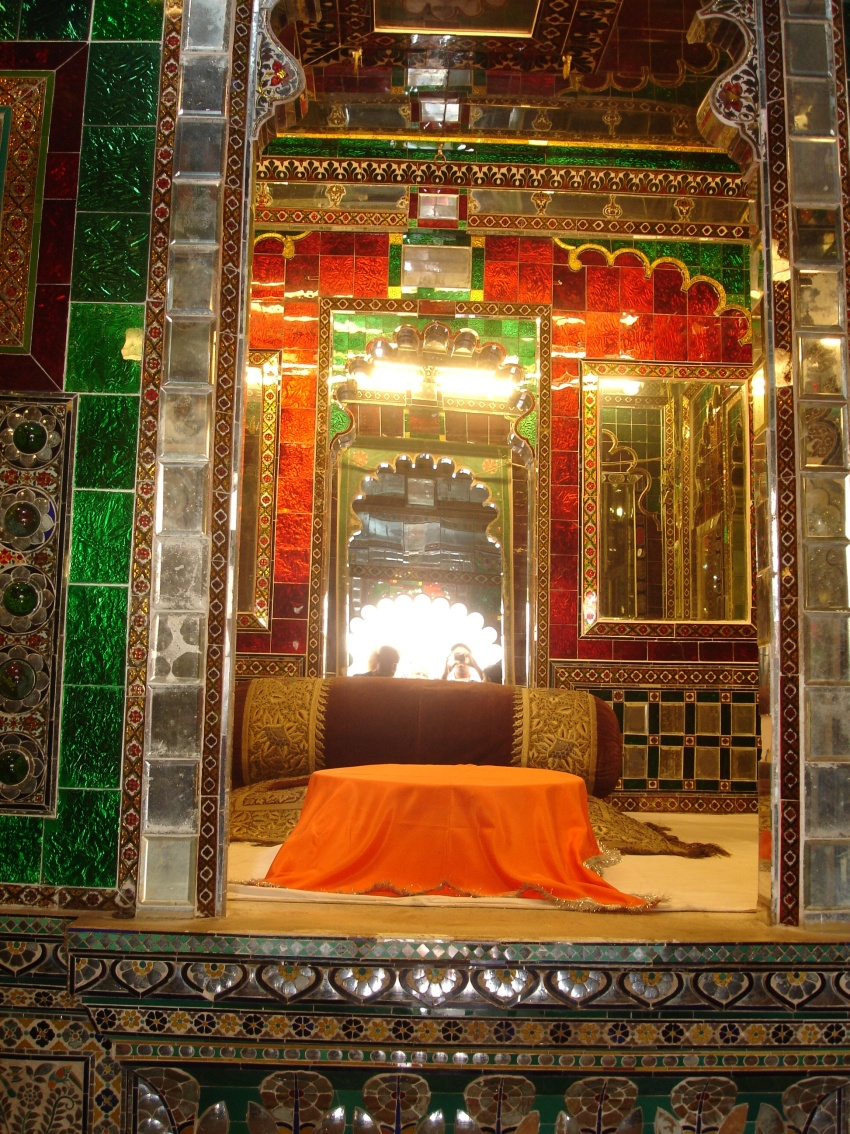
A room in the palace

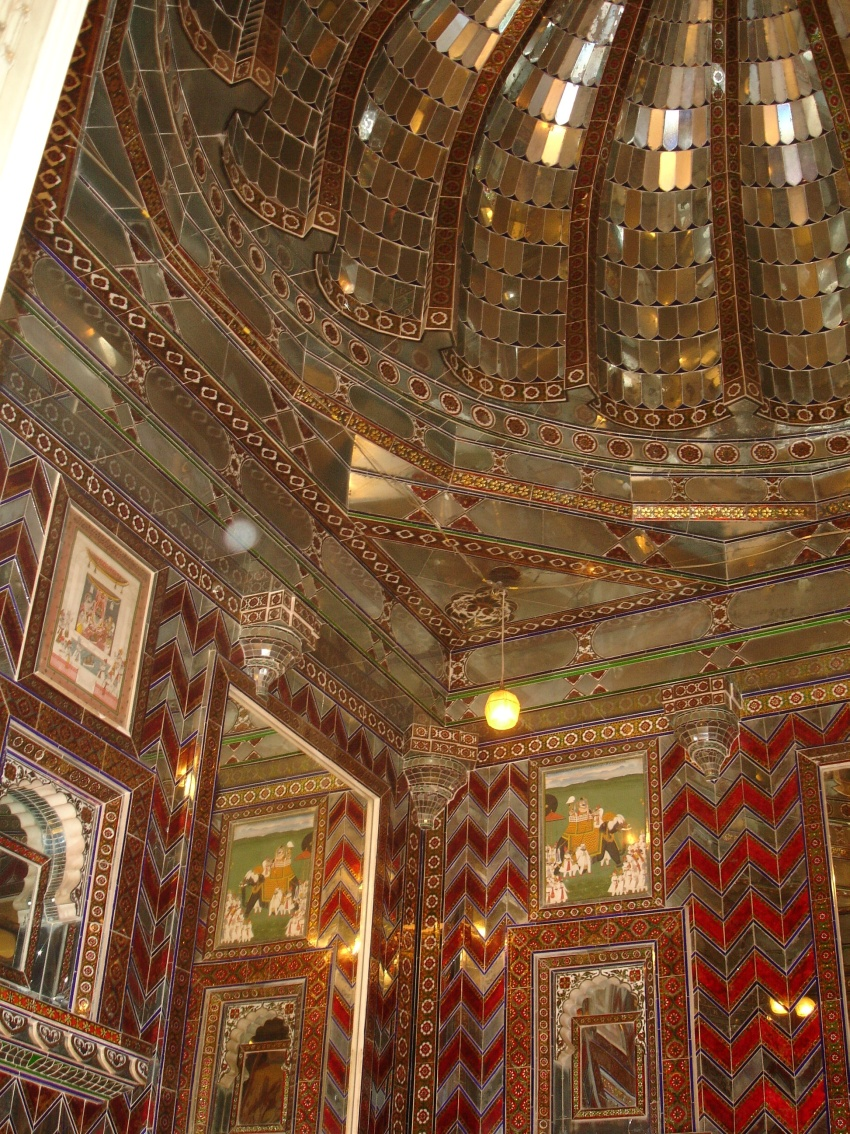
Another room in the palace

When first built the palace had nine suites, all on the ground floor. During its conversion into a hotel, eight apartments were added in a new second story so that the hotel now has 36 guest rooms consisting of:

- 19 deluxe rooms
- 8 terrace suites
- 6 royal suites
- 3 imperial suites

Since its conversion into a hotel it has played host to, among others, Queen Elizabeth II, the King of Nepal, the Shah of Iran, and Jacqueline Kennedy.

The hotel is run by the HRH Group of Hotels, itself owned by the current Maharana.

The palace was featured in the 1983 James Bond movie Octopussy.

== Literature ==
- Badhwar, Inderjit; Leong, Susan (2006). India Chic. Singapore: Bolding Books. ISBN 981-4155-57-8.
- Crites, Mitchell Shelby; Nanji, Ameeta (2007). India Sublime – Princely Palace Hotels of Rajasthan. New York: Rizzoli. ISBN 978-0-8478-2979-8.
- Crump, Vivien; Toh, Irene (1996). Rajasthan. London: Everyman Guides. ISBN 1-85715-887-3.
- Michell, George; Martinelli, Antonio (2005). The Palaces of Rajasthan. London: Frances Lincoln. ISBN 978-0-7112-2505-3.
- Warren, William; Gocher, Jill (2007). Asia's Legendary Hotels: The Romance of Travel. Singapore: Periplus Editions. ISBN 978-0-7946-0174-4.
