= Fateh Singh of Mewar =

Maharana of Udaipur from 1884–1930

Sir Fateh Singh
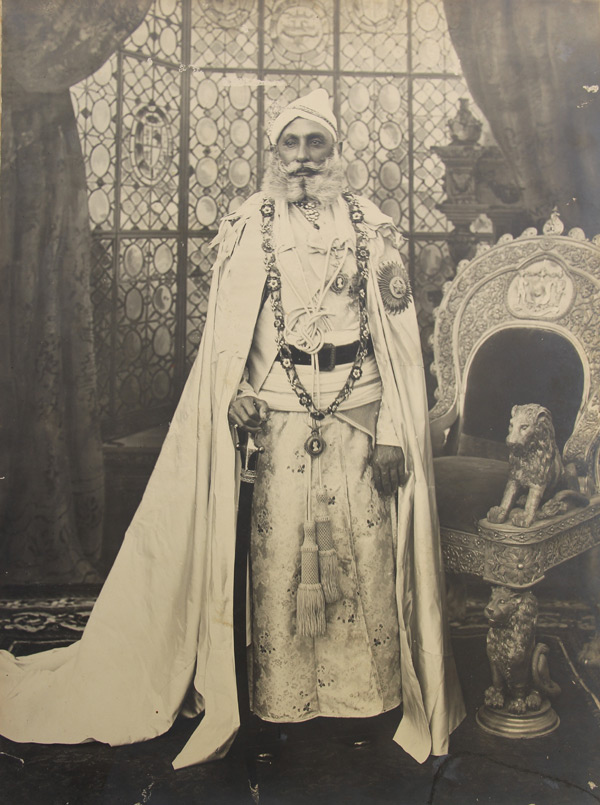

Maharana of Udaipur
- Reign: 1884– 1930
- Predecessor: Sajjan Singh
- Successor: Bhupal Singh
- Born: 16 December 1849
- Died: 24 May 1930 (aged 80); Udaipur, Udaipur State, British India (present-day Rajasthan, India)
- Spouse: HH Maharaniji Sa Rathoreji Shri Phool Kanwarji Saheba of Khod in Jodhpur State, Marwar; HH Maharaniji Sa Chawdiji Shri Bakht Kanwarji Saheba of Kaladwas in Udaipur State, Mewar
- Issue: Raghubir Singh; Bhupal Singh; Maharajkumariji Baiji Lal Omkar Kanwarji m. to HH Maharaja Sir Madan Singh of Kishangarh State; Maharajkumariji Baiji Lal Kishor Kanwarji m. to HH Maharaja Sir Sardar Singh of Jodhpur State
- House: Sisodia
- Father: Maharaj Dalel Singh of Shivrati in Udaipur State
- Mother: Ajit Kanwarji (d. of Rao Paney Singh of Aalsar in Bikaner State)

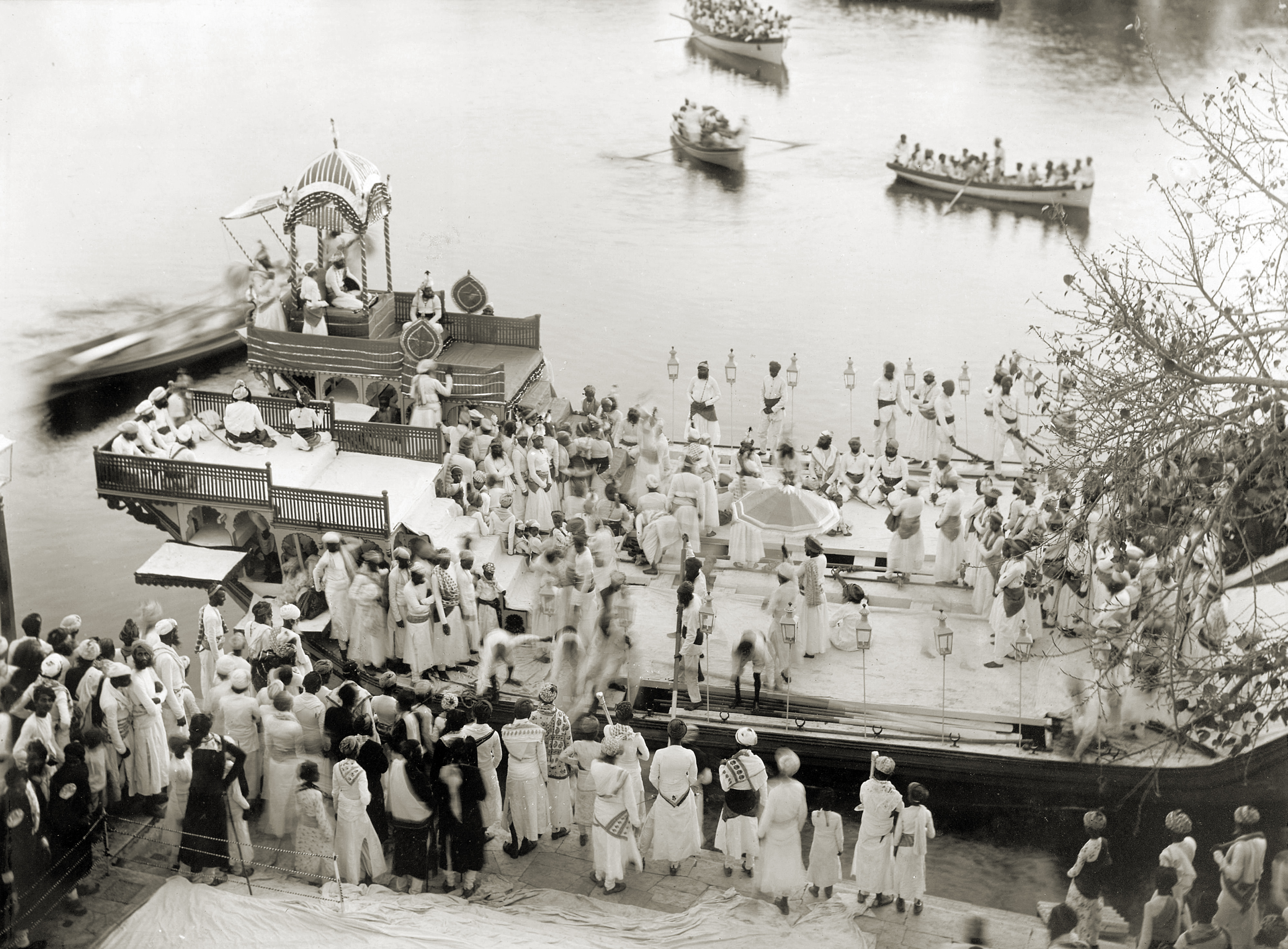
Maharaja Fateh Singh on royal barge, Lake Pichola, Udaipur, early 1900s

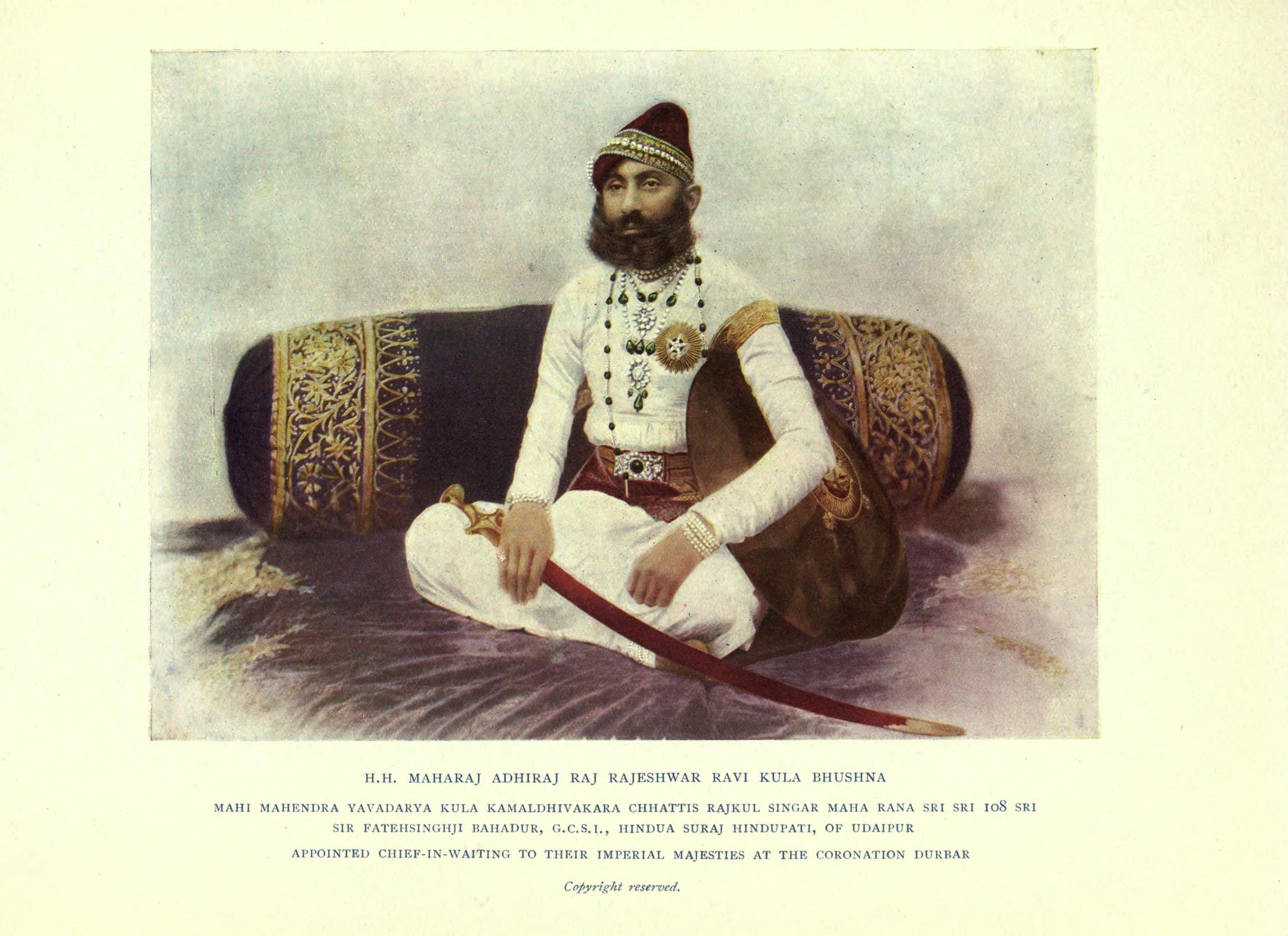
Maharaja Fateh Singh Bahadur

Maharana Sir Fateh Singh GCSI GCIE GCVO (16 December 1849 – 24 May 1930), ruled Mewar for 46 years from 1884 to 1930, with Udaipur as capital, and resided in the City Palace, Udaipur.

== Biography ==
He was born on 16 December 1849 at Shivrati, son of Maharaj Dal Singh of the Shivrati branch of Mewar dynasty – a descendant of the fourth son, Arjun Singh, of the Rana Sangram Singh II (AD 1710–1734). First he was adopted by his elder brother, Gaj Singh who had no heir, subsequently Maharana Sajjan Singh of Udaipur, who too had no heir, adopted him, he eventually became the Maharaja of Udaipur in 1884. In 1887, he received G.C.S.I.

In 1889, he built the "Connaught Dam" on Lake Dewali to mark the visit of Duke of Connaught, son of Queen Victoria, this enlarged the lake, and it was later renamed, Fateh Sagar Lake.

He also built Fateh Prakash Palace in Chittorgarh fort, which is an edifice with a tower on each of its four corners crowned by domed chhatris. This palace is a grand specimen of modern Indian architecture and at present houses a museum.

The Shiv Niwas Palace at Udaipur was also built by him. The palace was reserved exclusively by the House of Mewar for visiting dignitaries and guests during British Raj. It now has been turned into a luxury hotel.

He was the only Maharaja to not attend the Delhi Durbar, both of 1903 and 1911. Then in 1921, when Edward, Prince of Wales, son of King George V and Queen Mary, visited Udaipur, he refused to receive him, citing illness and instead sent his son. The independent attitude adopted by Fateh Singh observed in his refusal to appoint a Dewan and his direct or indirect association with people of known anti-British sentiments such as Kesari Singh Barhath and Shyamaji Krishna Verma made him a problematic figure for the British Government. This left him at odds with the British, thereafter, under the garb of ignoring a social unrest in Mewar, on 28 July 1921, his powers were curtailed and he was formally deposed, he was however allowed to retain his title, the effective power was handed to his son and heir, Bhupal Singh.

== Personal life ==
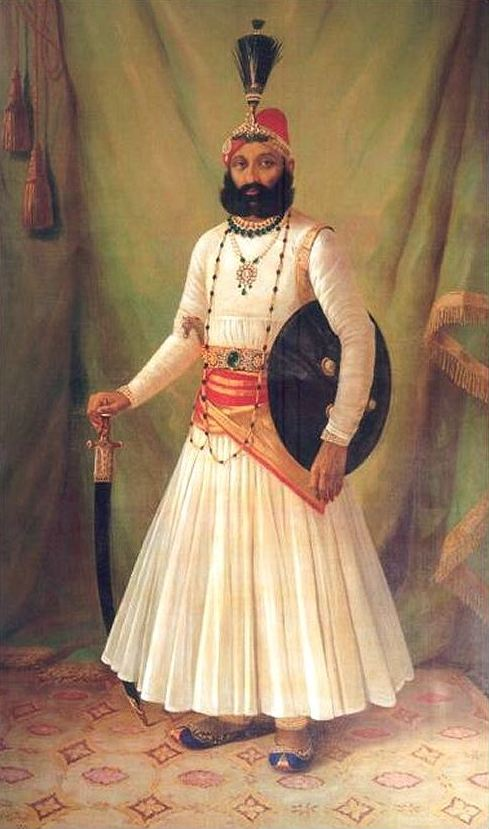
Maharaja Fateh Singh, portrait by Raja Ravi Varma

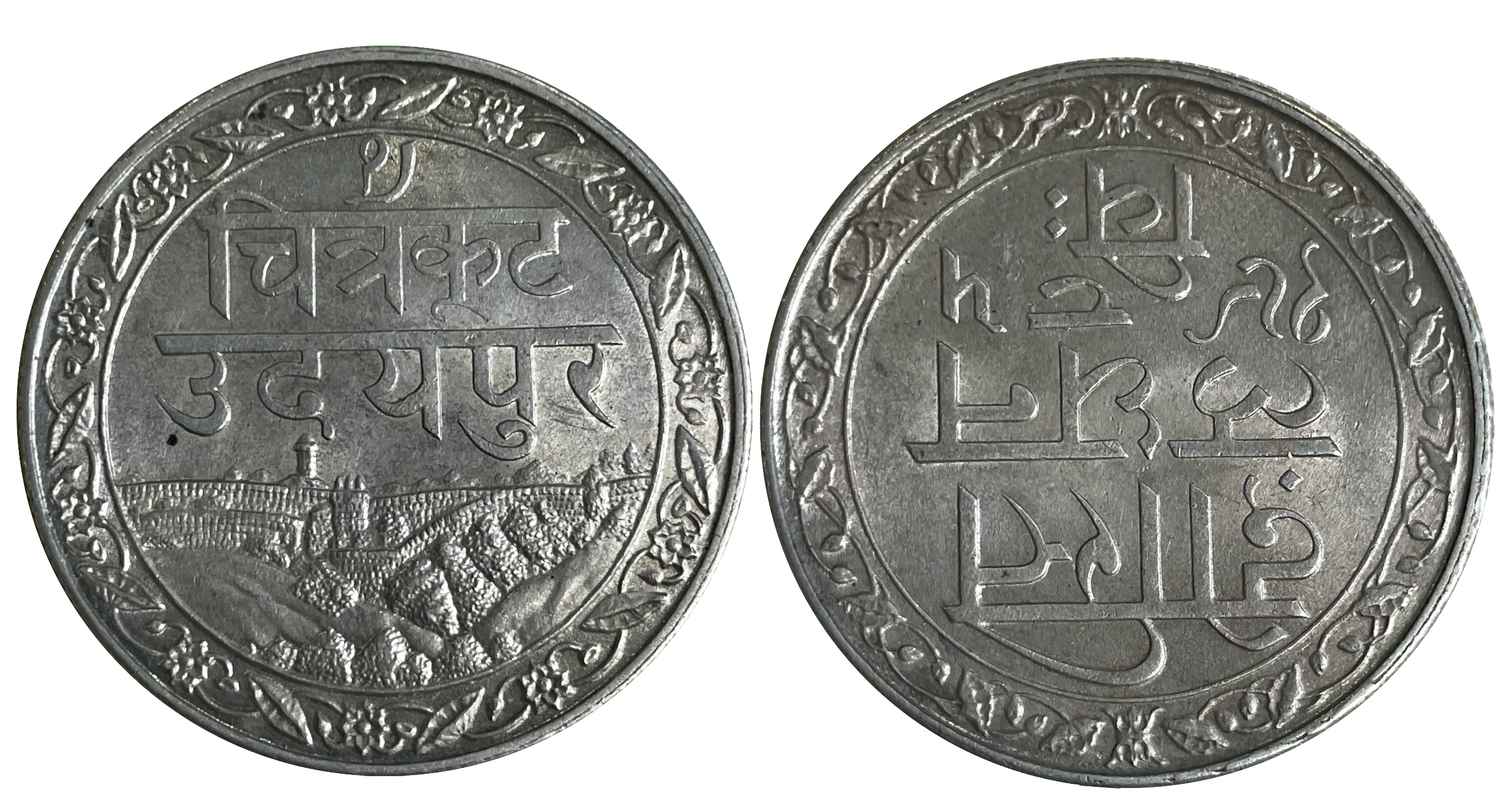
Silver coin: 1 rupee of Udaipur State, Fatteh Singh, 1928

He was first married in 1867, to Rani Phool Kumari, daughter of the Thakur of Khod in Marwar, who died in 1877. Subsequently, he was married in 1878, a daughter of Thakur Chanda Kol Singh of Varsoda, and had two sons, Raghubir Singh, Bhupal Singh, and daughters, Ankaran Bai, married in 1904 to Madan Singh of Kishangarh, and Kishor Kunwar, married 1908 to Sardar Singh of Jodhpur.

He died on May 24, 1930, at Udaipur.

== See also ==
- Chetavani ra Chungatya

Preceded by Sajjan Singh	Ruler of Mewar; 1884—1930	Succeeded by Bhupal Singh
