= Barhath Kriparam Khidiya =

Rajasthani poet and writer (1743–1833)

Barhath Kripa Ram Khidiya
- Born: 1743; Jasuri, Nagaur district
- Died: 1833 (aged 89–90)
- Occupation: Rajasthani poet
- Notable work: 'Rajiya Ra Soratha', 'Rajiya Ra Doha'

Barhath Kripa Ram Ji Khidiya (1743–1833) was a famous Rajasthani poet of the 18th century. He is known for his soratha (and duha) on ethics (नीति) called 'Rajiya Ra Soratha' and 'Rajiya Ra Doha'. In addition to his ethical writings, the poet's other works are concerned with devotion to God and heroism.

== Biography ==
Kriparam was born to Jagramdas Khidiya in 1743 in the village of Jasuri (Nagaur). His father Jagramdas was a Dingala poet-scholar originally from Kharadi (Pali). Zalim Singh Mertiya of Kuchaman honored Jagramdas and granted Jasuri in sasan where Kriparam was born. Kriparam had two brothers; namely Jaduram and Manohardas. Kriparam received his education at Jaipur. He was a scholar of Dingala, Sanskrit, and Pingala.

At the beginning, Kriparam stayed at Kuchaman from where he moved to Sikar and served in the court of Devi Singh and his successor Laxman Singh. Devi Singh of Sikar honored him and granted sasan land in Maharajpura in 1790 CE (VS 1847 Margashirsha Vadi 13). Laxman Singh of Sikar presented him the sasan of Laxmanpura and Badkasni in 1801 CE (VS 1858 Ashadha Vadi 3). He was greatly respected at Sikar court and bestowed with the title of Rājya Śrī. Laxmanpura became home to Kriparam's second son Krishnadas and the village came to be known as 'Kriparam ki Dhani'.

Kriparam married twice. From his first wife, a Patavat-Rohadia of Bithwaliya, he had 3 sons - Nagraj, Narayandas, and Krishnadas. From his second wife, he had 3 sons - Ramnath, Avaddan, and Shivdan. Once, Maharaja Man Singh of Marwar respectfully summoned Barhath Kriparam to Jodhpur to solve a specific problem in poetics. However, the poet sent his gifted son Nagaraj who he believed to be capable of resolving this matter. In a gesture of respect and of resolving the issue, Man Singh bestowed upon him a village called Medas in Nagaur district. Nagraj adopted his younger brother Shivdan to be his successor in Medas.

=== Anecdotes ===
During the reign of Maharaja Sawai Jagat Singh of Jaipur, there was unrest in Sikar which led to an attack by the Jaipur army under Khushali Ram Haldia. Raoraja Laxman Singh of Sikar prepared for battle but realized Sikar could not match Jaipur's military might. To prevent destruction of the Sikar fort, a delegation including Kriparam Khidiya and 4 other nobles met Commander Haldia near Reengas. Haldia and Kriparamji Khidiya were childhood classmates in Jaipur. When engaged in political maneuvering, Kriparamji shared two verses with the commander: Firstly, if you ever were a friend to me then this is an opportunity to uphold our friendship, and secondly, this is also an opportunity to do a favour to Sikar estate which will be remembered perpetually.

Dingala	English translation
सांचो मित सचेत, प्रीत निभावे प्रेम सूं । हरि अर्जुन रे हेत, रथ कर हांक्यो राजिया॥	A true friend is one who always being careful, upholds his friendship. Just as to help his friend Arjuna, Lord Krishna became a charioteer .

Dingala	English translation
समझण हार सुजाण, नर अवसर चूके नहीं । अवसर रो अहसाण, रहे घणा दिव राजिया ॥	Wise men of understanding do not miss the opportune occasion. A favour done promptly aiding a noble soul, leaves a lasting impression, fostering enduring gratitude.

These words had a profound impact on Haldia. It is a recorded event that Commander Haldia redirected the cannons of Jaipur army away from Sikar, thus preventing significant damage to the Sikar fort.

== Works ==
The poet's published works include Kavitta Chalairaya ra, Sat Rut Varnan, assorted writings on the Gita, as well as Rajiya ra Soratha (a collection of 140 verses, edited by Jagdishsinha Gahalote, Hindi Sahitya Mandir, Jodhpur, 1934) and Rajiya ra Duha (a collection of 165 verses, edited by Narottamdas Swami, Bikaner).

Besides these, he is also known to have authored Alankara Grantha, Chalakaneci, Chalakaraya Nataka, among others, but these are not available anymore.

=== Rajiya ra Duha (and Soratha) ===
However, the poet's enduring fame rests on his collection of verses known as Rajiya ra Soratha or Duha. The poet immortalized his personal attendant, Rajiya, in these didactic verses, written in the Soratha metre. The verses are expressed in simple language, drawing on the poet's experience of public life and the multifarious aspects of ethics. They have gained immense popularity among the masses as ethical sayings and maxims appropriate to various occasions, providing moral guidance based on experience rather than traditional ethical texts.

People commonly recall 'Rajiye ra Soratha' through oral traditions. In earlier period, a few literature enthusiasts attempted to transcribe it, estimated at about 360 verses, yet these manuscripts met destruction. To date, only 150-160 verses of this work have been brought to print. These were first published in 1894.
