= Shahpura State =

Former Indian princely state

Coordinates: 25.63°N 74.93°E

State of Shahpura शाहपुरा रियासत
- Princely State
- 1629–1949
- Flag

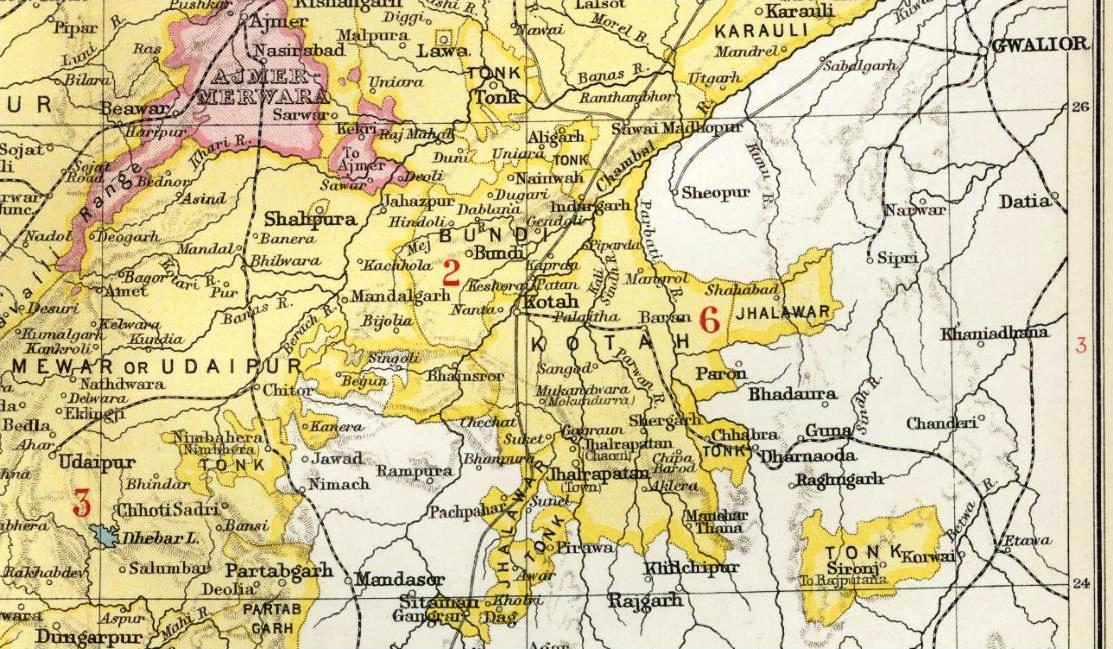
- Shahpura State in the Imperial Gazetteer of India
- Area
  - 1931: 1,048 km^{2} (405 sq mi)
- Population
  - 1931: 54,233
- History
  - Established: 1629
  - Independence of India: 1949
Succeeded by
India
- Today part of: Rajasthan, India

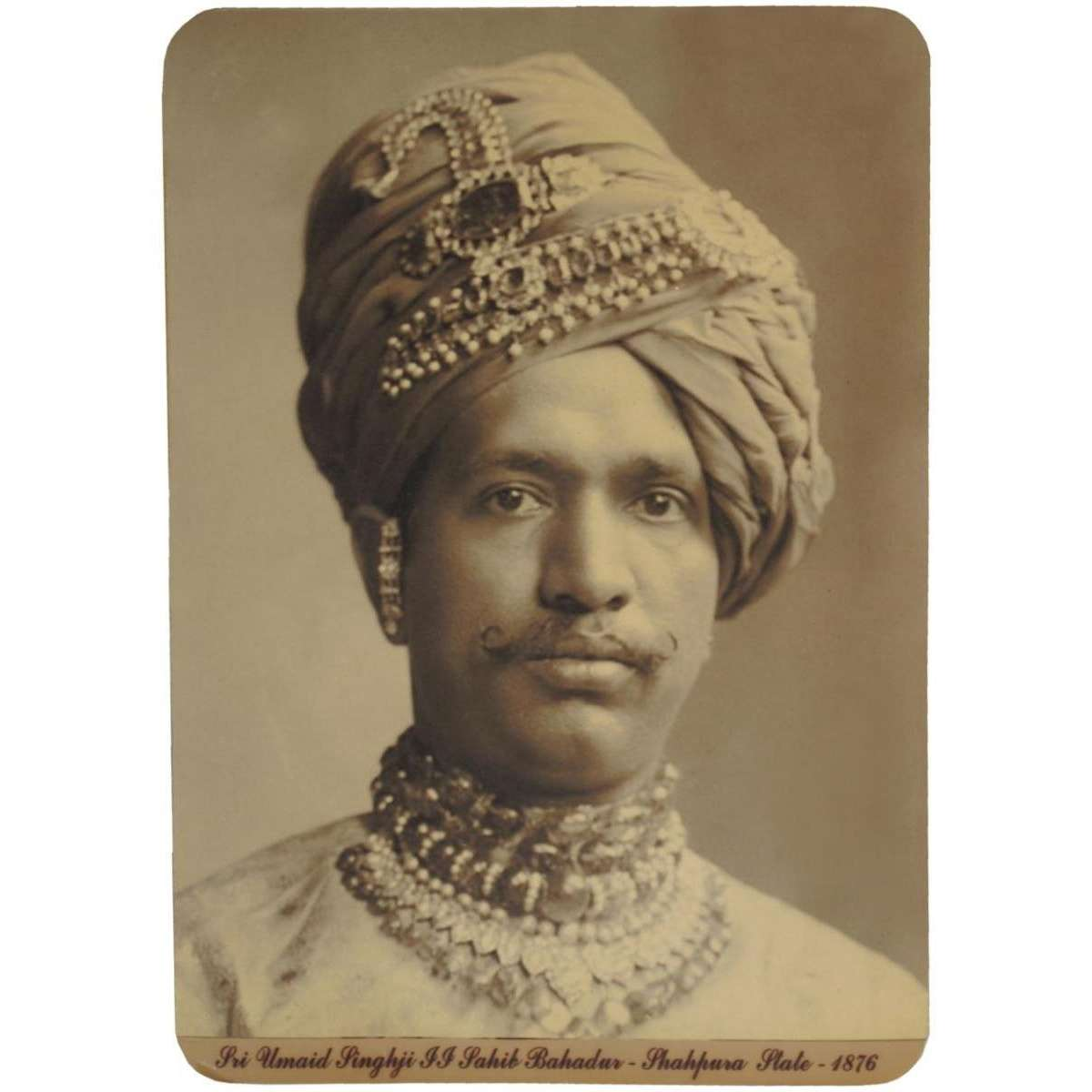
Maharaja Sri Umaid Singh II (1876–1955).

The State of Shahpura or Princely State of Shahpura was a princely state in Shahpura, Bhilwara during the era of British India. Its relations with the British were managed by the Rajputana Agency. The last ruler of Shahpura signed the accession to join the Indian Union in 1949.

Shahpura, as part of Ajmer, came to be held as a direct grant under the British – the previous ruler of Ajmer, Maharaja Daulat Rao Sindhia of Gwalior, having ceded Ajmer to the East India Company on 25 June 1818 as a result of the Third Anglo-Maratha War. The Raja Dhiraj – Shahpura's ruler – also held an estate under the Maharaja of Udaipur. Up until 1869, Shahpura was under the supervision of the Commissioner of Ajmer, after which it was transferred to the Haraoti and Tonk Agency, which had its headquarters at Deoli and also dealt with the states of Tonk and Bundito.

== History ==
In 1629 the Phulia estate jagir was given to a Sisodia prince called Sujan Singh by The Maharana of Mewar.

Its rulers bore the title of "Raja" but were later bestowed with the title of "Raja Dhiraj" by the Maharana of Mewar. In 1908 the average revenue of the state was Rs.3,00,000. The Raja Dhiraj of Shahpura was entitled to a 9 gun salute.

=== Raja Dhiraj's ===
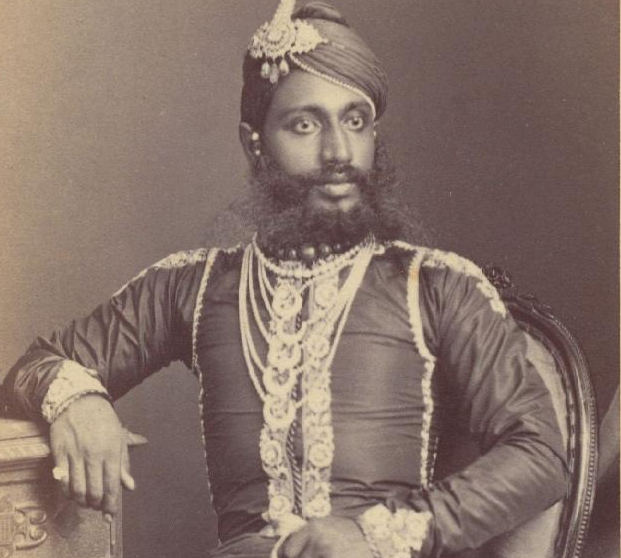
Maharaja Nahar Singh Reign - 1870-1932

- 1706 – 27 December 1729 Bharat Singh (d. 1730)
- 27 Dec 1729 – 13 January 1769 Umaid Singh I (d. 1769)
- 14 Jan 1769 – 29 May 1774 Ram Singh (d. 1774)
- 29 May 1774 – 19 May 1796 Bhim Singh (b. c.1715 – d. 1796)
- 19 May 1796 – 7 July 1827 Amar Singh (b. 1784 – d. 1827)
- 19 May 1796 – c. 1802 .... -Regent
- 7 July 1827 – 5 June 1845 Madho Singh (b. 1813 – d. 1845)
- 5 June 1845 – 23 June 1853 Jagat Singh (b. 1837 – d. 1853)
- 5 June 1845 – 18.. Rani Khangarotji (f) -Regent
- 15 Jul 1853 – 21 April 1869 Lakshman Singh (b. 1852 – d. 1870)
- 23 Jun 1853 – 21 April 1870 Rani Mertaniji (f) -Regent (b. c.1832 – d. 1916)
- 21 Apr 1870 – 24 June 1932 Sir Nahar Singh (b. 1855 – d. 1932) (from 1 January 1903, Sir Nahar Singh)
- 21 Apr 1870 – 3 March 1876 Rani Mertaniji (f) -Regent (s.a.)
- 24 Jun 1932 – 3 February 1947 Umaid Singh II (b. 1876 – d. 1955)
- 3 Feb 1947 – 15 August 1947 Sudharshandev Singh (b. 1915 – d. 1992)

== See also ==
- Rajputana Agency
