= Nobles of Udaipur =

List of nobles of Udaipur

The Nobles of Udaipur, commonly known as the Umraos, were the chiefs and feudatories of the Kingdom of Mewar.

== Background ==
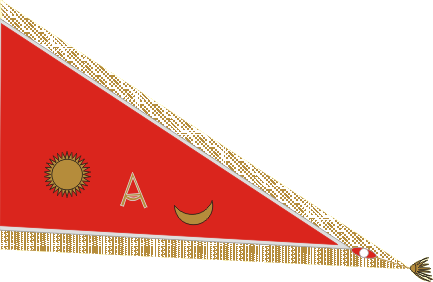
Flag of Kingdom of Mewar

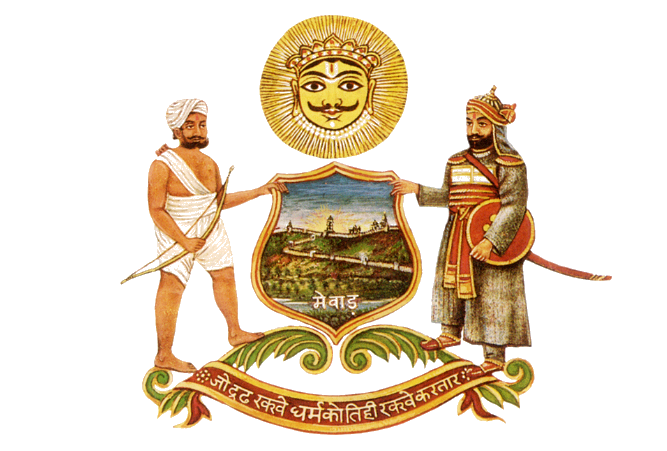
Coat of arms of Kingdom of Mewar

Udaipur was the premier princely state in the province of Rajputana and covered an area of 12,941 square miles. Of this, nearly one-third, that is about 4,313.67 square miles, consisted of estates, which were held by nobles of the state. These nobles enjoyed rights and privileges that were held by no other nobles in Rajputana. For example, their individual durbars mirrored that of the Maharana, they showed few signs of vassalage at the durbars of the other rulers, and, in the durbar of the Maharana, chief nobles ranked above the Yuvaraja, or the heir apparent. The reason for the last two rights and privileges is that, when Amar Singh I made peace with Jahangir, he insisted that he and his successors would never be required to attend the imperial durbar in person, and that their only act of submission was to receive the imperial firman, or decree, whenever a new ruler came to the throne, and that too outside the walls of his capital. As such, the heirs of the state attended the imperial durbar, but they never did so as rulers. At his court, Jahangir had placed Amar's heir Karan Singh II at his right hand, above all the other rulers of India. To make up for the heir attending the durbar of the Mughal Emperor, the chief nobles of the state were granted, by the Maharana, rank above his heir. For these reasons, nobles of the state regarded themselves, and were generally treated, as superior in rank to nobles at other durbars; in fact, they were even allowed to sit almost as equals with the rulers of other states. For example, when Bajirao I visited Jaipur, Sawai Jai Singh II shared his gadi, or throne, with him. Bajirao then made room for the then Rawat of Salumbar, one of the leading nobles of Mewar, who was accompanying him, on the same gadi. On the other hand, when Bajirao was visiting Udaipur, instead of arguing with the Maharana over where he should sit, he claimed the special privilege of being a Brahmin, which allowed him to spread his cloth in front of the throne. The seating arrangement of the nobles in the durbar was determined by the rank of their house: those seated to the right of the Maharana were called badi ole, while those seated to the Maharana's left were known as munda-barobur. In order to ensure that the nobles who were seated on the left did not feel inferior, they used to sit parallel to the throne, thus munda-barobur, that is, head at the level of the face of the Maharana. Rajvis, or the relatives of the Maharana, used to sit at a lower level, i.e. in front of the throne.

== Types ==
Nobles of Mewar were categorised into three categories, namely: Solah-ke-Umrao, Battis-ke-Umrao, and Gol-ke-Sardar. During the reign of Amar Singh II, the nobles were arranged into these categories. According to an estimate, it is believed that nobles belonging to the first category had annual incomes of around Rs 100,000, those in the second category had around Rs 50,000, and those in the third category had around Rs 20,000.

Most of these nobles belonged to the following dynasties: Sisodia, Jhala, Parmar, Chauhan, Dodiya, Rathore, and Solanki.

=== Solah-ke-Umrao ===
Solah-ke-Umrao were called so because their number was originally sixteen, and in the course of time it increased. But the number of seats in the durbar remained the same, that is, sixteen, and the nobles who were later added to this class could take a seat in the durbar only when some old nobles of this rank were absent. They formed the advisory council of the state, and it is from their rank that commanders of the army, ministers of the state and ambassadors to the other durbar were selected. Some of these nobles were close kin of the Maharana himself. They were nobles of the first class. Heir of the Maharana and his nearest relatives used to sit below these nobles.

Solah-ke-Umrao were:

#		Name	Dynasty	Clan	Subclan	Note (s)	Source
1		Bari Sadri	Jhala			Ajja, following the failure of his efforts to depose Ranoji from the throne of Halvad, which he had usurped, came to Mewar with his brother Sajja. There, the two were cordially received by Sanga and entered his service. Ajja, in due course of time, fought on the side of Sanga in the battle of Khanwa against Babur. In the battle, when Sanga fell unconscious, Ajja was called to take Sanga's place on his elephant, and fight. Ajja obliged, gallantly fought and died on the battlefield. In lieu of his meritorious services to Mewar, this estate was conferred on his son, Siha. Many of the successive chieftains of this estate died in the service of Mewar, including Man Singh (Mana or Bida). Man, in the battle of Haldighati, to save the life of Pratap Singh I, took his place in the battle, donned his royal insignia, fought, and died. In memory of this incident, the Raj Rana is permitted to bear the royal insignia of the House of Mewar.	
2		Bedla	Chauhan	Purabia		Rao of Bedla and Rawat of Kotharia claim descent from Prithviraj Chauhan. The ancestors of the two had taken refuge at Chitor after the conquest of Delhi by Muhammad Ghori. Ramchandra of Bedla had, on numerous occasions, attended Jagat Singh and Raj Singh at the durbars of Jahangir and Shahjahan, and received khillats, elephants, horses, jewels and other gifts from both Emperors. A daughter of his, by the name of Dev Kanwar, married Amar Singh II and was the mother of Sangram Singh II.	
3		Kotharia	Chauhan	Purabia		Rao of Bedla and Rawat of Kotharia claim descent from Prithviraj Chauhan. The ancestors of the two had taken refuge at Chitor after the conquest of Delhi by Muhammad Ghori. Ramchandra of Bedla had, on numerous occasions, attended Jagat Singh and Raj Singh at the durbars of Jahangir and Shahjahan, and received khillats, elephants, horses, jewels and other gifts from both Emperors. A daughter of his, by the name of Dev Kanwar, married Amar Singh II and was the mother of Sangram Singh II.	
4		Ghanerao	Rathore	Mertia		This jagir was originally granted to a descendant of Dudaji, who had been expelled from his jagir of Merta because of his conflict with the ruler of Marwar. When, in later days, Ari Singh II of Mewar transferred Godwar to Vijay Singh of Marwar in lieu of military help against his refractory nobles, this jagir was also transferred to Marwar. There, the proprietor of Ghanerao received all the honours due to him in Mewar. His seat is still kept unoccupied in the durbar of Mewar. Given the fact that several of the ancestors of the Thakur of Ghanerao had shed their blood in defence of Kumbalgarh, he, when attending the durbar of the Maharana, was received with a war cry, i.e., Remember Kumbalgarh, and was presented with a khillat.	
5		Salumbar	Sisodia	Chundawat	Kandhalwat	Chunda, the ancestor of the Rawats of Salumbar and elder son of Lakha, had, after becoming annoyed by his father, renounced his right to the throne of Mewar in favour of his younger brother Mokal. In lieu of this, however, Chunda retained for himself and his descendants the following rights: first place in the councils of the state, and that his symbol, the bhala, would always be attached to the signature of the Maharana in all grants. Thus, the Rawat also claims the office of hereditary councillor, and had attempted to have this claim recognised by the East India Company in their treaty of 1818 with the Maharana, but failed. At the installation of the new Maharana, the Rawat draws blood from his own thumb, does his tilak, girds the sword around his waist, touches the ground thrice, and hails him as the Maharana.	
6		Bijolian	Panwar			The proprietor of the estate held the title of Rao Sawai and claimed descent from the Raos of Jagner. The progenitor of the family, Ashoka, came to Mewar during the reign of Sanga and was granted this estate.	
7	A	Deogarh	Sisodia	Chundawat	Sangawat	Sanga, a son of Siha, the Rawat of Amet, was granted this estate.	
7	B	Begun	Sisodia	Chundawat	Meghawat	The original recipient of this estate was Govind Das, a son of Khengarji, the Rawat of Salumber.	
8		Delwara	Jhala			The family of Raj Rana of Delwara is descended from Sajja who came from Halvad to Mewar with his brother Ajja. Sajja was granted this estate by the Maharana and was killed during the siege of Chittorgarh by Bahadur Shah.	
9	A	Amet	Sisodia	Chundawat	Jaggawat	When Vikramaditya was killed by Banvir, Chunda's great-grandson Jagga took Vikramaditya's son Udai Singh II to safety and seated him on the throne. Jagga's son Patta bravely fought against Akbar during the siege of Chittorgarh and was killed. Patta's son Karn Singh was granted this estate in recognition of Patta's gallantry.	
9	B	Meja	Sisodia	Chundawat		When Prithvi Singh II, the Rawat of Amet, died without any male issue, the succession to his rank, title, and dignity was contested by Chattar Singh of Jeelola and Amar Singh of Bemali. Since Chattar was the original adopted son and nearest kin of the deceased Rawat, Swarup Singh nominated him as his successor. However, Shambhu Singh permitted Amar Singh to occupy the seat of the Rawat of Amet in the durbar. Swarup later conferred on Amar the title of Rawat and granted him the estate of Meja.	
10		Gogunda	Jhala			Kanah Singh, a son of Shatrusal Singh, who in turn was a son of Man Singh II, the Raj of Delwara, was granted this estate after his father was killed fighting against the Mughals near Gogunda.	
11		Kanore	Sisodia	Sarangdevot		The founder of the family was Ajja, the second son of Lakha.	
12		Bhindar	Sisodia	Shaktawat		The family of the proprietor of Bhindar claims descent from Shakti Singh.	
13		Badnore	Rathore	Mertia		The Thakurs of Badnore are descended from Rao Duda, a younger son of Rao Jodha of Jodhpur, who was the founder of Merta and the Mertia family. Jaimal of this family emigrated to Mewar in the time of Udai Singh and fought on the side of Mewar against the Mughal troops and was killed during the siege of Chittorgarh.	
14	A	Bansi	Sisodia	Shaktawat	Achalawat	The family of the Rawat of Bansi claims descent from Achal Das, a son of Shakti Singh.	
14	B	Bhainsrorgarh	Sisodia	Chundawat	Krishnawat	The family of the Rawat of Bhainsrorgarh is descended from Lal Singh, second son of Kesri Singh, the Rawat of Salumber. Lal Singh was granted this estate by Ari Singh II, along with the title of Rawat and a seat among solah-ke-umraos, for killing Ari's uncle Nath Singh of Bagore, with whom Lal had exchanged his turban and pledged friendship.	
15	A	Parsoli	Chauhan			This estate was granted in 1656 to Kesri Singh, a younger son of Ramchandra of Bedla, by Raj Singh, in recognition of his great valour shown in many battles.	
15	B	Kurabad	Sisodia	Chundawat	Krishnawat	The founder of the family was Arjun Singh, a son of Kesri Singh, the Rawat of Salumber.	
16		Asind	Sisodia	Chundawat	Krishnawat	The founder of his family was Ajit Singh, a son of Arjun Singh, the Rawat of Kurabad. Ajit received a grant of a gorkhya estate comprising fourteen villages from Bhim Singh, when he had, on his behalf, signed the treaty of 1818 with the East India Company. As Ajit had no male issue, he had adopted Dule Singh from Satola, who, previous to his adoption, had received the title of Rawat and several villages, including Asind. Dule Singh was later raised to the position of a first-class sardar with a place among the solah.	
17		Sardargarh	Dodiya			In 1383, when Rana Lakha's mother was on a pilgrimage in Gujarat, she was attacked by a gang of robbers, and Rao Siha came to her aid. Siha was killed in the skirmish. In recognition of this, Lakha bestowed Nand Ras, Badnore, and Masuda on Dhawal Singh, son of Siha, and created him a noble of the first class. A descendant of Dhawal, Sardar Singh, founded the Sardargarh.	
A & B = Aik Baithak, i.e. the two held an equivalent rank, seat or status. Either one was invited to the durbar on an alternating or rotational basis according to an established roster.

=== Battis-ke-Umrao ===
Battis-ke-Umrao were so called because their number was originally thirty-two, which in the course of time increased. They were nobles of the second class. The nobles of this rank were required to maintain their attendance in Udaipur on a regular basis, and it was from their rank that faujdars, who were responsible for border security, were appointed; for this purpose, they had small bands of sepoys under them.

#	Name	Dynasty	Clan	Subclan	Note (s)	Source
1	Hamirgarh	Sisodia	Chundawat	Veeramdevot		
2	Chavand	Sisodia	Chundawat			
3	Bhadesar	Sisodia	Chundawat			
4	Bohida	Sisodia	Shaktawat			
5	Bhunas	Sisodia	Baba Ranawat			
6	Pipalyā	Sisodia	Shaktawat			
7	Bemali	Sisodia	Chundawat			
8	Thana	Sisodia	Chundawat	Krishnawat		
9	Rampura	Rathore	Mertia			
10	Kherabad	Sisodia	Baba Ranawat			
11	Mahua	Sisodia	Baba Ranawat			
12	Loonda	Sisodia	Chundawat			
13	Tana	Jhala			In 1717, this estate was granted by Sangram Singh II to his father-in-law Daulat Singh, a son of Chandrasen, the Raj Rana of Bari Sadri.	
14	Jarkhana	Sisodia	Ranawat			
15	Kelwa	Rathore	Jaitmalot			
16	Bari Rupaheli	Rathore	Mertia			
17	Bhagwanpura	Sisodia	Chundawat			
18	Netawal	Sisodia	Ranawat		The proprietor of this estate was descended from Surat Singh, the second son of Nath Singh of Bagore.	
19	Peeladharm	Sisodia				
20	Nimbahera	Rathore	Mertia			
21	Batherda	Sisodia	Sarangdevot			
22	Bambori	Parmar				
23	Sanwar	Sisodia	Ranawat	The family claims descent from Udai Singh II.		
24	Kareda	Sisodia	Chundawat			
25	Amargarh	Sisodia	Kanawat			
26	Lasani	Sisodia	Chundawat	Jagawat	The Thakur of Lasani belongs to the same stock of the family as the Rawat of Amet. The estate of Lasani comprised twelve villages and nine hamlets.	
27	Dhariawad	Sisodia	Ranawat			
28	Falichra	Chauhan				
29	Sangramgarh	Sisodia	Chundawat			
30	Vijaipur	Sisodia	Shaktawat			
31	Banol	Rathore	Jaitmalot			
32	Bopalnagar	Chauhan				
33	Binota	Sisodia	Shaktawat			
34	Kheroda	Rathore	Mertia	Prithvirajot		
35	Karoi	Sisodia	Ranawat			
36	Sanjela	Sisodia	Chundawat			

=== Gol-ke-Sardar ===
Gol-ke-Sardar were nobles of the third class, and they numbered in the hundreds. These were the nobles to whom no special precedence was assigned. During the durbar, nobles belonging to this category were not allotted seats and thus were required to stand throughout the proceedings. These nobles had to remain on constant duty in the service of the Maharana and formed his strength against any combination or opposition of the nobles of the higher ranks.

#	Name	Dynasty	Clan	Note (s)	#	Name	Dynasty	Clan	Note (s)	Source
1	Bambora	Sisodia	Chundawat	The founder of the family was Samant Singh, a son of Kandhalji II, the Rawat of Salumber.	27	Hinta	Sisodia	Shaktawat		
2	Roopnagar	Solanki		The ancestor of the family was Tribhuvanapala, the last of the Chaulukya dynasty, which ruled Gujarat.	28	Semari	Sisodia	Shaktawat		
3	Barliawas	Sisodia	Ranawat		29	Taloli	Sisodia	Chundawat		
4	Keryabas	Sisodia	Purawat		30	Rood	Sisodia	Shaktawat		
5	Amlda	Sisodia	Kanawat		31	Sihar	Sisodia	Shaktawat		
6	Mangrop	Sisodia	Purawat		32	Pansal	Sisodia	Shaktawat		
7	Moie / Muit	Bhati			33	Bhadu	Sisodia	Chundawat		
8	Gurlan	Sisodia	Purawat		34	Kunthawas	Sisodia	Shaktawat		
9	Dabla	Rathore	Mertia		35	Peethawas	Sisodia	Chundawat		
10	Jharol	Jhala			36	Jagpura	Rathore	Mertia		
11	Jamoli	Sisodia	Ranawat		37	Athoon	Sisodia	Purawat		
12	Gadarmala				38	Aarjya	Chavda			
13	Muroli	Bhati			39	Bhanpura	Sisodia	Dulhawat		
14	Daulatgarh	Sisodia	Chundawat		40	Bokhada	Sisodia	Dulhawat		
15	Satola	Sisodia	Chundawat		41	Jaiwana	Sisodia	Ranawat	Pahad Singh, a descendant of Udai Singh II, was granted this fief in 1817 by Bhim Singh.	
16	Bassi	Sisodia	Chundawat		42	Jhadol	Jhala			
17	Jilola				43	Kankarwa	Sisodia	Ranawat	The family claims descent from Udai Singh II.	
18	Gurla	Chauhan			44	Pahuna	Sisodia	Ranawat	The family claims descent from Udai Singh II.	
19	Taal	Sisodia	Chundawat		45	Pansal	Sisodia	Shaktawat		
20	Parsad	Sisodia	Ranawat		46	Samal	Sisodia	Dulhawat		
21	Singoli	Sisodia	Purawat		47	Khodiyo ka Khera	Sisodia	Shaktawat		
22	Bansra	Sisodia	Ranawat		48	Singhada	Sisodia	Dulhawat		
23	Kantora	Rathore			49	Junda	Chauhan			
24	Marchya Keri	Solanki			50	Gopalpura / Koon	Sisodia	Shaktawat		
25	Gyangarh	Sisodia	Chundawat		51	Mandakala	Sisodia	Shaktawat		
26	Neemri	Rathore	Mahecha		52	Kaladwas	Chavda			

== Bhumia ==
The estates held by the Bhumias of Mewar were on Khalsa land and were not hereditary unless confirmed by the Maharana. They were regarded as the undisputed lords of the soil. The Bhumia and his heirs held the land permanently in return for certain specific services, such as guarding the area, protecting roads, or attending to the Maharana for specified purposes.

#	Name	Dynasty	Clan	#	Name	Dynasty	Clan	Source
1	Jawaas	Chauhan		7	Omeriya	Solanki		
2	Jooda	Chauhan		8	Chaani	Chauhan		
3	Pahada	Chauhan		9	Thana	Chauhan		
4	Panerwa	Solanki		10	Nainwada			
5	Oghna	Solanki		11	Sarwan			
6	Madri	Sisodia	Sarangdevot	12	Paatiya	Parmar		

== Relatives ==
There was a group of nobles who were closely related to the Maharana. These were:

	Name	Dynasty	Note (s)	Source
1	Bagore	Sisodia	Sangram Singh II had four sons. Of these, the first-born, Jagat Singh II, succeeded him on the throne, and the other three, Nath Singh, Bagh Singh, and Arjun Singh, were granted the estates of Bagore, Karjali, and Shivrati respectively. Whenever the line of succession was interrupted owing to the non-availability of a direct heir, the adoption was made from these houses. Upon the death of Shakti Singh in 1889, his fief of Bagore and Bagore-ki-Haveli was confiscated by the state. All the later Maharanas, including Sardar Singh, Swarup Singh, Shambu Singh, Sajjan Singh, Fateh Singh, and Bhagwat Singh, were adopted from these houses.	
2	Karjali	Sisodia		
3	Shivrati	Sisodia		
4	Karoi	Sisodia	Descendants of Jai Singh.	
5	Bavlas	Sisodia	Descendants of Jai Singh.	
6	Banera	Sisodia	This estate was founded by Bhim Singh, a son of Raj Singh I. He had renounced his right to the throne of his father in favour of his younger brother Jai Singh. Originally, this estate was independent of Mewar, but during the reign of Raj Singh II it accepted the sovereignty of the Maharana. Its Rajadhiraj enjoyed one unique privilege that was not possessed by other nobles of Mewar, that is, a sword was sent to him with honour upon succession rather than requiring his attendance in Udaipur for investiture. After receipt of the sword, he proceeds to Udaipur for installation.	
7	Shahpura	Sisodia	Its Rajadhiraj was an independent ruler, who enjoyed a permanent salute of nine guns, and is descended from Sujan Singh, son of Maharaj Suraj Mal, who in turn was the son of Amar Singh I. By holding the jagir of Kachhola from Mewar, the Rajadhiraj was also a vassal of the Maharana.	

== Others ==
=== Pipli ===
There was also Abdul Rahim Beg, a muslim from Sindh, who was added to the solah-ke-umraos by Ari Singh II for the services he rendered to him against Ratan Singh. Ari granted Beg the estate of Pipli and an annual cash payment of 25,000 for completing the task of recruiting an army of Arabs, Scindias, Rohillas and others. He also granted him rank and seat equivalent to that of the Raj Rana of Bari Sadri. He was also permitted to carry the chaur and morchal but not in the presence of the Maharana. Other privileges granted to him included the right to beat his nagaras, using only one stick, as far as the gate of the City Palace, and to beat his drums as far as Ahar. He was also to receive a dress of honour on dussehra. In addition, he was to be provided with an umr bulaona, that is, a horse; whenever the horse died, another was to be supplied to him, and this provision was to continue thereafter. He was granted all the privileges enjoyed by the Rawat of Salumber. Three of his collaborators were likewise granted the privilege of having a seat in front of the throne, receiving an umr bulaona, and being presented with dresses of honour on dussehra. His estate was worth 200,000 rupees and was granted in perpetuity. Besides, he was given land worth 10,000 rupees outside the Debari, and 100 bighas of land outside Udaipur for the garden.

=== Dhariawad ===
Suraj Mal, the grandson of Mokal, originally held the fiefs of Sadri and Dhariawad from Mewar. In lieu of Dhariawad, his descendants, i.e., the Maharawat of Pratapgarh, were vassals of the Maharana. However, Sawant Singh, in his reign, returned it to Mewar, as he did not want to be a vassal of that state any more.
