= Jawan Singh =

Maharana of Udaipur from 1828–1838

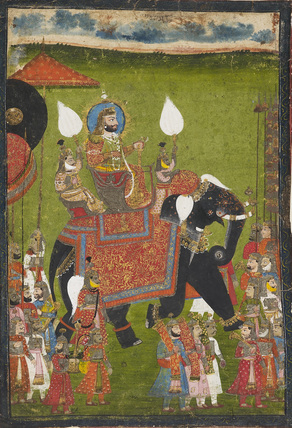
- Maharana Jawan Singh on an elephant

Maharana of Udaipur
- Reign: 1828–38
- Predecessor: Bhim Singh
- Successor: Sardar Singh
- Born: 2 July 1800
- Died: 30 August 1838 (aged 38)
- Spouse: Bhatiyaniji Suraj Kanwarji of Mohi in Mewar Bagheliji Subhadra Kanwarji of Rewa in Baghelkhand Bagheliji Sahodara Kanwarji of Rewa in Baghelkhand Bagheliji Achhraj Kanwarji of Rewa in Baghelkhand Hadiji Ratan Kanwarji of Indragarh in Kota Devadji Umaid Kanwarji of Sirohi
- Issue: No issue
- House: Ranawat Sisodia
- Father: Bhim Singh
- Mother: Chawdiji Gulab Kanwarji d.of Raol Jagatsinhji of Varsoda in Gujarat

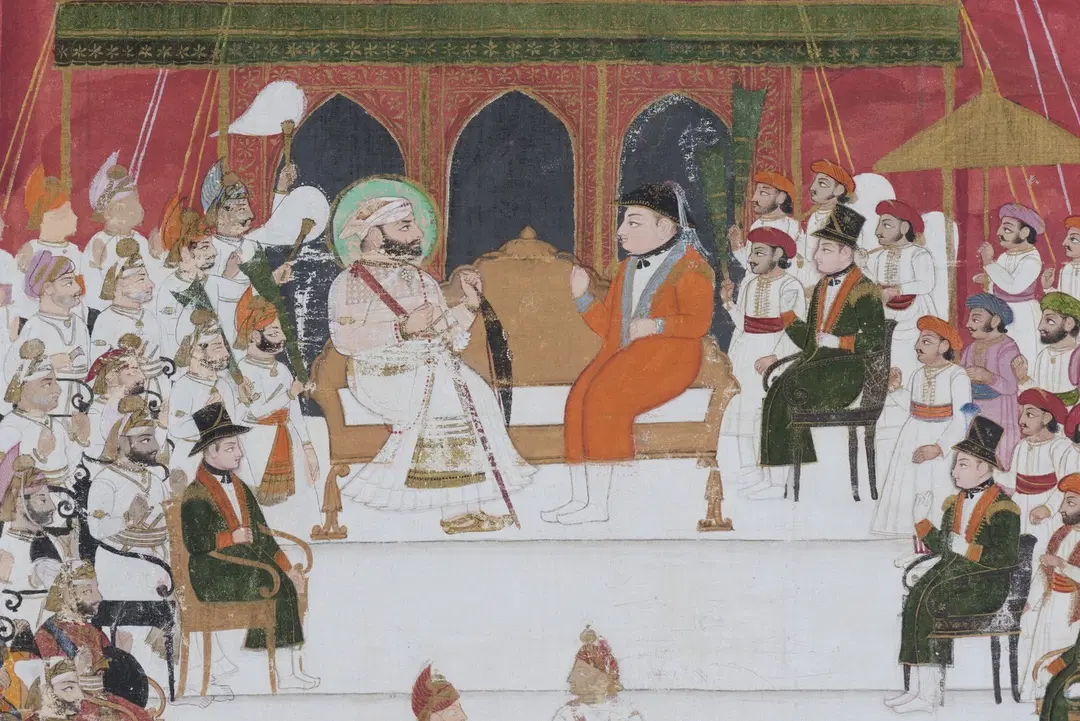
Maharana Jawan Singh of Mewar Receiving the Governor General of India, Lord William Cavendish Bentinck, February 8th, 1832

Maharana Jawan Singh (2 July 1800 – 30 August 1838) was the Sisodia Rajput ruler (r. 1828–1838) of Princely State of Udaipur. He was the only son of Maharana Bhim Singh to have survived his father. He was also a poet under the pen name of "Brijraj". He adopted his third cousin Kunwar Sardar Singh to succeed him as the next Maharana who was the great grandson of Sangram Singh II through his second son Kunwar Nath Singh of Bagore.
