= Bagor =

Bagor may refer to:

- Bagor, alternative form of the Russian male first name Abagor
- Bagor District (kecamatan), a district of Nganjuk Regency of East Java, Indonesia
- Bagor Barangay, a barangay of Kadingilan in Bukidnon Province, Philippines
- Bagor, Rajasthan, a village in India
- Bagor Station, a railway station in Indonesia
