= Bhim Singh of Marwar =

Maharaja of Marwar from 1793 to 1803

Maharaja Bhim Singh
- Maharaja of Marwar
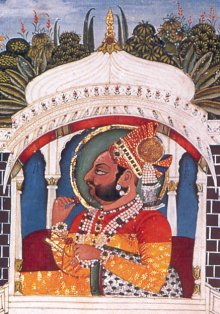

Ruler of Marwar
- Tenure: 17 July 1793 – 19 October 1803
- Coronation: 20 July 1793, Mehrangarh, Jodhpur
- Predecessor: Vijay Singh
- Successor: Man Singh
- Born: ? Jodhpur Marwar Kingdom
- Died: 19 October 1803; Mehrangarh, Jodhpur, Marwar Kingdom
- Spouse: Bhatiyaniji Shringar Kanwarji d.of Yuvraj Rai Singh and granddaughter of Maharawal Mulraj II of Jaisalmer Tanwarji Sireh Kanwarji of Kelwa in Marwar Bhatiyaniji (Rawalotji) Pratap Kanwarji of Osiyan in Marwar Bhatiyaniji (Derawarji) Gyan Kanwarji of Jakhan in Marwar Tanwarji Sardar Kanwarji of Lakhasar in Bikaner Tanwarji Suraj Kanwarji of Kelwa in Marwar Kachwahiji Anand Kanwarji of Jaipur Devadiji Sireh Kanwarji of Mandar in Sirohi Solankiniji Ratan Kanwarji of Lunawada in Gujarat Sodhiji Man Kanwarji of Umerkot in Sindh Chawdiji Heer Kanwarji of Mansa in Gujarat
- Issue: Kunwar Dhonkal Singh (born posthumously)
- House: Rathore
- Father: Kunwar Bhom Singh
- Mother: Chauhanji Indra Kanwarji d.of Rao Kalyan Singh of Bhawad in Marwar
- Religion: Hinduism

Maharaja Bhim Singh (? – 19 October 1803), was the Rathore Rajput ruler of the Marwar Kingdom (r. 17 July 1793 – 19 October 1803).

He seized Mehrangarh and proclaimed himself ruler in place of his grandfather on 13 April 1792. On 20 March 1793, he surrendered and retired to his personal jagir at Sawana, and again seized the fort and proclaimed himself ruler for the second time on 17 July 1793. He spent his entire reign contesting the succession with his uncles and cousins. Bhim Singh was decided to be married to Krishna Kumari of Udaipur by her father Bhim Singh of Mewar.

He died at Mehrangarh, Jodhpur on 19 October 1803.

== See also ==
- Rulers of Marwar
- Krishna Kumari (princess)
