= Krishna Kumari (princess) =

Princess of Udaipur (1794–1810)

- Born: 10 March 1794; Udaipur, Udaipur State
- Died: 21 July 1810 (aged 16); Udaipur, Udaipur State
- Father: Bhim Singh of Mewar
- Religion: Hinduism

Krishna Kumari (1794 – 21 July 1810) was a Rajput princess of the Udaipur State in the Mewar region of India. A daughter of Bhim Singh of Udaipur, she was engaged to Bhim Singh of Jodhpur at a young age. After the premature death of the groom-to-be in 1803, she was sought by multiple suitors, including Man Singh of Jodhpur and Jagat Singh of Jaipur.

The rivalry between her suitors ultimately escalated into a war involving the Rajput rulers of Udaipur, Jodhpur, and Jaipur; as well as Daulat Rao Sindhia of Gwalior, Yashwant Rao Holkar of Indore and Amir Khan Pindari of Tonk. In 1810, when Amir Khan Pindari attacked Udaipur on behalf of Man Singh, 16-year old Krishna agreed to be poisoned to death, to put an end to the war.

== Early life ==
Krishna Kumari was one of the several daughters of Bhim Singh, the Rajput ruler of the Udaipur princely state in the Mewar region. In 1799, at the age of 5, she was engaged to Bhim Singh, the Rajput ruler of the Jodhpur State in the Marwar region. However, the groom-to-be died prematurely in 1803.

== Conflict among suitors ==
After the death of Bhim Singh of Jodhpur, his cousin Man Singh succeeded him on the throne. Man Singh revoked an appanage that his predecessor had granted to Kishan Singh, a relative of Krishna's father Bhim Singh. This annoyed Krishna's father, Bhim Singh of Udaipur.

Krishna's father arranged her engagement with Jagat Singh, the Rajput ruler of the Jaipur State. Jagat Singh had become an adversary of Man Singh by supporting a rival claim to the throne of Jodhpur. Man Singh argued that Krishna was engaged to the ruler of Jodhpur, and therefore, should be married to him instead of Jagat Singh. Krishna's father rejected Man Singh's demand, and sent representatives to Jaipur to finalize her engagement with Jagat Singh.

=== Sindhia's intervention ===
Man Singh then threatened to invade Mewar, and enlisted the support of Daulat Rao Sindhia, the Maratha ruler of the Gwalior State, by paying a tribute. With help of Sindhia's commander Sarjerao Ghatge, Man Singh threatened Amar Singh of Shahpura, a feudatory of Bhim Singh of Udaipur. At this time Bhim Singh's representatives were passing through Shahpura on their way to Jaipur, and Man Singh forced Amar Singh to send them back to Udaipur.

Subsequently, Sindhia personally intervened in the dispute, hoping to play an active role in the Rajput politics. He advised Krishna's father Bhim Singh to give one of his daughters in marriage to Man Singh of Jodhpur and another to Jagat Singh of Jaipur. Sindhia also recommended that if the two suitors rejected this proposal, the dispute be resolved by involving the neighbouring rulers as arbitrators. By this time, Jagat Singh's forces had reached Udaipur, which emboldened Bhim Singh into rejecting Sindhia's proposal. Sindhia then invaded the Udaipur kingdom, and forced Bhim Singh into signing a treaty at Nathdwara on 7 May 1806.

At one point, Sindhia himself offered to marry Krishna, but the Rajputs disapproved of this proposal. Baiza Bai, one of Sindhia's wives, also opposed the proposal, arguing that the Rajputs would not agree to such a marriage without warfare. Sindhia later withdrew his proposal to marry Krishna. Yashwant Rao Holkar, the Maratha ruler of the Indore State and a rival of Sindhia, also decided to take advantage of this conflict to demand tributes from the Rajputs. This irked Krishna's father Bhim Singh, who refused to pay tribute to either of the Maratha rulers. Sindhia retreated from the Udaipur kingdom, fearing hostility from the Rajputs as well as Holkar.

=== Holkar's intervention ===
After Sindhia's retreat, Holkar offered to arbitrate the dispute. He advised that Krishna Kumari be married to someone other than Man Singh and Jagat Singh, but with the consent of these two rulers; in addition, Jagat Singh would marry a sister of Man Singh. However, Jagat Singh rejected this proposal, and insisted on marrying Krishna. Subsequently, he signed an agreement with Holkar, who promised not to object to his marriage to Krishna, and to support Jaipur against a possible attack from Sindhia. Later, Jagat Singh also won Sindhia over to his side by promising him 1 million rupees. In addition, he enlisted the support of Surat Singh of Bikaner State and Amir Khan Pindari of Tonk State. Man Singh tried to win over Holkar to his side, but Holkar decided to remain neutral.

=== Outbreak of war ===
The dispute over Krishna was being closely monitored by the East India Company. The company's Accountant General Henry St George Tucker, in a March 1806 letter to George Robinson, had mentioned that the Rajput kings were about to "take up arms for the purpose of deciding their claims to the fair hand of the Princess". Tucker expressed the possibility of a conflict involving the Rajput states, as well as Sindhia and Holkar, which would "make a very desirable diversion" in the favour of the company.

As predicted by Tucker, the conflict between Krishna's suitors ultimately escalated into a full-fledged war. Jagat Singh marched against Jodhpur, and declared Bhim Singh's posthumous son Dhonkal Singh as the rightful ruler of Jodhpur. He also convinced Holkar to remain neutral by offering a payment of 1 million rupees. Although Jagat Singh suffered some initial reverses, his army ultimately besieged Jodhpur in May 1807. Man Singh escaped to Jalore, and unsuccessfully tried to form an alliance with the East India Company. Soon after this, Jagat Singh's army was forced to leave Jodhpur because of scarcity of water, and because of defections by several Rathores, Sarjerao Ghatge and Amir Khan.

In January 1808, Jagat Singh's pro-Holkar minister Ratan Lal tried to secure Holkar's support by offering a tribute of 1 million rupees, but Holkar declined the offer. Under his influence, Jagat Singh refused to pay a tribute to Sindhia, which prompted Sindhia to invade Jaipur and extract a heavy tribute. Sindhia also attacked Udaipur, and defeated the forces of Krishna's father Bhim Singh.

=== Man Singh - Amir Khan's invasion ===
Amir Khan, who had defected to Man Singh's side for money, helped consolidated Man Singh's control over the throne of Jodhpur. In April 1810, Amir Khan demanded tribute from Udaipur and Jaipur, and invaded Udaipur. At that time, the prominent nobles of Udaipur were fighting among themselves for political power, and therefore, Udaipur forces could not put up a strong defence. Amir Khan devastated and burned the villages of the Udaipur kingdom. He then sent a message to Krishna's father Bhim Singh demanding that Krishna be either married to Man Singh or killed, because as long as she lived, there would be no peace. He threatened to destroy Bhim Singh's kingdom if this demand was not met.

== Death ==
According to a contemporary British account published in the Asiatic Annual Register for 1810-11, Amir Khan came up with the suggestion to poison Krishna "as the only mode of at once settling all their pretensions, and terminating the ten years' war, which this second Helen had excited." It is believed that the nobles of Mewar felt that the marriage would bring dishonour if it was allowed, they advised Bhim Singh that it was better to let Krishna die than suffer the supposed dishonour of having her married to Man Singh Rathore.

Bhim Singh determined that his daughter's death was necessary for establishing peace, and Krishna agreed to die by poisoning. She died of poisoning on 21 July 1810. The Asiatic Annual Register report states that her aunt administered poison to her, with the knowledge of her father. The report describes her death as "the most important political event which has lately occurred in Hindustan".

After Krishna's death, Amir Khan, the Chundawat chiefs and the Marathas fought among themselves for control of Mewar. The Udaipur State ultimately sought help from the British, and agreed to become a British protectorate in January 1818. The other parties involved in the conflict also accepted British suzerainty within a decade of her death.

== News of the princess reaches London ==
The circumstances of the princess's death were introduced to the British public by Major-General Sir John Malcolm in A Memoir of Central India, 1824. He states that his account was drawn from several persons who were on the spot at the time and he gives the princess's name as Kishen Kower.

Another source of information in Britain was Amir Khan, an active participant as noted above, whose memoirs were translated from the Persian and published in 1832. He gives her name as Kishen Koomaree (probably the correct historical pronunciation of Kumari). Amir Khan's account of her final moments states that: 'Accordingly, having bathed, and dressed herself in new and gay attire, she drank off the poison, and so gave up her precious life, earning the perpetual praise, and admiration of mankind.'

From these accounts it became common knowledge in Britain. The Asiatic Journal, June 1835, in an article on Oodipore refers to the 'well-known fate of the beautiful Kishen Kower, or Krishna Komari.'

== The literary response in Britain ==
The impact of this event on British culture is discussed by Máire ni Fhlathúin in her British India and Victorian Literary Culture

The first recorded poem on the subject, entitled Kishen Kower, is by Mrs. G. G. Richardson (Catherine Eliza Richardson) in her Poems of 1828. This is a fragment and only deals with Kishen Kower's death and what followed.

Letitia Elizabeth Landon tells the story within The Zenana, again under the heading Kishen Kower (and giving apologies for the anachronism, as the main action of this long poem is set much earlier). She introduces the princess's taking of the poison with the lines:

- And the blood of her race rushes dark to her brow,
  The spirit of heroes has entered her now.
  'Bring the death-cup, and never for my sake shall shame
  Quell the pride of my house, or dishonour its name.'

Máire ni Fhlathúin also includes versions by Anna Maria Mowatt (Kishen Kowur), Henry Thoby Prinsep (Kishen Koomaree, Princess of Oodeepoor) and Lieut.-Col. G. Poulett Cameron (in his The Romance of Military Life, 1853, Kishen Kower).

Two other prose versions can be found. The first in the Court Journal for 1835 (as Kishen Kower, anonymously). In this version, the princess survives two cups of the poison but is then stabbed to death by a kinsman. A second, more extended version of the story, appeared in The East India Sketch-book, 1836 (Elizabeth Bruce Elton Smith), entitled The Three Moons.
