= Ari Singh II =

Maharana of Mewar from 1762 to 1772

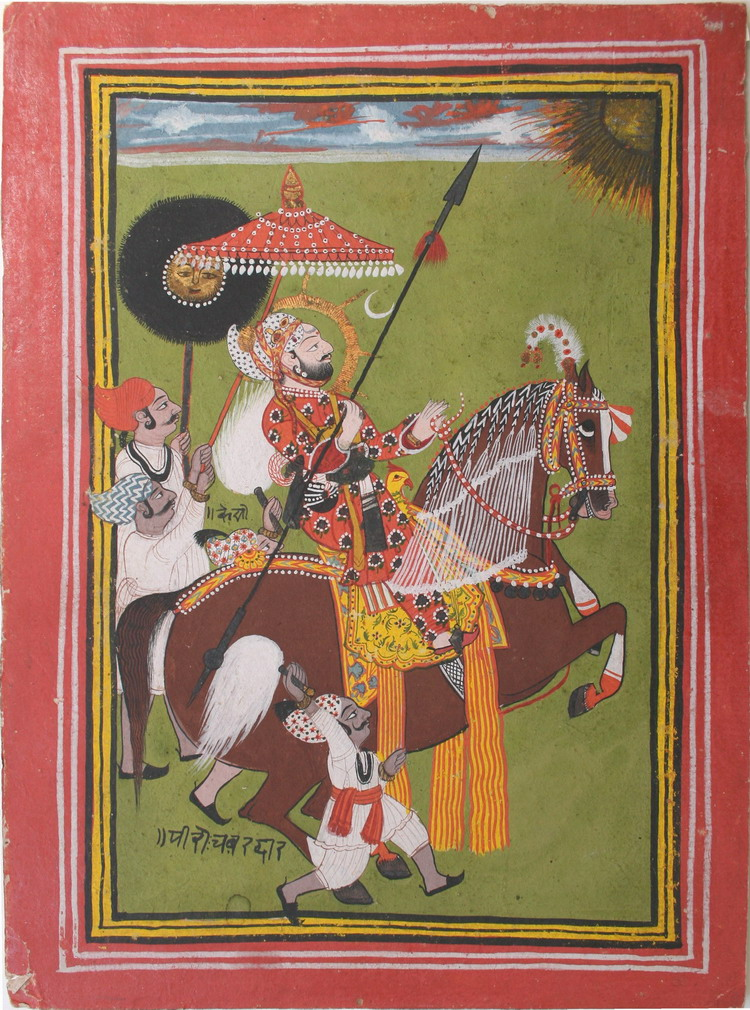
- Ari Singh II

Maharana of the Kingdom of Mewar
- Reign: 1762–1773
- Predecessor: Raj Singh II
- Successor: Hamir Singh II
- Born: 27 July 1724
- Died: 9 March 1773 (aged 48)
- Spouses: Jhaliji Sardar Kanwarji of Gogunda in Mewar; Devadiji Amrit Kanwarji from Sirohi; Bhatiyaniji Guman Kanwarji of Mohi in Mewar; Rathorji Saras Kanwarji of Ratlam; Rathorji Gyan Kanwarji of Idar; Chauhanji Radha Kanwarji of Kotharia in Mewar; Devadiji Amrit Kanwarji from Sirohi; Bhatiyaniji Guman Kanwarji of Mohi in Mewar; Rathorji Saras Kanwarji of Ratlam State in the Kingdom of Malwa; Chauhanji Radha Kanwarji of Kotharia in Mewar
- Issue: Sons: Hamir Singh II; Bhim Singh; Daughters: Chandra Kanwarji; Anup Kanwarji
- House: Ranawat Sisodia
- Father: Jagat Singh II
- Mother: Jhaliji Amar Kanwarji d.of Thakore Raj Abhaysinhji of Lakhtar in Gujarat

Maharana Ari Singh II (after 27 July 1724 – 9 March 1773) was the Maharana of the Kingdom of Mewar. His accession to the throne was controversial as he was alleged to have made his way clear and unopposed by killing Kunwar Ratan Singh, the only child of his nephew and predecessor Maharana Raj Singh II (born 1743, r. 1754–1761).

The younger brother of Maharana Pratap Singh II, Ari Singh II came to the throne on the death of Pratap's son and heir, Raj Singh II, who had succeeded his father at the age of 11, reigning for seven years. Ari Singh acceded in 1762, reigning for eleven years, until his assassination by Maharao Ajit Singhji of Bundi on 9 March 1773; in turn, Ajit Singhji lived only a few months after the killing of Ari Singh.

Ari Singh was said to have an uncontrollable temper, which caused chieftains and nobles of Mewar to distance themselves from Ari Singh. This added to the decline of power of Mewar. The nobles who left the Mewar court formed a group. This group planned to kill Ari Singh and place the posthumous son of his predecessor, Ratna Singh as the ruler. Though Ratna Singh succeeded in temporarily occupying Kumbhalgarh, he was later defeated.

During Ari Singh's reign, the Marathas were weakened throughout India, but Mahadaji Scindia restored Maratha power in the North. He formed an alliance with the Maratha against the Mughal Empire.
