= Jagat Singh II =

Maharana of Mewar from 1734 to 1751

Maharana Jagat Singh II
- Maharana of Mewar
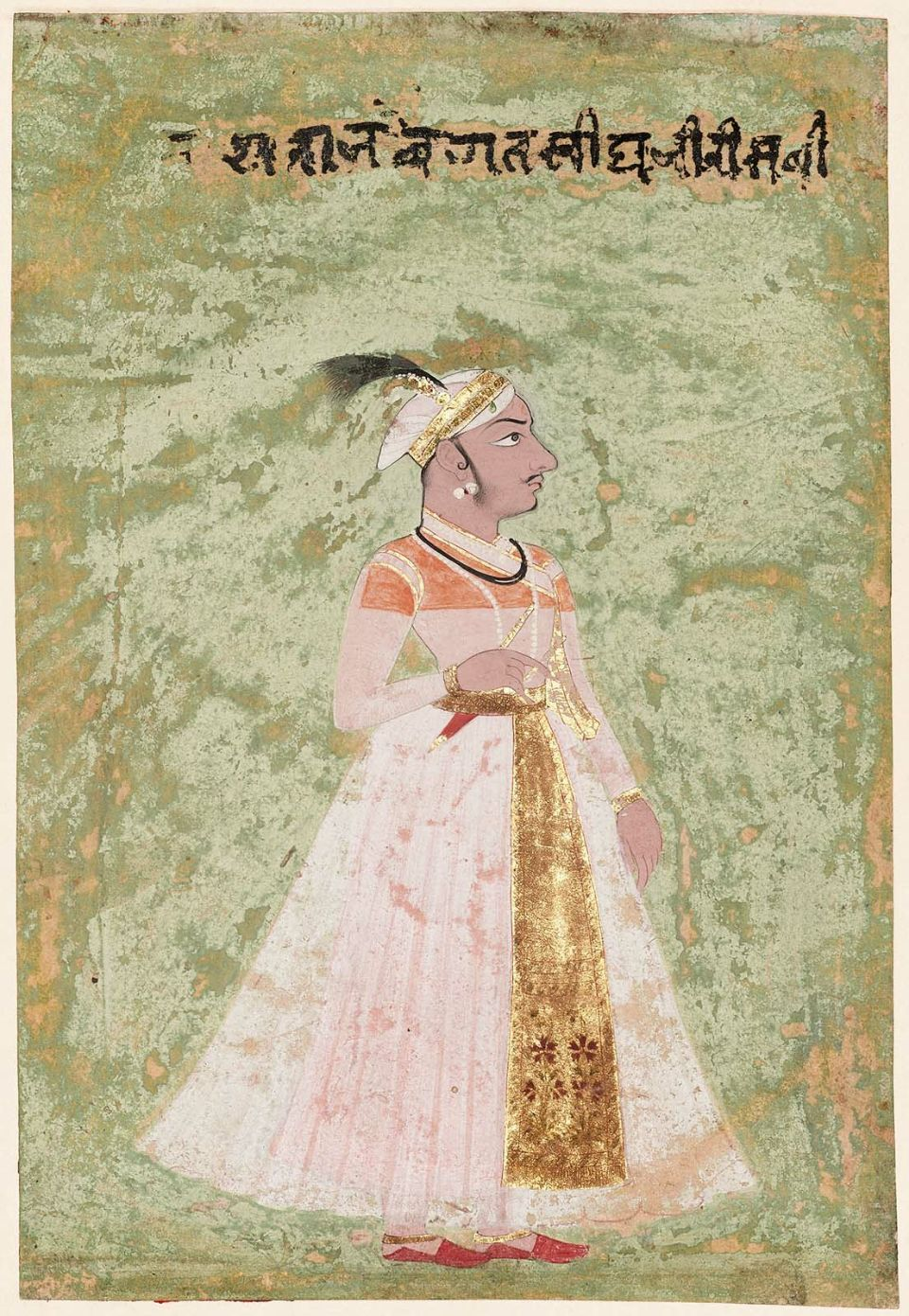
- Depiction of a young Jagat Singh II

Maharana of Mewar
- Reign: 11 January 1734 – 5 June 1751
- Predecessor: Sangram Singh II
- Successor: Pratap Singh II
- Born: 17 September 1709
- Died: 5 June 1751 (aged 41)
- Spouse: Solankiniji Man Kanwarji of Lunawada in Gujarat Rathorji Kalyan Kanwarji of Idar Bhatiyaniji Bakht Kanwarji from Jaisalmer Mertaniji Umaid Kanwarji of Ghanerao in Mewar Jhaliji Amar Kanwarji of Lakhtar in Gujarat Chawdiji Takht Kanwarji of Varsoda in Gujarat Devariji Phool Kanwarji of Sirohi Jhaliji Deep Kanwarji of Delwara in Mewar Hadiji Indra Kanwarji of Indragarh in Kota
- Issue: Pratap Singh II Ari Singh II Ratan Kanwarji m.to Maharaja Vijay Singh of Marwar Amrit Kanwarji m.to Rao Abhai Singh of Chadawad in Malwa Suraj Kanwarji (marriage not known)
- House: Ranawat Sisodia
- Dynasty: Sisodias of Mewar
- Father: Sangram Singh II
- Mother: Parmarji Umaid Kanwarji d.of Rao Mukund Singh of Bambori in Mewar

Maharana Jagat Singh II (17 September 1709 – 5 June 1751), was the Sisodia Rajput ruler of Mewar Kingdom (r. 1734 – 1751). He being the eldest among his brothers succeeded to the throne of Mewar.

He spent the fortunes of his kingdom while trying to place his nephew, Kunwar Madho Singh I on the throne of Jaipur, he was defeated at the Battle of Rajamahal by Sawai Ishwari Singh the elder step brother of Madho Singh and forced to pay heavy tributes to the Kachwaha house Jaipur. He was also unable to pay his mercenaries which ravaged his country.
