= Swarup Singh of Udaipur =

Maharana of Udaipur from 1842–1861

Swarup Singh
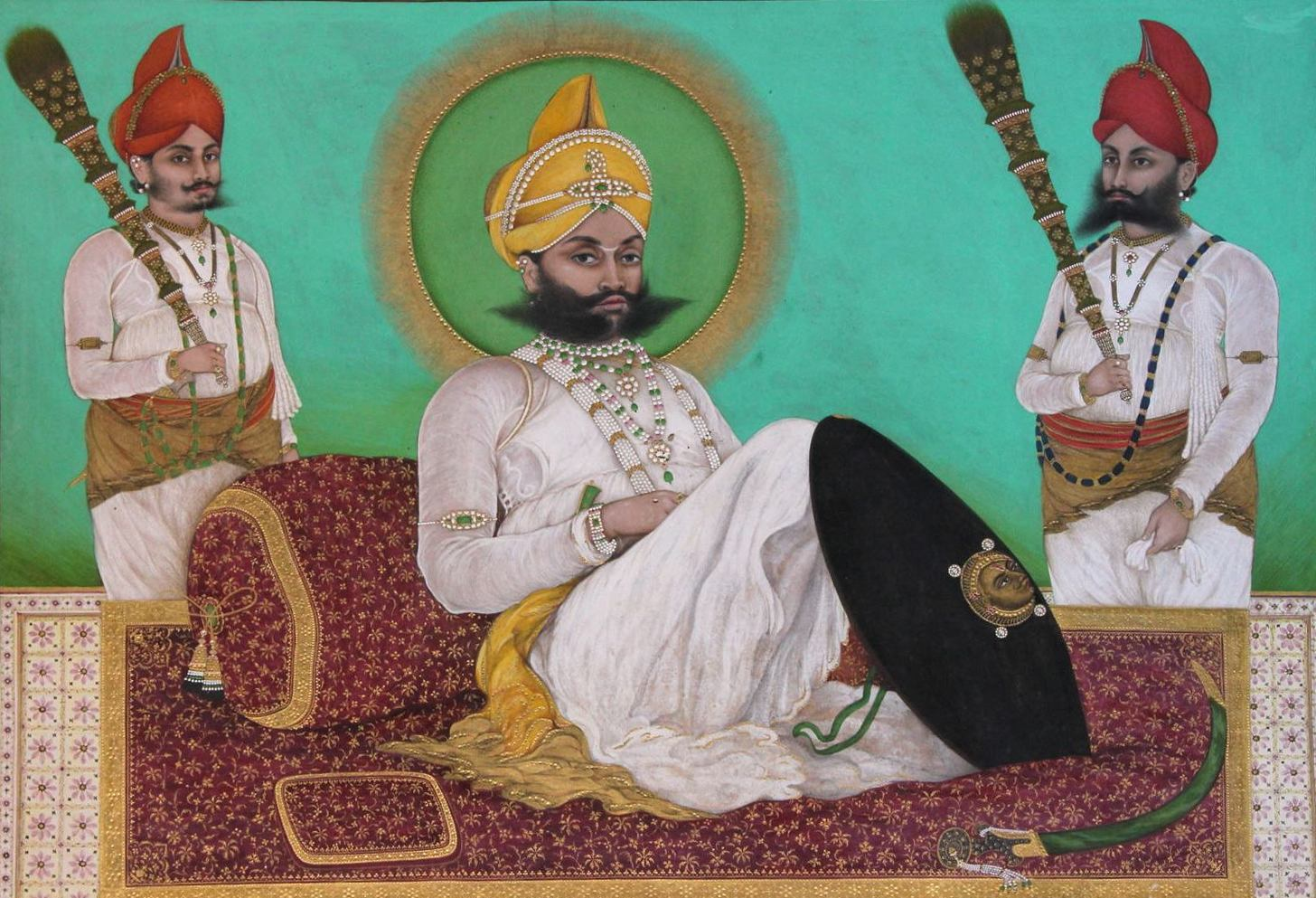
- Portrait of Swarup Singh with attendants, by the court painter Tara (active 1836-1870), after William Carpenter, Udaipur, 1851.

Maharana of Udaipur
- Reign: 1842–61
- Predecessor: Sardar Singh
- Successor: Shambhu Singh
- Born: 8 January 1815
- Died: 17 November 1861 (aged 46)
- Spouse: Rathorji Gulab Kanwarji Chawdiji Phool Kanwarji of Kaladwas in Mewar Bhatiyaniji Chand Kanwarji of Barsalpur in Bikaner Rathorji (Mertaniji) Abhai Kanwarji of Ghanerao in Marwar
- Issue: No Issue
- House: Ranawat-Sisodia
- Father: Shivdan Singh of Bagore
- Mother: Kachwahiji (Balbhadrotji) Ugra Kanwarji of Achrol in Jaipur

Maharana Swarup Singh (or Sarup Singh) (8 January 1815 – 17 November 1861) was the Sisodia Rajput ruler of Udaipur State previously Kingdom of Mewar (r. 1842–1861). He was the biological son of Maharaj Shivdan Singh of Bagore branch of the family but was adopted by his elder brother Maharana Sardar Singh. His reign spanned the Indian Rebellion of 1857 although he remained on the sidelines, as a party to the 1818 treaty with the English East India Company signed by Maharaja Bhim Singh. He died in the year 1861 four years later after the Indian rebellion. He was succeeded by his nephew Shambhu Singh, son of his brother Kunwar Sher Singh.

== See also ==
Media related to Swarup Singh of Udaipur at Wikimedia Commons
