= Shambhu Singh =

Maharana of Udaipur from 1861–1874

Sir Shambhu Singh
- Maharana
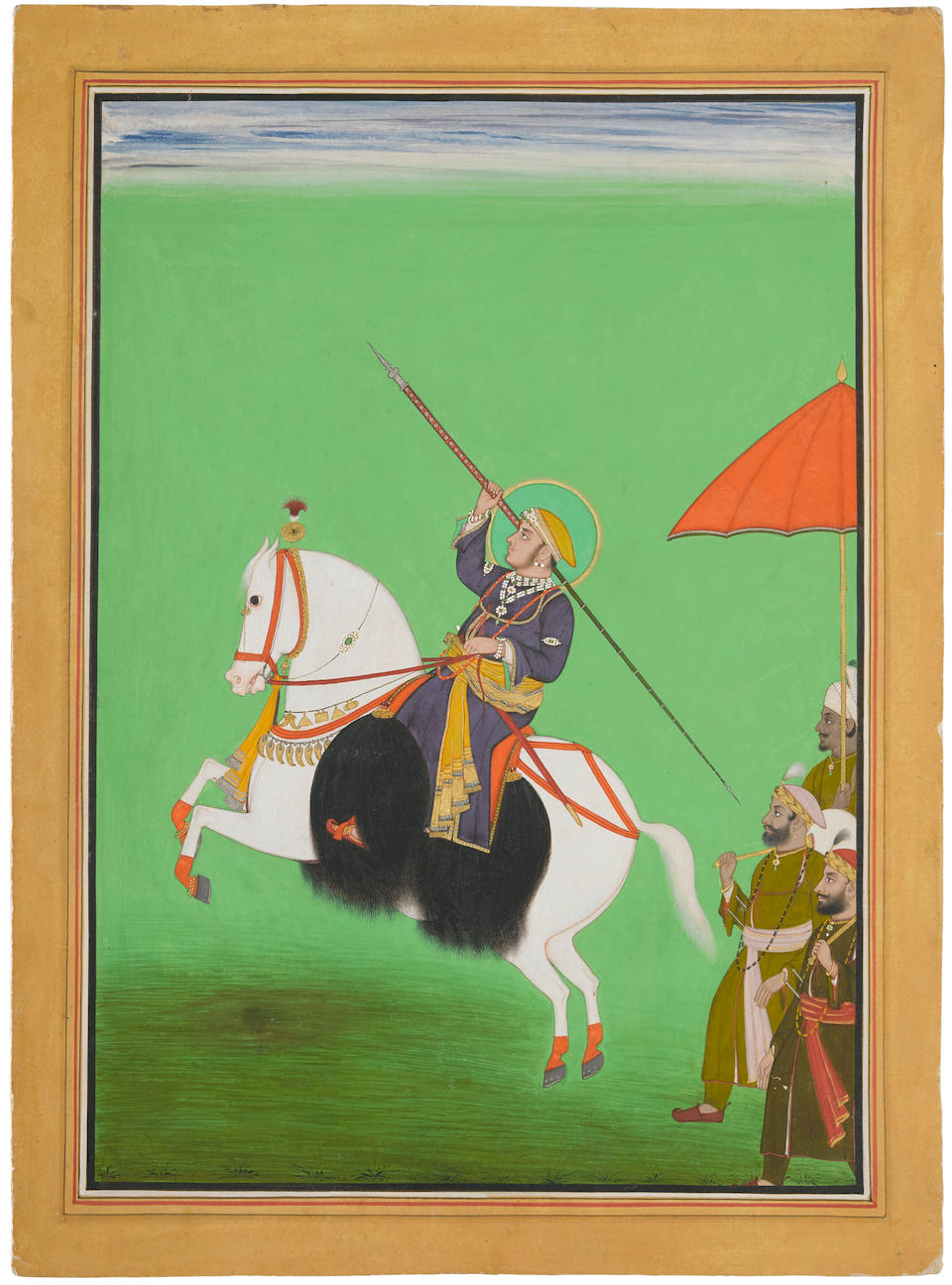
- Maharana Shambhu Singh throwing a javelin, By court painter Tara (active 1836-1870), Mewar 1866

Maharana of Udaipur
- Reign: 1861–74
- Predecessor: Swarup Singh
- Successor: Sajjan Singh
- Born: 22 December 1847
- Died: 7 October 1874 (aged 26)
- Spouse: HH Maharaniji Sa Chauhanji Shri Indra Kanwarji Saheba of Garhi in Banswara State HH Maharaniji Sa Jhaliji Shri Daulat Kanwarji Saheba of Bari Sadri in Udaipur State
- Issue: No Issue
- House: Ranawat-Sisodia
- Father: Sher Singh of Bagore
- Mother: Rathorji (Bikawatji) Nand Kanwarji Maji Saheba d.of Rajvi Sagat/Shakti Singh of Chatragarh in Bikaner State

Maharana Sir Shambhu Singh GCSI (22 December 1847 – 7 October 1874), was the Sisodia Rajput ruler of the Princely State of Udaipur reigning from 1861 to 1874. He was a son Kunwar Sher Singh of Bagore and nephew of his childless uncle and predecessor Maharana Swarup Singh.

The rich and diverse land of India had faced numerous invasions and marauding before the British set their foot as merchants and slowly took over the dominance of the Indian main land. With the great India rebellion of 1857, the governance of India was transferred to the Queen of England and a new era had begun with Maharana Shambhu Singh ascending the throne of Mewar.

He was a descendant of Maharana Sangram Singh II; was adopted by Maharana Swarup Singh as his nominated heir. Maharana Shambhu Singh ascended the throne as a minor and a British Political agent was appointed to guide the young Maharana. Unlike his predecessors, the financial conditions at the time were relatively stable and progressive and he continued to replenish the state treasury after he was provided full powers as the ruler of Mewar.

After attaining complete control, he set up various new rules and offices for improving administrative resources, organised administration and income of temples and sacred places and introduced new legal code for Mewar. Under him the military was reorganised, various jail reforms were introduced and new construction of roads and railway tracks started. In spite of being formally uneducated, he gave education supreme importance and expanded various existing schools and introduced numerous new ones. Most importantly, he was the first to set up a school for girls and thus promoted opportunities of education for everyone. He enforced special measures to curb the Sati pratha and imposed heavy monetary fines on offenders.

Thus with various reforms in public facilities and infrastructure, Shambhu Singh was considered a liberal and well-managed king of his times. But with his untimely death at a young age of 27 years, his dreams of the revival of his homeland to the ancient golden times were stalled. He left behind no heir and his nephew Sajjan Singh, who himself was a minor at the time of his death; succeeded him and went ahead in continuation with the reforms paved by his predecessor.
