= Pratap Singh II =

Maharana of Mewar from 1751 to 1754

Maharana Pratap Singh II
- Maharana of Mewar
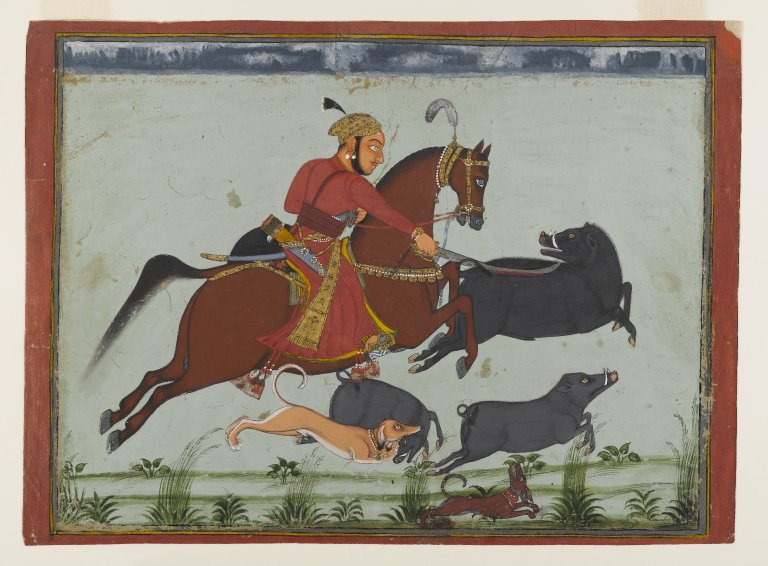
- Pratap Singh II

Maharana of Mewar
- Reign: 5 June 1751 – 10 January 1754
- Predecessor: Jagat Singh II
- Successor: Raj Singh II
- Born: 27 July 1724
- Died: 10 January 1754 (aged 29)
- Spouse: Rathorji Saubhag Kanwarji of Jodhpur-Marwar; Jhaliji Bakht Kanwarji of Lakhtar in Gujarat; Kachwahiji Roop Kanwarji of Jhalai in Jaipur
- Issue: Raj Singh II
- Father: Jagat Singh II
- Mother: Solankiniji Man Kanwarji d.of Rana Raj Naharsinhji of Lunawada in Gujarat
- Religion: Hinduism

Maharana Pratap Singh II (27 July 1724 – 10 January 1754) was the Sisodia Rajput ruler of Mewar Kingdom from 1751 to 1754. His short reign saw the decline of the Sisodia house of Mewar in Rajputana, both economically and politically.
