= Raj Singh II =

Maharana of Mewar from 1754 to 1761

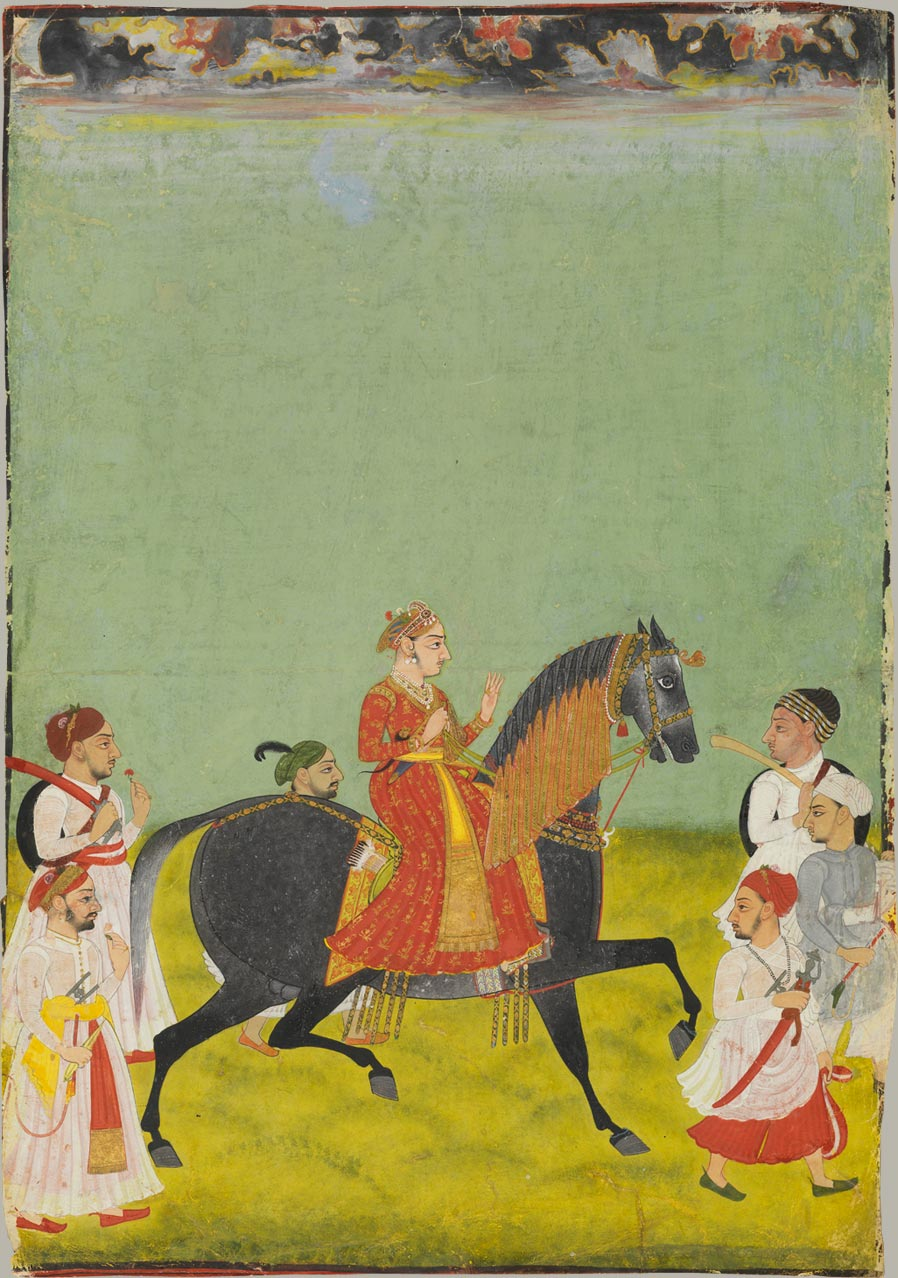
- Equestrian portrait of Maharana Raj Singh II

Maharana of Mewar
- Reign: 10 January 1754 – 3 April 1761
- Predecessor: Pratap Singh II
- Successor: Ari Singh II
- Born: 25 April 1743
- Died: 3 April 1761 (aged 17)
- Spouse: Chauhanji Gulab Kanwarji of Bedla in Mewar Jhaliji Saras Kanwarji of Gogunda in Mewar Rathorji Sardar Kanwarji of Ratlam in Malwa Rathorji Sardar Kanwarji of Idar
- Issue: Kunwar Ratan Singh (died young)
- House: Ranawat Sisodia
- Father: Pratap Singh II
- Mother: Jhaliji Bakht Kanwarji d.of Thakore Raj Gopalsinhji of Lakhtar in Gujarat

Maharana Raj Singh II (25 April 1743 – 3 April 1761), was the Maharana of Mewar Kingdom from 1754 until his death in 1761. He was the only son of Maharana Pratap Singh II born posthumously and was declared successor to his father under the care of his paternal uncle Maharana Ari Singh II who after a turbulent reign of his nephew became the succeeding Maharana .
