= Charan Badi Amolak Cheej =

19th-century Dingal poem

Charan Badi Amolak Cheej (IAST: Cāraṇa Baḍī Amolaka Cīja; Devnagari: चारण बड़ी अमोलक चीज; transl. The Charans are verily invaluable.) is a 19th-century short Dingal (Marwari) poem written by Maharaja Man Singh of Marwar. The poem is divided into 5 stanzas and praises the Charanas extolling their virtues and importance in the royal courts of medieval India.

== Lyrics ==
Dingal(Source:)
IAST Romanization
English translation

Translation: Kailash Dan Ujjwal; Source:

अकल विद्या चित उजला, अधको धरमाचार ।
वधता रजपूतां विचै, चारण वातां च्यार ।

Akala Vidyā Cita Ujalā, Adhako Dharamācāra ।
Vadhatā Rajapūtāṃ Vicai, Cāraṇa Vātāṃ Cyāra ।

The Charans excel the Rajput in four things namely brains, education, purity of heart and religious piety.

आछा गुण कहण बाण पण आछी, मोख बुध में न को मणा ।
राजां सुजश चहुं जुग राखे, ताकव दीपक छमा तणा ।

āchā guṇa kahaṇa bāṇa paṇa āchī, mokha budha meṃ na ko maṇā ।
rājāṃ sujaśa cahuṃ juga rākhe, tākava dīpaka chamā taṇā ।

The Charans, capable of discerning distinction describe it well, and thus, spread the fame of good kings around.They are very intelligent and illuminate the Court by their presence.

भूपालां बातां हद भावे,
शब्द सवा वे घणा सकाज ।
देह दराज दीशता डारणा,
राजां बीच सोहे कवराज ।

bhūpālāṃ bātāṃ hada bhāve, śabda savā ve ghaṇā sakāja ।
deha darāja dīśatā ḍāraṇā, rājāṃ bīca sohe kavarāja ।

Kings immensely relish their conversation; their impressive physique and handsome features give these poet-kings (Charans) a regal bearing and as such they do not look out of place among Kings.

राजी सख सभा ने राखे,
सहज सभावों घणा शिरे ।
धजवड़ हथां मारका घूतां,
कव रजपूतां अमर करे ।

rājī sakha sabhā ne rākhe, sahaja sabhāvoṃ ghaṇā śire ।
dhajavaḍā hathāṃ mārakā ghūtāṃ, kava rajapūtāṃ amara kare ।

They keep the gathering in good humour and excel in good behaviour. These poets immortalise the valiant Rajputs and are themselves great warriors.

आखे मान सुणों अधपतिया, खत्रियों कोई न करजों खीज ।
वरदायक वहतां मद करण, चारण बड़ी अमोलक चीज ।

ākhe māna suṇoṃ adhapatiyā, khatriyoṃ koī na karajoṃ khīja ।
varadāyaka vahatāṃ mada karaṇa, cāraṇa baḍī amolaka cīja ।

Listen to Mann, and resent not, O! Kings, the Charans are verily invaluable.
