= Sardar Singh of Udaipur =

Maharana of Udaipur from 1838–1842

Sardar Singh
- Maharana of Mewar
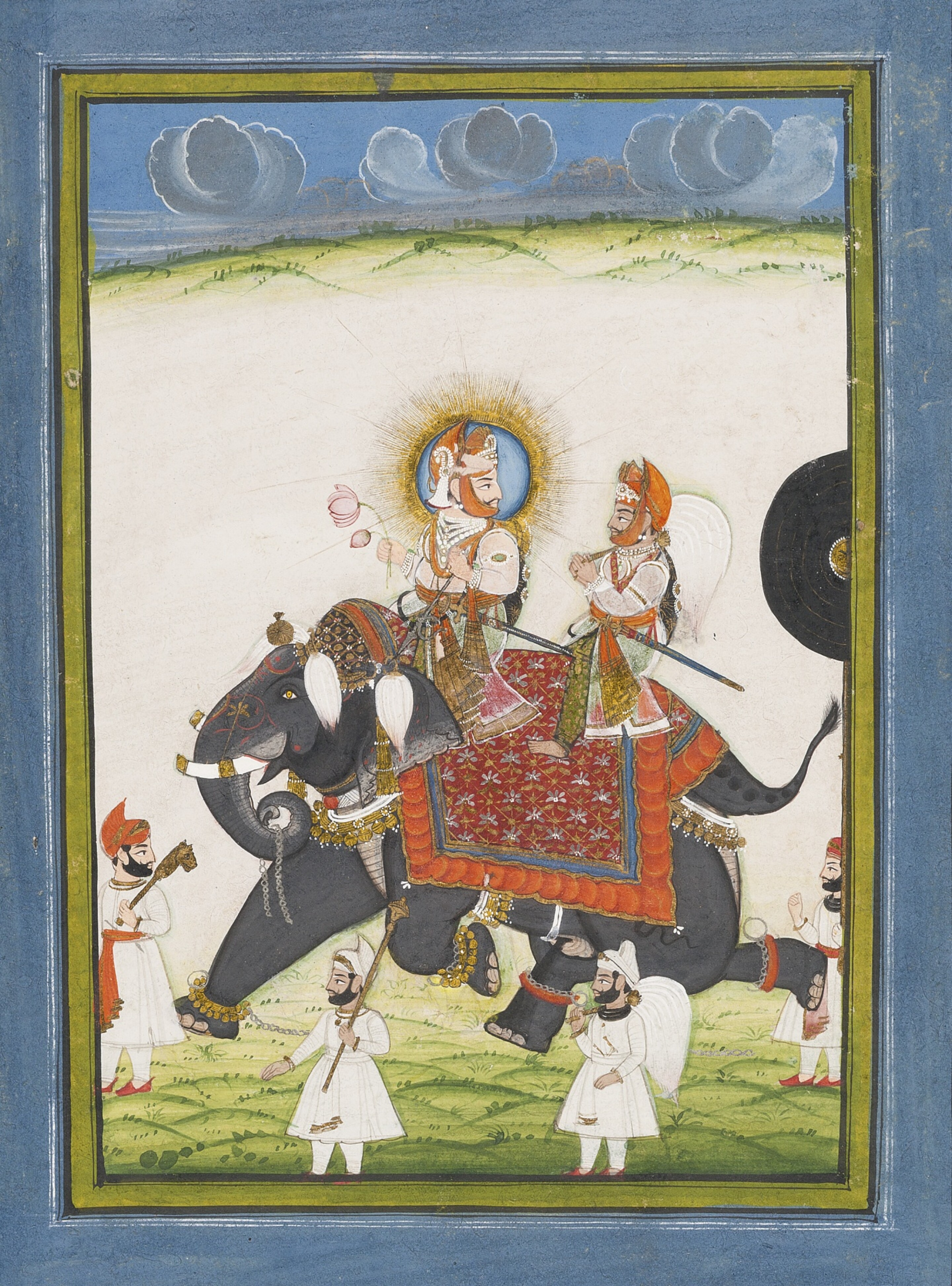
- Maharana Sardar Singh of Udaipur riding an elephant

Maharana of Udaipur
- Reign: 1838–42
- Predecessor: Jawan Singh
- Successor: Swarup Singh
- Born: 29 August 1798; Bagore Haveli,Bagore, Mewar
- Died: 14 July 1842 (aged 43); City Palace Udaipur, Mewar
- Spouse: Rathorji (Bikawatji) Gulab Kanwarji of Bikaner Jhaliji Chandra Kanwarji of Gogunda in Mewar Solankiniji of Roopnagar in Mewar Kachwahiji (Bankawatji) of Lawan in Jaipur Bhatiyaniji (Rawalotji) of Muroli in Mewar
- Issue: Baiji Lal Mehtab Kanwarji m.to Maharaja Sardar Singh of Bikaner Baiji Lal Phool Kanwarji m.to Maharao Ram Singh II of Kota Baiji Lal Saubhag Kanwarji m.to Maharaja Raghuraj Singh Ju Dev of Rewa in Baghelkhand
- House: Ranawat-Sisodia
- Father: Maharaj Shivdan Singh of Bagore
- Mother: Chawdiji Gulab Kanwarji of Arjiya in Mewar

Maharana Sardar Singh (29 August 1798 – 14 July 1842) was the Sisodia Rajput ruler of Mewar(r. 1838–1842). He was the great grandson of Maharana Sangram Singh II, grandson of Maharaj Nath Singh of Bagore, son of Maharaj Shivdan Singh of Bagore who were the "Thikanedars" i.e a hereditary fief under their parent state of Mewar. He was adopted by his childless predecessor Maharana Jawan Singh to succeed him. Having died heirless was in turn succeeded by his brother Swarup Singh.
