= Hamir Singh II =

Maharana of Mewar from 1772 to 1778

Maharana Hamir Singh II
- Maharana of Mewar

Maharana of Mewar
- Reign: 1772–6 January 1778
- Predecessor: Ari Singh II
- Successor: Bhim Singh
- Born: 1762
- Died: 6 January 1778 (aged 15–16)
- Spouse: Rathorji (Kishansinghot) Amar Kanwarji d.of Maharaja Birad Singh of Kishangarh
- Father: Ari Singh II
- Mother: Jhaliji Sardar Kanwarji d.of Rana Kanha Singh of Gogunda in Mewar

Maharana Hamir Singh II (1762 – 6 January 1778) was the Sisodia Rajput ruler of Mewar Kingdom (r. 1772–1778). He was the eldest son of Maharana Ari Singh II. He died at the age of 16 when a rifle burst in his hand. After his death his younger brother Bhim Singh became the next Maharana of Mewar.
