= Sajjan Singh of Udaipur =

Maharana of Udaipur from 1874–1884

Sir Sajjan Singh
- Maharana; Hindua Suraj
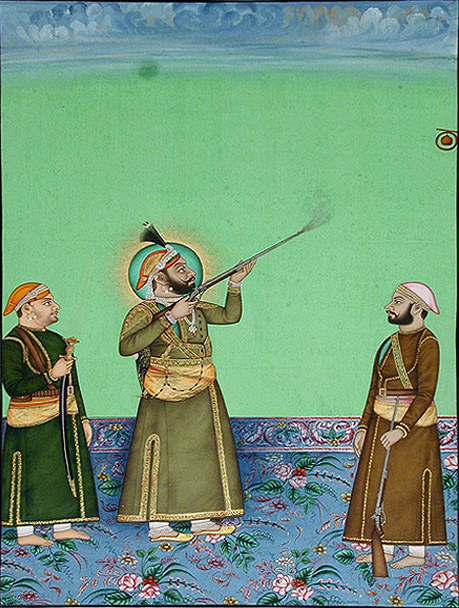
- Maharana Sajjan Singh shoots at an apple

Maharana of Udaipur
- Reign: 1874–84
- Predecessor: Shambhu Singh
- Successor: Fateh Singh
- Born: 18 July 1859
- Died: 23 December 1884 (aged 25)
- Spouse: HH Maharaniji Sa Bada Rathorji (Idarniji) Shri Takht Kanwarji Saheba of Idar State HH Maharaniji Sa Rathorji (Jodhiji) Shri Jawahar Kanwarji Saheba of Kishangarh State HH Maharaniji Sa Chota Rathorji (Idarniji) Shri Kesar Kanwarji Saheba of Idar State
- Issue: Maharajkumarji Surya Singh (died infant) by the 3rd Maharani
- House: Ranawat-Sisodia
- Father: Maharaj Shakti Singh of Bagore
- Mother: Rathorji (Kishansinghot) Roop Kanwarji Maji Saheba d.of Raja Shardul Singh of Gangwana in Kishangarh State

Colonel HH Maharajadhiraj Maharana Sir Sajjan Singh GCSI (18 July 1859 – 23 December 1884), was the Sisodia Rajput ruler of the Princely State of Udaipur (r. 1874 – 1884). He was a son of Maharaj Shakti Singh of Bagore and was adopted by his childless first cousin Maharana Shambhu Singh whom he succeeded in the year 1874. He adopted Fateh Singh a descendant of Maharana Sangram Singh II from the Shivrati branch of the family.
