= Bhim Singh of Mewar =

Maharana of Mewar from 1778–1818 and first Maharana of Udaipur from 1818-1828

Maharana Bhim Singh
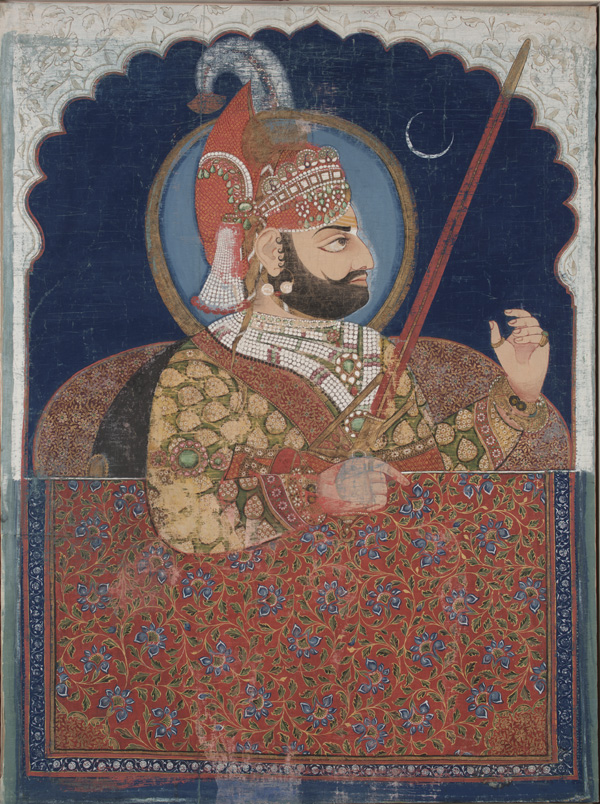
- Maharana Bhim Singh

Maharana of Udaipur
- Reign: 1818–30 March 1828
- Successor: Jawan Singh

26th Maharana of Mewar
- Reign: 6 January 1778–1818
- Predecessor: Hamir Singh II
- Born: 10 March 1768
- Died: 30 March 1828 (aged 60)
- Spouse: Rathorji Akshay Kanwarji of Idar; Jhaliji Roop Kanwarji of Dhrangadhra in Gujarat; Rathorji Ratan Kanwarji from Ratlam; Rathorji Gulab Kanwarji of Idar; Vagheliji Kushal Kanwarji of Gangad in Gujarat; Chawdiji Gulab Kanwarji of Varsoda in Gujarat; Bhatiyaniji Jait Kanwarji of Mohi in Mewar; Devadiji Sardar Kanwarji of Sirohi; Rathorji Umaid Kanwarji of Idar; Rathorji Padam Kanwarji of Bikaner; Rathorji Chandra Kanwarji of Idar; Jhaliji Braj Kanwarji of Lakhtar in Gujarat; Jhaliji Saubhag Kanwarji of Tana in Mewar; Bhatiyaniji Suraj Kanwarji from Jaisalmer; Hadiji Kishor Kanwarji of Kota
- Issue: Amar Singh (died young) Jawan Singh Umaid Singh (died early) Prithvi Singh (died early) Krishna Kumari (died young) Ajab Kanwarji m. to Maharaja Ratan Singh of Bikaner Roop Kanwarji m. to Maharawal Gaj Singh of Jaisalmer}}
- House: Ranawat Sisodia
- Father: Ari Singh II
- Mother: Jhaliji Sardar Kanwarji d.of Rana Kanha Singh of Gogunda in Mewar
- Religion: Hinduism

Maharana Bhim Singh (10 March 1768 – 30 March 1828) was the 26th Sisodia Rajput ruler (r. 1778–1828) of the Kingdom of Mewar who became the first Maharana of Udaipur State. (Note: Also called the Princely state of Udaipur) He was the second son of Maharana Ari Singh II and younger brother of his predecessor Maharana Hamir Singh II.

At ten years of age Maharana Bhim Singh succeeded his brother Maharana Hamir Singh II who had untimely died at the age of 16 from a wound when a rifle burst in his hand. Maharana Hamir Singh II had ruled an unstable state with an empty treasury under a regency by Maharaj Bagh Singh and Arjun Singh his grand-uncles and widowed mother Jhaliji Sardar Kanwarji.Maharana Bhim Singh inherited this unstable state after its unpaid Maratha soldiers had looted Mewar's former capital Chittor. The soldiers' depredations continued and more territory was lost during Bhim Singh's rule. Another significant event in his reign was his daughter Krishna Kumari had died by drinking poison at the age of 16 to save his dynasty and prevent a massive civil war among the rajput houses of Rajputana in 1810.

Maharana Bhim Singh was unable to lead his house of Mewar as a political power in Rajputana unlike his illustrious and effectual ancestors. Mewar had once been considered the strongest Rajput house because of its lengthy resistance to the foreign emperors but by 13 January 1818, Maharana Bhim Singh had to sign a treaty with the British East India Company accepting their protection.

On the birth of his heir Yuvraj Amar Singh by his queen Rathorji Gulab Kanwarji, Bhim Singh along with his nobles travelled on foot to visit the Eklingji temple where he had an inscription engraved in the temple promulgating orders to abolish certain taxes from Charanas and Brahmins.

Upon his death in the year 1828, his four queens and four concubines committed sati as the prevalent Rajput tradition dictated.
