= Abagor =

Abagor (Russian: Абаго́р), and its colloquial form Bagor (Баго́р), is an old and rare Russian male first name. Included into various, often handwritten, church calendars throughout the 17th–19th centuries, it was omitted from the official Synodal Menologium at the end of the 19th century. It is possibly derived from Biblical Hebrew where it meant father of Gor. The patronymics derived from this first name are "Абаго́рович" (Abagorovich; masculine) and "Абаго́ровна" (Abagorovna; feminine).
