= Man Singh of Marwar =

Maharaja of Marwar and Jodhpur (1783–1843)

Maharaja Man Singh
- Maharaja of Jodhpur
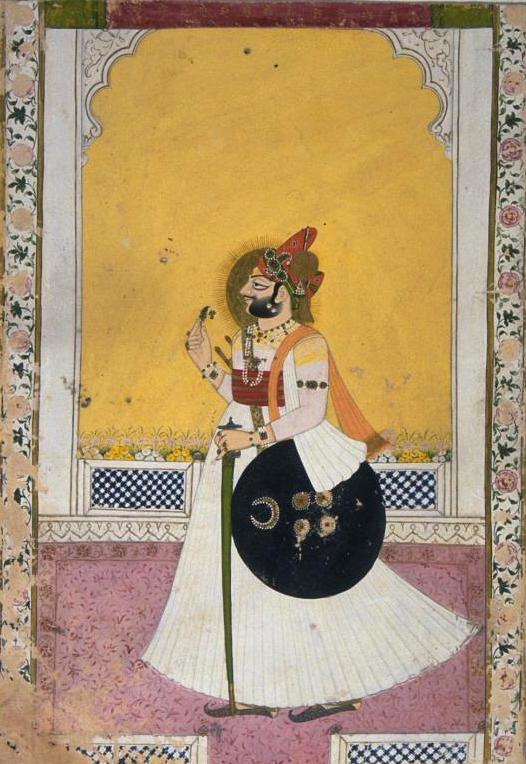
- Man Singh

Ruler of Jodhpur
- Tenure: 19 October 1803 – 4 September 1843
- Coronation: Mehrangarh, Jodhpur, 17 January 1804
- Predecessor: Bhim singh
- Successor: Takht Singh
- Born: 3 February 1783
- Died: 4 September 1843 (aged 60); Mandore
- Father: Guman Singh
- Mother: Chauhani Kanwar
- Religion: Hinduism

Man Singh (3 February 1783 – 4 September 1843) was the last independent Maharaja of Marwar Kingdom and Jodhpur State (r. 19 October 1803 – 4 September 1843). He was appointed as Heir Apparent by his grandfather Vijay Singh on 7 November 1791. However upon Vijay Singh's death, Bhim Singh seized Jodhpur and proclaimed himself as the ruler of Marwar.

Man Singh was sent to Jalore for his own safety, where he remained throughout the reign of his cousin, Bhim Singh of Marwar.

He succeeded on his cousin's death on 19 October 1803. In 1804 Man Singh broke the treaty with the British for cooperation and formed an alliance with Yashwantrao Holkar, however Jodhpur was invaded by Sindhia and was forced to break their alliance with Holkar and pay heavy tribute.

Opposed by many of his principal nobles throughout his reign, he depended on the support of successive factions. The last of these were the Nath family, the Maharaja's spiritual advisers, who came to control state affairs and turned him into a recluse. Many of the nobles fled to neighbouring principalities, state repression having become entirely vengeful and cold-blooded.

Man Singh, after finding it unbearable to see his kingdom get destroyed by the Sindhias and his own corrupt nobles and ministers, entered into treaty relations with the British on 6 January 1818.

== Siege of Mehrangarh ==
In 1806 the combined armies of Jaipur, Bikaner and Mewar declared war on Marwar in order to install a pretender as the Maharaja of Marwar. However, Man Singh defeated the combined army so comprehensively that Jagat Singh of Jaipur had to pay a sum of Rs. 2,00,000 to secure his safe passage. In honour of Man's victory over Jaipur the Jai Pol, or victory gate of, was built in the Mehrangarh fort in 1808.

== Asylum to Nagpur ruler ==
In 1829, Man Singh gave shelter to Mudhoji II Bhonsle, also known as Appa Sahib, the dethroned ruler of Nagpur against the wishes of British. He refused to hand him over to the British in spite of persistent demands by Governor General Lord William Bentinck. Appa Sahib remained in Jodhpur at Man Mandir till his death in 1840.

== Death and legacy ==
Man Singh died at Mandore, 4th September 1843.

== Works ==
Man Singh was a eminent poet and scholar of his time and had composed several poems and texts.

- Charan Badi Amolak Cheej
- Nath-Purana
- Nath-Sharot
- Nath-Shatak
- Siddha-Gyan

== See also ==
- Rulers of Marwar
