= Varsoda =

Village in Gujarat state, India

Coordinates: 23.423°N 72.747°E

Varsoda is a small village located in Mansa, Gujarat, on the bank of the Sabarmati River, formerly the seat of an eponymous Rajput princely state. It is approximately 25 kilometres (16 mi) from Gandhinagar, the state capital of Gujarat.

== History ==
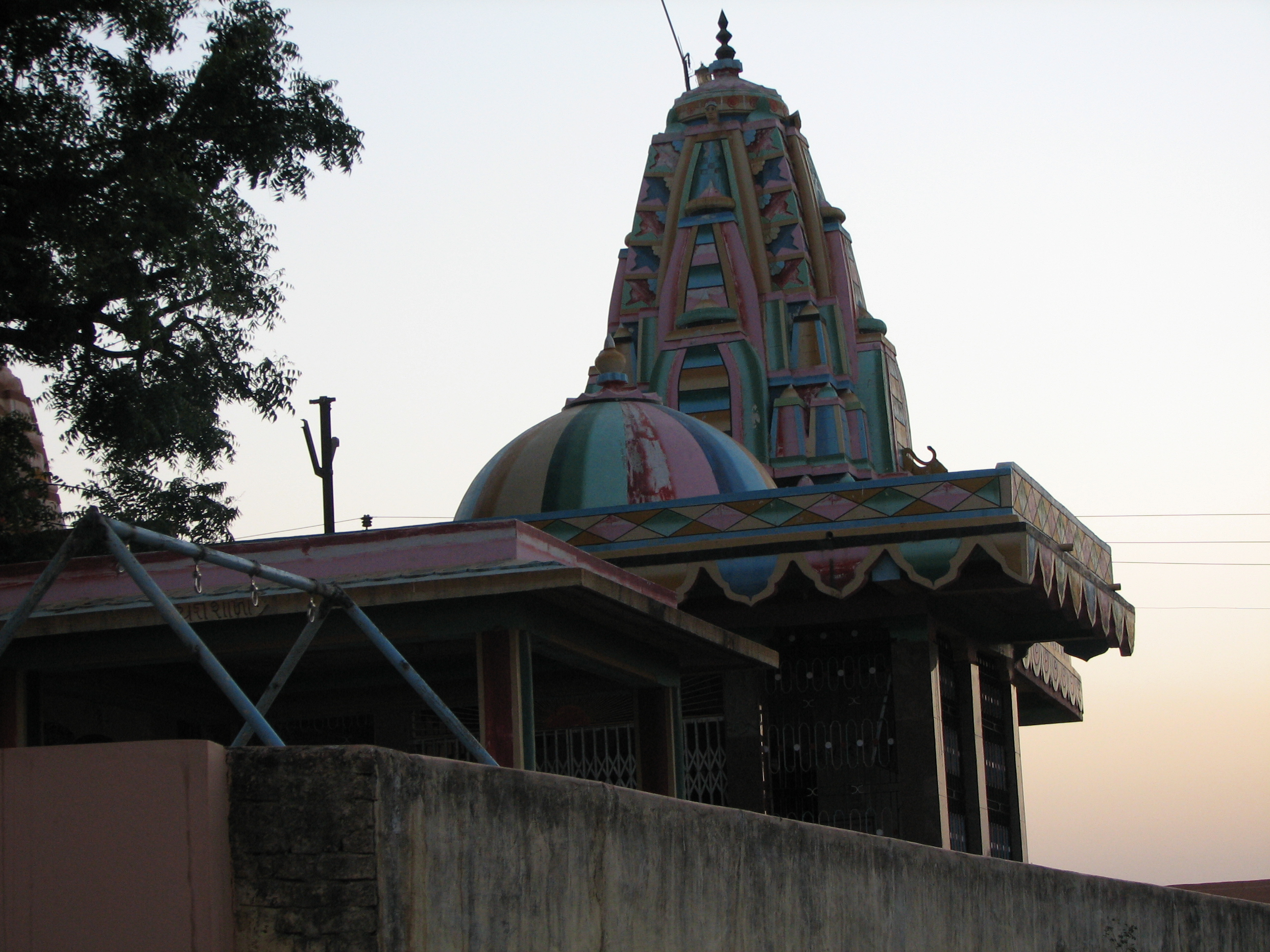
Goddess Kuldevi Chamunda-devi Temple

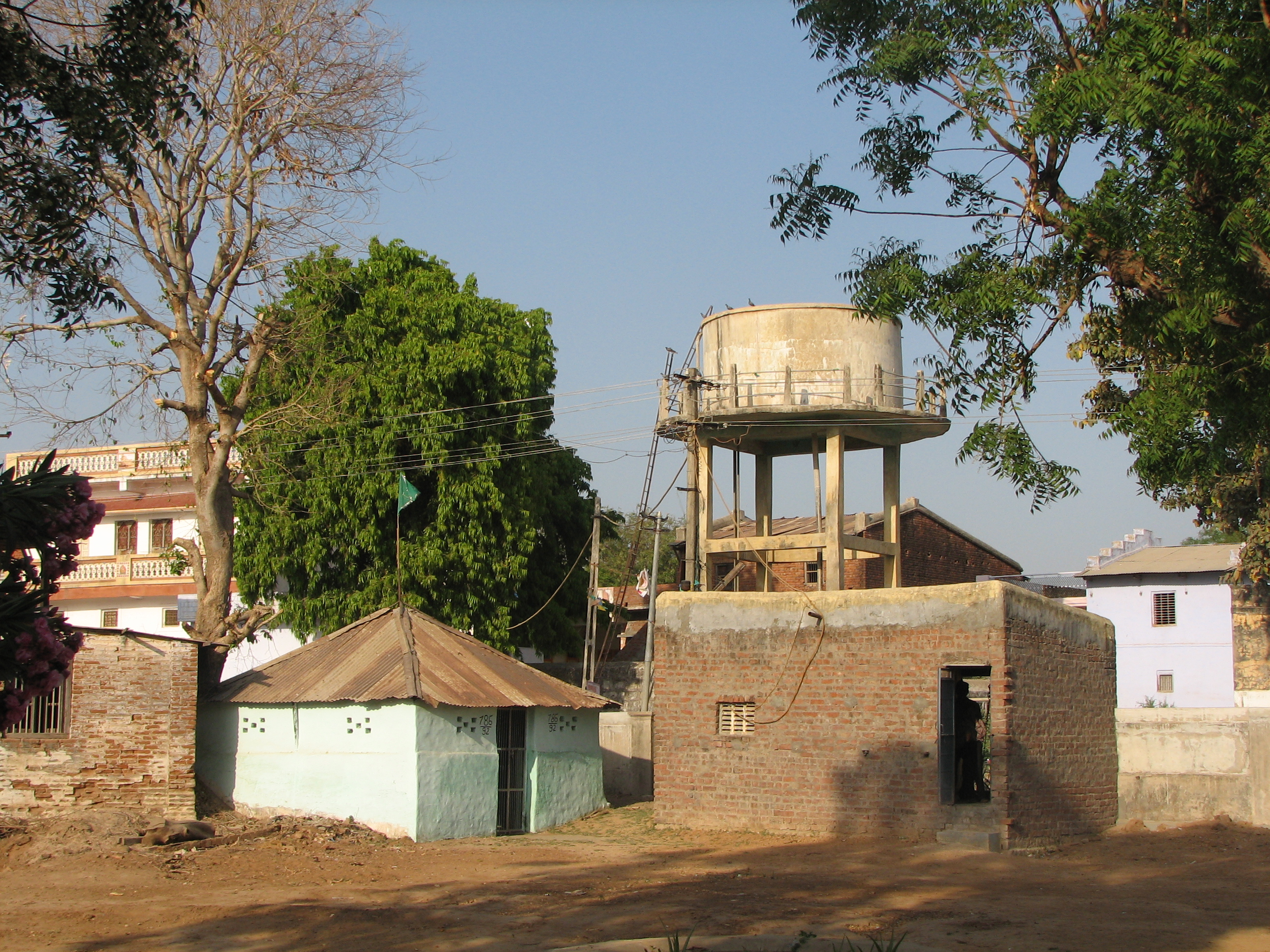
Village view

Varsoda (or Varsora) was a Hindu princely state in Mahi Kantha with an area of 28 square kilometers km^{2} (11 square miles) before Indian Independence (1947). It had a population of 4,051 in 1892, 3,656 in 1901, yielding 18,871 rupees sate revenue (1903-4, mainly from land), and paying 1,583 rupees tribute to the Gaekwar Baroda State.

Varsoda is also well known for jain derasar which has completed its glorious hundred years on 5th may 2023 and declared as tirth of lord 12th tirthankar Shree Vasupujaya Swamiji.

== Rulers ==
- Thakore Gambhirsinhji
- Thakore Motisinhji -/1858
- Thakore Kishorsinhji Motisinhji, born 15 October 1840, succeeded 4 March 1858, died 18 July 1919
- Thakur Joravarsinhji, born 17 April 1914 and succeeded 18 July 1919. The state ceased to exist on 10 June 1948 by accession to Bombay State.

== External links and sources ==
- Imperial Gazetteer, o DSAL - Mahi Kantha
