= Lakhtar State =

Princely state of the British Raj

Coordinates: 22.8500°N 71.8333°E

State of Lakhtar Than-Lakhtar
- 1604–1948
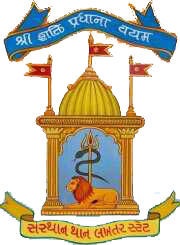
- Coat of arms
- History
  - Established: 1604
  - Disestablished: 1948

Area
  - Total: 640 km^{2} (250 sq mi)
Preceded by	Succeeded by
Kingdom of Jhalavad	1943: Dhrangadhra State; 1947: India
- Today part of: Gujarat, India

During the British Raj period, Lakhtar State, in the present-day Indian state of Gujarat, was a non-salute princely state and was governed by members of a Jhala rajput dynasty.

Lakhtar state was founded in 1604. The rulers ruled with the title of Thakur Sahib.

== Ruler ==
1. Thakur Abhaisinhji Chandrasinhji 1604 – 1639
2. Thakur Vajirajji I Abhaisinhji 1639 – 1665
3. Thakur Sahib Sheshmalji Vajerajji 1665 – 1696
4. Thakur Sahib Gopalsinhji Sheshmalji 1696 – 1714
5. Thakur Sahib Karansinhji I Gopalsinhji 1714 – 1741
6. Thakur Sahib Abherajji Karansinhji 1741 – 1769
7. Thakur Sahib Raydhanji Abherajji 1769 – 1798
8. Thakur Sahib Sangramji Raydhanji 1798 (Abdicated)
9. Thakur Sahib Chandrasinhji Raydhanji (Brother) 1798 – 1803
10. Thakur Sahib Prithirajji Chandrasinhji 1803 – 1835
11. Thakur Sahib Vajirajji II Prithirajji 1835 – 12 June 1846
12. 12 June 1846 – 8 August 1924 Karansinhji II Vajirajji (1846 – 1924)
13. 8 August 1924 – 2 July 1940 Balvirsinhji Karansinhji (1881 – 1940)
14. 2 July 1940 – 15 Aug 1947 Indrasinhji Balvirsinhji (1907 – 1970)
15. 1970 – Present Balbhadrasinhji Indrasinhji
