= Bagor, Rajasthan =

Bagor Mewar Mesolithic Site
- Town
- Location in Rajasthan, India
- Coordinates: 25.3575086°N 74.3731085°E
- Country: India
- State: Rajasthan
- District: Bhilwara
- Tehsil: Mandal
- Sub-Tehsil: Bagor

Area
  - Total: 3,065.73 ha (7,575.58 acres)

Population
  - Total: 9,500
  - Density: 310/km^{2} (800/sq mi)

Languages
  - Spoken: Mewari
  - Official Language: Hindi
- Time zone: UTC+5:30 (IST)
- PIN: 311402
- Telephone code: 01486
- ISO 3166 code: RJ-IN
- Vehicle registration: RJ 06

Bagor is a town with Sub-Tehsil in Mandal tehsil of Bhilwara district of Rajasthan State, India.

== Prehistoric Housing Site ==
Bagor (Rajasthan) on the left bank of river Kothari is the largest Mesolithic site in India and has been horizontally excavated. Bagor has three cultural phases. On the basis; of radiocarbon dating phase I or the earliest phase of culture has been placed between 5000 and 2500 B.P (uncalibrated radiocarbon dates). Here Mesolithic five human skeletons which were buried in a planned manner. The earliest evidence of domestication of animals and fire found here. The site reportedly has the earliest record of domesticated horses in India.

== History ==
Sajjan Singh (18 July 1859 – 23 December 1884), was the Maharana of princely state of Udaipur (r. 1874 – 1884). He was a son of Shakti Singh form the Bagor branch of Mewar and was adopted by Maharana Shambhu Singh.

== Tourist places ==
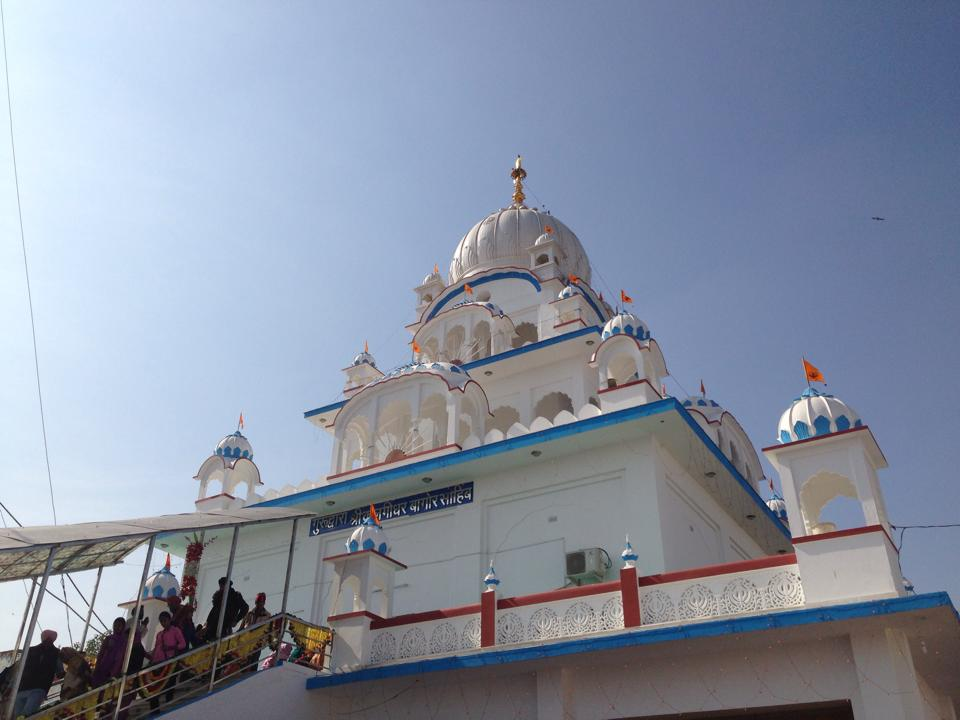

Gurudwara Shri Kalgidhar Bagor Sahib - Bagor is Sh. Guru Gobind Singh Ji stayed here when he was on journey to Punjab. This historical Gurdwara is situated at a distance of 20 km from town Mandal in town Bagor of Tehsil Mandal, District Bhilwara, Rajasthan. This holy place has been blessed by the visit of the Tenth Sikh Guru, Guru Gobind Singh Ji.

== Demographics ==
According to 2011 census Average Sex Ratio of Bagor village is 991 which is higher than Rajasthan state average of 928. Child Sex Ratio for the Bagor as per census is 894, higher than Rajasthan average of 888.

Bagor village has lower literacy rate compared to Rajasthan. In 2011, literacy rate of Bagor village was 62.69% compared to 66.11% of Rajasthan. In Bagor Male literacy stands at 78.56% while female literacy rate was 46.94%.

As per constitution of India and Panchyati Raaj Act, Bagor village is administrated by Sarpanch (Head of Village) who is elected representative of village.

== Infrastructure ==
=== Roads connectivity ===
Bagor is situated 27 km away from sub-district headquarter Mandal and 31 km away from district headquarter Bhilwara and 125 km away from Udaipur.

=== Communication facilities ===
- Bagor post office

=== Education ===
- Government Senior Secondary School Bagor
- Swami Vivekanand Govt. Model School Bagor
- Prem Devi Bed government senior secondary girls school Bagor
- Ward no. 5 government primary school
- Shishu Gyan Mandir Senior Secondary School, Bagore

== Book ==
- Bagor - A Late Mesolithic Settlement in North-West India
